= 1988 Cleveland Browns season =

NFL team season

- Owner: Art Modell
- General manager: Ernie Accorsi
- Head coach: Marty Schottenheimer
- Defensive coordinator: Dave Adolph
- Home stadium: Cleveland Municipal Stadium

Results
- Record: 10–6
- Division place: 2nd AFC Central
- Playoffs: Lost Wild Card Playoffs (vs. Oilers) 23–24
- Pro Bowlers: OLB Clay Matthews Jr. CB Hanford Dixon; CB Frank Minnifield

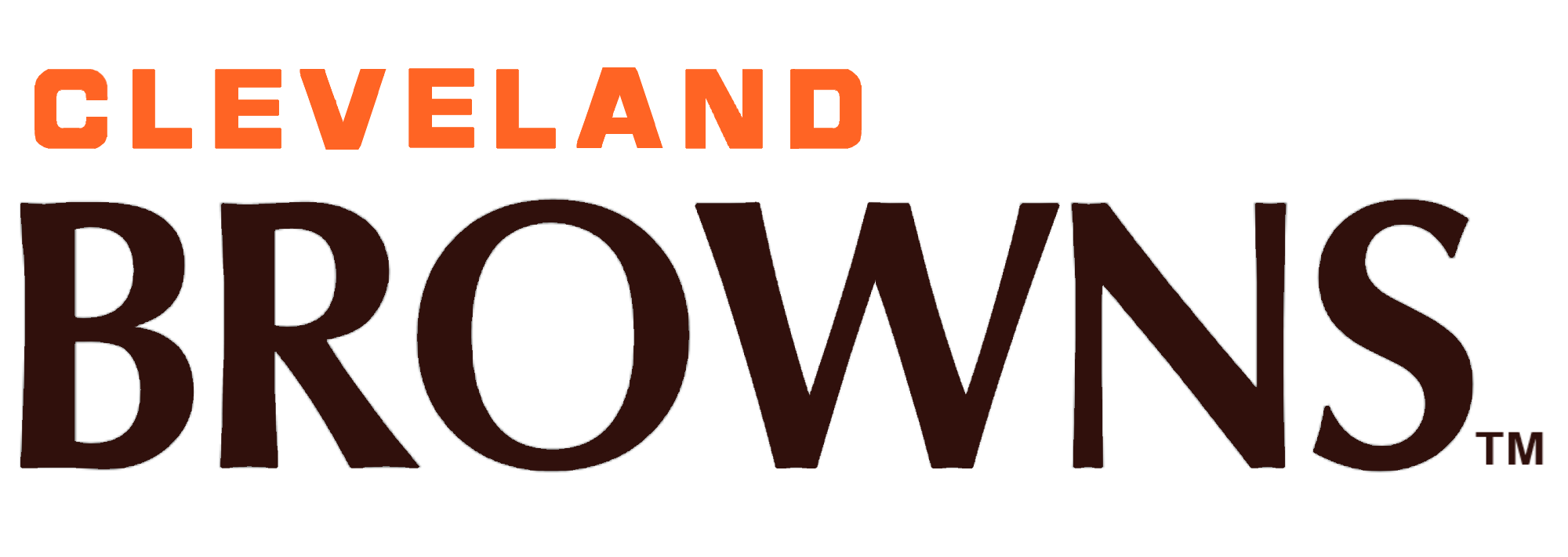
Primary script logo used by the Cleveland Browns, 1975-1995

The 1988 Cleveland Browns season was the team's 39th season with the National Football League.

Despite taking the Browns to the playoffs for the fourth consecutive year, head coach Marty Schottenheimer resigned at the end of the 1988 season. He left the Browns having compiled a record of 44–27 (a 62% winning percentage) with the team. (Schottenheimer would later go through a similar scenario with the San Diego Chargers: they fired him after the 2006 season, during which the Chargers posted a 14–2 record and then lost their first playoff game.) The Browns finished the season with a 10–6 record, tied for second place in the AFC Central with the Houston Oilers. The Browns were awarded second place by posting a better division record than the Oilers. The Browns clinched a playoff berth for the 4th straight season. In the playoffs, they lost to the Oilers in the Wild Card game, 24–23. As of 2023, this remains the last time the Browns swept the Steelers.

== Offseason ==
=== NFL draft ===
1988 Cleveland Browns draft
Round	Pick	Player	Position	College	Notes
1	21	Clifford Charlton	OLB	Florida	
2	50	Michael Dean Perry *	DT	Clemson	
3	77	Van Waiters	OLB	Indiana	
4	103	Anthony Blaylock	CB	Winston-Salem State	
7	188	Thane Gash	S	East Tennessee State	
8	216	J.J. Birden	WR	Oregon	
9	244	Danny Copeland	DB	Eastern Kentucky	
10	272	Brian Washington	DB	Nebraska	
11	300	Hendley Hawkins	WR	Nebraska	
12	328	Steve Slayden	QB	Duke	
Made roster † Pro Football Hall of Fame * Made at least one Pro Bowl during career

== Personnel ==
=== Staff ===
1988 Cleveland Browns staff
Front office: President and owner – Art Modell; Executive vice-president of football operations – Ernie Accorsi; Head coaches: Head coach – Marty Schottenheimer; Offensive coaches: Quarterbacks – Marc Trestman; Running backs – Joe Pendry; Receivers – Richard Mann; Tight ends – Ray Braun; Offensive line – Howard Mudd	Defensive coaches: Defensive coordinator – Dave Adolph; Defensive line – Tom Pratt; Secondary – Bill Cowher; Special assistant/defense – Darvin Wallis; Special teams coaches: Special teams – Kurt Schottenheimer; Strength and conditioning: Strength and conditioning – Dave Redding

=== Roster ===
1988 Cleveland Browns roster
Quarterbacks (QB): 19 Bernie Kosar; 10 Mike Pagel; 12 Don Strock; Running backs (RB): 43 Tony Baker; 44 Earnest Byner; 28 Herman Fontenot KR; 34 Kevin Mack; 42 Tim Manoa FB; Wide receivers (WR): 86 Brian Brennan; 88 Reggie Langhorne; 89 Gerald McNeil PR; 84 Webster Slaughter; 85 Clarence Weathers; 83 Glen Young KR; Tight ends (TE): 82 Ozzie Newsome; 81 Derek Tennell	Offensive linemen (OL): 77 Rickey Bolden T; 74 Paul Farren T; 69 Dan Fike G; 66 Tony Jones G/T; 73 Gregg Rakoczy C; 63 Cody Risien T; 70 Larry Williams G; 64 Frank Winters; Defensive linemen (DL): 91 Sam Clancy DE; 79 Bob Golic DT; 78 Carl Hairston DE; 95 Marlon Jones DE; 92 Michael Dean Perry DT; 99 Darryl Sims DE	Linebackers (LB): 58 Clifford Charlton OLB; 56 David Grayson OLB; 51 Eddie Johnson ILB; 59 Mike Johnson ILB; 54 Mike Junkin ILB; 57 Clay Matthews OLB; 50 Van Waiters OLB; Defensive backs (DB): 36 Stephen Braggs CB; 29 Hanford Dixon CB; 30 Thane Gash SS; 23 Mark Harper CB; 35 Will Hill SS; 31 Frank Minnifield CB; 48 Brian Washington SS; 22 Felix Wright FS; Special teams (ST): 9 Matt Bahr K; 4 Max Runager P	Reserve: 87 JJ Birden WR (PUP); 24 Anthony Blaylock CB (IR); 72 Charles Buchanan DE (IR); 39 Danny Copeland S (IR); 18 Gary Danielson QB (IR); 8 Jeff Jaeger K (IR); -- Jeff Modesitt TE (IR); 75 Chris Pike DT (IR); 38 George Swarn RB (IR); 47 active, 9 inactive Rookies in italics

== Regular season ==
=== Schedule ===
Week	Date	Opponent	Result	Record	Venue	Attendance	Recap
1	September 4	at Kansas City Chiefs	**W** 6–3	1–0	Arrowhead Stadium	55,654	Recap
2	September 11	New York Jets	**L** 3–23	1–1	Cleveland Municipal Stadium	74,434	Recap
3	September 19	Indianapolis Colts	**W** 23–17	2–1	Cleveland Municipal Stadium	75,148	Recap
4	September 25	at **Cincinnati Bengals**	**L** 17–24	2–2	Riverfront Stadium	54,943	Recap
5	October 2	at **Pittsburgh Steelers**	**W** 23–9	3–2	Three Rivers Stadium	56,410	Recap
6	October 9	Seattle Seahawks	**L** 10–16	3–3	Cleveland Municipal Stadium	78,605	Recap
7	October 16	Philadelphia Eagles	**W** 19–3	4–3	Cleveland Municipal Stadium	78,787	Recap
8	October 23	at Phoenix Cardinals	**W** 29–21	5–3	Sun Devil Stadium	61,261	Recap
9	October 30	**Cincinnati Bengals**	**W** 23–16	6–3	Cleveland Municipal Stadium	79,147	Recap
10	November 7	at **Houston Oilers**	**L** 17–24	6–4	Houston Astrodome	51,467	Recap
11	November 13	at Denver Broncos	**L** 7–30	6–5	Mile High Stadium	75,806	Recap
12	November 20	**Pittsburgh Steelers**	**W** 27–7	7–5	Cleveland Municipal Stadium	77,131	Recap
13	November 27	at Washington Redskins	**W** 17–13	8–5	RFK Stadium	51,604	Recap
14	December 4	Dallas Cowboys	**W** 24–21	9–5	Cleveland Municipal Stadium	77,683	Recap
15	December 12	at Miami Dolphins	**L** 31–38	9–6	Joe Robbie Stadium	61,884	Recap
16	December 18	**Houston Oilers**	**W** 28–23	10–6	Cleveland Municipal Stadium	74,610	Recap
Note: Intra-division opponents are in **bold** text.

== Postseason ==
Round	Date	Opponent (seed)	Result	Record	Venue	Recap
Wild Card	December 24	Houston Oilers (5)	L 23–24	0–1	Cleveland Municipal Stadium	Recap

== Game summaries ==
=== Week 1 ===
Team	1	2	3	4	Total
• Browns	0	3	0	3	6
Chiefs	0	3	0	0	3

- Date: September 4
- Location: Arrowhead Stadium
- Game start: 4:00 p.m. EST
- Game attendance: 55,654
- Game weather: 65 °F or 18.3 °C; wind 13 miles per hour (21 km/h; 11 kn)
- Referee: Jim Tunney
- Television network: NBC

Scoring summary
Q2	KC	Lowery 33-yard field goal	KC 3–0
Q2	CLE	Bahr 19-yard field goal	Tie 3–3
Q4	CLE	Bahr 38-yard field goal	CLE 6–3

=== Week 9 ===
Team	1	2	3	4	Total
Bengals	0	10	3	3	16
• Browns	3	7	10	3	23

- Date: October 30
- Location: Cleveland Municipal Stadium
- Game start: 1:00 p.m. EST
- Game weather: 38 °F or 3.3 °C; wind 9 miles per hour (14 km/h; 7.8 kn)
- Referee: Dick Jorgensen
- TV announcers (NBC): Dick Enberg and Merlin Olsen

Scoring summary
Q1	CLE	Bahr 34-yard field goal	CLE 3–0
Q2	CIN	Fulcher 16-yard interception return (Breech kick)	CIN 7–3
Q2	CLE	Manoa 2-yard run (Bahr kick)	CLE 10–7
Q2	CIN	Breech 19-yard field goal	Tie 10–10
Q3	CLE	Bahr 39-yard field goal	CLE 13–10
Q3	CLE	Fontenot 1 yard blocked punt return (Bahr kick)	CLE 20–10
Q3	CIN	Breech 32-yard field goal	CLE 20–13
Q4	CLE	Bahr 29-yard field goal	CLE 23–13
Q4	CIN	Breech 22-yard field goal	CLE 23–16

=== Week 14 ===
Team	1	2	3	4	Total
Cowboys	0	14	0	7	21
• Browns	7	3	0	14	24

- Date: December 4
- Location: Cleveland Municipal Stadium
- Game start: 1:00 p.m. EST
- Game attendance: 77,683
- Game weather: 35 °F or 1.7 °C; wind 16 miles per hour (26 km/h; 14 kn)
- Referee: Jerry Seeman
- TV announcers (CBS): Jim Nantz and Kenny Stabler

Scoring summary
Q1	CLE	Langhorne 73-yard pass from Kosar (Bahr kick)	CLE 7–0
Q2	DAL	Clack 7-yard pass from Pelluer (Ruzek kick)	Tie 7–7
Q2	CLE	Bahr 25-yard field goal	CLE 10–7
Q2	DAL	Folsom 5-yard pass from Peuller (Ruzek kick)	DAL 14–10
Q4	CLE	Fontenot 14-yard pass from Kosar (Bahr kick)	CLE 17–14
Q4	CLE	Weathers 36-yard pass from Kosar (Bahr kick)	CLE 24–14
Q4	DAL	Walker 4-yard run (Ruzek kick)	CLE 24–21

=== Week 16 ===
Team	1	2	3	4	Total
Oilers	10	6	7	0	23
• Browns	0	7	7	14	28

- Date: December 18
- Location: Cleveland Municipal Stadium, Cleveland, Ohio
- Game start: 1:00 p.m.
- Game attendance: 74,610
- Game weather: Snow; 20 °F or −6.7 °C; wind 13 miles per hour (21 km/h; 11 kn)
- Referee: Dick Jorgensen
- TV announcers (NBC): Don Criqui and Bob Trumpy

Scoring summary
Q1	HOU	Tony Zendejas 39-yard field goal	HOU 3–0
Q1	HOU	Domingo Bryant 36-yard interception return (Tony Zendejas kick)	HOU 10–0
Q2	CLE	Michael Dean Perry 10-yard fumble return (Matt Bahr kick)	HOU 10–7
Q2	HOU	Tony Zendejas 42-yard field goal	HOU 13–7
Q2	HOU	Tony Zendejas 35-yard field goal	HOU 16–7
Q3	HOU	Haywood Jeffires 7-yard pass from Warren Moon (Tony Zendejas kick)	HOU 23–7
Q3	CLE	Earnest Byner 2-yard pass from Don Strock (Matt Bahr kick)	HOU 23–14
Q4	CLE	Earnest Byner 2-yard run (Matt Bahr kick)	HOU 23–21
Q4	CLE	Webster Slaughter 22-yard pass from Don Strock (Matt Bahr kick)	CLE 28–23

== Standings ==
AFC Central
	W	L	T	PCT	DIV	CONF	PF	PA	STK
^{(1)} Cincinnati Bengals	12	4	0	.750	4–2	8–4	448	329	W1
^{(4)} Cleveland Browns	10	6	0	.625	4–2	6–6	304	288	W1
^{(5)} Houston Oilers	10	6	0	.625	3–3	7–5	424	365	L1
Pittsburgh Steelers	5	11	0	.313	1–5	4–8	336	421	W1

== Playoffs ==
=== AFC wild card game ===
Houston Oilers 24, Cleveland Browns 23

Quarter	1	2	3	4	Total
Oilers	0	14	0	10	24
Browns	3	6	7	7	23

at Cleveland Stadium, Cleveland, Ohio

- Game time: 1:30 p.m. EST
- Game attendance: 74,977
- Referee: Jerry Seeman
- TV announcers (NBC): Don Criqui and Bob Trumpy

Oilers cornerback Richard Johnson's interception set up kicker Tony Zendejas' game-clinching 49-yard field goal with 1:54 left in the game. After the Browns scored first on a 33-yard field goal by Matt Bahr, Houston marched 91 yards to score on quarterback Warren Moon's 14-yard touchdown pass to running back Allen Pinkett. Then on Cleveland's next drive, Oilers defensive lineman Richard Byrd recovered quarterback Don Strock's fumble to set up Pinkett's 16-yard touchdown run. Bahr later made two field goals to cut Houston's lead, 14–9, before halftime. In the third quarter, backup quarterback Mike Pagel, who replaced an injured Strock, threw a 14-yard touchdown completion to wide receiver Webster Slaughter to put the Browns ahead, 16–14. However, the Oilers marched on a 76-yard drive that was capped with running back Lorenzo White's 1-yard rushing touchdown. After Johnson's interception and Zendejas' subsequent game-clinching 49-yard field goal, Slaughter caught a 2-yard touchdown reception to close out the scoring.
