= 1990 Cleveland Browns season =

45th season in franchise history

- Owner: Art Modell
- Head coach: Bud Carson (fired on November 5, 2-7 record); Jim Shofner (interim; 1-6 record)
- Offensive coordinator: Jim Shofner
- Defensive coordinator: Jim Vechiarella
- Home stadium: Cleveland Municipal Stadium

Results
- Record: 3–13
- Division place: 4th AFC Central
- Playoffs: Did not qualify
- Pro Bowlers: DT Michael Dean Perry; LB Mike Johnson

The 1990 Cleveland Browns season was the team's 41st season with the National Football League.

The season was the second for head coach Bud Carson, but the Browns started the season 2–7. They failed to approach their 9–6–1 record from 1989, finishing 3–13 and missing the playoffs for the first time since 1984. Carson was fired one day after a Week Nine shutout loss to the eventual AFC Champion Buffalo Bills. He was replaced by former Browns quarterback Jim Shofner, who finished the season with only one additional win.

The 1990 Browns surrendered 462 points, the largest number scored against any NFL team during the 1990s. Their -234 point differential is the third-worst figure for any 1990s NFL season and even worse than the 1999 Browns expansion team. After the season, Al Baker retired.

== Offseason ==
=== NFL draft ===
1990 Cleveland Browns draft
Round	Pick	Player	Position	College	Notes
2	45	Leroy Hoard *	Running back	Michigan	
3	73	Anthony Pleasant	Defensive end	Tennessee State	
4	101	Harlon Barnett	Safety	Michigan State	
5	129	Rob Burnett *	Defensive end	Syracuse	
6	157	Randy Hilliard	Cornerback	Northwestern State	
7	178	Scott Galbraith	Tight end	Southern California	
8	212	Jock Jones	Linebacker	Virginia Tech	
9	240	Eugene Rowell	Wide receiver	Southern Miss	
10	268	Michael Wallace	Defensive back	Jackson State	
11	296	Clemente Gordon	Quarterback	Grambling State	
12	323	Kerry Simien	Wide receiver	Texas A&M–Kingsville	
Made roster * Made at least one Pro Bowl during career

== Personnel ==
1990 Cleveland Browns staff
Front office: Owner and president – Art Modell; Executive vice-president of football operations – Ernie Accorsi; Director of pro personnel – Michael Lombardi; Head coaches: Head coach – Bud Carson; Assistant head coach/Offensive Line – Dan Radakovich; Offensive coaches: Offensive coordinator – Jim Shofner; Quarterbacks – Zeke Bratkowski; Run coordinator/running backs – George Sefcik; Receivers – Richard Mann; Pass coordinator/tight ends – Lionel Taylor	Defensive coaches: Defensive coordinator/linebackers – Jim Vechiarella; Defensive line – John Teerlinck; Secondary – Mike Faulkiner; Special teams coaches: Special Teams Coordinator – Paul Lanham; Strength and conditioning: Strength and conditioning – Stan Jones

== Roster ==
1990 Cleveland Browns roster
Quarterbacks (QB): 13 Jeff Francis; 19 Bernie Kosar; 10 Mike Pagel; Running backs (RB): 27 Derrick Gainer; 33 Leroy Hoard; 34 Kevin Mack FB; 21 Eric Metcalf KR; Wide receivers (WR): 86 Brian Brennan PR; 80 Vernon Joines; 88 Reggie Langhorne; 83 Eugene Rowell; 84 Webster Slaughter; Tight ends (TE): 81 Scott Galbraith; 82 Ozzie Newsome; 87 John Talley	Offensive linemen (OL): 61 Mike Baab C; 74 Paul Farren T; 69 Dan Fike G; 66 Tony Jones T; 73 Gregg Rakoczy G; 77 Ken Reeves T; 65 Ralph Tamm G; Defensive linemen (DL): 97 Robert Banks DE; 94 Bob Buczkowski DE; 90 Rob Burnett DE; 71 Tom Gibson DT; 92 Michael Dean Perry DT; 98 Anthony Pleasant DE	Linebackers (LB): 58 Marcus Cotton OLB; 56 David Grayson OLB; 51 Eddie Johnson MLB; 59 Mike Johnson MLB; 55 Jock Jones; 57 Clay Matthews OLB; 50 Van Waiters OLB; Defensive backs (DB): 37 Harlon Barnett FS; 24 Anthony Blaylock CB; 36 Stephen Braggs CB; 26 Raymond Clayborn CB; 30 Thane Gash FS; 23 Mark Harper CB; 39 Randy Hilliard CB; 31 Frank Minnifield CB; 22 Felix Wright SS; Special teams (ST): 2 Jerry Kauric K; 67 Mike Morris LS; 15 Bryan Wagner P	Practice squad: -- Shawn Bouwens G; 28 Tyrone Shavers WR; Reserve: 60 Al Baker DE; 68 Ted Banker G (IR); 12 Jeff Graham QB (IR); 62 Ben Jefferson G (IR); 95 Marlon Jones DE (IR); 40 Kyle Kramer S (IR); 42 Tim Manoa FB (IR); 89 Mike Oliphant RB (IR); 75 Chris Pike DT (IR); 72 Kevin Robbins T (IR); 85 Lawyer Tillman TE (IR); 91 Rhondy Weston DE (IR); Rookies in italics 47 active, 12 reserve, 2 practice squad

== Schedule ==
Week	Date	Opponent	Result	Record	Venue	Attendance
1	September 9	**Pittsburgh Steelers**	**W** 13–3	1–0	Cleveland Municipal Stadium	78,298
2	September 16	at New York Jets	**L** 21–24	1–1	Giants Stadium	67,354
3	September 23	San Diego Chargers	**L** 14–24	1–2	Cleveland Municipal Stadium	77,429
4	September 30	at Kansas City Chiefs	**L** 0–34	1–3	Arrowhead Stadium	75,462
5	October 8	at Denver Broncos	**W** 30–29	2–3	Mile High Stadium	74,814
6	October 14	at New Orleans Saints	**L** 20–25	2–4	Louisiana Superdome	68,608
7	October 22	**Cincinnati Bengals**	**L** 13–34	2–5	Cleveland Municipal Stadium	78,567
8	October 28	at San Francisco 49ers	**L** 17–20	2–6	Candlestick Park	63,672
9	November 4	Buffalo Bills	**L** 0–42	2–7	Cleveland Municipal Stadium	78,331
10	Bye					
11	November 18	**Houston Oilers**	**L** 23–35	2–8	Cleveland Municipal Stadium	76,726
12	November 25	Miami Dolphins	**L** 13–30	2–9	Cleveland Municipal Stadium	70,225
13	December 2	Los Angeles Rams	**L** 23–38	2–10	Cleveland Municipal Stadium	61,981
14	December 9	at **Houston Oilers**	**L** 14–58	2–11	Houston Astrodome	54,469
15	December 16	Atlanta Falcons	**W** 13–10	3–11	Cleveland Municipal Stadium	46,536
16	December 23	at **Pittsburgh Steelers**	**L** 0–35	3–12	Three Rivers Stadium	51,665
17	December 30	at **Cincinnati Bengals**	**L** 14–21	3–13	Riverfront Stadium	60,041
Note: Intra-division opponents are in **bold** text.

=== Standings ===
AFC Central
	W	L	T	PCT	DIV	CONF	PF	PA	STK
^{(3)} Cincinnati Bengals	9	7	0	.563	5–1	8–4	360	352	W2
^{(6)} Houston Oilers	9	7	0	.563	4–2	8–4	405	307	W1
Pittsburgh Steelers	9	7	0	.563	2–4	6–6	292	240	L1
Cleveland Browns	3	13	0	.188	1–5	2–10	228	462	L2

== Game summaries ==
=== Week 15: vs. Atlanta ===
Week 15: Atlanta Falcons at Cleveland Browns – Game summary

Quarter	1	2	3	4	Total
Falcons	0	3	0	7	10
Browns	0	10	3	0	13

at Cleveland Municipal Stadium, Cleveland, Ohio

- Date: December 16
- Game time: 1:00 p.m. EST
- Game weather: 39 °F (4 °C), relative humidity 79%, round (wind) 15 mph (24 km/h), wind chill 30 °F (−1 °C)
- Game attendance: 46,536
- Referee: Dick Hantak
- TV announcers (CBS): Brad Nessler (play–by–play) and Dan Jiggetts (color commentator)

Game information

First quarter

- No scoring plays

Second quarter

- ATL (6:50) – Davis 30 yard field goal
  Falcons 3, Browns 0
- CLE (13:04) – Mack 5 yard rush (Kauric kick)
  Browns 7, Falcons 3
- CLE (14:58) – Kauric 23 yard field goal
  Browns 10, Falcons 3

Third quarter

- CLE (7:02) – Kauric 41 yard field goal
  Browns 13, Falcons 3

Fourth quarter

- ATL (15:00) – Dixon 11 yard pass from Millen (Davis kick)
  Browns 13, Falcons 10

Top passers

- ATL – Hugh Millen 11/27, 168 yds, 1 TD
- CLE – Bernie Kosar 22/37, 217 yds, 1 INT

Top rushers

- ATL – Mike Rozier 11 carr, 31 yds
- CLE – Kevin Mack 13 carr, 80 yds, 1 TD

Top receivers

- ATL – Andre Rison 6 rec, 100 yds
- CLE – Reggie Langhorne 5 rec, 70 yds

Turnovers

- ATL – 0
- CLE – 2

=== Week 17 at Bengals ===
Week 17: Cleveland Browns (3–12) at Cincinnati Bengals (8–7)

Quarter	1	2	3	4	Total
Browns	0	0	14	0	14
Bengals	0	14	0	7	21

at Riverfront Stadium, Cincinnati, Ohio

- Date: December 30
- Game time: 1:00 p.m. EST
- Game weather: 52 °F (11 °C)
- Game attendance: 60,041
- Referee: Gene Barth
- Pro-Football-Reference.com, The Football Database

Game information

First quarter No scoring Second quarter

- CIN – James Francis 17-yard interception return (Jim Breech kick), 7:10. Bengals 7–0.
- CIN – Rodney Holman 22-yard pass from Boomer Esiason (Jim Breech kick), 2:14. Bengals 14–0. Drive:

Third quarter

- CLE – Kevin Mack 2-yard run (Jerry Kauric kick), 13:36. Bengals 14–7. Drive:
- CLE – Brian Brennan 16-yard pass from Mike Pagel (Jerry Kauric kick), 10:28. Tie 14–14. Drive:

Fourth quarter

- CIN – Eric Ball 48-yard pass from Boomer Esiason (Jim Breech kick), 8:40. Bengals 21–14. Drive:

Top passers

- CLE – Mike Pagel – 14/32, 184 yards, TD, 3 INT
- CIN – Boomer Esiason – 10/16, 154 yards, 2 TD, 2 INT

Top rushers

- CLE – Kevin Mack – 16 rushes, 85 yards, TD
- CIN – James Brooks – 17 rushes, 84 yards

Top receivers

- CLE – Webster Slaughter – 6 receptions, 115 yards
- CIN – Eric Ball – 1 reception, 48 yards, TD
