= Marty Schottenheimer =

American football player and coach (1943–2021)

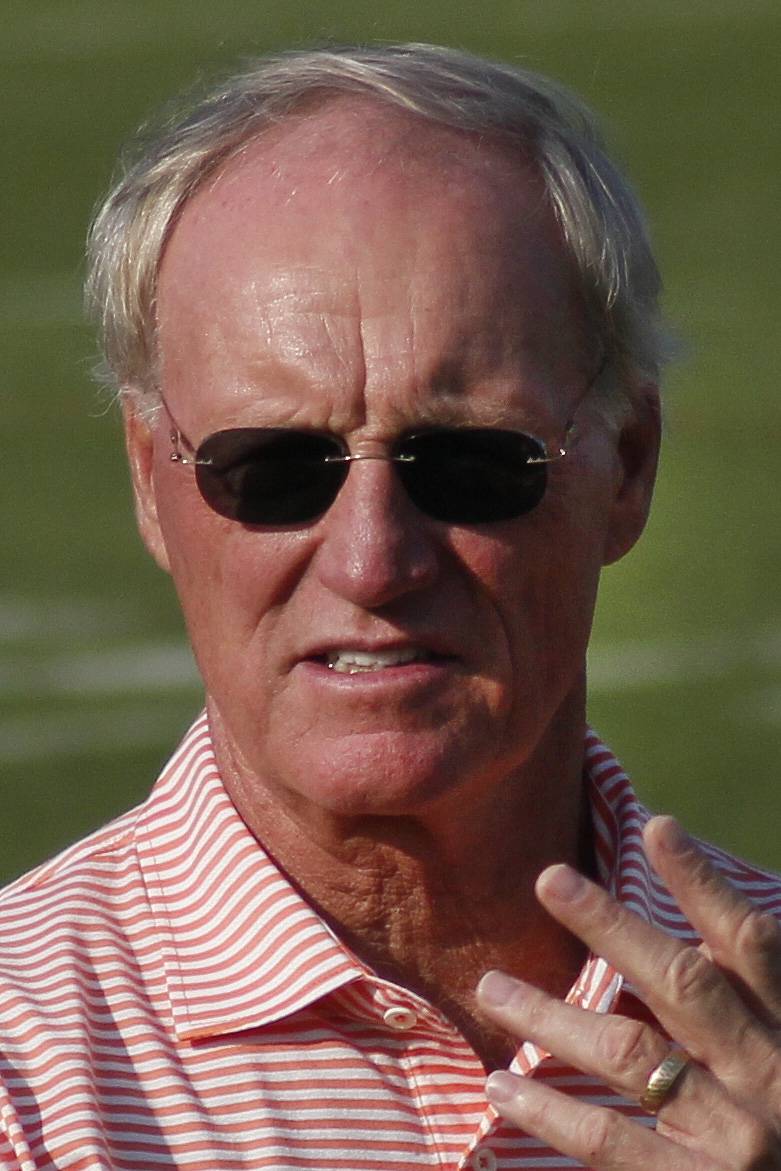
- Schottenheimer in 2013

No. 56, 57, 54
- Position: Linebacker

Personal information
- Born: September 23, 1943; Canonsburg, Pennsylvania, U.S.
- Died: February 8, 2021 (aged 77); Charlotte, North Carolina, U.S.
- Listed height: 6 ft 3 in (1.91 m)
- Listed weight: 225 lb (102 kg)

Career information
- High school: Fort Cherry (McDonald, Pennsylvania)
- College: Pittsburgh (1961–1964)
- NFL draft: 1965: 4th round, 49th overall pick
- AFL draft: 1965: 7th round, 56th overall pick

Career history

Playing
- Buffalo Bills (1965–1968); Boston Patriots (1969–1970); Pittsburgh Steelers (1971)*; Baltimore Colts (1971)*
- * Offseason or practice squad member only

Coaching
- Portland Storm (1974) Linebackers coach; New York Giants (1975–1976) Linebackers coach; New York Giants (1977) Defensive coordinator; Detroit Lions (1978–1979) Linebackers coach; Cleveland Browns (1980–1984) Defensive coordinator; Cleveland Browns (1984–1988) Head coach; Kansas City Chiefs (1989–1998) Head coach; Washington Redskins (2001) Head coach; San Diego Chargers (2002–2006) Head coach; Virginia Destroyers (2011) Head coach and general manager

Awards and highlights
- As player: AFL champion (1965); AFL All-Star (1965); Second-team All-American (1964); First-team All-East (1964); As coach: UFL championship (2011); UFL Coach of the Year (2011); AP NFL Coach of the Year (2004); 2× 101 Awards AFC Coach of the Year (1986, 2004); Greasy Neale Award (2004); 2× UPI AFC Coach of the Year (1986, 1995); Kansas City Chiefs Hall of Honor

Career NFL/AFL statistics
- Interceptions: 6
- Touchdowns: 1
- Fumble recoveries: 1
- Stats at Pro Football Reference

Head coaching record
- Regular season: NFL: 200–126–1 (.613); UFL: 3–1 (.750)
- Postseason: NFL: 5–13 (.278); UFL: 1–0 (1.000)
- Career: NFL: 205–139–1 (.596); UFL: 4–1 (.800)
- Coaching profile at Pro Football Reference
- Executive profile at Pro Football Reference

Martin Edward Schottenheimer (/ˈʃɒtənhaɪmər/; September 23, 1943 – February 8, 2021) was an American professional football coach and linebacker who served as a head coach in the National Football League (NFL) for 21 seasons. He was the head coach of the Cleveland Browns from 1984 to 1988, the Kansas City Chiefs from 1989 to 1998, the Washington Redskins in 2001, and the San Diego Chargers from 2002 to 2006. Eighth in career wins at 205 and seventh in regular season wins at 200, Schottenheimer has the most wins among the league's head coaches to not win an NFL championship. After coaching in the NFL, he won a 2011 championship in his one season with the Virginia Destroyers of the United Football League (UFL). He was inducted to the Kansas City Chiefs Hall of Honor in 2010.

In his 21 seasons, Schottenheimer reached the playoffs 13 times and had only two losing records. Schottenheimer was also named NFL Coach of the Year with the Chargers in 2004 for leading a team that went 4–12 the previous year to a 12–4 record. However, he won only five of his 18 postseason games and never made a Super Bowl. Schottenheimer concluded his NFL career with a .613 regular season winning percentage, but a .278 playoff winning percentage, which is the only losing playoff record for an NFL coach with at least 200 wins. He is one of only three eligible NFL coaches with at least 200 regular season wins who has not been inducted to the Pro Football Hall of Fame.

== Early life and college career ==
Schottenheimer was born in Canonsburg, Pennsylvania.

Schottenheimer attended high school at Fort Cherry High School in McDonald, Pennsylvania. He went to the University of Pittsburgh and played on their football team from 1961 to 1964, earning second-team All-American honors as a senior.

== Professional career ==
Schottenheimer, a linebacker, was selected in the fourth round of the 1965 NFL draft by the Baltimore Colts and in the seventh round of the 1965 American Football League draft by the Buffalo Bills. He signed with the Bills and spent the next four seasons with Buffalo, including as a backup on the Bills' 1965 AFL Championship squad. Schottenheimer earned an AFL All-Star selection as part of that year's format change naming the entire Bills squad as All-Stars. Schottenheimer was still with the team during the 1969 preseason and intercepted two passes in a game against the Houston Oilers.

Some time between the 1969 preseason and regular season, Schottenheimer was sent to the Boston Patriots and spent the next two seasons with the Patriots. He was traded twice in two months prior to the start of the 1971 season, first to the Pittsburgh Steelers for Mike Haggerty in July, then to the Baltimore Colts for an undisclosed 1972 draft pick on 27 August.

Schottenheimer retired from football in 1971 and spent the next several years working in the real estate industry. He came out of retirement in 1974 to sign with the Portland Storm of the World Football League as a player-coach. He injured his shoulder prior to the start of the season, but stayed on with the Storm as their linebackers coach.

== Coaching career ==
Schottenheimer's professional coaching career began in 1974 when he became linebackers coach for the Portland Storm of the World Football League. In 1975, he was hired as a linebackers coach for the NFL's New York Giants and in 1977 became defensive coordinator. Schottenheimer spent 1978 and 1979 as the linebackers coach for the NFL's Detroit Lions.

=== Cleveland Browns ===
In 1980, he was hired as the defensive coordinator for the Cleveland Browns. On October 22, 1984, Schottenheimer replaced Sam Rutigliano as Browns head coach, after an October 7 game against the New England Patriots that bore an eerie resemblance to Cleveland's 1980 playoff loss to the Raiders, known as Red Right 88. The Browns were down 17–16 in the fourth quarter, and lost on an interception in New England's end zone as time expired. Chants of "Goodbye Sam" rang out from the stands after the New England game. Browns' owner Art Modell called the play-calling "inexcusable" and fired Rutigliano two weeks later. The 1–7 Browns then went 4–4 under Schottenheimer to finish the season with a 5–11 record.

The selection of University of Miami quarterback Bernie Kosar in 1985's supplemental draft helped usher in a new, largely successful era for Cleveland. With Schottenheimer, Kosar and many skilled players on offense and defense, the team achieved greater success than during the era of Rutigliano and former quarterback Brian Sipe. Though they became consistent playoff contenders in this era, the Browns did not reach the Super Bowl, falling one win short three times in the next four seasons.

While not stellar, the Browns' record won first place in a weak AFC Central in 1985, and the team looked poised to shock the heavily favored Miami Dolphins in a divisional playoff game on January 4, 1986. Cleveland surged to a 21–3 halftime lead, and it took a spirited second-half comeback by Dan Marino and the Dolphins to win it 24–21 and end the Browns' season. Despite the loss, many people expected Cleveland to be back the following year. "The Browns' days, the good days, are here and ahead of us", radio personality Pete Franklin said.

Despite a tumultuous offseason, 1986 marked Cleveland's entry into the ranks of the NFL's elite as Kosar's play improved and the defensive unit came together. Kosar threw for 3,854 yards to a corps of receivers that included Brian Brennan, Ozzie Newsome and rookie Webster Slaughter. On defense, cornerbacks Frank Minnifield and Hanford Dixon emerged as one of the NFL's premier pass-defending duos. After a slow start, the Browns rose to the top of the divisional standings, twice beating the Pittsburgh Steelers and ending a 16-game losing streak at Three Rivers Stadium. A 12–4 record earned Cleveland home-field advantage throughout the playoffs. The Browns' first opponents in the 1986 playoffs were the New York Jets. Kicker Mark Moseley made a field goal and won the game for the Browns 23–20. It was the team's first playoff victory in 17 years. The following week, the Browns matched up against the Denver Broncos in the AFC Championship game in Cleveland. Denver got out to an early lead, but Cleveland tied the game and then went ahead 20–13 in the fourth quarter. After the ensuing kickoff, the Broncos were pinned at their own 2-yard line with 5:32 remaining. Denver quarterback John Elway then engineered a 98-yard drive for a touchdown with the cold, whipping wind in his face. "The Drive", as the series came to be known, tied the score and sent the game into overtime. Cleveland received the ball first in the sudden-death period but was stopped by the Denver defense. On Denver's first possession, Elway again led the Broncos on a long drive ending with a Rich Karlis field goal that sailed just inside the left upright and won the game. The drive that tied the game has since come to be seen as one of the best in playoff history, and is remembered by Cleveland fans as a historic meltdown.

Although downtrodden by 1986's playoff defeat, Cleveland continued to win the following season. The Browns finished with a 10–5 record in 1987 and won the AFC Central for the third year in a row. In the divisional playoff round, the Browns faced the Indianapolis Colts and won 38–21. The win set up a rematch with the Broncos in the AFC Championship in Denver. The Broncos held a 21–3 lead at halftime, but a pair of rushing touchdowns and another by receiver Reggie Langhorne brought Cleveland to within seven points. Cleveland scored again in the fourth quarter, but the Broncos went ahead again by seven points on a touchdown with four minutes left. After Denver's kickoff, Kosar and the offense reached the Broncos' eight-yard line with 1:12 remaining. Kosar handed the ball to Earnest Byner on a second down. Byner ran left and broke inside with a clear path to the end zone, but was stripped by Denver's Jeremiah Castille just before crossing the goal line. The Broncos ran down the clock before intentionally taking a safety and winning 38–33. "The Fumble" quickly entered the lexicon of the Browns' modern-era disappointment, just as The Drive had a year before.

The 1988 season was marred by injuries to the Browns' quarterbacks. But despite the rotating cast of quarterbacks, Cleveland managed to finish with a 10–6 record and made the playoffs as a wild-card team. Cleveland met the Houston Oilers in the wild-card playoff round at home, and soon found themselves attempting to win with third-string quarterback Mike Pagel after an injury to second stringer Don Strock. Pagel put up a valiant effort, but the team lost the game 24–23. Three days after the Oilers loss, Schottenheimer and Modell announced that the coach would leave the team by mutual consent. Modell felt hiring an offensive coordinator was necessary to keep pace with the Oilers and the Bengals, a pair of divisional opponents then on the rise, but Schottenheimer said it "became evident that some of the differences we had, we weren't going to be able to resolve." Modell also wanted Schottenheimer's brother Kurt, who was the defensive coordinator, reassigned.

Schottenheimer remained with the Browns until 1988, amassing a 44–27 (.620) regular-season record and a 2–4 (.333) mark in the playoffs, including four playoff appearances, three AFC Central Division titles, and two trips to the AFC Championship Game (both against the Denver Broncos).

=== Kansas City Chiefs ===
Kansas City Chiefs' general manager Carl Peterson named Schottenheimer head coach on January 24, 1989.

In 1990, Schottenheimer's Chiefs got out of the starting gate quickly, winning three of their first four games. The club then struggled, splitting its next six contests. In an inspiring Veterans Day performance against Seattle, the Seahawks miraculously won, 17–16. That loss brought on the furious stretch run which saw the club record victories in six of its last seven outings. The Chiefs clinched their first post-season berth since 1986 with a 24–21 win at San Diego and finished the year at 11–5, marking the franchise's best finish since 1969. The Chiefs suffered a heart-breaking, 17–16 loss at Miami on January 5, 1991, in an AFC wild card game.

A 27–21 victory against the Los Angeles Raiders in the 1991 regular season finale gave the Chiefs the right to host the Raiders just six days later in the inaugural post-season game in Arrowhead's history, and the Chiefs' first home playoff game in 20 years. Thanks to six Los Angeles turnovers, the Chiefs registered their first post-season victory since Super Bowl IV with a 10–6 win in an AFC Wild Card Game on December 28. The following week, the Chiefs lost a 37–14 decision at Buffalo on January 5, 1992, in an AFC Divisional Playoff match-up as the Buffalo Bills' dynamic offense proved to be too much for the Chiefs.

The Chiefs got off to a 3–1 start in 1992, but was faced with a 4–4 record at the season's midpoint. Despite four consecutive victories, the club's post-season hopes still came down to the season's final contest. Owning a 9–6 record and needing one more victory to secure a playoff berth, the Chiefs defense tallied three touchdowns, as Kansas City claimed a 42–20 win against Denver to finish the season at 10–6. Despite the big win against the Denver Broncos, the Chiefs made a quick exit from the playoffs as quarterback Dave Krieg was sacked 7 times in a 17–0 AFC Wild Card loss against the San Diego Chargers on January 2, 1993.

The Chiefs spent the 1993 off-season installing the "West Coast offense" under the direction of new offensive coordinator Paul Hackett, who at one time served as quarterbacks coach to Joe Montana in San Francisco. On April 20, the Chiefs traded for Joe Montana, who directed the 49ers to four Super Bowl victories in the previous decade. On June 9, the club signed unrestricted free agent running back Marcus Allen, who had spent 11 seasons playing against the Chiefs as a member of the rival Raiders. Montana and Allen made their debuts in a 27–3 win against the Tampa Bay Buccaneers on September 5, marking Montana's first Opening Day appearance since 1990. Before taking the field in a Sunday night contest at Minnesota on December 26, the team learned it had clinched its first AFC West title since 1971 thanks to a Raiders loss earlier in the day. The team finished the season with an 11–5 regular season record, marking the club's fourth consecutive year with a double-digit victory tally.

Kansas City got its first true taste of "Montana Magic" as the Hall of Fame passer engineered a brilliant comeback in a 27–24 overtime win in an AFC Wild Card thriller against the Pittsburgh Steelers on January 8, 1994. Next, the Chiefs traveled to the Astrodome to face the red-hot Houston Oilers, who had won 11 straight games to conclude the regular season. The heavily favored Oilers opened up a 13–7 lead in the fourth quarter, but once again, Montana conjured a comeback, guiding the club to a 28–20 victory. The Chiefs playoff journey ended as the club made its initial AFC Championship Game appearance against the Buffalo Bills on January 23. Montana was knocked out of the contest early in the second half as Buffalo claimed its record fourth straight AFC title by a score of 30–13.

After starting the 1994 season 3–0, the Chiefs dropped back-to-back games before snapping an 11-game losing streak against Denver at Mile High Stadium on October 17 in a memorable Monday night contest. The Chiefs found themselves at 8–7 faced with a do-or-die regular season finale against the Raiders. At 9–7, Kansas City qualified for the playoffs for a fifth straight season. However, the Chiefs made a rapid departure from the playoffs in Montana's final professional contest at Miami on New Year's Eve. Montana and Dolphins' quarterback Dan Marino conducted a masterful first-half duel that ended deadlocked at 17–17, but Miami eventually prevailed by a 27–17 count.

Montana announced his retirement from football after 16 years in the NFL on April 18, 1995, and Steve Bono was promoted to the starting job. Immediately, the media predicted much gloom and doom for the 1995 Chiefs under Bono, leading Schottenheimer to quip during training camp that his club had been picked "sixth in a five-team division". Led by Bono, who merited a Pro Bowl berth, Kansas City posted an NFL-best 13–3 record with unblemished 8–0 marks in the AFC West and at Arrowhead. The Chiefs led the NFL in rushing offense (138.9 ypg), scoring defense (15.1 ppg) and turnover ratio (+12). A 24–3 win at Arizona on October 1 featured a surreal, 76-yard TD run on a bootleg by Bono as the Chiefs initiated a seven-game winning streak, the franchise's longest since 1969. Kansas City clinched a division title with a 29–23 victory at Oakland on December 3 en route to a franchise-best 13–3 regular season record and a team-record sixth consecutive postseason berth. The Chiefs were represented by seven players in the Pro Bowl, more than any other AFC team. In the playoffs, the Chiefs dropped an AFC Divisional Playoff Game against the underdog Indianapolis Colts on January 7, a blustery afternoon with the temperature at 11 degrees and a wind chill of −9. Three interceptions and three missed field goals from placekicker Lin Elliott contributed to the 10–7 loss at Arrowhead.

Kansas City entered the 1996 campaign with essentially the same lineup as the club boasted in 1995 and were featured on the cover of Sports Illustrated along with Green Bay as pre-season Super Bowl favorites. The club started the season with a 4–0 record for the first time in team history, but the season's lofty expectations came crashing down as the squad lost three of its next four games. A three-game winning streak, including a victory over the eventual Super Bowl champion Green Bay Packers, put the club back in post-season contention at 8–3. Needing just one more win to qualify for the playoffs, the Chiefs dropped their next two games: a 24–19 loss against Indianapolis and a 20–9 loss to the Bills. The Chiefs finished with a 9–7 record, missing the postseason for the first time since 1989 after the AFC's final Wild Card spot went to the Jacksonville Jaguars, who won a tiebreaker with Kansas City.

Kansas City dramatically retooled its roster in 1997, beginning with the signing of free agent quarterback Elvis Grbac on March 17. In addition to Grbac, the Chiefs lineup featured 11 new starters. All the new faces quickly formed a cohesive unit as the Chiefs posted a 13–3 record, an 8–0 Arrowhead record and their second AFC West title in three years. The Chiefs led the NFL in scoring defense, allowing a mere 14.5 points per game. The 232 total points permitted by the Chiefs in 1997 were the lowest tally ever allowed in a 16-game season in team history. Kansas City also broke a 63-year-old mark owned by the 1934 Detroit Lions by not permitting a second-half TD in 10 consecutive games. Grbac returned for the regular season finale against New Orleans Saints on December 21 as the squad finished the year with six consecutive victories, a first in team history. The Chiefs' 13–3 record gave them home field advantage throughout the AFC Playoffs. However, their playoff run was short-lived, as Kansas City lost to the eventual Super Bowl champion Denver Broncos 14–10 in the Divisional round.

The following year, with Elvis Grbac back at the helm, the Chiefs fell to 7–9 in 1998. Marty Schottenheimer took much of the blame for his failed attempts in the playoffs and conservative style of coaching ("Martyball"). Feeling burnt out, he announced his resignation on January 11, 1999, in a decision he stated was his biggest mistake.

Schottenheimer spent a total of 10 seasons as head coach of the Kansas City Chiefs, from 1989 to 1998 recording a 101–58–1 regular season record (.634) and had three division titles, seven playoff appearances, and a trip to the AFC Championship Game in 1993, losing to the Buffalo Bills.

=== Washington Redskins ===
From 1999 to 2000, Schottenheimer worked as a football analyst for ESPN, where he sometimes criticized Washington Redskins owner Daniel Snyder for being meddlesome. In a surprise to many observers, Schottenheimer was hired as head coach and head of football operations of the Redskins in 2001. Schottenheimer's Redskins became the first-team in NFL history to win five consecutive games immediately after losing its first five games. One of the Redskins' losses was a 45–13 loss to Schottenheimer's former team, the Chiefs. The Redskins won eight of their final eleven games to narrowly miss the postseason, matching the 8–8 record from the team's previous year, but moving up in the NFC East. Despite this, Snyder fired Schottenheimer on January 13, 2002. The team would regress under his successor Steve Spurrier, dropping to losing records during his two seasons at the helm.

=== San Diego Chargers ===
The San Diego Chargers hired Schottenheimer in 2002 following consecutive last-place finishes in the AFC West under Mike Riley. Schottenheimer's success did not come immediately, as the team posted a 4–12 record in 2003, thereby receiving the first overall pick in the 2004 NFL draft. Projected first overall pick Eli Manning also refused to play for the Chargers, although the team drafted him as part of a trade deal with the New York Giants to receive quarterback Philip Rivers, who had impressed Schottenheimer, in addition to three further draft picks.

Despite the slow start, Schottenheimer experienced his greatest regular season successes in San Diego. Following the 4–12 season, Schottenheimer led the Chargers to a 12–4 record and AFC West title in 2004, earning him NFL Coach of the Year honors. The season was the Chargers' first winning record and playoff berth since 1995 and their first division title since 1994. In 2006, Schottenheimer led the Chargers to a franchise-best 14–2 record, also his best regular season record and the league's best record that year. This regular season dominance, aided by the MVP season of running back LaDainian Tomlinson, secured top seeding for San Diego in the postseason.

However, both playoff runs would end in upsets during the Chargers' opener. In the Wild Card round of the 2004–05 postseason, the Chargers fell to the underdog New York Jets in overtime 20–17. Although the Chargers managed to rally back from a 17–7 deficit to force overtime, San Diego placekicker Nate Kaeding missed a field goal that would have won the game, leading to the Jets winning off a Doug Brien field goal. The 24–21 defeat to the New England Patriots in the 2006–07 Divisional Round proved to be even more devastating after the Chargers committed two critical miscues that caused them to surrender their 21–13 lead in the fourth quarter. While still leading by eight points, Chargers safety Marlon McCree caught a potential-game sealing interception on a Patriots' fourth down, but fumbled after attempting to return his interception. The Patriots recovered the fumble to obtain a new set of downs that led to them tying the game and taking the lead on their next drive. A final Chargers drive put them in position to force overtime off a field goal, but Kaeding missed the 54-yard attempt to secure the Patriots' victory. These two losses brought Schottenheimer's playoff record to 5–13.

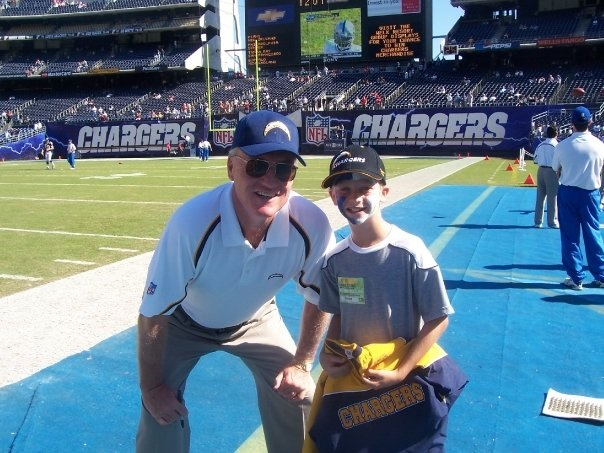
Schottenheimer with a Chargers fan in 2004 as San Diego's coach.

Three days after the loss to New England, Chargers president Dean Spanos announced that Schottenheimer would return for the final year of his contract, but Schottenheimer declined a one-year extension for 2008 worth $4.5 million. However, despite the earlier announcement and the 14–2 season, Schottenheimer was abruptly fired by San Diego on February 12, 2007. Spanos cited the recent changes to Schottenheimer's coaching staff and the "dysfunction" between Schottenheimer and general manager A. J. Smith. The former rationale from Spanos was based on offensive coordinator Cam Cameron and defensive coordinator Wade Phillips leaving for head coaching positions, while tight ends coach Rob Chudzinski and linebackers coach Greg Manusky departed for coordinator roles. Schottenheimer found it unfair to be blamed for the coaching turnover, noting that assistants cannot be blocked from interviewing for head coach positions.

According to Jim Trotter of the San Diego Union Tribune, Schottenheimer's insisting that his brother Kurt replace Phillips further strained the relationship between Spanos and Schottenheimer. Spanos had always been against the idea of allowing relatives to be on the same coaching staff, but had acquiesced to his son Brian being the Chargers' quarterbacks coach. Schottenheimer even went as far to book a flight to San Diego for his brother, against Spanos' wishes. This act of defiance increased the gap between Spanos and Schottenheimer.

Schottenheimer was still owed $4 million for the final year of his contract, as the firing was "without cause". Schottenheimer was replaced as San Diego head coach by Norv Turner. Following the Chargers' 1–3 start the next season, fans at Qualcomm Stadium voiced their displeasure with the firing by chanting Schottenheimer's name. Schottenheimer posted a 47–33 (.588) regular season record for the Chargers.

=== Virginia Destroyers ===
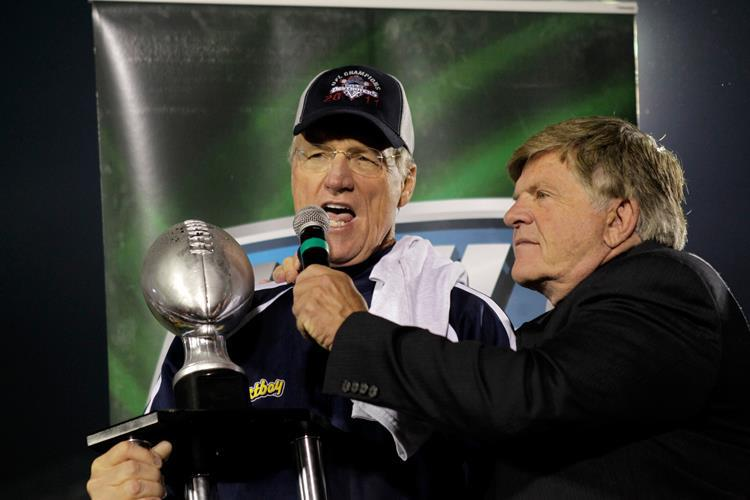
Schottenheimer holding the 2011 UFL Championship following the Destroyers' win over Las Vegas

In March 2011, the Virginia Destroyers of the United Football League (UFL) hired Schottenheimer to be their first head coach and general manager, at the age of 67. In order to lure Schottenheimer to the Destroyers, league majority owner William Hambrecht personally guaranteed he would pay Schottenheimer's $1.1 million salary for the eight-game season. He led the Destroyers to a 4–1 record in the shortened 2011 regular season, earning a playoff berth with home-field advantage in his first season. Schottenheimer's efforts earned him the 2011 United Football League Coach of the Year award. His starting running back, Dominic Rhodes, was also named the MVP of the 2011 UFL season.

On October 21, 2011, the Destroyers derailed the two-time defending UFL champion Las Vegas Locomotives 17–3 in the 2011 UFL championship game at the Virginia Beach Sportsplex. It was Schottenheimer's first championship as a coach.

Schottenheimer abruptly resigned from the Destroyers shortly before the 2012 season, citing discomfort over unspecified issues facing the team that season and the failure of the team to meet also-unspecified conditions for his return. Schottenheimer later sued Hambrecht after not receiving any of the money he was owed. He received a settlement of approximately $800,000 in the lawsuit.

== Coaching philosophy and legacy ==
During his head coaching tenure, Schottenheimer's coaching strategy became known as Martyball. It emphasized a strong running game, a passing game that limited turnovers, and an aggressive defense. A conservative style, it was criticized for its blandness and it prevented Schottenheimer from winning big games, because he consistently played not to lose. While Schottenheimer's teams won eight division titles and made the playoffs 13 times in his 21 seasons, they never reached the Super Bowl. His three AFC Championship Game appearances all ended in defeat and after losing his third AFC Championship, Schottenheimer's final five playoff runs resulted in eliminations in the first game for his teams. Schottenheimer coached 4 teams to number 1 seeds and home-field advantage throughout the playoffs (1986 Browns, 1995 Chiefs, 1997 Chiefs, and 2006 Chargers); Cleveland made the AFC Championship Game, the other three went one-and-done in the Divisional Playoffs. Cleveland went 6-2 at home in 1986, the other three teams went undefeated at home in the regular season prior to the playoffs.

Schottenheimer's tenure as an NFL head coach concluded with 205 career wins and 200 regular season wins, both which are the most of a head coach to not reach or win an NFL championship. He is the only NFL head coach with at least 200 regular season wins to have a losing playoff record, not win a championship, and not be inducted to the Pro Football Hall of Fame. At the time of his retirement, he ranked fifth in regular season wins, behind only Hall of Fame coaches Don Shula, George Halas, Tom Landry, and Curly Lambeau. Schottenheimer currently ranks seventh in regular season wins and eighth in career wins.

Despite the postseason struggles of Schottenheimer's teams, a 2013 NFL.com article found that the regular season success and stability he brought was lost with his departures; teams that previously employed him would go on to hire a combined 17 full-time coaches and all had losing records at the time of the article. Fellow NFL coach and former Schottenheimer assistant Herm Edwards said that his playoff record "probably detracts [from his legacy] in the minds of some people, but I know it doesn't in the minds of people who have coached against him".

At Bill Cowher's Hall of Fame induction in 2021, Cowher said of Schottenheimer's legacy and impact on the NFL: "He was a master motivator, a stickler for detail and for him, it all started with preparation. This man has not only influenced the game, but he’s influenced anybody who has ever played for him, coached with him or coached against him, and I speak on behalf of many: Thank you coach, you did so much for so many, for so long. One day you will be in the Hall of Fame."

== Coaching tree ==
Many of Marty Schottenheimer's former assistant coaches have gone on to become NFL head coaches themselves. The list is as follows:

- Lindy Infante – Green Bay Packers (1988–1991), Indianapolis Colts (1996–1997)
- Bill Cowher – Pittsburgh Steelers (1992–2006)
- Tony Dungy – Tampa Bay Buccaneers (1996–2001), Indianapolis Colts (2002–2008)
- Gunther Cunningham – Kansas City Chiefs (1999–2000)
- Herm Edwards – New York Jets (2001–2005), Kansas City Chiefs (2006–2008)
- Mike McCarthy – Green Bay Packers (2006–2018), Dallas Cowboys (2020–2024), Pittsburgh Steelers (2026-present)
- Art Shell – Oakland Raiders (1989–94, 2006)
- Wade Phillips – Dallas Cowboys (2007–2010), Houston Texans (2013, interim)
- Cam Cameron – Miami Dolphins (2007)
- Tony Sparano – Miami Dolphins (2008–2011), Oakland Raiders (2014, interim)
- Hue Jackson – Oakland Raiders (2011), Cleveland Browns (2016–2018)
- Bruce Arians – Indianapolis Colts (2012, interim), Arizona Cardinals (2013–2017), Tampa Bay Buccaneers (2019–2021)
- Rob Chudzinski – Cleveland Browns (2013)
- Marc Trestman – Chicago Bears (2013–2014)
- Brian Schottenheimer – Dallas Cowboys (2025–present)

Some of Schottenheimer's former assistants have even fielded successful, winning teams on a regular basis. Additionally, other head coaches are connected to Schottenheimer through his former assistants.

Four of Schottenheimer's former assistants have reached and won the Super Bowl as NFL head coaches: Bill Cowher, Tony Dungy, Mike McCarthy and Bruce Arians. However, the four aforementioned head coaches won their Super Bowl titles by implementing offensive strategies that could, by and large, be considered more aggressive than Schottenheimer's Martyball strategy.

Bill Cowher coached the Pittsburgh Steelers from 1992 to 2006. Like Schottenheimer, Cowher built his offenses around a strong running game. For many years, he was able to do so thanks to the power running style of his Pro Football Hall of Fame running back, Jerome Bettis. However, Cowher was able to get consistent, and often strong, performances in the passing game from his quarterbacks (Neil O'Donnell, Kordell Stewart, Tommy Maddox and Ben Roethlisberger). Cowher's teams also made good use of trick plays on offense. A trick play helped the Steelers win Super Bowl XL against the Seattle Seahawks. In the fourth quarter, Pittsburgh wide receiver Antwaan Randle El, who was originally a quarterback at Indiana University, threw a 43-yard touchdown pass to fellow Steelers wide receiver Hines Ward. This play would prove to be the game-winning score, as Cowher's Steelers beat the Seahawks 21–10, giving him his first Super Bowl title. In 2020, Cowher earned induction into the Pro Football Hall of Fame.

When Tony Dungy was the head coach of the Tampa Bay Buccaneers from 1996 to 2001, he implemented a conservative, ball-control offense based primarily around running the ball and short, high-percentage passes. However, when Dungy coached the Indianapolis Colts from 2002 to 2008, he was more willing to base his offense on an aggressive, more robust passing game. This was largely possible due to the impressive passing skills of Dungy's Pro Football Hall of Fame quarterback, Peyton Manning. Another important factor was that the Colts' offensive coordinator, Tom Moore, was a man that Dungy already knew and trusted. Dungy is credited for turning both the Buccaneers and Colts into Super Bowl contenders as a head coach. He made ten straight trips to the NFL playoffs (1999–2001 in Tampa Bay, and 2002–2008 in Indianapolis). In Super Bowl XLI, Dungy's Colts defeated the Chicago Bears 29–17, and he became the first black head coach to win the Super Bowl, against another black head coach (and Dungy's former mentee), Lovie Smith. In 2016, Dungy earned induction into the Pro Football Hall of Fame.

Mike McCarthy coached the Green Bay Packers from 2006 to 2018, and ran a variation of the West Coast offense during his time as Packers head coach. He was able to field a potent passing attack with two superstar quarterbacks; first with Pro Football Hall of Fame quarterback Brett Favre (2006–2007), and then with Aaron Rodgers (2008–2018). McCarthy guided the Packers to a 31–25 victory over the Pittsburgh Steelers in Super Bowl XLV, with Rodgers being named the game's MVP. Under McCarthy's watch, the Packers were perennial playoff contenders, and Rodgers blossomed into one of the NFL's best quarterbacks, winning multiple NFL MVP awards along the way. McCarthy served as head coach of the Dallas Cowboys from 2020 to 2024. During this time, he was once again able to field potent passing offenses, largely centered around his star quarterback, Dak Prescott. However, McCarthy was unable to guide the Cowboys to a Super Bowl. He left the team when his contract expired at the end of the 2024 season.

Bruce Arians, who is another member of Schottenheimer's coaching tree, is well known for his motto, "No risk it, no biscuit," which encourages all his players to play aggressively. Additionally, Arians is noted for his work with quarterbacks. He served as quarterbacks coach for the Indianapolis Colts from 1998 to 2000, mentoring Peyton Manning. From 2004 to 2011, Arians was an offensive assistant for the Pittsburgh Steelers, working for both Bill Cowher and Cowher's successor, Mike Tomlin. Arians served as wide receivers coach from 2004 to 2006, and then as offensive coordinator from 2007 to 2011. With his help, the Steelers won Super Bowl XL and Super Bowl XLIII. During this time, Arians tutored and developed Ben Roethlisberger. In 2012, Arians came back to the Indianapolis Colts. He was named the team's interim head coach when Chuck Pagano, the team's regular head coach, was being treated for leukemia. As the Colts' acting head coach for 12 weeks, Arians guided Indianapolis to a 9–3 record and helped the team get back to the NFL Playoffs. He also became the first ever interim head coach to be named NFL Coach of the Year for his efforts. From 2013 to 2017, Arians served as the head coach of the Arizona Cardinals. He turned the Cardinals into a legitimate playoff contender while also getting productive seasons from his star quarterback Carson Palmer. In 2019, after spending the previous year as an analyst for the NFL on CBS, Arians became the head coach of the Tampa Bay Buccaneers, leading them to a 7–9 record. The following year, however, proved to be a triumphant year for him as coach. With the help of legendary quarterback Tom Brady, Arians led the Buccaneers to victory in Super Bowl LV. The Buccaneers defeated the Kansas City Chiefs, 31–9, and Arians became the oldest head coach to win a Super Bowl.

== Personal life ==
Schottenheimer married his wife in 1968. They lived on Lake Norman in North Carolina and had two children, a daughter and a son. His son Brian is the Dallas Cowboys head coach.

=== Health and death ===
In 2011, Schottenheimer was diagnosed with Alzheimer's disease. By the time the diagnosis was announced publicly in 2016, it had progressed slowly and he still maintained much of his memory and function, with him about to begin experimental treatment to slow the progression of the disease even further. In December 2018, Schottenheimer was still able to travel and made a brief pre-recorded speech supporting Chiefs head coach Andy Reid after Reid surpassed him in coaching wins. On February 3, 2021, his family announced he had been put into hospice care the previous Saturday. He died five days later on February 8, 2021, in Charlotte, North Carolina, at the age of 77.

== Head coaching record ==
=== NFL ===
Team	Year	Regular season					Postseason			
Team	Year	Won	Lost	Ties	Win %	Finish	Won	Lost	Win %	Result
CLE	1984	4	4	0	.500	3rd in AFC Central	–	–	–	–
CLE	1985	8	8	0	.500	1st in AFC Central	0	1	.000	Lost to Miami Dolphins in AFC Divisional Game
CLE	1986	12	4	0	.750	1st in AFC Central	1	1	.500	Lost to Denver Broncos in AFC Championship Game
CLE	1987	10	5	0	.667	1st in AFC Central	1	1	.500	Lost to Denver Broncos in AFC Championship Game
CLE	1988	10	6	0	.625	2nd in AFC Central	0	1	.000	Lost to Houston Oilers in AFC Wild Card Game
CLE Total		44	27	0	.620		2	4	.333	
KC	1989	8	7	1	.533	2nd in AFC West	–	–	–	–
KC	1990	11	5	0	.688	2nd in AFC West	0	1	.000	Lost to Miami Dolphins in AFC Wild Card Game
KC	1991	10	6	0	.625	2nd in AFC West	1	1	.500	Lost to Buffalo Bills in AFC Divisional Game
KC	1992	10	6	0	.625	2nd in AFC West	0	1	.000	Lost to San Diego Chargers in AFC Wild Card Game
KC	1993	11	5	0	.688	1st in AFC West	2	1	.667	Lost to Buffalo Bills in AFC Championship Game
KC	1994	9	7	0	.563	2nd in AFC West	0	1	.000	Lost to Miami Dolphins in AFC Wild Card Game
KC	1995	13	3	0	.813	1st in AFC West	0	1	.000	Lost to Indianapolis Colts in AFC Divisional Game
KC	1996	9	7	0	.563	2nd in AFC West	–	–	–	–
KC	1997	13	3	0	.813	1st in AFC West	0	1	.000	Lost to Denver Broncos in AFC Divisional Game
KC	1998	7	9	0	.438	4th in AFC West	–	–	–	–
KC Total		101	58	1	.635		3	7	.300	
WAS	2001	8	8	0	.500	2nd in NFC East	–	–	–	–
WAS Total		8	8	0	.500		–	–	–	
SD	2002	8	8	0	.500	3rd in AFC West	–	–	–	–
SD	2003	4	12	0	.250	4th in AFC West	–	–	–	–
SD	2004	12	4	0	.750	1st in AFC West	0	1	.000	Lost to New York Jets in AFC Wild Card Game
SD	2005	9	7	0	.563	3rd in AFC West	–	–	–	–
SD	2006	14	2	0	.875	1st in AFC West	0	1	.000	Lost to New England Patriots in AFC Divisional Game
SD Total		47	33	0	.588		0	2	.000	
Total		200	126	1	.613		5	13	.278	

=== UFL ===
Team	Year	Regular season					Postseason			
Team	Year	Won	Lost	Ties	Win %	Finish	Won	Lost	Win %	Result
VA	2011	3	1	0	.750	1st in UFL	1	0	1.000	Defeated Las Vegas Locomotives in 2011 UFL championship.
Total		3	1	0	.750		1	0	1.000	

== See also ==
- List of American Football League players
- List of National Football League head coaches with 50 wins
- List of National Football League head coaches with 200 wins

== Bibliography ==
- Henkel, Frank M. (2005). Cleveland Browns History. Mount Pleasant, South Carolina: Arcadia Publishing. ISBN 978-0-7385-3428-2.
- Knight, Jonathan (2003). Kardiac Kids: The Story of the 1980 Cleveland Browns. Kent, Ohio: Kent State University Press. ISBN 0-87338-761-9.
- Knight, Jonathan (2006). Sundays in the Pound: The Heroics and Heartbreak of the 1985–89 Cleveland Browns. Kent, Ohio: Kent State University Press. ISBN 978-0-87338-866-5.
