= 1985 Cleveland Browns season =

NFL team season

- Owner: Art Modell
- General manager: Ernie Accorsi
- Head coach: Marty Schottenheimer
- Offensive coordinator: Joe Pendry
- Defensive coordinator: Tom Bettis
- Home stadium: Cleveland Municipal Stadium

Results
- Record: 8–8
- Division place: 1st AFC Central
- Playoffs: Lost Divisional Playoffs (at Dolphins) 21–24
- Pro Bowlers: TE Ozzie Newsome; FB Kevin Mack; NT Bob Golic; OLB Clay Matthews Jr. OLB Chip Banks

The 1985 Cleveland Browns season was the team's 36th season with the National Football League.

This was the first of three consecutive AFC Central titles for the Browns. In Marty Schottenheimer's first full year as head coach, the Browns bounced back from a 5–11 season in 1984 to make the playoffs, despite a .500 season. Rookie quarterback Bernie Kosar led the Browns' offense; Ozzie Newsome's 62 receptions earned him a trip to the Pro Bowl; Earnest Byner and Kevin Mack each rushed for over 1,000 yards.

In the Divisional Playoffs, the Browns led the Miami Dolphins 21–3 in the third quarter, but in a scene that would be repeated 4 more times in the 1980s, the Browns collapsed down the stretch as the Dolphins came back to score three touchdowns to win the game 24–21.

In 2004, Football Outsiders named the 1985 Browns as one of the "worst playoff teams ever":

Opponents outscored them 287–294, and they were blown out in two of their last three games (31–13 by the Seahawks and 37–10 by the Jets). They took a 21–3 lead over the Dolphins in the playoffs, only to watch Dan Marino and company score 21 unanswered points to win the game.

The 1985 Browns are probably best known for having two 1,000-yard rushers in Earnest Byner and Kevin Mack. Despite that impressive feat, the Browns were only fourth in the AFC in team rushing yards. They were 13th in the conference in passing yards, thanks to rookie quarterback Bernie Kosar and journeyman Gary Danielson. What that team did very well was play defense and take advantage of a weak division. The Browns swept the 5–11 Oilers and split with the 7–9 Bengals and Steelers. A 28–21 win in week 15 against the Oilers proved to be the division capper: Kosar threw three TDs to open up a 28–7 lead, and the defense withstood a comeback driven by Warren Moon.

Until 2011, Cleveland's .500 winning percentage held the record for the lowest such percentage for a division winning playoff team in a non-strike season; the record was tied by the 2008 San Diego Chargers, then broken by the 2010 Seattle Seahawks. (Note: It has also been subsequently beaten by the 2014 Carolina Panthers and by Washington in 2020.) (Incidentally, in 1985 and 2008, teams with 11–5 records – Denver in 1985, New England in 2008—missed the playoffs.)

== Personnel ==
=== Staff ===
1985 Cleveland Browns staff
Front office: President and Owner – Art Modell; Executive Vice President of football operations – Ernie Accorsi; Head coaches: Head coach – Marty Schottenheimer; Offensive coaches: Offensive coordinator – Joe Pendry; Quarterbacks – Greg Landry; Running backs – Steve Crosby; Receivers – Richard Mann; Offensive line – Howard Mudd	Defensive coaches: Defensive coordinator – Tom Bettis; Defensive line – Tom Pratt; Linebackers – Tom Olivadotti; Special assistant – Darvin Wallis; Special teams coaches: Special teams – Bill Cowher; Strength and conditioning: Strength and conditioning – Dave Redding

=== Roster ===
1985 Cleveland Browns roster
Quarterbacks (QB): 16 Paul McDonald; 18 Gary Danielson; 19 Bernie Kosar; Running backs (RB): 28 Herman Fontenot; 30 Boyce Green; 33 Curtis Dickey; 34 Kevin Mack; 38 Johnny Davis; 44 Earnest Byner; Wide receivers (WR): 83 Fred Banks; 84 Glen Young; 85 Clarence Weathers; 86 Brian Brennan; 88 Reggie Langhorne; Tight ends (TE): 82 Ozzie Newsome; 87 Travis Tucker	Offensive linemen (OL): 61 Mike Baab C; 62 George Lilja G; 63 Cody Risien T; 68 Robert Jackson G; 69 Dan Fike G; 74 Paul Farren T; 75 Bill Contz T; 77 Rickey Bolden G/T; Defensive linemen (DL): 72 Dave Puzzuoli NT; 78 Carl Hairston DE; 79 Bob Golic NT; 91 Sam Clancy DE; 96 Reggie Camp DE; 99 Keith Baldwin DE	Linebackers (LB): 50 Tom Cousineau ILB; 51 Eddie Johnson ILB; 55 Curtis Weathers OLB; 56 Chip Banks OLB; 57 Clay Matthews OLB; 58 Scott Nicolas ILB; Defensive backs (DB): 20 Don Rogers FS; 22 Felix Wright SS; 27 Al Gross SS; 29 Hanford Dixon CB; 31 Frank Minnifield CB; 37 Chris Rockins FS; 47 Larry Braziel CB; Special teams (ST): 7 Jeff Gossett P; 9 Matt Bahr K	Reserve: 80 Willis Adams WR (IR); 26 Greg Allen RB (IR); 81 Harry Holt TE (IR); 97 Dave Morrill NT (IR); 24 Stanley Shakespeare WR (IR); 70 Larry Williams G (IR); Rookies in italics

== Schedule ==
Week	Date	Opponent	Result	Record	Venue	Attendance	Recap
1	September 8	St. Louis Cardinals	**L** 24–27	0–1	Cleveland Municipal Stadium	62,107	Recap
2	September 16	**Pittsburgh Steelers**	**W** 17–7	1–1	Cleveland Municipal Stadium	79,042	Recap
3	September 22	at Dallas Cowboys	**L** 7–20	1–2	Texas Stadium	61,456	Recap
4	September 29	at San Diego Chargers	**W** 21–7	2–2	Jack Murphy Stadium	52,107	Recap
5	October 6	New England Patriots	**W** 24–20	3–2	Cleveland Municipal Stadium	62,139	Recap
6	October 13	at **Houston Oilers**	**W** 21–6	4–2	Houston Astrodome	38,386	Recap
7	October 20	Los Angeles Raiders	**L** 20–21	4–3	Cleveland Municipal Stadium	77,928	Recap
8	October 27	Washington Redskins	**L** 7–14	4–4	Cleveland Municipal Stadium	78,540	Recap
9	November 3	at **Pittsburgh Steelers**	**L** 9–10	4–5	Three Rivers Stadium	51,976	Recap
10	November 10	at **Cincinnati Bengals**	**L** 10–27	4–6	Riverfront Stadium	57,293	Recap
11	November 17	Buffalo Bills	**W** 17–7	5–6	Cleveland Municipal Stadium	54,478	Recap
12	November 24	**Cincinnati Bengals**	**W** 24–6	6–6	Cleveland Municipal Stadium	74,439	Recap
13	December 1	at New York Giants	**W** 35–33	7–6	Giants Stadium	66,482	Recap
14	December 8	at Seattle Seahawks	**L** 13–31	7–7	Kingdome	58,477	Recap
15	December 15	**Houston Oilers**	**W** 28–21	8–7	Cleveland Municipal Stadium	50,793	Recap
16	December 22	at New York Jets	**L** 10–37	8–8	Giants Stadium	59,073	Recap
Note: Intra-division opponents are in **bold** text.

== Postseason ==
Round	Date	Opponent (seed)	Result	Record	Venue	Attendance	Recap
Divisional	January 4, 1986	at Miami Dolphins (2)	L 21–24	0–1	Miami Orange Bowl	75,128	Recap

== Standings ==
AFC Central
	W	L	T	PCT	DIV	CONF	PF	PA	STK
^{(3)} Cleveland Browns	8	8	0	.500	4–2	7–5	287	294	L1
Cincinnati Bengals	7	9	0	.438	4–2	5–7	441	437	L2
Pittsburgh Steelers	7	9	0	.438	3–3	6–6	379	355	L1
Houston Oilers	5	11	0	.313	1–5	4–8	284	412	L4
