= Mike Junkin =

American football player (born 1964)

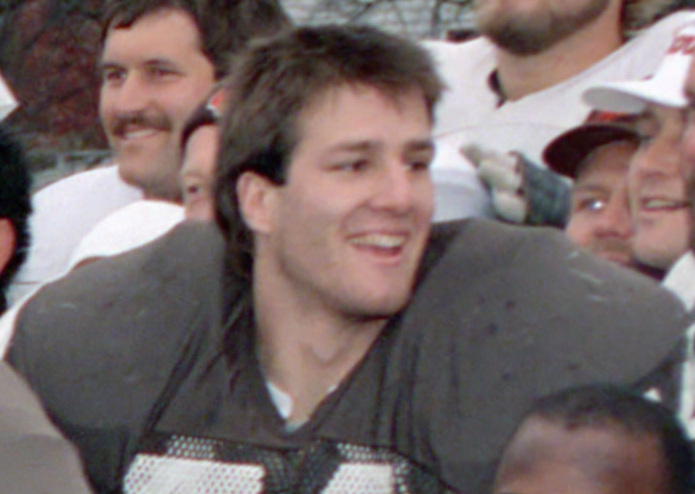
- Junkin with the Cleveland Browns in 1988

No. 54, 51
- Position: Linebacker

Personal information
- Born: November 21, 1964 (age 61); North Little Rock, Arkansas, U.S.
- Listed height: 6 ft 3 in (1.91 m)
- Listed weight: 241 lb (109 kg)

Career information
- High school: Belvidere (IL)
- College: Duke
- NFL draft: 1987: 1st round, 5th overall pick

Career history
- Cleveland Browns (1987–1988); Kansas City Chiefs (1989)

Awards and highlights
- Second-team All-American (1986); 2× First-team All-ACC (1985, 1986)

Career NFL statistics
- Games played: 20
- Games started: 7
- Stats at Pro Football Reference

Michael Wayne Junkin (born November 21, 1964) is an American former professional football player who was a linebacker for three seasons in the National Football League (NFL) with the Cleveland Browns and the Kansas City Chiefs. He played in 20 games over the course of his NFL career.

Junkin played four years of college football for the Duke Blue Devils. In the 1987 NFL draft, the Cleveland Browns traded up to select him with the fifth overall pick. He played in parts of two seasons for the Browns, both of which ended early due to injury. Junkin was then traded to the Kansas City Chiefs for a fifth-round selection and played in five more games. After his release from the Chiefs, he did not play another game in the NFL. His failure to establish himself in the NFL has caused him to be regarded as a draft bust.

== Early life and college ==
Junkin was born in North Little Rock, Arkansas, to Kirk, a United Airlines pilot, and Doris, a substitute teacher. His brother Trey Junkin was an NFL player as well. Junkin attended Belvidere High School in Belvidere, Illinois, and played tight end on the football team. In 1982, his senior year, he was the team's MVP and captain. He was named to the Belvidere Bucs Football Hall of Fame in 2013.

After graduating from high school, Junkin played college football at Duke University. He played in three games for the Blue Devils as a freshman. In one game against North Carolina State, Junkin had 25 tackles en route to a 27–26 Duke victory; head coach Steve Sloan stated afterwards that it was "one of the best games I have ever seen a freshman play." Between his freshman and sophomore seasons, Junkin went from 205 pounds to 240 to help get more playing time. As a sophomore, he spent the 1984 season as one of five starting linebackers on a modified Duke defense, which normally would have three or four linebackers. In his junior season, he was again a starting linebacker and finished the season with 162 tackles despite playing on an injured knee. Junkin started off his senior year with 15 tackles against Northwestern despite battling a head cold. Three weeks later in a game against Virginia, Junkin had 18 tackles and was named Atlantic Coast Conference defensive player of the week. Junkin graduated from Duke after the 1986 season as the school record-holder for career tackles with 512. Due to his performance his senior year, Junkin was named to the Second Team College Football All-American.

== Professional career ==
Junkin was selected in the first round with the fifth overall pick in the 1987 NFL draft by the Cleveland Browns. To acquire him, the Browns traded Chip Banks along with their first and second-round picks to the San Diego Chargers for their first and second-round picks. In regards to the selection, head coach Marty Schottenheimer stated that scout Dom Anile had watched him play, and compared his playing style to "a mad dog in a meat market." However, Anile saw him as a second-round talent despite the quote, and felt he was not worth the fifth overall selection, but Schottenheimer overruled his scouts and selected Junkin with that pick. The Browns' archrival, the Pittsburgh Steelers, were surprised at the pick as they had expected the Browns to select Shane Conlan after trading up for the pick; the St. Louis Cardinals selection of Kelly Stouffer and the Buffalo Bills selection of Conlan eventually allowed the Steelers to select future Hall of Fame cornerback Rod Woodson, haunting the Browns for years.

Entering the 1987 season, Junkin was projected to be the starting outside linebacker opposite Clay Matthews, Jr. despite playing inside linebacker in college, which generated criticism around the league as a transition that would be difficult for him to make. After a 16-day holdout, the Browns and Junkin agreed to a four-year deal worth nearly $2 million. After missing the first preseason game against the Cardinals, he made his debut against the New York Giants. In that game, he played the second half and failed to record a tackle. By the end of training camp, due to struggles learning the outside linebacker position, he made the roster, but lost the starting job to Anthony Griggs. After the Browns moved to a 4–3 defense for the second game against the Steelers, Junkin made his debut, and the plan was for him to gradually see more playing time each week. In early November, due to a combination of a players' strike and an injured wrist, Junkin was placed on the injured reserve list and replaced on the active roster by David Grayson.

Due to a combination of the Browns drafting Clifford Charlton and Junkin's desire to move back inside, the Browns planned to move him back to inside linebacker for the 1988 season. He spent training camp competing with Eddie Johnson for the second inside linebacker position alongside Mike Johnson, and by the end of preseason play, Junkin had won the starting job. In his first career start against the Kansas City Chiefs, Junkin had six tackles, including the first one of the game in a 6–3 Browns win. A month later, Junkin injured his knee, and was forced to miss several games. He returned to the team in early November, but Johnson had played so well in Junkin's absence that he spent the next few weeks as the backup inside linebacker. He was given the starting job again to end the season, but missed tackles and a lack of impact plays led to his second season being considered a disappointment.

In early 1989, Schottenheimer was fired as Browns head coach, and took the head coaching job with the Kansas City Chiefs. He still had faith in Junkin, unlike the Browns, and traded a fifth-round pick to bring him to Kansas City. Two weeks after the trade, a report came out that Junkin had taken steroids provided by a doctor to treat an injured ankle, and had failed a drug test at the scouting combine as a result. Entering the 1989 season, Junkin competed with Walker Lee Ashley for the second inside linebacker spot alongside Dino Hackett. Ashley won the job, and Junkin played five games before a shoulder injury sidelined him for the rest of the season. He was released from the Chiefs after season's end, and retired after not being signed by any team through the 1990 season.

Junkin became known as a draft bust due to his unproductive career. An ESPN article in 2008 noted Junkin noted as the eighth biggest draft bust of all time. He was also named one of the Cleveland Browns' worst three draft picks from 1995 or earlier.
