= Glen Young =

Glen Young may refer to:

- Glen Young (wide receiver) (born 1960), American football wide receiver
- Glen Young (gridiron football) (born 1969), Canadian gridiron football coach and former linebacker
- Glen Young (rugby union) (born 1994), Scottish rugby union player
