= Michael Dean Perry =

American football player (born 1965)

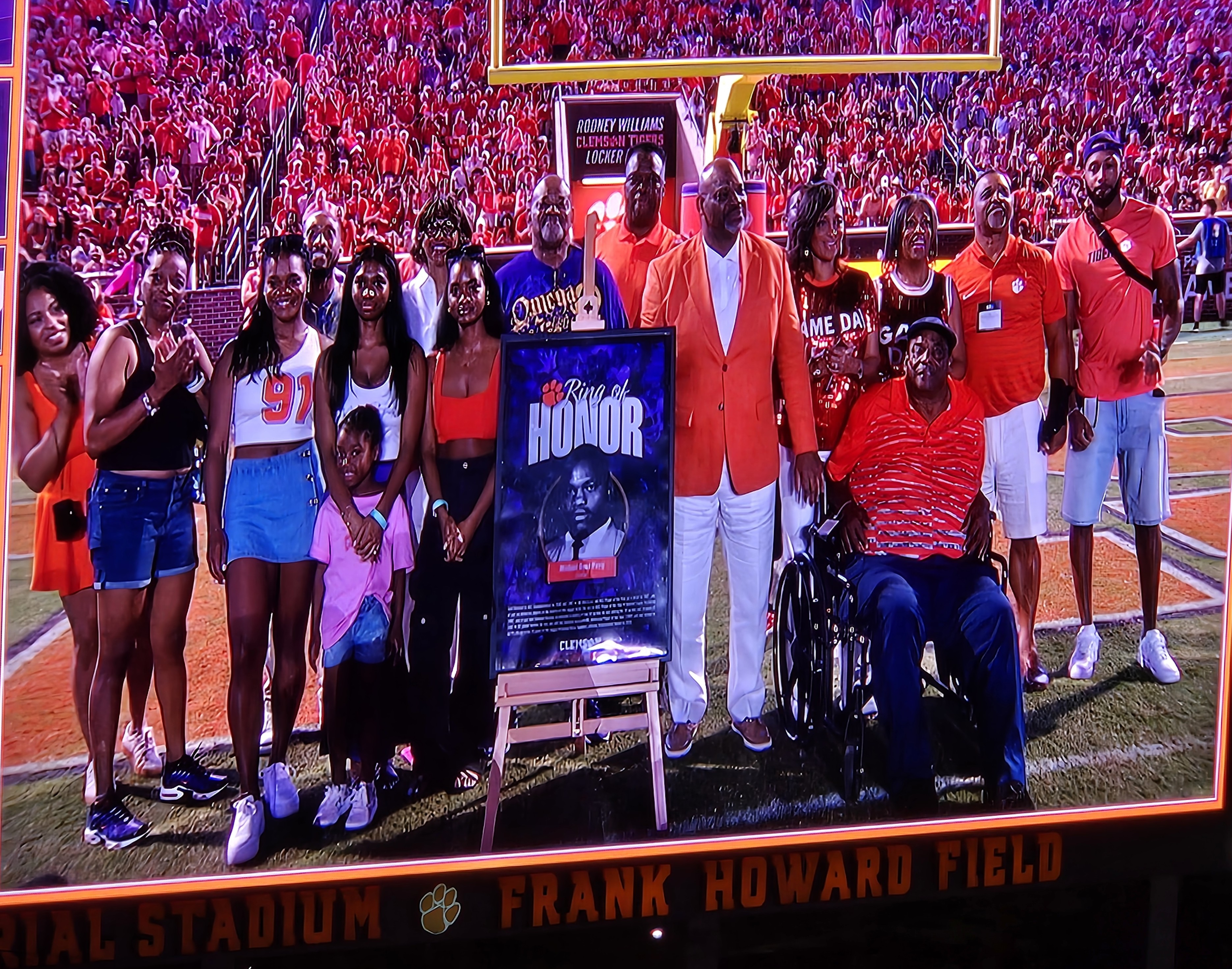

No. 92, 95
- Positions: Defensive tackle, defensive end

Personal information
- Born: August 27, 1965 (age 61); Aiken, South Carolina, U.S.
- Listed height: 6 ft 1 in (1.85 m)
- Listed weight: 285 lb (129 kg)

Career information
- High school: South Aiken
- College: Clemson
- NFL draft: 1988: 2nd round, 50th overall pick

Career history
- Cleveland Browns (1988–1994); Denver Broncos (1995–1997); Kansas City Chiefs (1997)

Awards and highlights
- 2× First-team All-Pro (1989, 1990); 2× Second-team All-Pro (1991, 1994); 6× Pro Bowl (1989–1991, 1993, 1994, 1996); PFWA All-Rookie Team (1988); Cleveland Browns Legends; First-team All-American (1987); ACC Player of the Year (1987); 2× First-team All-ACC (1986, 1987)

Career NFL statistics
- Tackles: 534
- Sacks: 61
- Forced fumbles: 13
- Stats at Pro Football Reference

Michael Dean Perry (born August 27, 1965) is an American former professional football player who was a defensive lineman in the National Football League (NFL). He is the younger brother of William Perry. His parents are Inez S. Perry and Hollie Perry Sr. of Aiken, South Carolina. He learned to play football from his older brothers. He attended South Aiken High School where he anchored the offensive and defensive line. He played college football for the Clemson Tigers and set the school record of 28 sacks (tied by defensive end Gaines Adams in 2006 and then broken by Vic Beasley in 2014). He was later drafted by the Cleveland Browns in the second round of the 1988 NFL draft. He played in the Pro Bowl six times and played for the Browns, the Denver Broncos, and the Kansas City Chiefs over his 10-year career.

Michael Dean Perry was one of the more televised players in Cleveland during his stay with the Browns. He also at one time had a McDonald's sandwich named in his honor. The sandwich was named the "MDP". The "MDP" was available only in the Metro Cleveland area. The sandwich at the time was larger than any offering made by McDonald's. It consisted of the same ingredients as a double cheeseburger with the addition of a patty and bacon.

== NFL career statistics ==
Legend
	Led the league
**Bold**	Career high

Year	Team	Games		Tackles				Fumbles		
Year	Team	GP	GS	Cmb	Solo	Ast	Sck	FF	FR	TD
1988	CLE	16	2	25	—	—	6.0	**2**	**2**	**1**
1989	CLE	16	16	92	—	—	7.0	**2**	**2**	0
1990	CLE	16	16	**107**	—	—	**11.5**	**2**	1	0
1991	CLE	16	15	81	—	—	8.5	**2**	0	0
1992	CLE	14	14	51	—	—	8.5	0	0	0
1993	CLE	16	13	81	—	—	6.0	**2**	**2**	0
1994	CLE	15	14	43	**33**	**10**	4.0	0	0	0
1995	DEN	14	14	39	**33**	6	6.0	1	0	0
1996	DEN	15	15	31	22	9	3.5	1	1	0
1997	DEN	9	8	11	8	3	0.0	1	0	0
1997	KC	1	0	4	1	3	0.0	0	0	0
Career		148	127	565	97	31	61.0	13	8	1
