= Reggie Langhorne =

American football player (born 1963)

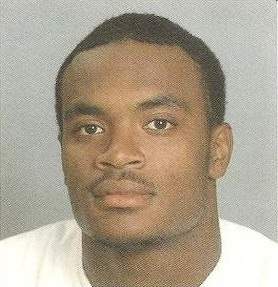

No. 88, 85
- Position: Wide receiver

Personal information
- Born: April 7, 1963 (age 63); Suffolk, Virginia, U.S.
- Listed height: 6 ft 2 in (1.88 m)
- Listed weight: 200 lb (91 kg)

Career information
- High school: Smithfield (Smithfield, Virginia)
- College: Elizabeth City State
- NFL draft: 1985: 7th round, 175th overall pick

Career history
- Cleveland Browns (1985–1991); Indianapolis Colts (1992–1993)

Career NFL statistics
- Receptions: 411
- Receiving yards: 5,446
- Receiving touchdowns: 19
- Stats at Pro Football Reference

Reginald Devan Langhorne (born April 7, 1963) is an American former professional football player. He played in the National Football League (NFL) for nine seasons from 1985 to 1993, playing for the Cleveland Browns and the Indianapolis Colts during that time.

== College career ==
After graduating from Smithfield High School, Langhorne played collegiate football for four years at Elizabeth City State University, an NCAA Division II school.

Langhorne is a member of Omega Psi Phi fraternity.

== Professional career ==
Langhorne was selected by the Cleveland Browns in the seventh round of the 1985 NFL draft. He played the role of the slot receiver, splitting time with a stacked receiving corps of Webster Slaughter and Brian Brennan, and later Eric Metcalf. Langhorne had arguably his best season as a Brown in 1988, amassing 780 receiving yards and 7 touchdowns. He continued to amass decent numbers, and signed with the Colts in 1992. He made an immediate impact on the Colts, leading the team in receptions and receiving yards. During the 1993 season, he had the best year of his career, reaching 1,000 receiving yards for the first time to go along with 85 receptions. However, Langhorne was cut along with many other veterans after that season, or "all the guys making over a million." He had already prepared a letter of resignation anyway, stating that he needed a break from the game. Langhorne has served as the President of the Eddie Johnson Memorial Foundation since 2003.

Chris Berman referred to him as "Foghorn" Langhorne.

== NFL career statistics ==
Legend
**Bold**	Career high

=== Regular season ===
Year	Team	Games		Receiving				
Year	Team	GP	GS	Rec	Yds	Avg	Lng	TD
1985	CLE	16	3	1	12	12.0	12	0
1986	CLE	16	15	39	678	**17.4**	66	1
1987	CLE	12	12	20	288	14.4	25	1
1988	CLE	16	16	57	780	13.7	**77**	**7**
1989	CLE	16	15	60	749	12.5	62	2
1990	CLE	12	11	45	585	13.0	39	2
1991	CLE	14	9	39	505	12.9	40	2
1992	IND	16	12	65	811	12.5	34	1
1993	IND	16	16	**85**	**1,038**	12.2	72	3
		134	109	411	5,446	13.3	77	19

=== Playoffs ===
Year	Team	Games		Receiving				
Year	Team	GP	GS	Rec	Yds	Avg	Lng	TD
1985	CLE	1	0	0	0	0.0	0	0
1986	CLE	2	2	6	100	16.7	35	0
1987	CLE	2	2	3	87	**29.0**	**39**	**2**
1988	CLE	1	1	6	57	9.5	17	0
1989	CLE	2	2	**11**	**126**	11.5	27	0
		8	7	26	370	14.2	39	2

== After NFL ==
Langhorne opened up a bar and grille in Newport News, Virginia which he later sold. He now resides in the Cleveland, Ohio area and is a sales and leasing professional at Serpentini Chevrolet in Westlake, while still a part of the NFL as an inspector on Sundays and a Sports Analyst for CBS WOIO Cleveland.

During the NFL season, Langhorne is a weekly panelist on the local television pre-game show "Tailgate 19", on Cleveland CBS affiliate WOIO.
