= Ozzie Newsome =

American football player and executive (born 1956)

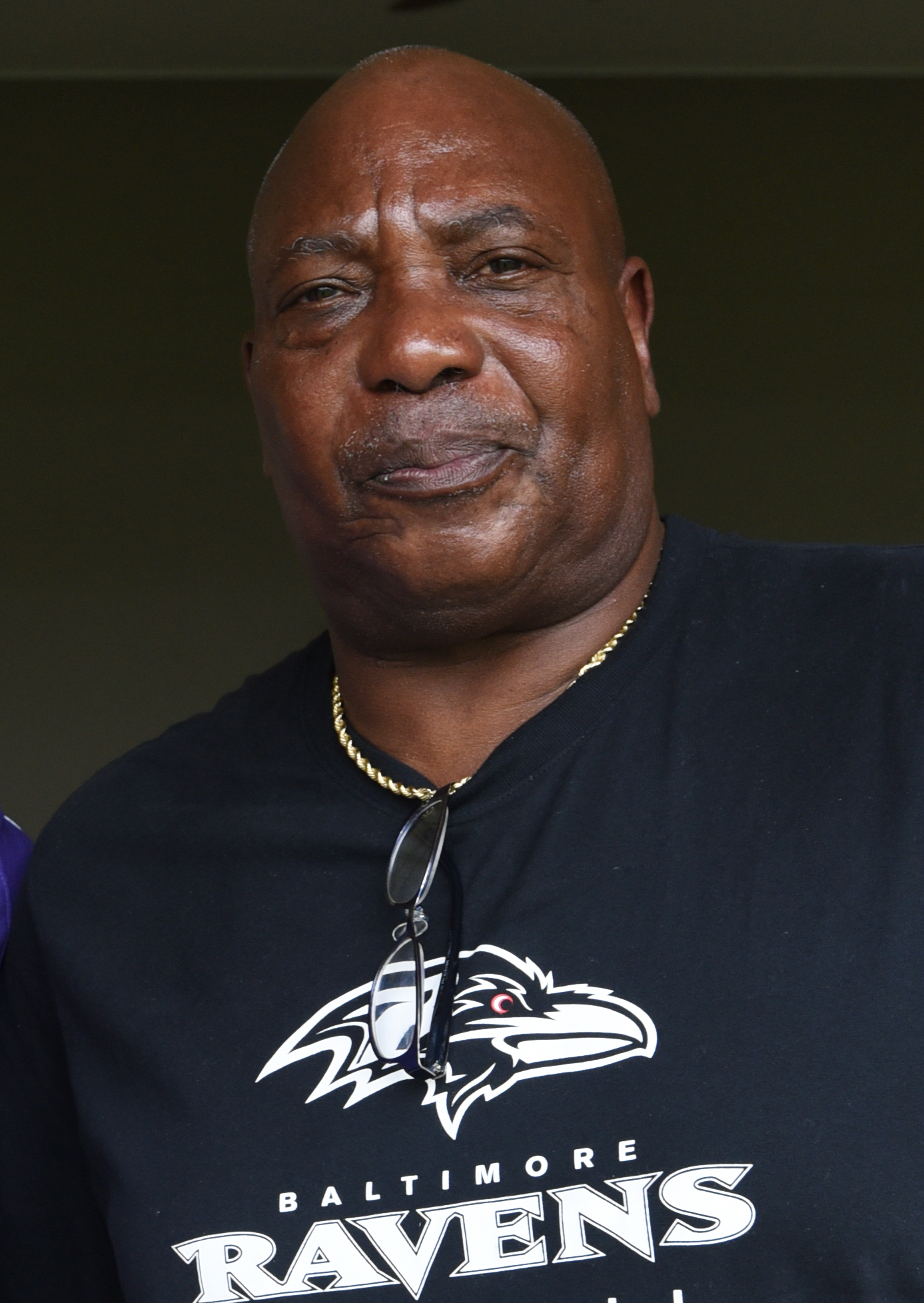
- Newsome in 2023

Baltimore Ravens
- Title: Executive vice president/player personnel

Personal information
- Born: March 16, 1956 (age 70); Muscle Shoals, Alabama, U.S.
- Listed height: 6 ft 2 in (1.88 m)
- Listed weight: 232 lb (105 kg)

Career information
- Position: Tight end (No. 82)
- High school: Colbert County (Leighton, Alabama)
- College: Alabama (1974–1977)
- NFL draft: 1978: 1st round, 23rd overall pick

Career history

Playing
- Cleveland Browns (1978–1990)

Operations
- Cleveland Browns (1991–1995); Assignment scout (1991–1992); Assistant to the head coach/offense/pro personnel (1993); Director of pro personnel (1994–1995); Baltimore Ravens (1996–present); Executive vice president/player personnel (1996–2001); General manager (2002–2018); Executive vice president/player personnel (2019–present)

Awards and highlights
- As player: 2× First-team All-Pro (1979, 1984); 5× Second-team All-Pro (1980–1983, 1985); 3× Pro Bowl (1981, 1984, 1985); NFL 1980s All-Decade Team; PFWA All-Rookie Team (1978); Cleveland Browns Ring of Honor; Consensus All-American (1977); 2× First-team All-SEC (1976, 1977); As executive: 2× Super Bowl champion (XXXV, XLVII)

Career NFL statistics
- Receptions: 662
- Receiving yards: 7,980
- Receiving touchdowns: 47
- Stats at Pro Football Reference
- Pro Football Hall of Fame
- College Football Hall of Fame

Ozzie Newsome Jr. (born March 16, 1956) is an American professional football executive and former player who is the executive vice president of player personnel of the Baltimore Ravens of the National Football League (NFL). Newsome was a tight end for the NFL's Cleveland Browns, and was general manager of the Ravens from 1996 to 2018. Newsome has been inducted into both the College Football Hall of Fame (1994) and the Pro Football Hall of Fame (1999).

== College career ==
Newsome played for Alabama, where he started for all four years of his college career. Nicknamed "The Wizard of Oz", Newsome made the College Football All-America Team in 1977 and assisted the Crimson Tide to a 42–6 overall record during his four seasons. In total, Newsome amassed 102 receptions for 2,070 receiving yards and 16 touchdowns, while also returning 40 punts for 301 yards. His 20.3 average yards per catch was a Southeastern Conference record for over 20 years. Newsome was named the Alabama Player of the Decade for the 1970s. He was a two-time All-SEC player (in 1976 and 1977), and named SEC Lineman of the Year in 1977 by the Birmingham Quarterback Club and the Atlanta Touchdown Club. In 1994, Newsome was enshrined in the College Football Hall of Fame. Coach Paul "Bear" Bryant called him "the greatest end in Alabama history and that includes Don Hutson. A total team player, fine blocker, outstanding leader, great receiver with concentration, speed, hands."

== Professional career ==
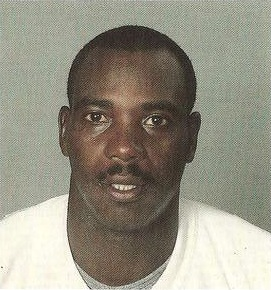
Newsome in 1985

Newsome was drafted in the first round with the 23rd pick in the 1978 NFL draft for the Cleveland Browns. He was named the Browns' Offensive Player of the Year his rookie year, the first time in 25 years that a rookie had received that honor. Newsome went to the Pro Bowl in 1981, 1984 and 1985. In 1984, Newsome set a franchise record for receiving yards in a game (191) that stood for 29 years until it was broken in 2013 by Josh Gordon (who recorded 237 and 261 yards in back-to-back games). In 1986, Newsome won the Ed Block Courage Award for playing with injuries, and in 1990, he won the Byron "Whizzer" White NFL Man of the Year Award for his community service. Though he was never able to play in a Super Bowl, Cleveland made the playoffs seven times during Newsome's career, and made three trips to the AFC championship game.

Newsome finished his career with 662 receptions and 7,980 yards, both Cleveland franchise records, and 47 touchdowns, fifth all-time. When he retired, he was the all-time leader in receptions and yards amongst all NFL tight ends. In 1999, Newsome was inducted into the Pro Football Hall of Fame.

== NFL career statistics ==
=== Regular season ===
Year	Team	Games		Receiving					Rushing					Fumbles
Year	Team	GP	GS	Rec	Yds	Y/R	Lng	TD	Att	Yds	Y/A	Lng	TD	Fum
1978	CLE	16	16	38	589	15.5	47	2	13	96	7.4	33	2	1
1979	CLE	16	16	55	781	14.2	74	9	1	6	6.0	6	0	0
1980	CLE	16	16	51	594	11.6	44	3	2	13	6.5	9	0	2
1981	CLE	16	16	69	1,002	14.5	62	6	2	20	10.0	14	0	0
1982	CLE	9	9	49	633	12.9	54	3	0	0	—	0	0	0
1983	CLE	16	16	89	970	10.9	66	6	0	0	—	0	0	0
1984	CLE	16	15	89	1,001	11.2	52	5	0	0	—	0	0	0
1985	CLE	16	16	62	711	11.5	38	5	0	0	—	0	0	0
1986	CLE	16	16	39	417	10.7	31	3	0	0	—	0	0	0
1987	CLE	13	13	34	375	11.0	25	0	0	0	—	0	0	0
1988	CLE	16	14	35	343	9.8	28	2	0	0	—	0	0	0
1989	CLE	16	13	29	324	11.2	31	1	0	0	—	0	0	0
1990	CLE	16	15	23	240	10.4	38	2	0	0	—	0	0	0
Career		198	191	662	7,980	12.1	74	47	18	135	7.5	33	2	3

== Football executive ==
Newsome was a front office executive with the Cleveland Browns from 1991 until their relocation to Baltimore in 1996; he has remained an executive with the Baltimore Ravens since their inaugural season. On November 22, 2002, Newsome was named the first general manager of the Ravens, making him the first African-American to occupy that position in the NFL.

Newsome earned his first Super Bowl ring when the Ravens defeated the New York Giants 34–7 in Super Bowl XXXV in 2001, and earned a second ring after the Ravens defeated the San Francisco 49ers in Super Bowl XLVII by a score of 34–31 in 2013.

Ravens owner Steve Bisciotti announced on February 2, 2018, that Newsome would step down following the 2018 season and assistant general manager Eric DeCosta would become the team's new GM. Although DeCosta is the team's general manager, Newsome is still employed by the Ravens in an active and significant role and he is listed as executive vice president on the Ravens Official Website.

== Other awards ==
In 2003, Newsome received the United States Sports Academy's highest honor, the Eagle Award, in recognition of his significant contributions to international sport.

Newsome is a member of the Cleveland Browns' "Ring of Honor", becoming a member of the first class inducted on September 19, 2010.
