= Bernie Kosar =

American football former player (born 1963)

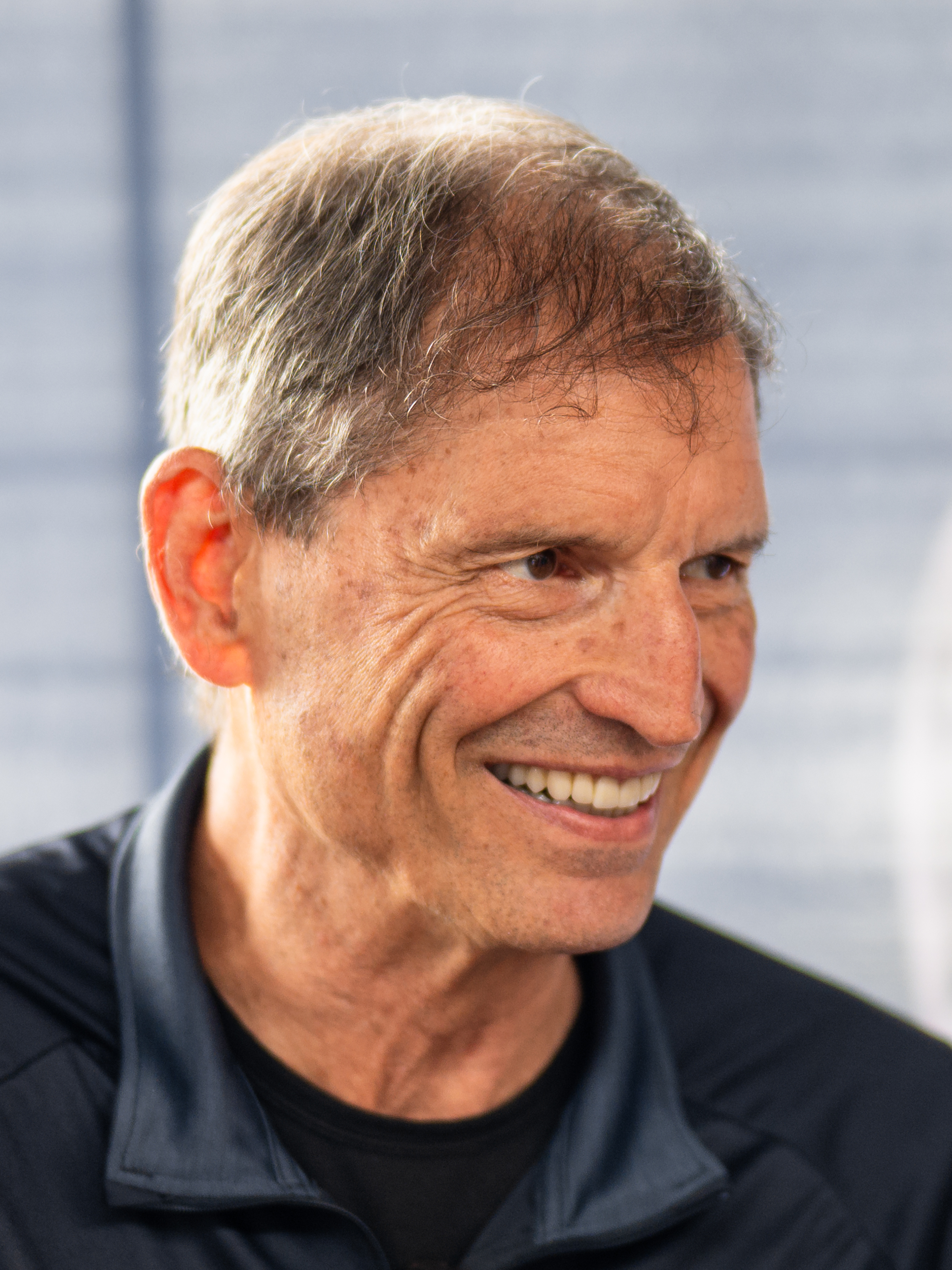
- Kosar in 2023

No. 19, 18
- Position: Quarterback

Personal information
- Born: November 25, 1963 (age 62); Youngstown, Ohio, U.S.
- Listed height: 6 ft 5 in (1.96 m)
- Listed weight: 214 lb (97 kg)

Career information
- High school: Boardman (Boardman, Ohio)
- College: Miami (FL) (1982–1984)
- Supplemental draft: 1985: 1st round

Career history
- Cleveland Browns (1985–1993); Dallas Cowboys (1993); Miami Dolphins (1994–1996)

Awards and highlights
- Super Bowl champion (XXVIII); Pro Bowl (1987); Cleveland Browns Legends; National champion (1983); Second-team All-American (1984); First-team All-South Independent (1983)

Career NFL statistics
- Passing attempts: 3,365
- Passing completions: 1,994
- Completion percentage: 59.3%
- TD–Int: 124–87
- Passing yards: 23,301
- Passer rating: 81.8
- Stats at Pro Football Reference

Bernard Joseph Kosar Jr. (born November 25, 1963) is an American former professional football player who was a quarterback in the National Football League (NFL). He played college football for the Miami Hurricanes, leading the team to a national championship in 1983. He subsequently played in the NFL for the Cleveland Browns from 1985 to 1993, the Dallas Cowboys in 1993, and Miami Dolphins from 1994 to 1996. He was the backup quarterback on the 1993 Cowboys team that won Super Bowl XXVIII.

== Early life ==
Kosar was born in Youngstown, Ohio and raised in suburban Boardman Township. He is of Hungarian descent.

He attended Boardman High School, where he earned Parade magazine All-American honors in 1981 as a senior and was Ohio's Division I "Player of the Year." He also gained recognition as a baseball player, especially for his pitching skills.

== College career ==
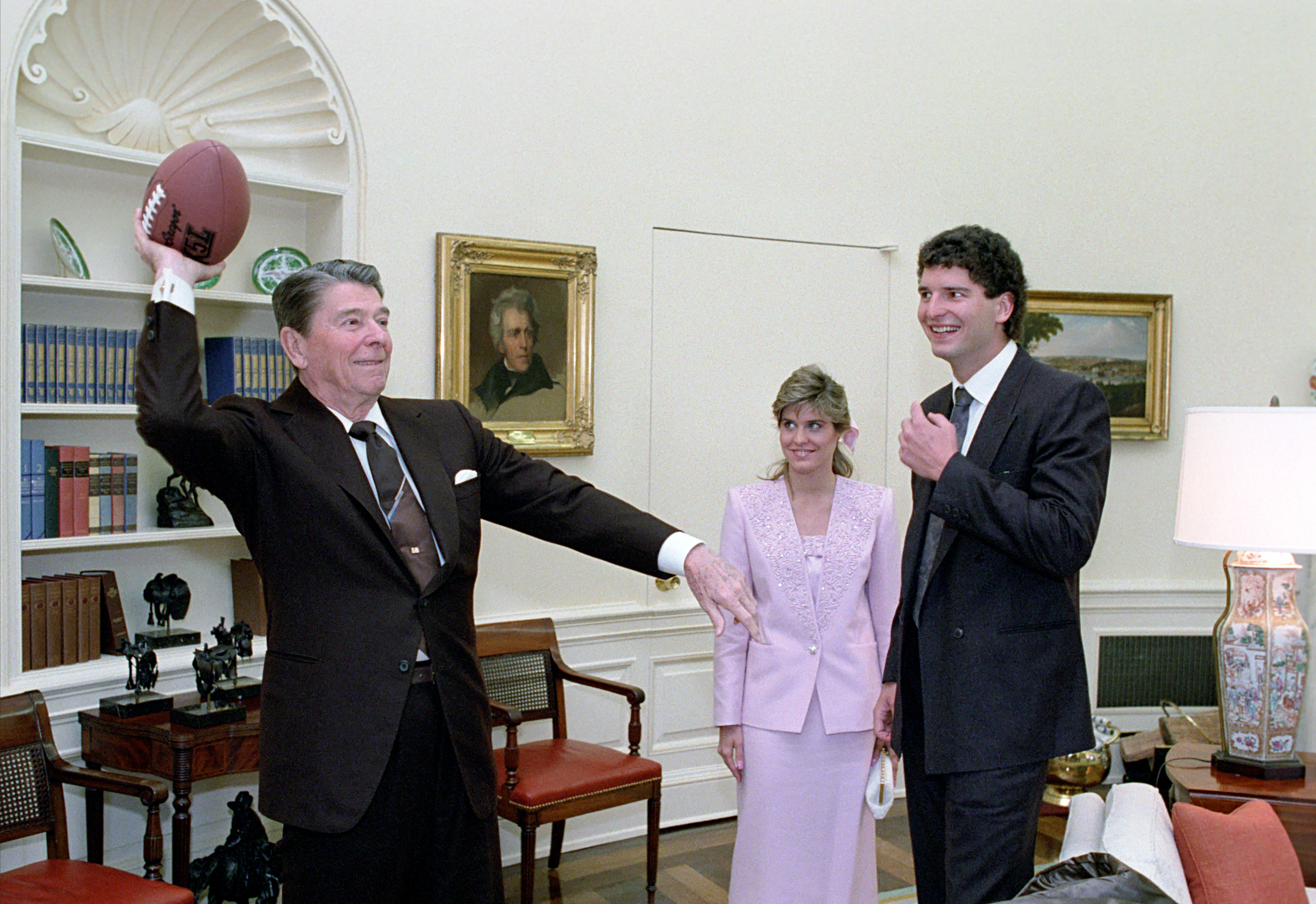
Kosar with U.S. President Ronald Reagan in the Oval Office in February 1987

Kosar was recruited by University of Miami head football coach Howard Schnellenberger, and Kosar committed to the University of Miami, which ran a passing-oriented offense and was beginning to emerge as one of the nation's premier college football programs. Kosar proved instrumental in establishing the University of Miami nickname "Quarterback U" in reference to the number of top quarterbacks the program produced.

After being redshirted in 1982, Kosar started all 12 games as a freshman in 1983. In the 1983 season, he completed 61.5 percent of his passes for 2,328 yards and 15 touchdowns, leading the Hurricanes to an 11–1 regular season and a berth in the Orange Bowl against top-ranked Nebraska, which had won 22 consecutive games. In the game, Kosar passed for 300 yards and two touchdowns, and the Hurricanes topped the Cornhuskers, 31–30, for Miami's first national championship. Kosar earned Orange Bowl MVP honors for his performance.

In 1984, he set Hurricane season records with 3,642 yards and 25 touchdowns, was a second-team All-American and finished fourth in Heisman Trophy voting. Kosar's career completion percentage of 62.3 percent is still a Hurricanes record.

Kosar threw for 447 yards and two touchdowns, completing 25 of 38 attempts, in the Hurricanes' November 23, 1984, 47–45 loss to Boston College when Flutie threw his famous "Hail Flutie" pass. Earlier the same year, Kosar watched as replacement quarterback Frank Reich of the Maryland Terrapins launched what was then the biggest comeback in college football history, coming back from a first-half deficit of 31–0 to win a 42–40 victory. The game and pass have been described as among the most memorable moments in sports history.

His final collegiate game was the 1985 Fiesta Bowl against UCLA, which the Hurricanes lost 39–37. In that game, Kosar completed 31 of 44 passes for 294 yards, two touchdown passes and one interception.

Kosar graduated from the University of Miami School of Business with a double major in finance and economics. He took 18 credit hours during the spring of 1985 and an additional six during the summer to graduate early.

Kosar was interviewed about his time at the University of Miami for the documentary The U, which premiered on ESPN on December 12, 2009.

== Professional career ==
=== NFL draft controversy ===
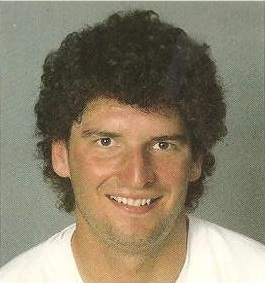
Kosar in 1985

In 1985, Kosar was a highly sought NFL prospect, described as having "an elite football IQ" and "being able to decipher a defense quicker than his coaches." But his route from the University of Miami to the National Football League was filled with widespread controversy and the use of highly unconventional transactional and draft NFL tactics.

In a March 14, 1985 press conference in Miami, Kosar announced that he was forgoing his final two years of collegiate eligibility at the University of Miami to enter the National Football League. Kosar grew up a Cleveland Browns fan, and also announced in the press conference that he would like to play for the Browns in his native Ohio.

NFL rules at the time permitted only college seniors and college graduates to enter the 1985 NFL draft, and Kosar was still a University of Miami underclassman in March 1985. To establish eligibility, Kosar announced he had arranged an expedited academic plan with 18 credits in spring 1985 and an additional six credits in the summer that would permit him to graduate from the University of Miami in time to meet the draft's eligibility requirements. In June 1985, the University of Miami notified the NFL that Kosar had met the course requirements to graduate.

Seeking to obtain Kosar in the NFL draft, the Minnesota Vikings on April 9, 1985, traded with the Houston Oilers to obtain a top draft selection and announced their intent to draft Kosar. Meanwhile, also seeking to draft Kosar, the Browns quietly traded their first round NFL draft selections for 1985 and 1986, their third round selection in 1985 and sixth selection in 1986 with the Buffalo Bills for the Bills' first pick in the 1985 supplemental draft, which paved the way for the Browns to select Kosar in the 1985 supplemental draft if Kosar entered it.

The NFL deadline for the submission of formal eligibility documents for the 1985 draft was April 15, 1985, and the Vikings learned that Kosar had not met the deadline. "I'm as confused as you are," Vikings coach Bud Grant said at the time about Kosar. "We put our bid on the line. It's up to the commissioner whether you need a verbal or a written commitment from the man. He dropped out of football, hired an agent and declared he was going in the draft. The only thing he didn't do was sign a letter."

Teams soon learned of the Browns' highly unorthodox trade with the Bills to obtain Kosar in the supplemental draft. Several teams asked then NFL Commissioner Pete Rozelle to prevent the unusual trade between the Browns and Bills. Rozelle, in turn, announced that he was giving Kosar until April 23 to submit eligibility documents for either the traditional or supplemental draft. On April 25, Kosar held a press conference, announcing his intention to skip the traditional draft and enter the supplemental draft, where he expected to be selected with the Browns' first selection.

The Houston Oilers, also seeking to draft Kosar in the traditional draft, threatened to sue to stop the entire draft unless Kosar was in it. Houston also appealed to the Vikings to join the suit. Kosar's agent, in turn, threatened to sue the NFL if Kosar was obligated to enter the traditional draft.

But when the Vikings refused to join the suit, the Oilers dropped it. Kosar submitted documentation announcing his eligibility and participation in the 1985 supplemental draft.

On July 3, 1985, the Browns used their first selection in the 1985 supplemental draft to select Kosar, offering him a five-year contract.

=== Cleveland Browns ===
The Cleveland Browns intended for Kosar to serve as Gary Danielson's backup in Kosar's rookie season, but Danielson injured his shoulder in the fifth week. Kosar completed half of his passes in the team's run-oriented offense that year, and the team squeaked into the playoffs with an 8–8 record, losing to the Miami Dolphins in the divisional playoffs.

Danielson was injured again in the 1986 preseason. By the time Danielson healed and returned, however, Kosar had established himself as the Browns' permanent starter. In a new, passing-focused offense, Kosar threw for 3,854 yards and finished second in the league with 310 completions. The Browns took the top seed in the American Football Conference (AFC) with a 12–4 record. In the divisional playoffs against the New York Jets, Kosar threw for a then-playoff-record 489 yards (a record since broken by Tom Brady in Super Bowl LII) in leading the Browns to a 23–20 comeback victory in double overtime. But the following week, John Elway's 98-yard drive in the AFC championship game kept the Browns out of the Super Bowl.

Kosar's most productive year statistically was 1987. In the strike-shortened season, he completed 62 percent of his passes for 3,033 yards and 22 touchdowns and led the AFC in quarterback rating. In an AFC championship rematch against Elway's Denver Broncos, Kosar threw for 356 yards and three touchdowns in a 38–33 loss, the game is remembered for a last minute fumble by Browns running back, Earnest Byner.

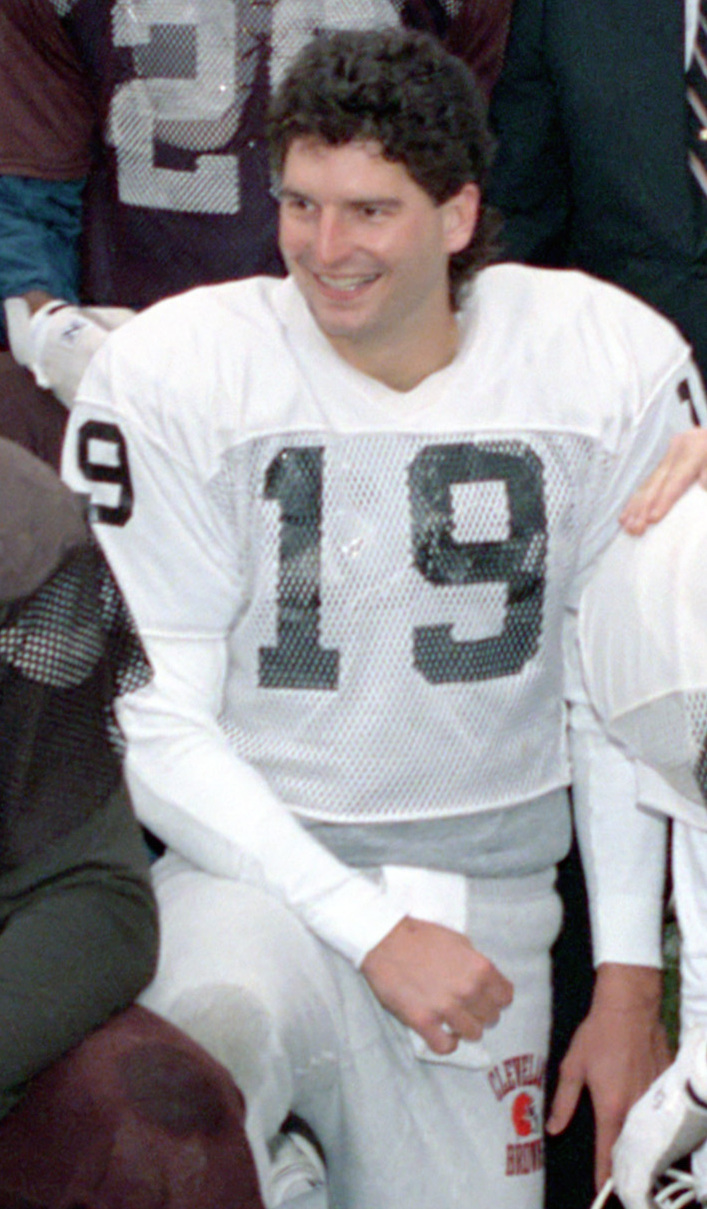
Kosar with the Browns in 1988

Kosar spent most of the 1988 season sidelined with injuries but came back to throw for 3,533 yards in 1989. That year, the Browns advanced to the AFC championship for the third time in four years, losing again to the Broncos in Denver.

Kosar set a record for consecutive playoff games with at least three touchdown passes (3 games) having thrown three scores against both Indianapolis and Denver in 1987, and three against Buffalo in 1989.

Kosar's later years in Cleveland were dampened by injuries and dwindling support around him. In 1990, Kosar threw a career-high 15 interceptions as the Browns went 3–13. He also started the 1990 season by setting an NFL record for consecutive pass attempts without an interception with 286. The following year, 1991, Kosar came back to throw for 3,487 yards and 18 touchdowns to only 9 interceptions. In 1990 and 1991, Kosar set league records by throwing 308 consecutive passes without an interception, which stood as an AFC League record for almost two decades.

In 1991, the Browns hired Bill Belichick as head coach. Following a 1992 season that saw Kosar miss nine games with a broken ankle and go 2–5 in the games that he started, Belichick signed quarterback Vinny Testaverde, also a former University of Miami quarterback, prior to the 1993 season. After falling from 3–0 to 3–2 in the 1993 season, Belichick benched Kosar in favor of Testaverde. An injury to Testaverde returned Kosar to the field. After a 29–14 loss to Denver in Week 10, the Browns released Kosar despite controversy and fan backlash.

According to a poll of Browns fans in 2019, Kosar was considered the "most beloved" Browns player in the franchise's history.

=== Dallas Cowboys ===
The Dallas Cowboys suffered an injury to starter Troy Aikman on the same weekend. After Kosar's release, the Cowboys promptly signed Kosar to a one-year, $1 million contract as the backup quarterback for rookie Jason Garrett. After an inefficient first nine minutes of the game against Phoenix with only two completions, Garrett was replaced by Kosar, who finished the rest of the game and started the next game for his only two meaningful game action in the regular season. During the NFC Championship Game against the San Francisco 49ers, Aikman was knocked out of the game with a concussion in the third quarter, with Kosar finishing the game, completing five of nine pass attempts for 83 yards and one touchdown. He earned his only Super Bowl championship as a backup in Super Bowl XXVIII, entering the game in the final play and knelt down to close the victory.

=== Miami Dolphins ===
Kosar spent the final two years of his NFL career with the Miami Dolphins as backup to Dan Marino. Kosar brought to the Dolphins a trick play that helped the Dolphins top the New York Jets in a crucial 1994 game. With the clock winding down and the Dolphins trailing by three, Marino pretended to spike the ball to stop the clock. He then threw the winning touchdown pass to Mark Ingram.

Kosar finished his 12-season career with 1,994 completions in 3,365 attempts for 23,301 yards and 124 touchdowns, 87 interceptions, and five rushing touchdowns. In November 1991, Kosar also set the NFL record for most consecutive completed passes without an interception, a record that stood until broken by Tom Brady on December 26, 2010.

== NFL career statistics ==
Legend
	Pro Bowl selection
	Won the Super Bowl
	Led the league
**Bold**	Career high

=== Regular season ===
Year	Team	Games			Passing								
Year	Team	GP	GS	Record	Cmp	Att	Pct	Yds	Avg	TD	Int	Lng	Rtg
1985	CLE	12	10	4–6	124	248	50.0	1,578	6.4	8	7	68	69.3
1986	CLE	**16**	**16**	**12–4**	**310**	**531**	58.4	**3,854**	7.3	17	10	72	83.8
1987	CLE	12	12	8–4	241	389	62.0	3,033	**7.8**	**22**	9	54	95.4
1988	CLE	9	9	6–3	156	259	60.2	1,890	7.3	10	7	77	84.3
1989	CLE	**16**	**16**	9–6–1	303	513	59.1	3,533	6.9	18	14	**97**	80.3
1990	CLE	13	13	3–10	230	423	54.4	2,562	6.1	10	15	50	65.7
1991	CLE	**16**	**16**	6–10	307	494	62.1	3,487	7.1	18	9	71	87.8
1992	CLE	7	7	2–5	103	155	66.5	1,160	7.5	8	7	69	87.0
1993	CLE	7	6	3–3	79	138	57.2	807	5.8	5	3	38	77.2
1993	DAL	4	1	0–1	36	63	57.1	410	6.5	3	**0**	86	92.7
1994	MIA	2	0	−	7	12	58.3	80	6.7	1	1	22	71.5
1995	MIA	9	2	0–2	74	108	68.5	699	6.5	3	5	31	76.1
1996	MIA	3	0	–	24	32	**75.0**	208	6.5	1	**0**	20	**102.1**
Career		126	108	53–54–1	1,994	3,365	59.3	23,301	6.9	124	87	97	81.8

=== Playoffs ===
Year	Team	Games			Passing								
Year	Team	GP	GS	Record	Cmp	Att	Pct	Yds	Avg	TD	Int	Lng	Rtg
1985	CLE	1	1	0–1	10	19	52.6	66	3.5	1	1	16	56.0
1986	CLE	**2**	**2**	**1–1**	**51**	**96**	53.1	**748**	7.8	3	4	48	71.9
1987	CLE	**2**	**2**	**1–1**	46	72	63.9	585	8.1	**6**	2	**53**	105.4
1989	CLE	**2**	**2**	**1–1**	39	73	53.4	461	6.3	5	3	52	78.6
1993	DAL	**2**	0	−	5	9	55.6	83	9.2	1	**0**	42	**123.8**
1995	MIA	1	0	−	1	1	**100.0**	10	**10.0**	0	**0**	10	108.3
Career		10	7	3–4	152	270	56.3	1,953	7.2	16	10	53	83.5

== Post-retirement ==
=== Sports-related ===
Since his NFL retirement in 1996, Kosar has been involved in several sports and business-related ventures. He hosted the Nestlé/Bernie Kosar Charity Classic at Tanglewood National Golf Club in Bainbridge Township, Ohio throughout the 1990s.

In 2001, Kosar purchased the Florida Panthers, a National Hockey League team, along with pharmaceutical businessman Alan Cohen.

In 2007, there was some speculation that Kosar might take the head coaching job at the University of Miami, his alma mater and where he holds a seat on the university's board of regents. Kosar acknowledged that he had considered taking the job before it was ultimately offered to Randy Shannon.

Kosar also purchased a minority share in the Arena Football League's Las Vegas Gladiators in 2007 and announced that the team would move to Cleveland and play under the name Cleveland Gladiators. On October 16, 2007, Kosar was named team president and CEO of the franchise. The Gladiators finished the 2008 regular season 9–7, earning them a playoff berth.

On October 17, 2009, Kosar was hired as a consultant for the Cleveland Browns.

In September 2022, Kosar launched "The Bernie Kosar Show" with local sports media company BIGPLAY. A sports podcast with Cleveland Browns cornerback Hanford Dixon interviewing athletes and discussing the Cleveland Browns past present, and future. In 2023 Kosar was involved in a lawsuit related to BIGPLAY.

=== Business and property ventures ===
Following the 2008–2009 recession, Kosar and his businesses declared bankruptcy on June 19, 2009, later revealing $9.2 million in assets and $18.9 million in debt. Kosar's initial bankruptcy filing was a Chapter 11 restructuring, but the U.S. Bankruptcy Court in Ft. Lauderdale on January 6, 2010, ordered the proceeding be changed to a Chapter 7 liquidation. Under the restructuring, Kosar's filings proposed protecting his NFL pension, though it was unclear if this will be permitted under a Chapter 7 proceeding.

In July 2010, it was reported that Kosar was on the verge of losing property in Geauga County, Ohio for unpaid back taxes totaling $173,557.90. In September 2010, the trustees of Auburn Township indicated it was considering purchasing the land in foreclosure.

Kosar has lent his name to Kosar's Wood-Fired Grill at the Hard Rock Rock Casino Northfield Park in Northfield, Ohio, which opened in December 2013.

Kosar has teamed with Ohio grocery chain Heinen's for a motivational and wellness seminar series based on Kosar's autobiography, Learning to Scramble, which he published in 2017.

In October 2023, Kosar announced a line of wellness products named U Matter Wellness Essentials under his Kosar Wellness brand, selling supplements including digestive enzymes, fermented vegetable powder and effervescent humic fulvic acid tablets. As part of the product launch, Kosar partnered with Foundation Health Solutions, an Ohio-based long-term care company. In 2023 Kosar was involved in a lawsuit related to Kosar Wellness.

A Jan. 5, 2024, Cleveland.com story by Peter Chakerian stated that Bernie Kosar just launched a new patented coffee blend, designed by Kosar himself to "boost immunity, protect against chronic diseases and strengthen heart health."

== Personal life ==
On June 22, 1990, Kosar married Babette Ferre whom he first met as a University of Miami student. They had four children. Ferre filed for divorce in 2005, alleging that Kosar had engaged in reckless spending, bad investments, and drug use. The divorce was finalized in 2007. Kosar dated Tami Longaberger of The Longaberger Company from 2009 to 2013.

Kosar was prominently featured in Broke, a 2012 ESPN 30 For 30 documentary about the financial problems common among high-earning athletes. According to one review of Broke, "[Kosar's] story proved to be the true heart of the film" with Kosar's upfront discussion of family problems and bad business decisions.

On September 29, 2013, Kosar was pulled over by law enforcement in Solon, Ohio for speeding and was arrested on suspicion of driving under the influence of alcohol. He later pleaded no contest to a lesser charge of reckless operation and received a $750 fine and suspended jail sentence.

Kosar's political views are undetermined, but was invited to the 2016 Republican National Convention, and spoke positively of host state Ohio and host city Cleveland in the context of the Convention being held there. In 2022, he appeared in an advertisement for Tim Ryan, the Democratic nominee for the U.S. Senate in Ohio.

=== Health ===
Kosar continues to deal with lingering health issues related to several concussions he sustained during his playing career and enrolled in a treatment program to alleviate his symptoms. Kosar says the experimental treatment has been helpful and has promoted it to other players who may have developed symptoms related to chronic traumatic encephalopathy. For over a decade, Kosar's symptoms have included insomnia, slurred speech, and ringing in his head.

In 2024, Kosar said he was diagnosed with cirrhosis of the liver and early symptoms of Parkinson's disease. On November 17, 2025, he received a liver transplant. The liver's donor had been a Browns fan.

== In popular culture ==
In the 2010 novel I Am Number Four by Pittacus Lore, protagonist John Smith finds an abandoned beagle named "Bernie Kosar" who becomes Smith's pet. In the 2011 film adaptation, a poster of Kosar is shown in Smith's new bedroom.

== Bibliography ==
- Kosar, Bernie; Stout, Craig (2017). Learning to Scramble. Cleveland, Ohio: Cleveland Landmarks Press. ISBN 978-0-936760-00-1.
