= Anthony Blaylock =

American football player (born 1965)

No. 24, 37, 47
- Position: Cornerback

Personal information
- Born: February 21, 1965 (age 61); Raleigh, North Carolina, U.S.
- Listed height: 5 ft 10 in (1.78 m)
- Listed weight: 190 lb (86 kg)

Career information
- High school: Garner (NC)
- College: Winston-Salem State
- NFL draft: 1988: 4th round, 103rd overall pick

Career history
- Cleveland Browns (1988–1991); San Diego Chargers (1991–1992); Chicago Bears (1993–1994)

Career NFL statistics
- Interceptions: 6
- Sacks: 5
- Fumble recoveries: 1
- Stats at Pro Football Reference

Anthony Darius Blaylock (born February 21, 1965) is an American former professional football player who was a cornerback in the National Football League (NFL). He played six seasons for the Cleveland Browns, San Diego Chargers, and Chicago Bears. He played college football for the Winston-Salem State Rams was selected by the Browns in the fourth round of the 1988 NFL draft with the 103rd overall pick.
