= Mark Harper (American football) =

American football player (born 1961)

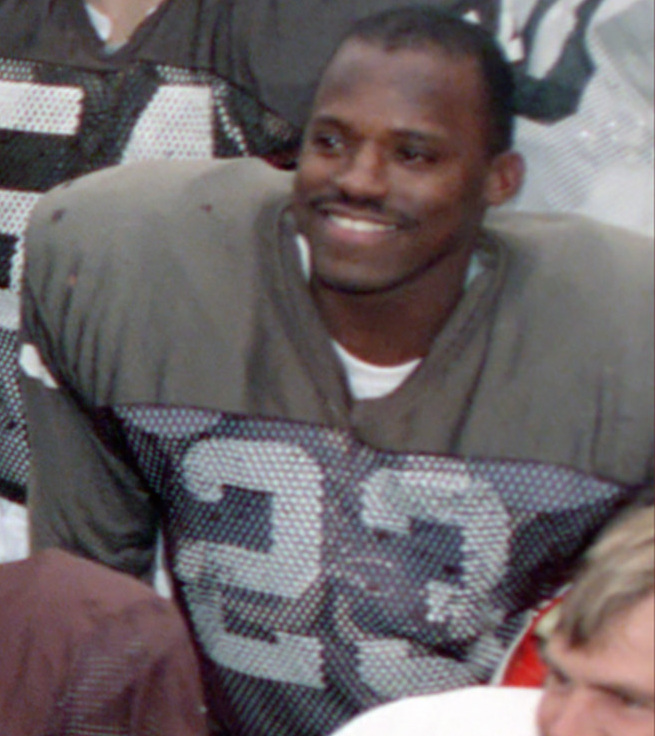
- Harper with the Cleveland Browns in 1988

No. 23, 26, 40
- Position: Cornerback

Personal information
- Born: November 5, 1961 (age 65); Memphis, Tennessee, U.S.
- Listed height: 5 ft 9 in (1.75 m)
- Listed weight: 174 lb (79 kg)

Career information
- High school: Northside
- College: Alcorn State
- NFL draft: 1986: undrafted

Career history
- Pittsburgh Maulers (1984); Jacksonville Bulls (1985); Cleveland Browns (1986–1991)

Career NFL statistics
- Interceptions: 8
- Fumble recoveries: 4
- Sacks: 3
- Stats at Pro Football Reference

Mark Harper (born November 5, 1961) is an American former professional football player who was a cornerback in the National Football League (NFL). He played college football for the Alcorn State Braves. He was signed by the Cleveland Browns as an undrafted free agent in 1986.
