= Marlon Jones (gridiron football) =

American football player (born 1964)

No. 90, 95
- Position: Defensive end

Personal information
- Born: July 1, 1964 (age 62); Baltimore, Maryland, U.S.
- Listed height: 6 ft 4 in (1.93 m)
- Listed weight: 260 lb (118 kg)

Career information
- High school: Milford Mill Academy (Milford Mill, Maryland)
- College: Central State
- NFL draft: 1986: undrafted

Career history
- Toronto Argonauts (1986–1987); Cleveland Browns (1987–1990); Tampa Bay Buccaneers (1991); Buffalo Bills (1992)*
- * Offseason or practice squad member only
- Stats at Pro Football Reference

Marlon Anthony Jones (born July 1, 1964) is an American former professional football defensive end who played for the Cleveland Browns of the National Football League (NFL) from 1987 to 1989. He played college football for the Central State Marauders. He missed the entire 1990 NFL season due to a stress fracture in his foot. Jones signed with the Tampa Bay Buccaneers in 1991 but was placed on the reserve/non-football injury list. He also played for the Toronto Argonauts of the Canadian Football League.
