= Stephen Braggs =

American football player (born 1965)

No. 36
- Position: Cornerback

Personal information
- Born: August 29, 1965 (age 61); Houston, Texas, U.S.
- Listed height: 5 ft 9 in (1.75 m)
- Listed weight: 173 lb (78 kg)

Career information
- High school: M. B. Smiley (Houston)
- College: Texas
- NFL draft: 1987: 6th round, 165th overall pick

Career history
- Cleveland Browns (1987–1991); Miami Dolphins (1992–1993)

Awards and highlights
- Third-team All-American (1986); First-team All-SWC (1986); World Bowl IX champion (coach)

Career NFL statistics
- Sacks: 4.5
- Interceptions: 5
- Fumble recoveries: 2
- Stats at Pro Football Reference

Stephen Lynn Braggs (born August 29, 1965) is an American former professional football player who was a defensive back for seven seasons in the National Football League (NFL).

== Early life ==
Braggs was born and raised in Houston, Texas and played scholastically at M. B. Smiley High School.

== College career ==
He played collegiately for the Texas Longhorns, where he was a four year starter and, as a senior, he was honored by Gannett News Service as a third-team All-American. That year, as a team captain, he led the Longhorns with 6 interceptions including 3 in one game against Texas Tech, and in forced fumbles with 5. He was also named all-conference and the team's MVP that year.x

In his freshman year, he helped the team win the 1983 Southwest Conference Championship, and achieve the #2 ranking before losing the national championship in the Cotton Bowl against Georgia. The next year he helped the Longhorns reach the 1984 Freedom Bowl.

In his junior year he led the Longhorns in pass breakups with 15, helping them to reach the 1985 Bluebonnet Bowl.

He graduated with a degree in Business Management and Organizational Communication.

== Professional career ==
Braggs was selected by the Cleveland Browns in the sixth-round of the 1987 NFL draft and was a member of the "Dawg Pound" with the nickname of "Puppy Dawg". He spent five seasons with the Browns, helping them reach the 1989 AFC Conference Championship game, and then finished his career with two seasons in Miami. For his career he recorded 5 interceptions, 2 fumble recoveries, and 4.5 sacks.

Pre-draft measurables
Height	Weight	Arm length	Hand span	40-yard dash	10-yard split	20-yard split	20-yard shuttle	Vertical jump	Broad jump	Bench press
5 ft 9 in (1.75 m)	176 lb (80 kg)	29 3/4 in (0.76 m)	9 3/4 in (0.25 m)	4.55 s	1.64 s	2.69 s	4.10 s	28.5 in (0.72 m)	9 ft 3 in (2.82 m)	7 reps
All values from NFL Combine

== Later life ==
While he was in the NFL, he was an owner operator of three Burger King Franchisee locations.

Braggs went into coaching, and was the defensive backs coach for the Berlin Thunder of NFL Europe in 2000 and 2001. In 2001, they won World Bowl IX. In 2015, he began coaching at Trinity Episcopal School of Austin.
