= Van Waiters =

American football player (born 1965)

No. 50, 54
- Position: Linebacker

Personal information
- Born: February 27, 1965 (age 61); Coconut Grove, Florida, U.S.
- Listed height: 6 ft 4 in (1.93 m)
- Listed weight: 240 lb (109 kg)

Career information
- High school: Coral Gables
- College: Indiana
- NFL draft: 1988: 3rd round, 77th overall pick

Career history
- Cleveland Browns (1988–1991); Minnesota Vikings (1992); Tampa Bay Buccaneers (1993)*
- * Offseason or practice squad member only

Awards and highlights
- Second-team All-American (1987); Third-team All-American (1986); First-team All-Big Ten (1986)

Career NFL statistics
- Sacks: 2
- Interceptions: 1
- Stats at Pro Football Reference

Van Allen Waiters (born February 27, 1965) is an American former professional football player who was a linebacker for five seasons in the National Football League (NFL).

Waiters was born and raised in Coral Gables, Florida and played scholastically at Coral Gables High School. He played collegiately for the Indiana Hoosiers. He was honored by the Associated Press as a third-team All-American his junior year, and a second-team selection as a senior.

Waiters was selected by the Cleveland Browns in the third-round of the 1988 NFL draft. He spent four seasons with the Browns, and scored a receiving touchdown against the Minnesota Vikings in 1989 on a pass from Mike Pagel on a fake field goal play. He finished his career playing one season with the Vikings in 1992.
