= Gregg Rakoczy =

American football player (born 1965)

No. 73, 71
- Position: Center

Personal information
- Born: May 18, 1965 (age 61); Medford Lakes, New Jersey, U.S.
- Listed height: 6 ft 6 in (1.98 m)
- Listed weight: 290 lb (132 kg)

Career information
- High school: Shawnee (Medford, New Jersey)
- College: Miami (FL)
- NFL draft: 1987: 2nd round, 32nd overall pick

Career history
- Cleveland Browns (1987–1990); New England Patriots (1991–1992)

Awards and highlights
- National champion (1983); Second-team All-American (1986); First-team All-South Independent (1985)

Career NFL statistics
- Games played: 81
- Games started: 48
- Stats at Pro Football Reference

Gregg Adam Rakoczy (born May 18, 1965) is an American former professional football player who was a center in the National Football League (NFL) for the Cleveland Browns from 1987 to 1990 and the New England Patriots from 1991 to 1992. Rakoczy played college football for the Miami Hurricanes.

Pre-draft measurables
Height	Weight	Arm length	Hand span	40-yard dash	10-yard split	20-yard split	20-yard shuttle	Vertical jump	Broad jump	Bench press
6 ft 5 3/4 in (1.97 m)	290 lb (132 kg)	32 1/2 in (0.83 m)	9 3/4 in (0.25 m)	5.41 s	1.81 s	3.08 s	4.34 s	24.5 in (0.62 m)	7 ft 9 in (2.36 m)	15 reps
All values from NFL Combine

He was selected in the second round of the 1987 NFL draft with the 32nd overall pick. He is originally from Medford Lakes, New Jersey, and attended Shawnee High School in Medford Township, New Jersey.
