= Thane Gash =

American football player (born 1965)

No. 30, 31
- Position: Safety

Personal information
- Born: September 1, 1965 (age 61); Hendersonville, North Carolina, U.S.
- Listed height: 5 ft 11 in (1.80 m)
- Listed weight: 200 lb (91 kg)

Career information
- High school: Hendersonville (Hendersonville, North Carolina)
- College: East Tennessee State
- NFL draft: 1988: 7th round, 188th overall pick

Career history
- Cleveland Browns (1988–1991); San Francisco 49ers (1992–1993)

Career NFL statistics
- Interceptions: 4
- Sacks: 2
- Touchdowns: 2
- Stats at Pro Football Reference

Thane Alvin Gash (born September 1, 1965) is an American former professional football player who played safety for four seasons for the Cleveland Browns and two seasons for the San Francisco 49ers in the National Football League (NFL). He was selected by the Browns in the seventh round of the 1988 NFL draft with the 188th overall pick. He had his best season in 1989, when he intercepted three passes and returned two of those for touchdowns.
