= Brian Brennan =

American football player (born 1962)

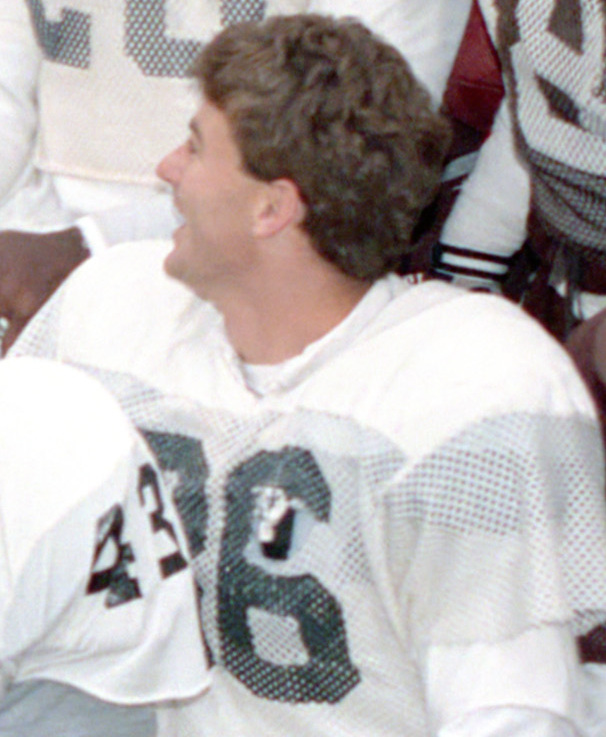
- Brennan with the Browns in 1988

No. 86, 83, 13
- Position: Wide receiver

Personal information
- Born: February 15, 1962 (age 64); Bloomfield, Michigan, U.S.
- Listed height: 5 ft 9 in (1.75 m)
- Listed weight: 178 lb (81 kg)

Career information
- High school: Brother Rice (Bloomfield)
- College: Boston College
- NFL draft: 1984: 4th round, 104th overall pick

Career history
- Cleveland Browns (1984–1991); Cincinnati Bengals (1992); San Diego Chargers (1992)

Awards and highlights
- Second-team All-American (1983); First-team All-East (1983); Scanlan Award (1983)

Career NFL statistics
- Receptions: 334
- Receiving yards: 4,336
- Receiving touchdowns: 20
- Stats at Pro Football Reference

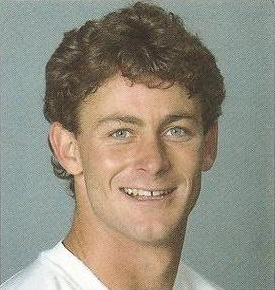

Brian Michael Brennan (born February 15, 1962) is an American former professional football player who was a wide receiver in the National Football League (NFL). He was selected by the Cleveland Browns in the fourth round of the 1984 NFL draft.

== Early life and college ==
He graduated from Brother Rice High School. He was a teammate of quarterback Doug Flutie at Boston College, earning Second Team All-American honors.

== Professional career ==
Brennan played in nine NFL seasons from 1984 to 1992 for the Browns, Cincinnati Bengals, and San Diego Chargers. One of his most memorable catches came in the 1986 AFC Championship Game. Late in the fourth quarter, Brennan hauled in a go-ahead touchdown pass from Bernie Kosar along the left sideline to give the Browns a 20–13 lead over the Broncos. Ultimately, the Browns lost 23-20 in OT, in a game known as "The Drive".

== NFL career statistics ==
Legend
**Bold**	Career high

=== Regular season ===
Year	Team	Games		Receiving				
Year	Team	GP	GS	Rec	Yds	Avg	Lng	TD
1984	CLE	15	5	35	455	13.0	52	3
1985	CLE	12	10	32	487	**15.2**	**57**	0
1986	CLE	16	0	**55**	**838**	**15.2**	**57**	**6**
1987	CLE	13	1	43	607	14.1	53	**6**
1988	CLE	16	1	46	579	12.6	33	1
1989	CLE	14	2	28	289	10.3	38	0
1990	CLE	16	5	45	568	12.6	28	2
1991	CLE	15	3	31	325	10.5	30	1
1992	CIN	9	0	16	166	10.4	21	1
1992	SDG	6	0	3	22	7.3	12	0
		132	27	334	4,336	13.0	57	20

=== Playoffs ===
Year	Team	Games		Receiving				
Year	Team	GP	GS	Rec	Yds	Avg	Lng	TD
1985	CLE	1	1	0	0	0.0	0	0
1986	CLE	2	0	**8**	**141**	**17.6**	**48**	1
1987	CLE	2	0	7	73	10.4	19	1
1988	CLE	1	0	2	34	17.0	25	0
1989	CLE	2	0	6	73	12.2	27	**2**
1992	CIN	2	0	1	8	8.0	8	0
		10	1	24	329	13.7	48	4

== Later life ==
Brennan later became an executive at Key Bank.

== College statistics ==
- 1981: 37 catches for 726 yards with 3 TD
- 1982: 12 catches for 305 yards with 3 TD
- 1983: 66 catches for 1,149 yards with 8 TD
