= Paul Farren =

American football player (born 1960)

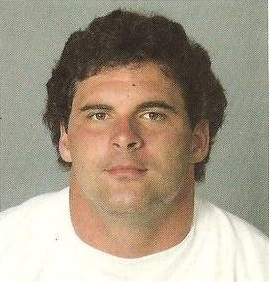

No. 74
- Positions: Tackle, guard

Personal information
- Born: December 24, 1960 (age 65); Weymouth, Massachusetts, U.S.
- Listed height: 6 ft 5 in (1.96 m)
- Listed weight: 272 lb (123 kg)

Career information
- High school: Cohasset (Cohasset, Massachusetts)
- College: Boston University
- NFL draft: 1983: 12th round, 316th overall pick

Career history
- Cleveland Browns (1983–1992)

Career NFL statistics
- Games: 132
- Games started: 91
- Fumble recoveries: 4
- Stats at Pro Football Reference

Paul Vincent Farren (born December 24, 1960) is an American former professional football player who was an offensive tackle for the Cleveland Browns of the National Football League (NFL) from 1983 to 1991. He was selected 316th overall in the 12th round by the Browns in the 1983 NFL Draft. Farren took over as the Browns' starting left tackle after Rickey Bolden was injured in 1989. Farren also played college football as an guard and center for the Boston University Terriers.
