= Glen Young (wide receiver) =

American football player (born 1960)

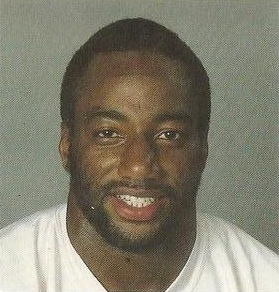

No. 89, 83, 84
- Position: Wide receiver

Personal information
- Born: October 11, 1960 (age 66); Greenwood, Mississippi, U.S.
- Listed height: 6 ft 2 in (1.88 m)
- Listed weight: 205 lb (93 kg)

Career information
- High school: Greenwood (Greenwood, Mississippi)
- College: Mississippi State
- NFL draft: 1983: 3rd round, 62nd overall pick

Career history
- Philadelphia Eagles (1983); St. Louis Cardinals (1984)*; Cleveland Browns (1984–1988)
- * Offseason or practice squad member only

Career NFL statistics
- Receptions: 11
- Receiving yards: 317
- Receiving touchdowns: 2
- Stats at Pro Football Reference

Glen Young (born October 11, 1960) is an American former professional football player who was a wide receiver for five seasons for the Philadelphia Eagles and Cleveland Browns of the National Football League (NFL). Young now teaches sports related and coaching classes at Mississippi State University where he was a standout kick returner. He was inducted into the Mississippi State University Hall of Fame in 2009.

== See also ==
- List of NCAA major college yearly punt and kickoff return leaders
