= Eddie Johnson (linebacker) =

American football player (1959–2003)

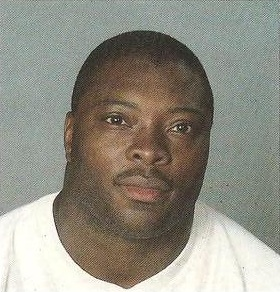

No. 51
- Position: Linebacker

Personal information
- Born: February 3, 1959; Albany, Georgia, U.S.
- Died: January 21, 2003 (aged 43); Cleveland, Ohio, U.S.
- Listed height: 6 ft 1 in (1.85 m)
- Listed weight: 220 lb (100 kg)

Career information
- High school: Dougherty (Albany)
- College: Louisville
- NFL draft: 1981: 7th round, 187th overall pick

Career history
- Cleveland Browns (1981–1990)

Awards and highlights
- Cleveland Browns Legends

Career NFL statistics
- Interceptions: 6
- Sacks: 5
- Fumble recoveries: 5
- Stats at Pro Football Reference

Eddie J. Johnson (February 3, 1959 – January 21, 2003) was an American professional football player who was a linebacker for 10 seasons with the Cleveland Browns in the National Football League (NFL). He played college football for the Louisville Cardinals. He wore number 51 during his time with the Browns and his nickname was "the Assassin". He was known for his fierce tackling style. He died of colon cancer in 2003 after a two-year illness.
