= Ben Hill Griffin Jr. =

American citrus businessman and politician (1910–1990)

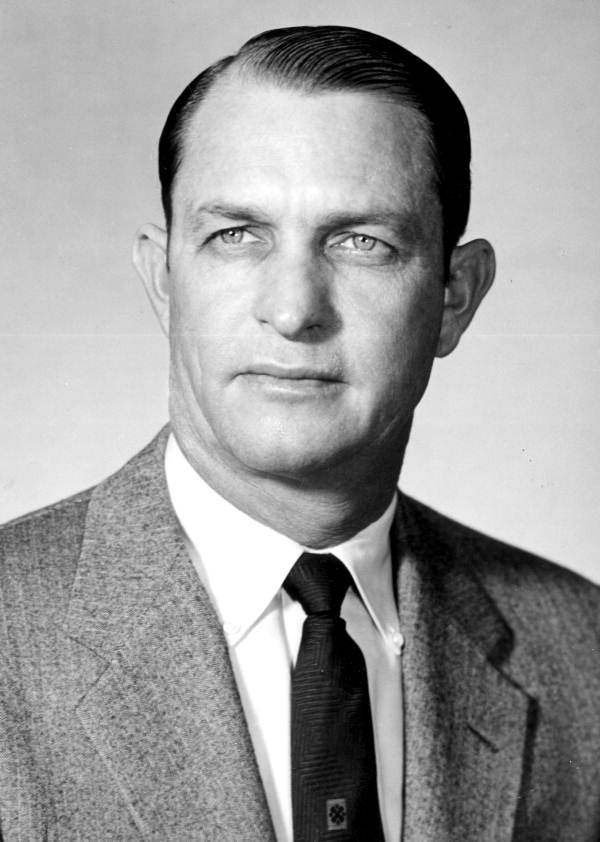

Member of the Florida Senate
- In office 1965–1968

Member of the Florida House of Representatives from Polk County
- In office 1956–1963

Personal details
- Born: October 20, 1910 Tiger Bay, Florida, U.S.
- Died: March 1, 1990 (aged 79) Avon Park, Florida, U.S.
- Party: Democratic
- Spouses: Laura Frances Pearce (m. 1933) Eleanor Frances Wise (m. 1971)
- Education: University of Florida
- Known for: Businessman; Citrus Grower; Politician; Philanthropist

Ben Hill Griffin Jr. (October 10, 1910 – March 1, 1990) was a prominent American businessman, citrus producer, politician, and philanthropist who was a native and resident of Florida. He was an alumnus of the University of Florida, a former legislator, one-time candidate for governor, and a patron of college sports and higher education in Florida. Several of his grandchildren remain active in Florida politics. Griffin is the subject of the final chapter of John McPhee's work of creative nonfiction Oranges.

== Early life and education ==
Griffin was born during a hurricane in the former town of Tiger Bay, near Fort Meade, Florida. He attended Frostproof High School in Frostproof, Florida, where he was responsible for starting the high school football program in 1929. After graduating from high school, Griffin studied economics, marketing, and agriculture at the University of Florida in Gainesville, Florida, where he was a member of Pi Kappa Phi Fraternity (Alpha Epsilon chapter).

== Citrus and agri-business ==
In 1933, Griffin left the University of Florida, after three years and without earning a degree, to find a job during the Great Depression. He unsuccessfully sought work in New York City, then returned home to Frostproof, Florida and began his business with a 10-acre (4.0 ha) orange grove, a wedding gift from his father, and built it into a citrus business empire.

In 1961, Griffin was named to the board of directors of Atlantic Land & Improvement Company, the land-holding subsidiary of the Atlantic Coast Line Railroad and commonly known as Alico. Alico, Inc. became a publicly traded corporation engaged in citrus fruit, sugarcane and sod production, cattle ranching, and forestry. Griffin acquired a majority of the outstanding stock of Alico in 1972 and became chairman of its board of directors in 1973. Griffin was also chief executive officer of Ben Hill Griffin, Inc., a family-owned business with citrus and other agriculture interests. In 1989, the year before his death, he was ranked 261st on the Forbes 400 list of richest Americans.

== Florida politics ==
A member of the a Democratic Party, Griffin was a member of the Florida House of Representatives, representing Polk County, Florida, from 1956 to 1963. He later served as a member of the Florida Senate, representing the 7th District from 1965 to 1966 and 27th District from 1967 to 1968. In 1974, he lost the Democratic primary for Governor of Florida to Reubin Askew.

== Philanthropy ==
Griffin and his family have been generous donors to higher education in Florida, especially his alma mater, the University of Florida; over the years, he donated more than $20 million to the university and its athletic programs. In 1989, Florida Field, the university's football stadium, was officially renamed Ben Hill Griffin Stadium at Florida Field. Floyd Hall, one of the university's historic academic buildings, was restored due in part to Griffin's donations and was renamed Griffin-Floyd Hall upon its reopening in 1992. For his support of the Florida Gators sports programs, Griffin was inducted into the University of Florida Athletic Hall of Fame as an "honorary letter winner" in 1982.

After Griffin's death, Alico, Inc., the company he built into an agribusiness, contributed approximately 760 acres (3.1 km^{2}) in Lee County, Florida for the development of Florida Gulf Coast University (FGCU), Florida's tenth state university. Alico Arena, FGCU's indoor sports arena, is named for the company. The elementary school in his hometown of Frostproof is also named for Griffin.

== Family and legacy ==
When Griffin died in 1990, he was survived by his wife Eleanor, a son, four daughters, and sixteen grandchildren. Griffin's only son, Ben Hill Griffin, III, carried on his father's family business and served as the CEO of Alico until 2004, and Alico was sold in 2014. Griffin's son continues to serve as the chairman of Ben Hill Griffin, Inc., and one of FGCU's primary academic buildings, Griffin Hall, is named for him. Griffin's grandson and namesake, Ben Hill Griffin, IV, serves as the current president of Ben Hill Griffin, Inc., which is one of the member companies of the Florida's Natural cooperative.

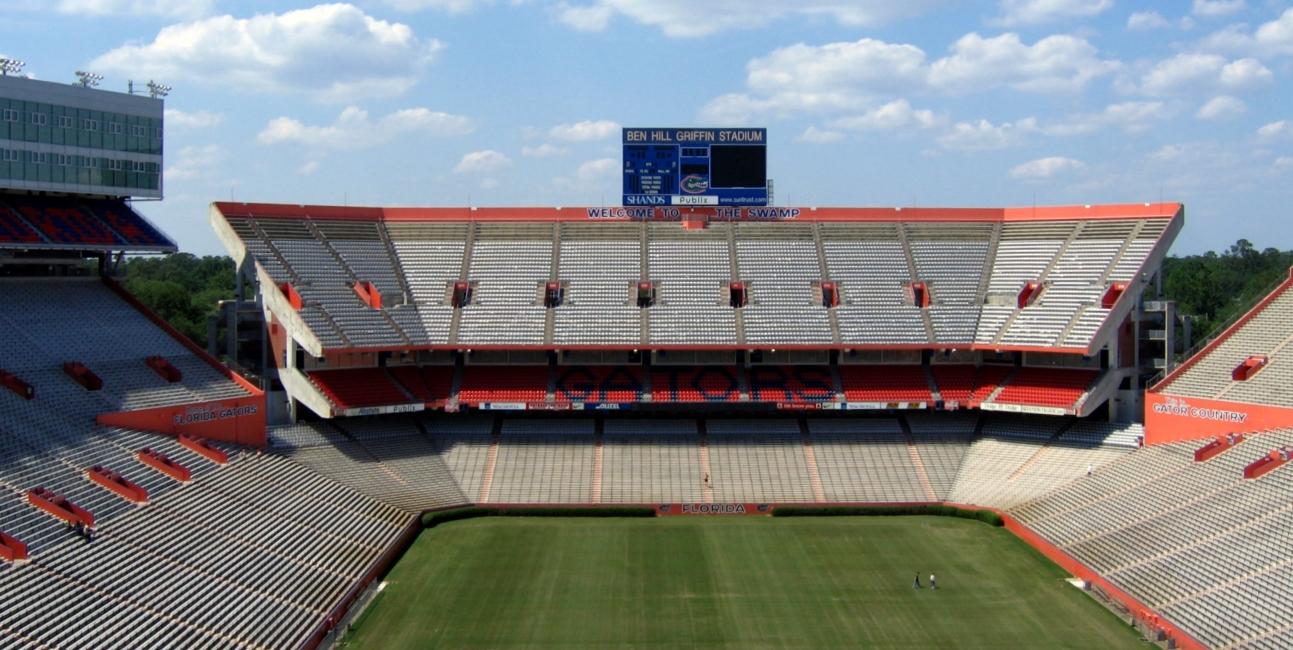
The University of Florida's football stadium, Ben Hill Griffin Stadium, viewed from the south endzone. The stadium was known as Florida Field until 1989, when it was officially rechristened "Ben Hill Griffin Stadium at Florida Field."

Following in the family footsteps, three of Griffin's grandchildren have served in elected political office in Florida. Republican Katherine Harris, a former member of the Florida Senate, former Florida Secretary of State (best known for her role in the disputed 2000 presidential election), and former United States Representative from Sarasota, is Griffin's granddaughter. Republican J.D. Alexander, a former member of both the Florida House of Representatives and Florida Senate, is his grandson. Republican Baxter Troutman, a former member of the Florida House of Representatives, is also Griffin's grandson.

In 1998, a panel of Florida historians and other consultants named Griffin one of the fifty most important Floridians of the twentieth century.

== See also ==
- Florida Gators football
- History of Florida
- History of the University of Florida
- List of Pi Kappa Phi alumni
- List of University of Florida alumni
- List of University of Florida Athletic Hall of Fame members
