= Dan Fike =

American football player (born 1961)

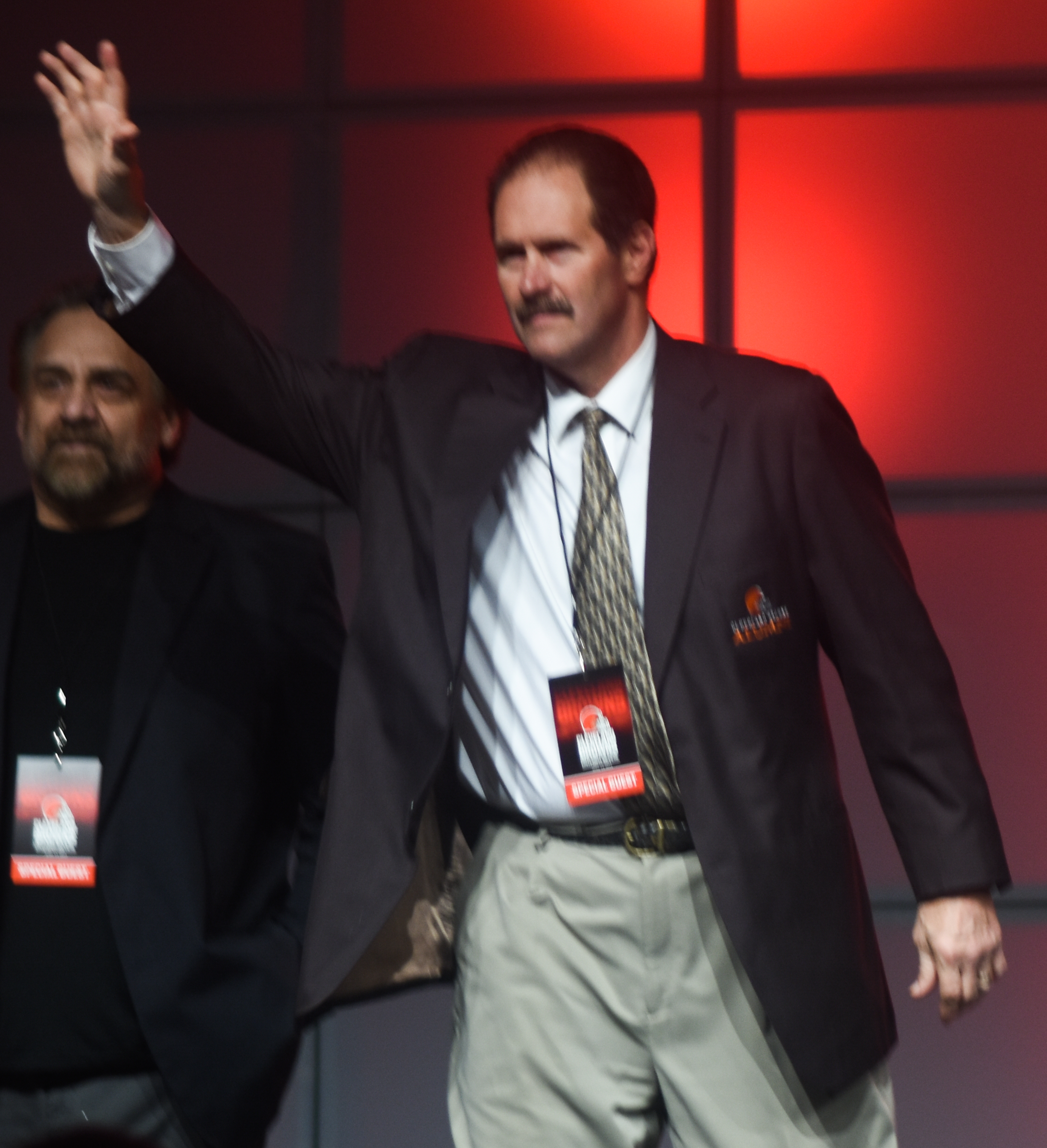
- Fike in 2015

No. 73, 69, 71
- Positions: Guard, tackle

Personal information
- Born: June 16, 1961 (age 65); Mobile, Alabama, U.S.
- Listed height: 6 ft 7 in (2.01 m)
- Listed weight: 280 lb (127 kg)

Career information
- High school: Pensacola (FL) Pine Forest
- College: Florida
- NFL draft: 1983: 10th round, 274th overall pick

Career history
- New York Jets (1983)*; Tampa Bay Bandits (1984–1985); Cleveland Browns (1985–1992); Green Bay Packers (1993)*; Pittsburgh Steelers (1993)
- * Offseason or practice squad member only

Awards and highlights
- Second-team All-SEC (1982)

Career NFL statistics
- Games played: 115
- Games started: 102
- Fumble recoveries: 1
- Stats at Pro Football Reference

Dan Clement Fike Jr. (born June 16, 1961) is an American former professional football player who was an offensive lineman for 11 seasons in the National Football League (NFL) during the 1980s and 1990s. He played college football for the Florida Gators, and thereafter, he played in the NFL for the New York Jets, the Cleveland Browns and the Pittsburgh Steelers.

== Early life ==
Fike was born in Mobile, Alabama. He played youth football at the Myrtle Grove association. He attended Pine Forest High School in Pensacola, Florida, and played high school football for the Pine Forest Eagles.

== College career ==
Fike accepted an athletic scholarship to attend the University of Florida in Gainesville, Florida, where he played for coach Charley Pell's Gators from 1979 to 1982. While he was an undergraduate, he was a member of Pi Kappa Phi fraternity (Alpha Epsilon chapter). As a freshman, he lived through the worst season in the history of the Florida football program in 1979, when the Gators posted an 0–10–1 record. The following season, Fike was part of one of the biggest one-year turn-arounds in Division I football history, when the 1980 Gators finished 8–4 after defeating the Maryland Terrapins in the Tangerine Bowl. He was a second-team All-Southeastern Conference (SEC) selection following his senior season in 1982.

== Professional career ==
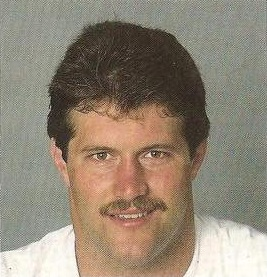
Fike in 1985

After graduating from Florida, Fike was selected in the 1983 USFL Territorial Draft by the Tampa Bay Bandits. The New York Jets selected Fike in the tenth round (274th pick overall) of the 1983 NFL draft. After being cut from the NFL's New York Jets, he signed with the Tampa Bay Bandits on November 13, 1984, and played two seasons as their left tackle starting all 36 regular season games and two playoff from 1984 to 1985. When the USFL ceased operations, Fike signed with the NFL Cleveland Browns. His coach while with the Bandits was Steve Spurrier.

He signed with the Cleveland Browns in 1985, and earned a position as a regular starter, playing at different times at offensive guard and offensive tackle, from 1985 to 1992. Fike arrived in Cleveland at an opportune time when the team was experiencing a competitive revival, and was a starter for five consecutive Browns playoff teams (1985–1989), including appearances in the three AFC Championship Games (1987, 1988, 1990).

Fike played his final NFL season for the Pittsburgh Steelers in 1993, seeing only limited action in three games. In his nine-season professional football career, he appeared in 141 games and started 138 of them.

== See also ==
- Florida Gators football, 1980–89
- List of Florida Gators in the NFL draft
- List of New York Jets players
- List of Pi Kappa Phi alumni
- List of Pittsburgh Steelers players
- List of University of Florida alumni
