= List of Pi Kappa Phi members =

Pi Kappa Phi is a college fraternity that was founded in 1904 at the College of Charleston in Charleston, South Carolina. The following is a list of some of the notable Pi Kappa Phi initiates.

== Academia ==
Name	Chapter	Notability	Ref.
Rhett Brown	Eta Mu	President of Wingate University	
George C. Griffin	Iota	Dean of students at Georgia Tech	
Dean Ho	Eta Sigma	Provost's Chair Professor in the Departments of Biomedical Engineering and Pharmacology and head of the Department of Biomedical Engineering at the National University of Singapore	
Brooks A. Keel	Gamma Psi	President of Augusta University	
M. Dale Kinkade	Alpha Delta	Distinguished professor of linguistics at the University of British Columbia	
Jonathan Koh	Omicron	President of Shelton State Community College	
William Kouwenhoven	Alpha Xi	Dean of Johns Hopkins University and inventor of the heart defibrillator	
John Barkley Means	Upsilon	Professor of liberal arts at Temple University from 1968 to 2003	
Kenneth P. Ruscio	Rho	President of Washington and Lee University	
Phillip M. Summers	Alpha Psi	President of Vicennes University	

== Business ==
Name	Chapter	Notability	Ref.
Joe Forehand	Alpha Iota	Former chairman and CEO of Accenture	
Timothy E. McGuire	Member-at-large	President and CEO of the National Merit Scholarship Corporation	
Gary Parr	Kappa	Banker, Senior Managing Director of Apollo Global Management	
Lonnie Poole Jr.	Tau	CEO of Waste Management Systems	
Brad Singer	Beta Upsilon	CFO of Warner Bros. Discovery and Discovery, Inc.	
Jack Wayman	Epsilon	President and CEO of the Consumer Electronics Association	

== Entertainment ==
Name	Chapter	Notability	Ref.
Adrian Cronauer	Eta Epsilon	Disc jockey on American Forces Network during the Vietnam War who inspired the 1987 film Good Morning, Vietnam	
Rich Eisen	Alpha Kappa	Lead host of the NFL Network and former ESPN anchor	
George Fisher		Lead singer Cannibal Corpse	
David Goodnow	Alpha Psi	Former CNN Headline News anchor	
Randy Owen	Delta Epsilon	Lead singer of Alabama	
Trevor Penick	Zeta Rho	Former member of pop group O-Town	
Ryan Crow	Eta Sigma	Reality television producer/director.	
Nick Palance	Beta Alpha	Opera singer	
Stavros Halkias	Eta Phi	Stand-up comedian; former co-host of the podcast Cum Town	
Jim Samples	Beta	Senior vice president of TNT Latin America and Cartoon Network Latin America, general manager of Cartoon Network, and president of HGTV	
Rick Sanchez	Theta Delta	Radio host and lead anchor with WSVN-TV and Univision Radio, formerly of CNN	
Jimmy Tatro	Beta Theta	Actor and YouTube star	

== Law ==
Name	Chapter	Notability	Ref.
Charles Eaton	Omicron	Judge of the Georgia Superior Court and chairman of the Georgia Public Service Commission	
Dan K. Moore	Kappa	Justice of the North Carolina Superior Court and North Carolina Supreme Court	
Ben Overton	Alpha Epsilon	Chief Justice of the Florida Supreme Court	
Wayne Stenehjem	Zeta Gamma	North Dakota Attorney General	
Alan C. Sundberg	Beta Eta	Justice of the Florida Supreme Court	
James Clinton Turk	Xi	Chief judge of the United States District Court for the Western District of Virginia	

== Literature and journalism ==
Name	Chapter	Notability	Ref.
Malcolm Johnson	Alpha Alpha	Pulitzer Prize winningInvestigative journalist	
Richard Viguerie	Beta Nu	Conservative political analyst and author	
Thomas Wolfe	Kappa	Novelist known for Look Homeward, Angel (1929)	

== Military ==
Name	Chapter	Notability	Ref.
Len Anderson IV	Alpha Phi	United States Marine Corps lieutenant general	
Thomas L. Carter	Gamma Delta	Major General of the United States Air Force and military attaché to President Ronald Reagan	
Rufus G. Herring	Epsilon	Lieutenant Commander with the United States Naval Reserve, recipient of the Medal of Honor	
Héctor Andrés Negroni	Alpha Upsilon	Colonel of the United States Air Force; first Puerto Rican graduate of the United States Air Force Academy	
John J. Yeosock	Alpha Mu	Retired Lieutenant General with the U.S. Army	
Ronald J. Zlatoper	Alpha Tau	Retired Admiral with the U.S. Navy, former commander of the United States Pacific Fleet	

== Politics ==
Name	Chapter	Notability	Ref.
Howard Baker	Alpha Sigma	United States Senate, White House Chief of Staff, U.S. Ambassador to Japan	
Toby Barker	Theta Alpha	Mayor of Hattiesburg, Mississippi House of Representatives	
Phil Bryant	Theta Alpha	Governor of Mississippi, Lieutenant Governor of Mississippi, Mississippi House of Representatives, State Auditor of Mississippi	
Carroll A. Campbell Jr.	Sigma	Governor of South Carolina, United States House of Representatives, South Carolina House of Representatives, South Carolina Senate, president and CEO of American Council of Life Insurers	
Howard Coble	Epsilon Iota	United States House of Representatives, North Carolina Secretary of Revenue	
R. Clarke Cooper	Beta Eta	U.S.Assistant Secretary of State for Political-Military Affairs, U.S. Alternate Representative to the United Nations Security Council	
Phil Crane	Alpha Iota	United States House of Representatives	
James B. Edwards	Alpha	Governor of South Carolina, United States Secretary of Energy, South Carolina Senate; president of the Medical University of South Carolina	
Henry H. Fowler	Xi	United States Secretary of the Treasury	
Lindsey Graham	Alpha (Alumni Initiate)	United States Senate, United States House of Representatives, South Carolina House of Representatives	
George M. Grant	Omicron	United States House of Representatives	
Ben Hill Griffin Jr.	Alpha Epsilon	Florida Senate and Florida House of Representatives	
Syd Herlong	Alpha Epsilon	United States House of Representatives	
Brandt Hershman	Omega	United States House of Representatives, Indiana Senate	
Fritz Hollings	Alpha	United States Senate, Governor of South Carolina, Lieutenant Governor of South Carolina	
Olin D. Johnston	Zeta	Governor of South Carolina, United States Senate, South Carolina House of Representatives	
Hinton Mitchem	Omicron	Alabama Senate	
Dan K. Moore	Kappa	66th Governor of North Carolina, North Carolina House of Representatives	
Ollie Wilson Nabors	Omicron	Alabama Senate	
Gaylord Nelson	Gamma Nu	United States Senate, Governor of Wisconsin, Wisconsin State Senate; founded Earth Day	
Mark Singel	Alpha Mu	Lieutenant Governor of Pennsylvania	
George Bell Timmerman Jr.	Sigma	Governor of South Carolina, Lieutenant Governor of South Carolina	
James E. Rzepkowski	Eta Epsilon	Maryland House of Delegates	
Mac Schneider	Zeta Gamma	North Dakota Senate	
Mark Singel	Alpha Mu	Lieutenant Governor of Pennsylvania, Acting Governor of Pennsylvania	
Wayne Stenehjem	Zeta Gamma	North Dakota Attorney General, North Dakota Senate, North Dakota House of Representatives	
Pat Swindall	Lambda	United States House of Representatives	
George Bell Timmerman Jr.	Sigma	Governor of South Carolina, Lieutenant Governor of South Carolina	
Wayne Waddell	Beta Omicron	Louisiana State Representative	
George Wallace Jr.	Omicron	Alabama State Treasurer, Alabama Public Service Commission	
Michael D. Unes	Epsilon Mu	Illinois House of Representatives	
Don Slesnick	Beta Upsilon	Mayor of Coral Gables, Florida	

== Religion ==
Name	Chapter	Notability	Ref.
Keith Ackerman	Delta Psi	Eighth Bishop of the Episcopal Diocese of Quincy	

== Science ==
Name	Chapter	Notability	Ref.
Roger K. Crouch	Gamma Beta	NASA astronaut with the Space Shuttle Columbia	
Ed Lu	Psi	Astronaut	
Russell C. Newhouse	Alpha Nu	Director of the Radar Laboratory for Bell Telephone Laboratories; inventor of military anti-missile radar systems	
Charles H. Townes	Delta	Nobel Prize-winning physicist	

== Sports ==
Name	Chapter	Notability	Ref.
Matt Arroyo	Beta Lambda	Professional mixed martial artist	
Evan Austin	Eta Beta	2-time Paralympic swimming medalist (1 gold, 1 bronze)	
Fred Beretta	Omega	All-American basketball player with Purdue University.	
Pete Brewster	Omega	Professional football player	
Sean Burch	Xi	Mountaineer and adventure athlete	
Elmer Burnham	Omega	Head football coach at Purdue University and the University of Rochester	
Wally Butts	Alpha Alpha	Former head football coach of the University of Georgia Bulldogs	
Robert Graziano	Delta Rho	Former president and CEO of the Los Angeles Dodgers	
Jim Edmonds	Zeta Rho	Professional baseball player with the San Diego Padres, Chicago Cubs, Milwaukee Brewers, and Cincinnati Reds	
Tommy Lasorda	Member-at-large	Baseball Hall of Fame, Olympic gold medal-winning coach, manager of the Los Angeles Dodgers	
Chris Moneymaker	Alpha Sigma	2003 Winner of the World Series of Poker, professional poker player	
Pat Rummerfield	Theta Iota	Ironman Triathlon athlete; the world's first fully recovered quadriplegic	
Gene Selawski	Omega	Professional football player with the LA Rams, Cleveland Browns, and San Diego Chargers	
Joe Sewell	Omicron	Baseball Hall of Fame inductee, professional baseball player	

== See also ==
- List of Pi Kappa Phi chapters
