= List of North American social fraternities by undergraduate membership =

This is a list of North American social fraternities by undergraduate membership. Membership figures are based on the most recent statistics published by each fraternity through official annual reports, fact books, or official statistics pages.

== List ==
Rank	Fraternity	Undergraduate members	Year	Ref.
1	Kappa Sigma (ΚΣ)	16,000+	2025	
2	Pi Kappa Alpha (ΠΚΑ)	15,000+	2025	
3	Sigma Chi (ΣΧ)	15,000+	2025	
4	Sigma Alpha Epsilon (ΣΑΕ)	13,900+	2025	
5	Pi Kappa Phi (ΠΚΦ)	12,352	2025	
6	Sigma Phi Epsilon (ΣΦΕ)	11,936	2025	
7	Phi Delta Theta (ΦΔΘ)	11,321	2025	
8	Tau Kappa Epsilon (ΤΚΕ)	10,000+	2025	
9	Sigma Nu (ΣΝ)	9,000+	2025	
10	Beta Theta Pi (ΒΘΠ)	8,000+	2025	

== See also ==
- List of North American fraternities by active chapters
- List of North American fraternities by assets
- North American Interfraternity Conference
- List of social fraternities and sororities

== Notes ==
Membership figures represent active undergraduate collegiate members as reported by each fraternity. Because organizations publish membership statistics at different times and use different reporting periods, the figures may not reflect the same academic year.
