= Palance =

Palance is a surname. Notable people with the surname include:

- Holly Palance (born 1950), American actress and journalist
- Jack Palance (1919–2006), American actor of Ukrainian descent
- Michael Palance (born 1970), American actor and producer
- Nick Palance, American singer, musician, songwriter, and actor
