= Syd Herlong =

American politician

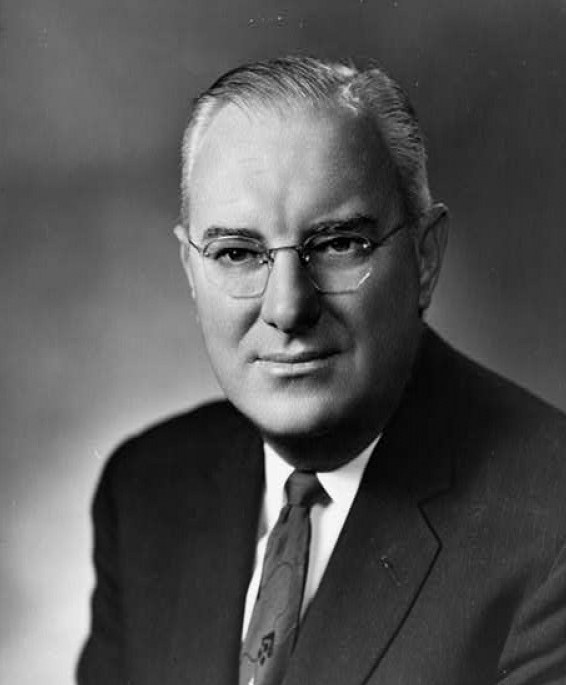

Member of the U.S. House of Representatives from Florida
- In office January 3, 1949 – January 3, 1969
- Preceded by: Joe Hendricks
- Succeeded by: Bill Chappell
- Constituency: 5th district (1949–1967); 4th district (1967–1969)

Personal details
- Born: Albert Sydney Herlong Jr. February 14, 1909 Manistee, Alabama
- Died: December 27, 1995 (aged 86) Leesburg, Florida
- Party: Democratic (1937–1985)
- Other political affiliations: Republican (1985–1995)
- Education: University of Florida

Albert Sydney Herlong Jr. (February 14, 1909 – December 27, 1995) was an American lawyer and politician from Florida who served ten terms in the United States House of Representatives from 1949 to 1969. He was a member of the Democratic Party.

== Early life and education ==
Herlong was born in the small community of Manistee, Alabama in 1909, and moved with his parents to Marion County, Florida in 1912. He attended the public schools of Sumter and Lake counties and graduated from Leesburg High School in Leesburg, Florida. Herlong attended the University of Florida in Gainesville, Florida, where he was a member of Pi Kappa Phi fraternity (Alpha Epsilon Chapter), and graduated in 1930. He was admitted to The Florida Bar in 1930 and started his law practice in Leesburg.

== Career ==
=== Early political career ===
Herlong was elected county judge of Lake County, Florida, and served from 1937 to 1949. He served as city attorney of Leesburg from 1946 to 1948. He held a reserve commission as captain in the U.S. Army and was called to active duty in the Judge Advocate General's Department in August 1941. He was discharged in 1942 due to physical disability. He served two enlistments in the Florida State Guard. He served as president of the Florida State Baseball League in 1947 and 1948.

=== Career in Congress ===
Herlong was elected as a Democrat to the Eighty-first and to the nine succeeding Congresses (January 3, 1949 – January 3, 1969).

In Congress, Herlong was noted for his anti-communist advocacy. In 1959, Herlong introduced a bill to establish a federally funded Freedom Academy that would counter-act foreign countries' Communist propaganda. On January 10, 1963, at the request of constituent Patricia Nordman, Herlong read into the Congressional Record a list of 45 goals of communism from the book The Naked Communist by W. Cleon Skousen.

Herlong was a signatory to the 1956 Southern Manifesto that opposed the desegregation of public schools ordered by the Supreme Court in Brown v. Board of Education. Herlong voted against the Civil Rights Acts of 1957, the Civil Rights Acts of 1960, the Civil Rights Acts of 1964, and the Civil Rights Acts of 1968 as well as the 24th Amendment to the U.S. Constitution and the Voting Rights Act of 1965.

He was not a candidate for reelection in 1968 to the Ninety-first Congress. He supported Nixon’s campaign for president in 1968.

=== Post-Congressional career ===
He resumed his practice of law. Appointed in 1969 by President Richard Nixon, Herlong served in the Securities and Exchange Commission until 1973.

In 1985, Herlong formally changed his party affiliation to Republican.

== Personal life ==
In 1967, while Herlong was still a Congressman, his portrait was painted by renowned portraitist Everett Raymond Kinstler.

Herlong died December 27, 1995, at his home in Leesburg, Florida. He was married and had four daughters, Sydney, Dorothy, Mary Alice, and Margaret.

== See also ==
- List of Pi Kappa Phi alumni
- List of Levin College of Law graduates
- List of University of Florida alumni

U.S. House of Representatives
Preceded by Joe Hendricks	Member of the U.S. House of Representatives from Florida's 5th congressional district January 3, 1949 – January 3, 1967	Succeeded by Edward Gurney
Preceded by Dante Fascell	Member of the U.S. House of Representatives from Florida's 4th congressional district January 3, 1967 – January 3, 1969	Succeeded by Bill Chappell
