= Sox Appeal =

- Genre: Reality TV
- Created by: Ges Selmont
- Directed by: Ryan Crow
- Narrated by: Jimmy Dunn
- Theme music composer: Chris Trapper; Brad Young; Dow Brain
- Opening theme: "Long, Hot Summer"
- Ending theme: "Sox Appeal"
- Composers: Dow Brain; Brad Young
- Country of origin: United States
- Original language: English
- No. of seasons: 2
- No. of episodes: 10

Production
- Executive producers: Eric Korsh; David Collins; Michael Williams; Joel Feld
- Producers: Cassandra Corbett; Desiree Gonzalez; Kristin McFarland; Len Mead (consulting)
- Production location: Fenway Park
- Editors: Macaela VanderMost; Reinita Susman; Scott Fisher

Original release
- Network: NESN
- Release: August 1, 2007 – 2008

Sox Appeal is a reality television series that aired on NESN in 2007 and 2008. It was a Boston Red Sox-themed dating game show that followed a fan during three, two-inning long blind dates that took place over the course of a Red Sox game. During the seventh inning stretch, the fan chose the date they wanted to continue dating. The date, however, could choose not to continue the date.

The series was a collaboration between NESN and Scout Productions, producers of Queer Eye for the Straight Guy. The music was composed by Dow Brain and Brad Young of Underground Productions, Inc.

The series premiere featured Garrett Lucash, a former national champion pairs skater.

The second season premiered on August 3, 2008. For the second season, former New England Patriots player Larry Izzo was added as the host of a post-date interview segment. Also, a "Daters' Dugout" was added in the second season, where the competing daters must stand next to each other during the game in Fenway Park's right field roof deck standing room section to strategize and challenge each other.
