= Alico, Inc. =

American holding company

Alico Inc.
- Type: Public
- Traded as: Nasdaq: ALCO
- Industry: Investments; Agriculture; Environmental services
- Headquarters: Fort Myers, Florida, US
- Area served: North America
- Key people: Ben Fishman (interim president & chairman); John Kiernan (CEO); James Sampel – CIO; Richard Rallo (CFO); Danny Sutton (president & GM of Alico Citrus); Chris Moore (VP of Alico Logistics)
- Products: Citrus; Land; Water resources
- Website: alicoinc.com (corporate); alicowaterresources.com; alicocitrus.com

Alico, Inc. is a holding company which owns Alico Citrus, one of the nation's largest citrus producers, and Alico Water Resources, a leading water storage and environmental services company. Alico, Inc. also owns major land holdings in Florida. In January 2024 Alico announced their intention to discontinue citrus crop operations due to citrus greening disease and weather damage. They intend to keep 75% of their land in agriculture through leasing to other agricultural operators.

== History ==
In 1898, the Atlantic Land and Improvement Company was founded as a subsidiary of the Atlantic Coast Line Railroad and was the holding company for its real estate division. In February 1960, the Atlantic Coast Line Railroad (which later became part of CSX Transportation) spun-off the Atlantic Land and Improvement Company into the Alico Land Development Company, which was then renamed Alico in 1974. Alico is an acronym for Atlantic Land and Improvement Company.

In 1961, Ben Hill Griffin, Jr. was named to the board of directors of Alico, Inc, which then became a publicly traded corporation engaged in citrus fruit, sugarcane, and sod production, cattle ranching and forestry. Griffin acquired a majority of the outstanding stock of Alico in 1972, and became chairman of its board of directors in 1973.

Griffin, Jr. died in 1990 and was succeeded by his son Ben Hill Griffin III. Griffin III went on to donate 760 acres of the company's land in South Fort Myers to the state for the construction of Florida Gulf Coast University. The road leading to the university and one of its academic halls are named for Griffin, and its basketball arena is named Alico Arena.

Alico is an agribusiness in citrus, conservation, and rural-based commodities.

In 2014, Alico purchased three Florida citrus producers, making Alico one of the United States' largest citrus producers. The $363 million deal added 28,000 acres of citrus groves to Alico's portfolio.

Alico sold 5,534 acres of property to the State of Florida under the Florida Forever program in 2019, furthering the state's Devils Garden conservation project. Florida's Secretary of the Department of Environmental Protection noted the land sale would protect water resources and wildlife, including the Florida panther, and that in addition to the land being managed well, it has been preserved by Alico in "as close to a historic state as possible." In May 2020, the State of Florida entered into an option agreement to purchase another 10,684 acres of Alico property for the Florida Forever program. The land sale was praised by numerous environmental organizations for providing important protections for sensitive lands, water, and wildlife habitats for the Florida panther.

The company posted $4.4 million in profits for the first half of the 2020 Fiscal Year and harvested 5.61 million boxes of citrus. Alico also purchased its first grove in five years, acquiring 334 acres in Polk County. The company said "The coronavirus (COVID-19) outbreak has had minimal impact on the company's harvest and business operations."

== Alico Citrus ==
Alico Citrus is an American citrus producer, with over 8.1 million boxes of citrus in the 2018–19 season. The company is a wholly owned subsidiary of Alico, Inc. The company owns and manages citrus groves in seven Florida counties - Collier, Charlotte, DeSoto, Hendry, Hardee, Highlands, and Polk Counties and engages in the cultivation of citrus trees to produce citrus for delivery to the fresh and processed citrus markets. Alico Citrus totaled approximately 45,000 gross acres at September 30, 2019.

Alico reported a 68% increase in citrus production for the 2019 Fiscal Year compared to the year prior. The company also planted 400,000 new trees in both FY 2018 and 2019.

In January 2024, Alico received funding supporting the use of Oxytetracycline to address the effects of citrus greening from the Citrus Research and Field Trial Foundation. Over 35% of producing trees have been treated with the antibiotic via trunk injection.

Alico Citrus division cultivates citrus trees to produce citrus for delivery to the processed and fresh citrus markets. Its sales to the processed market constitute approximately 97% of the company's citrus sales annually. Alico Citrus produces Early and Mid-Season varieties, primarily Hamlin oranges, as well as a Valencia variety for the processed market.

Alico Citrus’ sales to the fresh market constitute approximately 3% of its citrus sales annually. The company produces numerous varieties to the fresh fruit market including grapefruit, navel and other fresh varieties. Generally, Alico's fresh fruit is sold to packing houses by the box, and the packing houses are responsible for the harvest and haul of these boxes.

Alico also engages in complementary activities including contracting for harvesting, hauling and marketing and the purchase and resale of fruit. In January 2024 Alico announced their intention to discontinue citrus crop operations due to greening disease and weather damage. They intend to keep 75% of their land in agriculture through leasing to other agricultural operators.

== Alico Water Resources ==
Alico Water Resources is an environmental services company and wholly owned subsidiary of Alico, Inc. Alico Water Resources has worked to permit a 35,000-acre Hendry County property for a dispersed water storage project, the largest and most cost-effective project of its kind in Florida. With the May 2020 sale of 10,684 acres to the Florida Forever Program, the permitting process for the water project has been suspended.

The water project would store large volumes of excess water from the Caloosahatchee River and prevents local runoff from entering the estuary. The project also rehydrates natural systems that eventually flow south into the Everglades and preserves ranch and farmland from future development and urban sprawl. Taxpayers benefit as Alico Water Resources' project is five times as cost-effective as other public projects and land remains in tax base of the local community.

The project is one of several currently in the permitting process for the Southwest Florida region, but it represents the most substantial share of water storage and treatment of all the proposed projects.

The project has the estimated ability to store and treat 92,000 acre-feet of water annually, or 30 billion gallons.

== Community impact ==
In 1992, Alico donated 760 acres of land for the construction of Florida Gulf Coast University (FGCU). FGCU's campus arena opened in 2002 and is called Alico Arena.
