= List of North American fraternities by assets =

This is a list of North American social fraternities by total assets. The figures are based on publicly available IRS Form 990 filings listed through ProPublica Nonprofit Explorer. For fraternities with more than one national tax-exempt entity, totals may include the national fraternity, educational foundation, property corporation, endowment fund, or national philanthropy.

== List ==
Rank	Fraternity	Total assets	Fiscal year	Assets included	Ref.
1	Sigma Phi Epsilon (ΣΦΕ)	US$117,500,000	2025	National fraternity and educational foundation	
2	Pi Kappa Phi (ΠΚΦ)	US$77,920,000	2025	National office, foundation, properties corporation, and The Ability Experience	
3	Sigma Chi (ΣΧ)	US$62,800,000	2025	National fraternity and foundation	
4	Phi Gamma Delta (ΦΓΔ)	US$50,500,000	2024	National fraternity and educational foundation	
5	Phi Delta Theta (ΦΔΘ)	US$41,700,000	2024	Foundation	
6	Pi Kappa Alpha (ΠΚΑ)	US$39,600,000	2025	Foundation	
7	Beta Theta Pi (ΒΘΠ)	US$39,200,000	2024	Foundation	
8	Sigma Nu (ΣΝ)	US$39,000,000	2025	National fraternity and foundation	
9	Kappa Sigma (ΚΣ)	US$31,200,000	2024	National fraternity and endowment fund	
10	Alpha Tau Omega (ΑΤΩ)	US$29,400,000	2025	National fraternity and foundation	
11	Delta Tau Delta (ΔΤΔ)	US$29,300,000	2024	Foundation	
12	Theta Chi (ΘΧ)	US$22,010,000	2025	National fraternity and foundation chapter	
13	Tau Kappa Epsilon (ΤΚΕ)	US$7,500,000	2024	National fraternity	

== See also ==
- North American Interfraternity Conference
- List of social fraternities and sororities
- Fraternities and sororities

== Notes ==
Totals are based on the asset values reported in the most recent available IRS Form 990 filings. Local chapter housing corporations and independently incorporated alumni associations are not included. Because fraternities organize their national entities differently, the assets included vary by organization.
