= Loucheiz Purifoy =

American gridiron football player (born 1992)

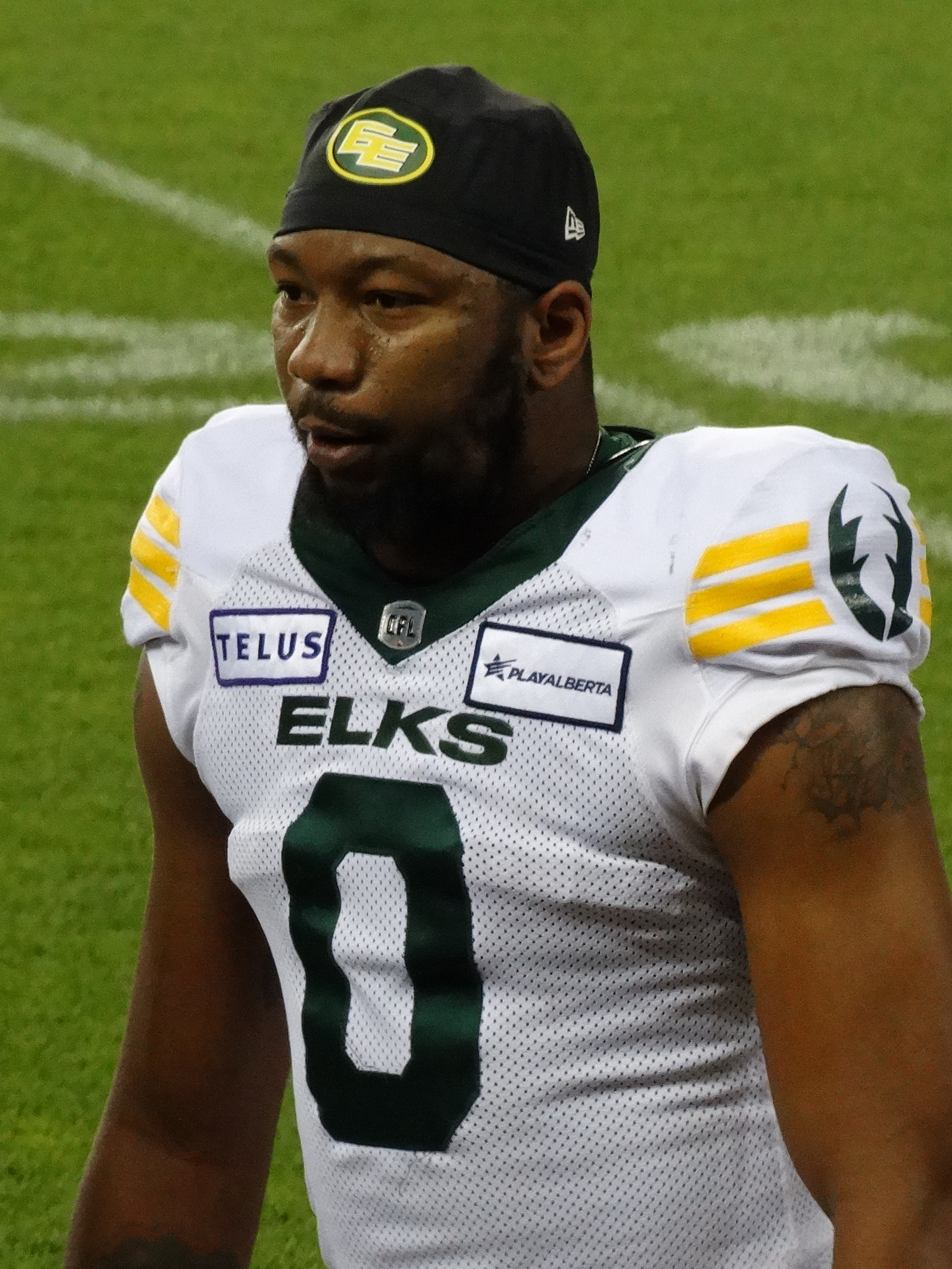
- Purifoy with the Edmonton Elks in 2023

Profile
- Position: Defensive back

Personal information
- Born: December 16, 1992 (age 33); Cantonment, Florida, U.S.
- Listed height: 5 ft 11 in (1.80 m)
- Listed weight: 190 lb (86 kg)

Career information
- High school: Pine Forest (Pensacola, Florida)
- College: Florida
- NFL draft: 2014: undrafted

Career history
- Indianapolis Colts (2014); Seattle Seahawks (2014); BC Lions (2016–2017); Ottawa Redblacks (2018); Saskatchewan Roughriders (2018–2021); BC Lions (2022); Edmonton Elks (2023–2024)

Awards and highlights
- CFL All-Star (2022); 2× CFL West All-Star (2022, 2024); Second-team All-SEC (2013)

Career NFL statistics
- Total tackles: 7
- Forced fumbles: 1
- Pass deflections: 1
- Stats at Pro Football Reference
- Stats at CFL.ca

Loucheiz Purifoy (born December 16, 1992) is an American professional football defensive back. Purifoy played college football for the University of Florida. He signed with the Indianapolis Colts as an undrafted free agent after the 2014 NFL draft, and has also been a member of the Seattle Seahawks, BC Lions, Ottawa Redblacks, Saskatchewan Roughriders, and Edmonton Elks.

== Early life ==
Purifoy was born in Pensacola, Florida. He attended Pine Forest High School in Pensacola, where he played high school football. He played quarterback, running back and wide receiver in the Eagles' split-back veer offense. He was also a long jumper and sprinter for the Pine Forest track team. Purifoy was a standout in the long jump and triple jump, posting personal marks of 7.21 meters and 14.68 meters, respectively. In addition, he competed in the 200 meters, recording a personal best of 22.08 seconds.

== College career ==
Purifoy accepted an athletic scholarship to attend the University of Florida, where he played for coach Will Muschamp's Florida Gators football team from 2011 to 2013. As a true freshman in 2011, he played in all thirteen games as a reserve cornerback and on special teams. As a sophomore in 2012, he started twelve of thirteen games, recording 51 tackles. As a junior in 2013, he started seven of eleven games, recording 24 tackles, two interceptions and two quarterback sacks.

On November 30, 2013, Purifoy announced that he would forgo his senior season and enter the 2014 NFL draft.

== Professional career ==
Pre-draft measurables
Height	Weight	Arm length	Hand span
5 ft 11 in (1.80 m)	190 lb (86 kg)	32 3/4 in (0.83 m)	8 1/2 in (0.22 m)
All values from NFL Combine

=== Indianapolis Colts ===
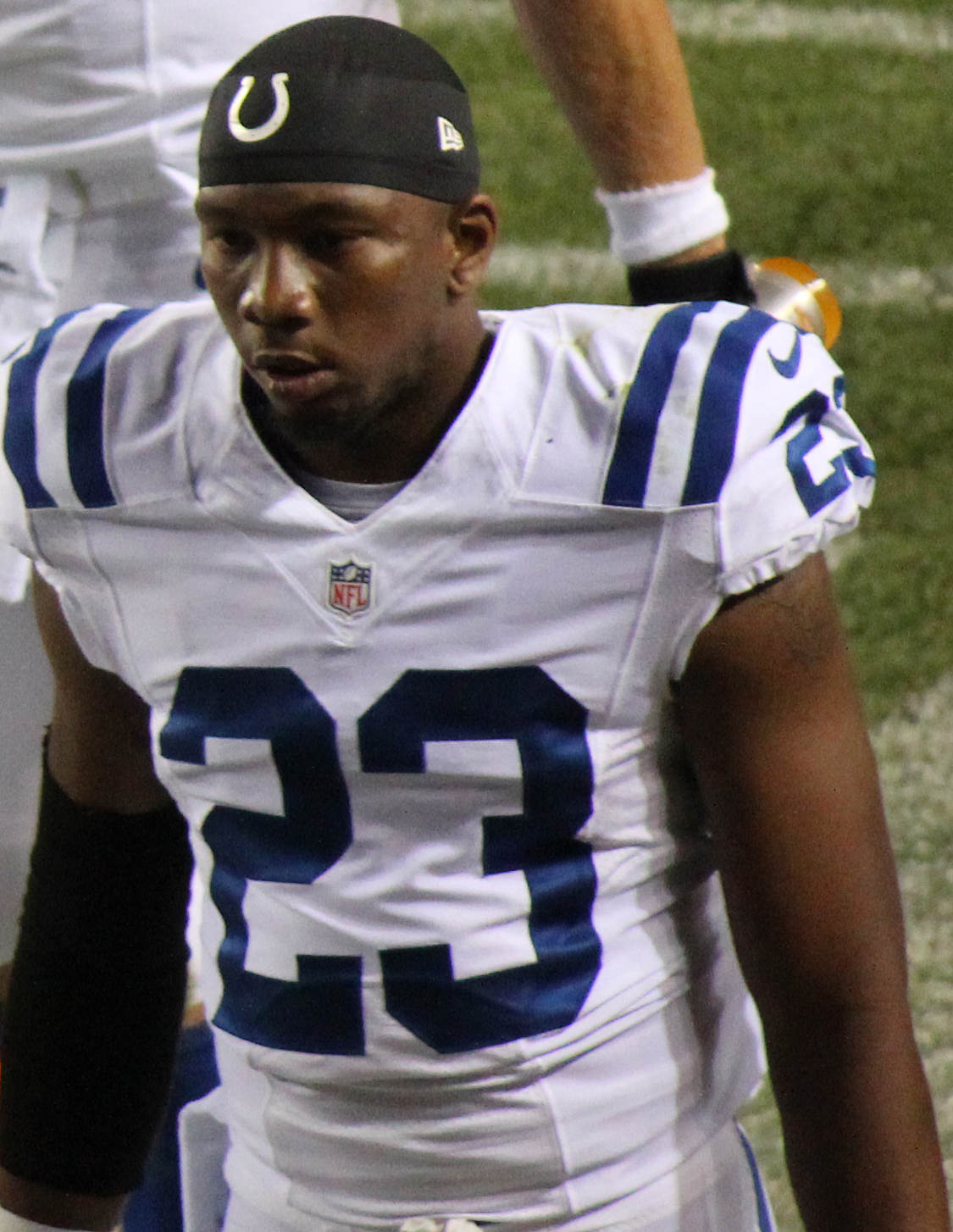
Purifoy with the Indianapolis Colts in 2014

Purifoy's problems off the field may have contributed to a slip from a late draft pick to an undrafted free agent. On May 12, 2014, it was announced that the Indianapolis Colts agreed to terms with Purifoy. Purifoy went into the preseason with a competition with fellow cornerback Marcus Burley. Both performed well and cutting either would be difficult, so the Colts traded Burley to the Seattle Seahawks for a sixth round draft pick. The Colts kept Purifoy and was on their initial 53-man roster. Purifoy dressed for 11 games during the 2014 season, seeing his snap count increase over the course of the year. He was waived on November 27.

=== Seattle Seahawks ===
Purifoy was claimed off waivers by the Seattle Seahawks on November 28, 2014, but was waived after a failed physical on December 1, 2014. Whilst a free agent, Purifoy was suspended by the NFL for the first ten weeks of the 2015 season, most likely for violating the substance abuse policy.

=== BC Lions (first stint) ===
On March 21, 2016, Purifoy signed a contract with the BC Lions of the Canadian Football League. According to Lions head coach Wally Buono, Purifoy had a very impressive first season in the CFL. He was, however, deemed ineligible for rookie of the year consideration based on the fact that he had dressed for an NFL regular season game in the past. Purifoy had a strong second season with the Lions in 2017, amassing 49 defensive tackles, three special teams tackles and three interceptions. Following the 2017 season, Purifoy was not re-signed by the Lions and became a free agent.

=== Ottawa Redblacks ===
On the first day of free agency, February 13, 2018, Purifoy was signed to a one-year contract by the Ottawa Redblacks. He played in the Redblacks first seven games of the season and contributed with 29 tackles, one interception and a forced fumble. Purifoy was released by the Redblacks on August 6, 2018.

=== Saskatchewan Roughriders ===
One day after being released by the Redblacks, Purifoy signed with the Saskatchewan Roughriders.

=== BC Lions (second stint) ===
On the first day of free agency, on February 8, 2022, Purifoy signed with the Lions. Purifoy played in all 18 regular season games for the Lions and contributed with 55 tackles, nine special-teams tackles, three interceptions and a sack. He was named a CFL All-Star for his performance. He was released on January 4, 2023. He was due a $30,000 roster bonus in mid-February 2023.

=== Edmonton Elks ===
On January 9, 2023, it was announced that Purifoy had signed with the Edmonton Elks. He was released in January 2025.

On January 17, 2025, hours after being released by the Elks, the CFL announced that he would be suspended 2 games for violating the leagues substance abuse policy, a decision that the CFLPA protested immensely.
