= Larry Izzo =

American football player and coach (born 1974)

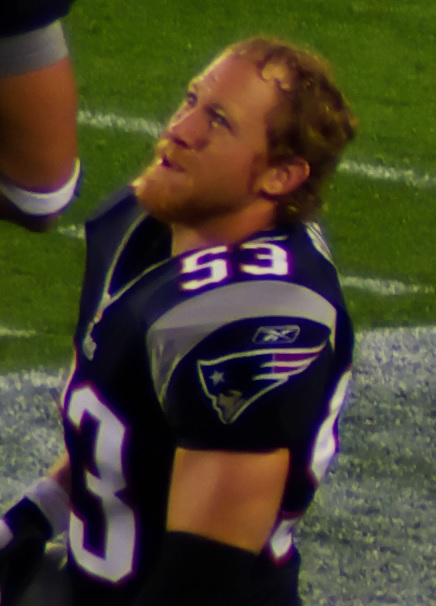
- Izzo with the New England Patriots in 2007

Washington Commanders
- Title: Special teams coordinator

Personal information
- Born: September 26, 1974 (age 52); Fort Belvoir, Virginia, U.S.
- Listed height: 5 ft 10 in (1.78 m)
- Listed weight: 225 lb (102 kg)

Career information
- Positions: Linebacker, special teamer (No. 53)
- High school: McCullough (The Woodlands, Texas)
- College: Rice (1992–1995)
- NFL draft: 1996: undrafted

Career history

Playing
- Miami Dolphins (1996–2000); New England Patriots (2001–2008); New York Jets (2009)

Coaching
- New York Giants (2011–2015) Assistant special teams coordinator; Houston Texans (2016–2017) Special teams coordinator; Seattle Seahawks (2018–2023); Assistant special teams coordinator (2018–2020); Interim special teams coordinator (2020); Special teams coordinator (2021–2023); Washington Commanders (2024–present) Special teams coordinator

Awards and highlights
- As a player: 3× Super Bowl champion (XXXVI, XXXVIII, XXXIX); New England Patriots All-Dynasty Team; First-team All-Pro (2004); 3× Pro Bowl (2000, 2002, 2004); PFWA All-Rookie Team (1996); Second-team All-SWC (1995); As a coach: Super Bowl champion (XLVI)
- Stats at Pro Football Reference

Lawrence Alexander Izzo (/ˈɪzoʊ/; born September 26, 1974) is an American professional football coach and former linebacker who is the special teams coordinator for the Washington Commanders of the National Football League (NFL). He played college football for the Rice Owls and was signed as an undrafted free agent by the Miami Dolphins in 1996. A three-time Pro Bowl selection and All-Pro selection for the New England Patriots as a special teamer, he won three Super Bowls with the Patriots and one as a coach with the New York Giants.

== Early life ==
Izzo attended Broad Run High School in Ashburn, Virginia. As a sophomore, he started as a linebacker and running back, becoming the first sophomore in school history to lead the team in rushing yards and TDs. When his family relocated to Texas, he attended McCullough High School in The Woodlands, Texas, and won two varsity letters in football where he was coached by Weldon Willig as a running back/safety, as well as baseball. During his senior year, Izzo led McCullough with 1,081 yards rushing, while totaling 131 tackles for the Texas 5A semi-finalists. He was selected as the Houston Chronicle's Two-Way Player of the Year, and was a finalist for the Houston Touchdown Club's Player of the Year.

== College career ==
Izzo attended Rice University, where he wore the number 26, and was a four-year letterman and standout and finished fourth on the school's all-time tackles list with 301 tackles, setting a school-record 46 tackles for losses, and a season record of 18 tackles for losses in 1995.

In 1994 an underdog Rice beat top 10 ranked Texas on national television by the score of 19–17, as Izzo was selected player of the game with two key sacks (sharing the honor with teammate N. D. Kalu). It was the first time in over 30 years that Rice had beaten its in-state rival, and would help Rice win a share of the Southwest Conference title for the first time in 37 years.

As a senior, Izzo was voted defensive team captain and earned consensus All-Southwest Conference honors after registering 121 tackles, he won the George Martin Award as the team's MVP and won the Jess Neely Defense Award as the team's top linebacker. Izzo was also selected as an Honorable Mention All-America.

== Professional career ==
=== Miami Dolphins ===
Izzo went undrafted in the 1996 NFL draft and was later signed by the Miami Dolphins as a free agent in April 1996. He first came to local notoriety based on a sound byte that circulated during the pre-season of Izzo's rookie year, where Miami coach Jimmy Johnson told the team that only two players were guaranteed to make the team: one was Dan Marino and the other the then-unknown Izzo. He spent most of his time on special teams, and was rewarded with his first trip to the Pro Bowl in 2000.

=== New England Patriots ===
Izzo signed with Miami's divisional rival New England Patriots in 2001, and played on three of the six Patriots' Super Bowl championship teams (2001, 2003 and 2004), defeating the St. Louis Rams, Carolina Panthers, and Philadelphia Eagles, respectively. Izzo was also part of the 2007 Patriots, who were the only undefeated team in the regular season since the NFL expanded to a 16-game schedule; they lost Super Bowl XLII, 17–14, to the New York Giants. He also had two more trips to Hawaii as the AFC special team representative in 2002, and 2004. Izzo gained notoriety in 2002 in the Patriots Super Bowl parade by leading the crowd in a "Yankees suck!" chant, in reference to the Red Sox–Yankees rivalry.

=== New York Jets ===
Izzo joined his third AFC East team, the New York Jets on March 11, 2009. On December 10, 2009, the Jets placed Izzo on IR after tests revealed a spine injury.

== Coaching career ==
=== New York Giants (2011–2015) ===
On June 24, 2011, Izzo joined the New York Giants as assistant special teams coach. Izzo was credited with helping turn around the Giants special teams during their Super Bowl run in 2011–12. In the pivotal 2011-12 NFC Championship game, the Giant's special teams changed the momentum of the game when rookie linebacker Jacquian Williams caused a fumble on a punt return to set up Lawrence Tynes' game-winning field goal in overtime against the 49ers. The Giants went on to win the Super Bowl, and Izzo received his fourth Super Bowl ring.

=== Houston Texans (2016–2017) ===
On January 15, 2016, the Houston Texans hired Izzo as special teams coordinator. During Izzo's tenure with Houston the Special Teams unit improved its DVOA ranking from dead last (ranked 32 in 2015) to 26 in 2017, including finishing in the top 10 in two critical statistical areas related to coverage teams (Opponent Kickoff Return Average and Net Punt Average, which was 41.3 yds).

On January 2, 2018, Texans reached a mutual parting of the ways with Izzo.

=== Seattle Seahawks (2018–2023) ===
On February 1, 2018, the Seattle Seahawks hired Izzo as assistant special teams coach.

On September 11, 2020, Izzo became the interim special teams coordinator for the Seahawks after their coordinator Brian Schneider left the team indefinitely for personal reasons; Izzo subsequently led the Seahawks into the top 3 for Special Teams DVOA rankings. He was promoted to full-time special teams coordinator on March 3, 2021.

=== Washington Commanders (2024–present) ===
In February 2024, Izzo was hired by the Washington Commanders as their special teams coordinator under new head coach Dan Quinn.

== Personal life ==
Izzo and his wife Mara married on February 21, 2004. Izzo has two children, Boston and Hawk. In 2008, he hosted an interview segment on the NESN dating show Sox Appeal.

In 2005, Izzo and Warrick Dunn took part in an NFL sponsored USO tour to visit troops stationed overseas, beginning their trip at Bagram Air Base in Afghanistan, where they helped open the Pat Tillman USO Center, then visiting troops in Baghdad, Kuwait and Qatar. Visited injured military personnel at Walter Reed Army Medical Center in Washington, D.C. in 2004 and 2005.

In 2008, Izzo was awarded the New England Patriots Ron Burton Community Service Award by owner Robert Kraft for his strong commitment to community service and leadership. Izzo was one of the team's most active community participants, raising over $600,000 for veteran's causes with his annual "Larryoke" Salute to the Troops.
