= Manistee, Alabama =

- Unincorporated community
- Location within Alabama Location within the United States
- Coordinates: 31°26′28″N 87°29′40″W
- Country: United States
- State: Alabama
- County: Monroe
- Elevation: 167 ft (51 m)
- Time zone: UTC-6 (Central (CST))
  - Summer (DST): UTC-5 (CDT)
- Area code: 251
- GNIS feature ID: 156652

Manistee is an unincorporated community in Monroe County, Alabama, United States. Manistee was a logging town, and was home to the Manistee Mill Company, Bear Creek Mill Company and Runyan-Burgoyne Lumber Company. The Manistee Mill Company built a spur track to connect the sawmills of Manistee with the Louisville & Nashville Railroad in Repton and named it the Manistee & Repton Railway. The railway began operations in 1907 and remained in use until the 1970s, operating over 45 miles (72 km) of track. Amasa Coleman Lee, father of Harper Lee, served as financial manager for a Monroeville law firm's interests in the Manistee & Repton Railway. A post office was operated in Manistee from 1892 to 1912.

== Notable person ==
- Syd Herlong, a U.S. Representative from Florida from 1949 to 1967.
