= List of North American fraternities by active chapters =

This is a list of North American social fraternities by active collegiate chapters. The list uses the most recent chapter counts published by each fraternity or listed in the University of Illinois Fraternity and Sorority Almanac.

== List ==
Rank	Fraternity	Active chapters	Year	Ref.
1	Kappa Sigma (ΚΣ)	286	2025	
2	Sigma Chi (ΣΧ)	235	2025	
3	Sigma Alpha Epsilon (ΣΑΕ)	214	2025	
4	Tau Kappa Epsilon (ΤΚΕ)	213	2025	
5	Pi Kappa Alpha (ΠΚΑ)	205	2025	
6	Phi Delta Theta (ΦΔΘ)	195	2025	
7	Sigma Phi Epsilon (ΣΦΕ)	188	2025	
8	Pi Kappa Phi (ΠΚΦ)	187	2025	
9	Sigma Nu (ΣΝ)	160	2025	
10	Lambda Chi Alpha (ΛΧΑ)	159	2025	

== See also ==
- North American Interfraternity Conference
- List of social fraternities and sororities
- Fraternities and sororities

== Notes ==
Chapter totals may differ from older published rankings because fraternities update chapter counts at different times. Some organizations include associate or provisional chapters in their published active chapter totals.
