= Pine Forest High School =

Coordinates: 30.4874185°N 87.297196°W

Location
- 2500 Longleaf Drive; Pensacola, Florida 32526; United States

Information
- Type: Public
- Established: 1975
- School district: Escambia County School District
- CEEB code: 101381
- Principal: Melanie McElhaney
- Staff: 80.00 (FTE)
- Grades: 9-12
- Enrollment: 1,737 (2023-2024)
- Student to teacher ratio: 21.71
- Colors: Red, white, blue
- Nickname: Eagles
- Website: Pine Forest High School

Pine Forest High School is a high school in Pensacola, Florida. It was opened in 1975, with the first day of class being 10 November 1975.

Pine Forest High is located on Longleaf Drive in a cluster of education buildings.

== Athletics ==
Pine Forest won the USA Today High School Football National Championship in 1988 (and the Class 5A state championship) after compiling a 13-0 record, becoming the first Florida team to win the award The Eagles also won the 5A state championship in 1987 and the 4A state championship in 2000. Three former Eagles have played in the NFL: Mike Johnson of the Atlanta Falcons, George Selvie of the Dallas Cowboys, 2x Pro Bowl (2013 & 2014) Alfred Morris and active player 2x Pro Bowl Devon Witherspoon (Seahawks).

Pine Forest Women's Track and Field team won back to back Florida 3A State Championships in 2010 and 2011.

The mascot is the eagle, and the colors are red, white, and blue. The fight song is Hoorah for Eagles a rendition of Hooray for Auburn!! The original fight song was a version of Ghost Riders.

=== Fall sports ===
- Cross Country
- Football
- Golf
- Swimming
- Volleyball
- Soccer

=== Winter sports ===
- Men's Basketball
- Women's Basketball
- Women's Weightlifting
- Cheerleading

=== Spring sports ===
- Baseball
- Softball
- Tennis
- Men's Track
- Women's Track
- Men's Weightlifting

== Notable alumni ==
- Daniel Alvarez, former professional soccer midfielder
- Chuck Clanton, former NFL defensive back
- Martin Emerson, current cornerback for the New Orleans Saints
- Dan Fike, former NFL offensive lineman
- Mike Johnson, offensive guard for the Atlanta Falcons
- Donald (Eugene) Kirkland, lieutenant general in the U.S. Air Force
- Mac McWilliams, college football cornerback for the UCF Knights
- Alfred Morris, running back for the Washington Redskins
- Loucheiz Purifoy, cornerback for the University of Florida
- Mitchell Robinson, NBA player
- George Selvie, defensive end for the New York Giants
- Seante Williams, former NFL defensive end
- Devon Witherspoon, current cornerback for the Seattle Seahawks

== See also ==
Escambia County School District
