= Daniel Alvarez (soccer, born 1978) =

American soccer midfielder (born 1978)

Personal information
- Date of birth: January 18, 1978 (age 48)
- Place of birth: Fayetteville, North Carolina, United States
- Height: 6 ft 0 in (1.83 m)
- Position: Midfielder

Youth career
- Years: Team
- 1995–1999: Furman Paladins
2000	Atlanta Silverbacks	3	(0)
2000	Charleston Battery	6	(0)
2002	Cincinnati Riverhawks	14	(2)
2002–2004	Virginia Beach Mariners	57	(3)
2009	Hampton Roads Piranhas	2	(0)

Managerial career
- 2002: Furman University (assistant)
- 2005: Old Dominion University (assistant)

Daniel Alvarez is an American former soccer midfielder.

Alvarez graduated from Pine Forest High School. He attended Furman University, where he was a 1999 First-Team All-American. He graduated with a bachelor's degree in health and exercise science. He was inducted into the Furman Paladins Hall of Fame in 2005.

In January 2000, the MetroStars selected Alvarez in the fourth round (thirty-seventh overall) of the 2000 MLS SuperDraft. He did not sign with the MetroStars, but played three games for the Atlanta Silverbacks at the start of the USL A-League season. On April 19, 2000, the MetroStars traded Alvarez's rights to the Tampa Bay Mutiny in exchange for Daniel Hernández. Alvarez chose to pursue a contract in Germany. After unsuccessful trials with Borussia Dortmund, FC Cloppenburg, and FC Nuremberg, he returned to the United States and signed with the Charleston Battery of the USL A-League. In the spring of 2001, Alvarez was training with the Mutiny when he tore his left anterior cruciate ligament. He returned home to Fayetteville to recuperate. While there, he coached with the Fayetteville Force Soccer Club. In February 2002, the Colorado Rapids selected Alvarez in the third round (twenty-ninth overall) of the 2002 MLS SuperDraft. The Rapids did not sign him and he began the 2002 season with the Cincinnati Riverhawks before finishing it with the Virginia Beach Mariners of the USL First Division. He played for the Mariners through the 2004 season.

In 2005, he became an assistant with the Old Dominion University men's soccer team.

Alvarez has four children. His oldest daughter, Aven, plays college soccer for the North Carolina Tar Heels.
