= Old Frostproof High School =

- U.S. National Register of Historic Places
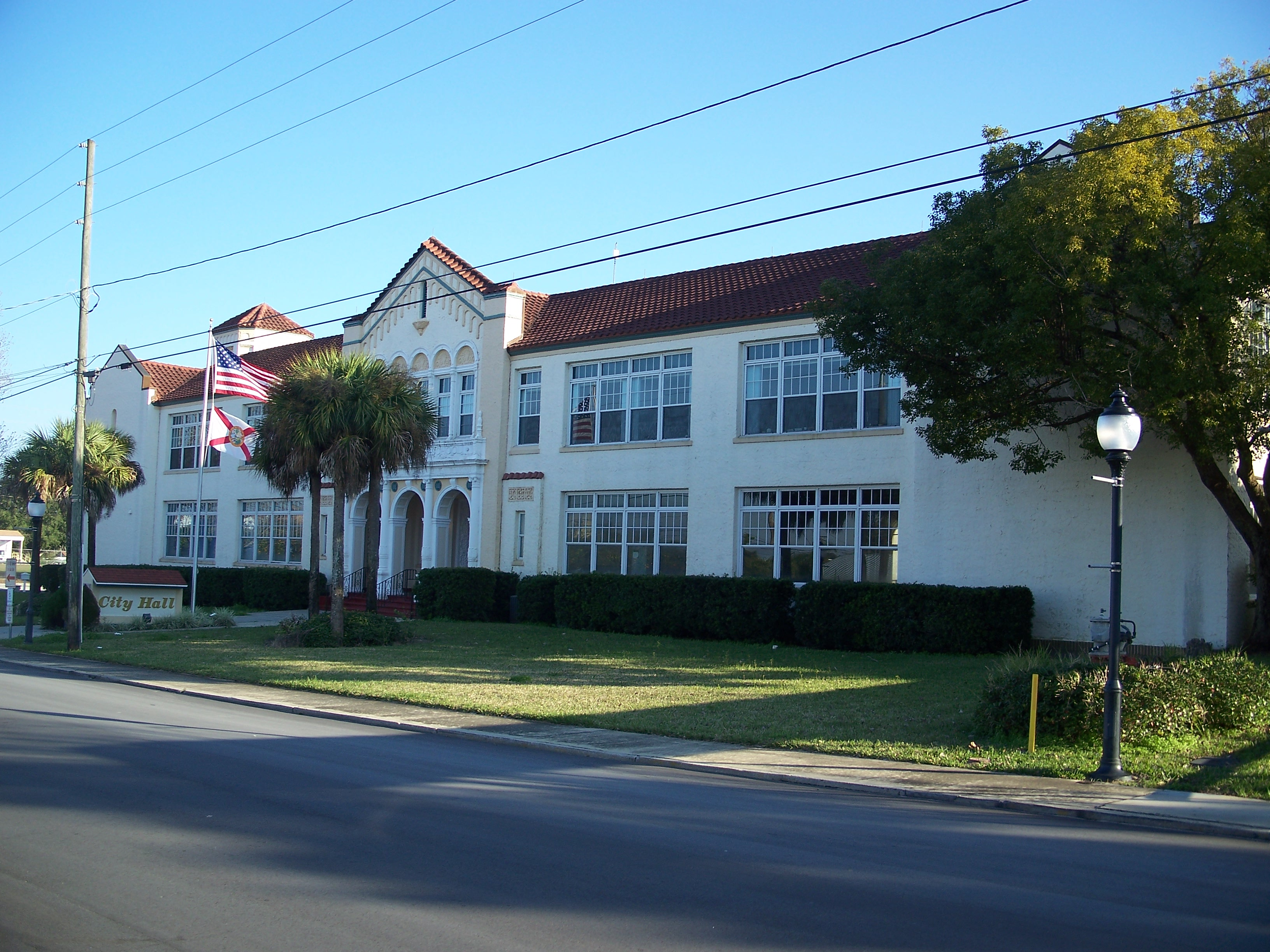

- Location within Florida Location within the United States
- Location: Frostproof, Florida
- Coordinates: 27°44′40″N 81°31′56″W
- Architect: Oscar Berg, M. Leo Eliott
- NRHP reference No.: 97001420
- Added to NRHP: November 13, 1997

The Old Frostproof High School (also known as the Frostproof City Hall) is a historic school in Frostproof, Florida. It is located at 111 West 1st Street. On November 13, 1997, it was added to the U.S. National Register of Historic Places.
