= Nick Palance =

American musician and actor

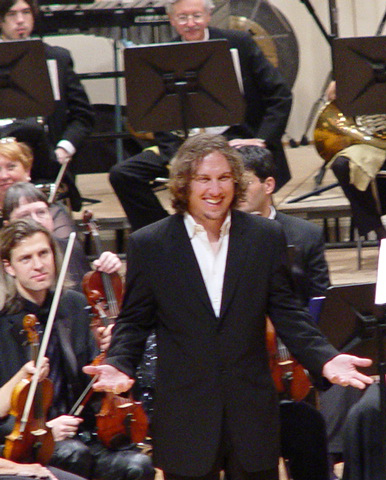
- Palance in Concert

Background information
- Born: Nicholas Steve Palance; Los Angeles, California
- Genres: Easy listening, vocal, operatic pop, pop rock
- Occupations: Singer, songwriter, musician, actor
- Instruments: Vocals, guitar, piano, cello, percussion
- Years active: 1982–present
- Label: Independent
- Website: nickpalance.com

Nicholas Steve “Nick” Palance is an American singer, musician, songwriter, and actor. As a singer and actor, Palance headlines concert halls throughout the United States and Canada. He had his first major success starring in the lead role of Andrew Lloyd Webber’s Joseph and the Amazing Technicolor Dreamcoat in the off-Broadway tour. Palance is the second cousin of Oscar-winning actor Jack Palance

After a tenure with the Canadian Tenors, Palance started his recording career under the guidance of Oscar and Grammy award-winning producer, arranger and composer, Jorge Calandrelli and famed producer, programmer, sound designer and engineer Greg Bartheld. Nick's debut album was Saving Grace.

== Early life and education ==
Palance was born the youngest of five children and was raised in LA’s Crenshaw District. His father was a musician his mother’s family built hand-crafted pipe organs as the Latapi Pipe Organ Company in Mexico City. Although their home was filled with musical instruments, they remained largely untouched. At six years old, Palance was drawn to his father’s unused Hammond organ and taught himself to play. At age nine he discovered the guitar and labored for hours becoming proficient in a variety of musical styles. At fourteen, years before he was legally allowed to enter a bar, he began writing songs and performing with rock bands at clubs on the Sunset Strip and throughout Los Angeles.

At seventeen he was drawn to the Southern California Conservatory of Music to pursue a career as a professional studio musician. Having been told by many of his fellow band members that his voice was that of a lead singer, he approached his piano teacher at the conservatory for advice. After hearing Nick sing a few scales on the piano she immediately turned to him and said, “You have to compete for the school’s vocal scholarship, it’s in two weeks.” Nick thought that she was joking, but he did compete, winning the scholarship for four consecutive years and ultimately graduating with a degree in voice and a minor in classical and commercial guitar. Thus began his career as a singer. Shortly after graduating, Nick began formal training with world-renowned baritone, Dr. Hernan Pelayo.

After a tenure with the Canadian Tenors, Palance started his recording career under the guidance of Oscar and Grammy award-winning producer Jorge Calandrelli and producer Greg Bartheld. Palance released his debut album Saving Grace in 2010 on iTunes, Pandora Radio, and CD Baby. Palance also released a DVD in 2010, entitled Nick Palance Live from El Paseo. The DVD featured Josh Groban's violinist Lisa Liu, and clips from the DVD have a total of over 152,000 combined views on YouTube.

Palance has spent the last several years traveling full-time in the United States and internationally. His repertoire spans seven languages and encompasses nearly every musical genre from opera, popera and show tunes to rock, oldies, and country.

Palance is a member of Pi Kappa Phi fraternity.

== Performances ==
Palance holds public and private concerts for celebrities, charities, communities, festivals, and politicians, such as Feast of San Gennaro William Shatner, Jerry Bruckheimer, and former California Governor Gray Davis. Palance has performed solo concerts with the Jordan Springs Symphony Orchestra in Washington DC. Nick regularly headlines at performing art centers like the Solano Performing Art Center, The Trinity Alps Performing Arts Center and entertains at places like the Pala Casino Resort and Spa in Temecula, California and Caesars Palace in Las Vegas.

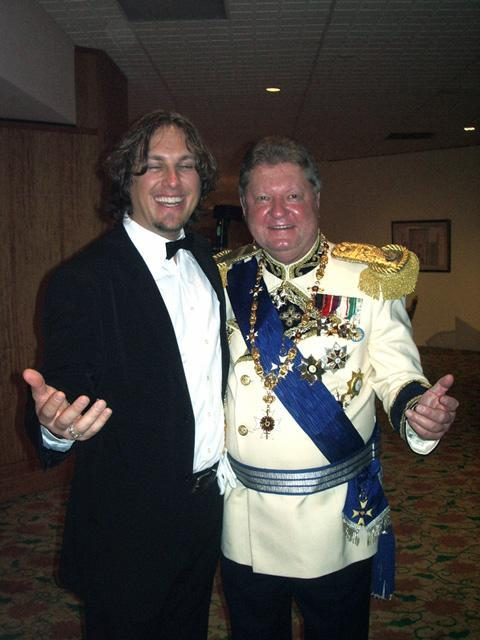
Nick Palance and His Most Eminent and Serene Highness Sbigneus Casimirus Prince Grand Master

== Charity ==
Habitat for Humanity Fundraiser: Governor Susana Martinez of New Mexico has written an official proclamation recognized Nick Palance’s efforts. Palance Holds Benefit Concert at the historic Garcia Opera House in Socorro, NM, the first operatic performance in the venue's 132-year history.

October 2007 Palance performed a benefit concert the NorthBay Breast Cancer Awareness Program and the Solano Community College Foundation. Featuring Speaker Heidi Marble and Singer Holly Stell, who performed with Palance the song Go Where Love Goes what Stell originally performed with Andrea Bocelli.

In April 2011 Palance performed in Michael Childers production of One Night Only at the McCallum Theatre in Palm Springs, CA, a charity concert that raised money for Jewish Family Services. Nick performed that evening with 20 other stars of stage and screen including Stefanie Powers, Alex Mapa, Michele Lee, Danny Gurwin, Anne Hampton Callaway, Jason Graae, and more.

Palance performs two fundraisers for the Boys & Girls Club of Coachella Valley. The Gardens On El Paseo Concert and the Del Webb Sierra Ballroom

Jewish Federation Food Pantry Benefit: The Peabody Auditorium in Daytona Beach, FL was bursting with some of theater's best show tunes on Sunday when Temple Israel in Daytona Beach presents Nick Palance and the "Best of Broadway" concert to benefit the Jewish Federation of Volusia and Flagler.

== Media coverage ==
Palance regularly gives television and radio interviews. Examples of his interviews include his Hope for the Homeless interview on KABC-TV with George Pennacchio and his Amazing Women of Power radio interview. In November 2005 the "California Central Valley Arts and Entertainment Magazine" bestowed the honor of “Artist of the Month” to Nick Palance.
