= Alico Arena =

Athletics facility at Florida Gulf Coast University, USA

- "The Nest"
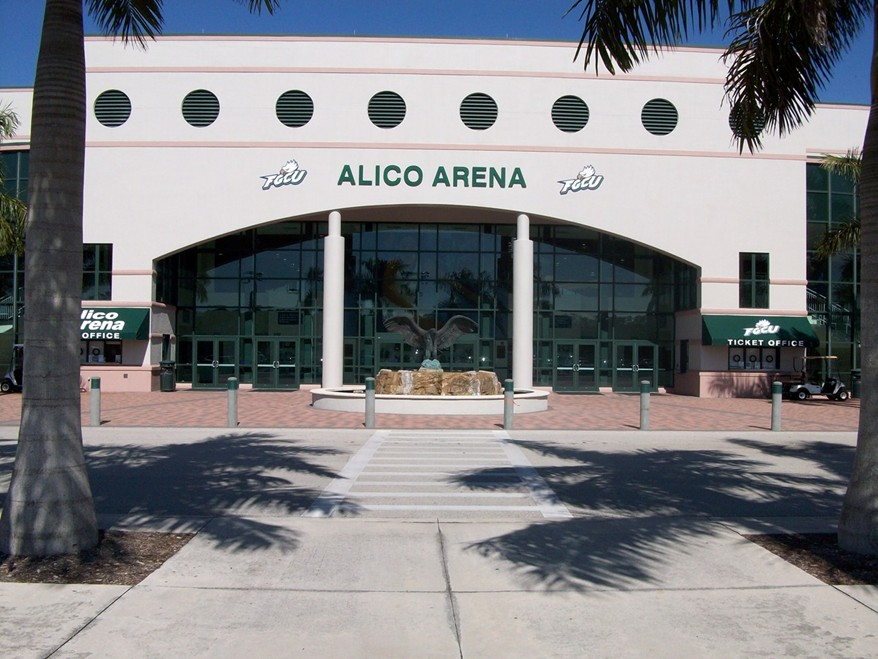
- Entrance of arena
- Interactive map of Alico Arena
- Address: FGCU Lake Parkway East
- Location: Fort Myers, Florida
- Coordinates: 26°28′16″N 81°45′53″W
- Owner: Florida Gulf Coast University
- Capacity: 4,633
- Type: Multi-purpose
- Surface: Hardwood
- Scoreboard: Yes
- Record attendance: 4,552 (Men's basketball)

Construction
- Groundbreaking: 2000
- Built: 2000–2002
- Opened: December 2, 2002
- Expanded: August 1, 2017
- Cost: $11.9 million
- Architect: Hastings+Chivetta
- Builder: Manhattan Kraft Construction, Inc.

Tenants
- FGCU Eagles Basketball; FGCU Eagles Volleyball

Website
- fgcuathletics.com

Alico Arena is a 131,000 sq ft (12,200 m^{2}) multipurpose arena located on the campus of Florida Gulf Coast University. It is the home of the FGCU Eagles volleyball and men's and women's basketball teams. It holds 4,633 people in basketball configuration. It also features four practice courts, six suites, twelve locker rooms, and the Athletics Department's offices.

The arena is named after Alico, Inc., a Florida agribusiness with ties to the university. The arena also serves as a hurricane shelter, which was used when Hurricane Ian hit the Fort Myers area in September 2022.

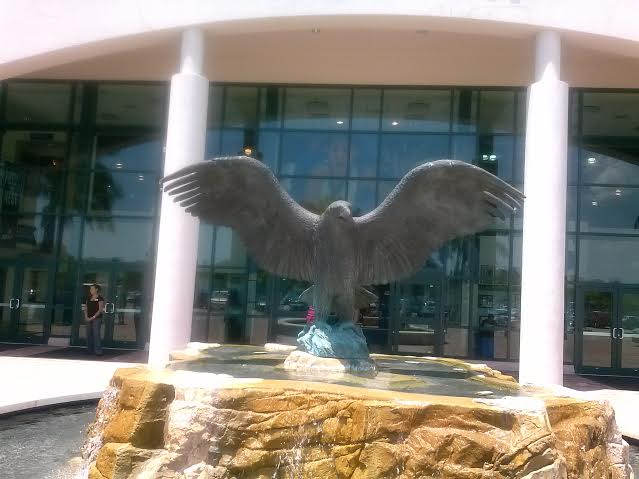
Eagle statue at the entrance of Alico Arena

== See also ==
- List of NCAA Division I basketball arenas
