= List of Pi Kappa Phi chapters =

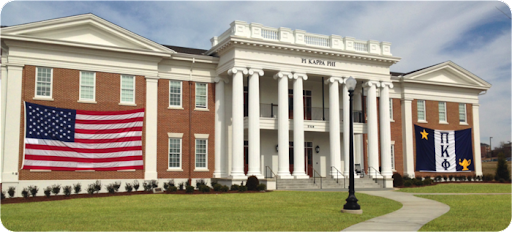
Omicron, University of Alabama

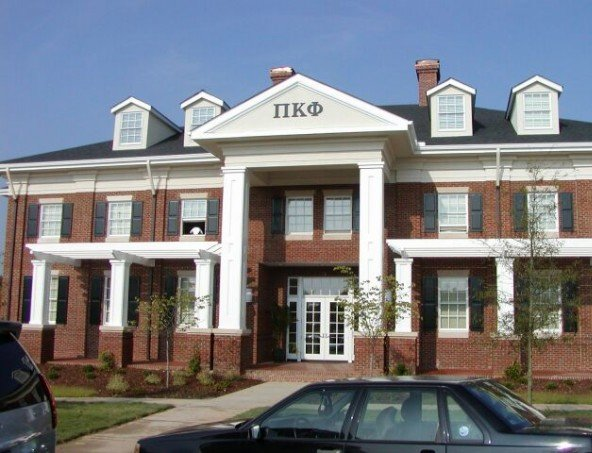
Sigma, University of South Carolina

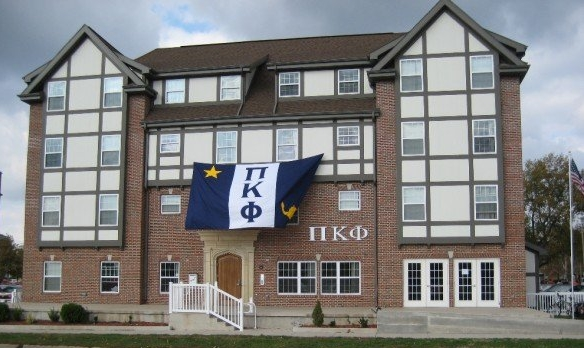
Upsilon, University of Illinois at Urbana-Champaign

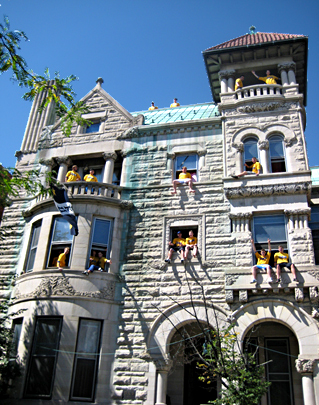
Alpha Tau, Rensselaer Polytechnic Institute

The Pi Kappa Phi fraternity has founded a total of 232 chapters in 41 U.S. states and the District of Columbia. As of May 3, 2013, there are 178 active chapters (162 chartered, plus 16 associate chapters, or colonies), and 93 alumni organizations.

Soon after its inception at The College of Charleston in 1904 (the Alpha chapter), the fraternity began spreading to other campuses, granting charters to student groups at Presbyterian College (Beta, 1907), Berkeley (Gamma, 1909), and Furman University (Delta, 1909). Gamma was the first long-distance chapter, establishing Pi Kappa Phi as a national fraternity.

In some instances during those early days, the creation of a chapter was by necessity a clandestine affair, as was the case with the Delta chapter at Furman University. At the time, South Carolina had a state law that banned fraternities at state-supported schools, so as a result, Presbyterian College and the College of Charleston were the only two South Carolina schools in which fraternities were allowed. Delta therefore operated sub rosa, until state laws were later changed to allow fraternal organizations.

The next two decades saw the addition of 36 new chapters in the Midwest, South, and West Coast. By 1930, Pi Kappa Phi had established a national presence, however, its growth slowed during the 1930s and 1940s because of the Great Depression and World War II. During the 1950s and 1960s, the fraternity began to grow more rapidly, establishing chapters across the South, and strengthening its position as a Southern fraternity. The fraternity experienced unprecedented growth from 1970 to 1999, founding over 100 new chapters and establishing a more prevalent West Coast presence while further strengthening its position in the South.

As part of The Second Century Vision campaign, the national fraternity's efforts are focused on increasing the number of active chapters. This expansion process consists of two main components: the acquisition of new chapters on previously unchartered campuses and the rechartering of inactive chapters. As of May 3, 2013, ten of the sixteen colonies are on campuses that have once hosted active collegiate chapters, and six are expansion chapters. To manage this task, the fraternity has an appointed Director of Expansion who oversees the expansion process on a national level.

Re-chartering associate chapters are new chapters that are "recolonizing" at schools in which a chapter of Pi Kappa Phi previously existed which had since gone inactive. Activation of one of these chapters means the return of the charter to campus – thereby increasing the count of active chapters, but not the count of total chapters.

New chapters that are formed at schools in which there had never been a previous chapter of Pi Kappa Phi are termed expansion chapters, otherwise known as colonies. As the name implies, they represent growth into "new territory". Accordingly, activation of one of these chapters increases the count of both active chapters and total chapters.

== Chapters ==
Following is a list of Pi Kappa Phi collegiate chapters. Active chapters are indicated in bold. Inactive chapters and institutions are in italics.

Chapter	Charter date and range	Institution	Location	Status	Ref.
**Alpha**	December 10, 1904 – 1915; 1915–2017; 2020	College of Charleston	Charleston, South Carolina	Active	(Note: Chapter started as Nu Phi, established in 1904.)
Beta	March 16, 1907 – 1912; 1921–May 2022	Presbyterian College	Clinton, South Carolina	Inactive	(Note: Revived in 1921 by absorbing the Smokers Club, established in 1912.)
Gamma	January 11, 1909 – 1941; 1947–200x ?; 2006–2023	University of California at Berkeley	Berkeley, California	Inactive	
**Delta**	March 19, 1909 – 1912; 1929–1963; 1984	Furman University	Greenville, South Carolina	Active	(Note: After going dormant, the chapter was reformed in 1929 from Phi Pi Sigma, established in the 1920s. Later, it reformed from Star & Lamp, established in 1963.)
**Sigma**	March 5, 1910 – 1913; 1927	University of South Carolina	Columbia, South Carolina	Active	(Note: Chapter formed from Emmanon Club, established in 1909. After going dormant, it reformed from Sigma Society, established in 1927.)
Zeta	April 29, 1911 – 1913; 1916-2024	Wofford College	Spartanburg, South Carolina	Inactive	(Note: Chapter formed from the Epicurean Club, established in 1909.)
Epsilon	February 3, 1912 – 1917; 1924 – February 27, 1971	Davidson College	Davidson, North Carolina	Inactive	(Note: After going dormant, the chapter reformed from Kappa Phi, established in 1923.)
Eta	April 27, 1912 – 1936; 1946–1957	Emory University	Atlanta, Georgia	Inactive	(Note: Chapter formed from the Cross Keys Club.)
**Theta**	May 29, 1913 – 1915; 2011	University of Cincinnati	Cincinnati, Ohio	Active	(Note: Chapter formed from Delta Phi Beta, established in 1912.)
**Iota**	October 25, 1913	Georgia Institute of Technology	Atlanta, Georgia	Active	
**Kappa**	November 14, 1914 – 1934; 1948–2006; 2010	University of North Carolina at Chapel Hill	Chapel Hill, North Carolina	Active	
**Lambda**	January 16, 1915 – 2009; 2011	University of Georgia	Athens, Georgia	Active	
**Mu**	May 6, 1915 – 1970; 1991–200x ?; 2006	Duke University	Durham, North Carolina	Active	(Note: After going dormant, the chapter reformed as a colony in 1984 and 2005.)
**Nu**	October 29, 1915 – 1934; 1949–1972; 1986–1995; 2009	University of Nebraska–Lincoln	Lincoln, Nebraska	Active	(Note: Chapter formed from Pi Gamma Theta, established in 1914. After going dormant, it reformed as a colony in 1948, 1985, and 2008.)
**Xi**	May 5, 1916 – 2002; 2005	Roanoke College	Salem, Virginia	Active	(Note: Chapter formed from Phi Sigma Alpha, established in 1914. After going dormant, it reformed as a colony in 2004.)
**Omicron**	April 17, 1917	University of Alabama	Tuscaloosa, Alabama	Active	(Note: Chapter formed from Kappa Phi, established in 1916.)
Pi	May 17, 1917 – 1943	Oglethorpe University	Atlanta, Georgia	Inactive	
**Rho**	February 21, 1920	Washington and Lee University	Lexington, Virginia	Active	
**Tau**	April 24, 1920 – March 25, 2015; 2019	North Carolina State University	Raleigh, North Carolina	Active	(Note: Chapter formed from Sigma Rho, established in 1917. After being banned from campus in 2015, it reformed as a colony in 2018.)
**Upsilon**	May 19, 1921 – 1932; 1935–2000; 2005–2022; April 7, 2024	University of Illinois at Urbana-Champaign	Urbana, Illinois	Active	(Note: Chapter formed from Kappa Sigma Kappa, established in 1918. After going dormant, it reformed in 1935 by absorbing Sigma Delta Rho, established in 1924. Later, it reformed as a colony in 2003.)
Phi	May 21, 1921 – 1926	University of Tulsa	Tulsa, Oklahoma	Inactive	(Note: Chapter formed from Zeta Xi, established in 1918.)
**Chi**	May 21, 1921 – 1991; 1998–2011; November 14, 2020	Stetson University	DeLand, Florida	Active	(Note: Chapter formed from Phi Beta Psi, established in 1912. After going dormant, it reformed as a colony in 1997 and 2018.)
**Psi**	November 24, 1921 – 1937; 1949–1986; 1990–2001; 2003	Cornell University	Ithaca, New York	Active	(Note: Chapter formed from Komos, established in 1916. After going dormant, it reformed as a colony in 1948, 1989, and 2002.)
**Omega**	November 24, 1922	Purdue University	West Lafayette, Indiana	Active	(Note: Chapter formed from Alpha Gamma Beta, established in 1921.)
**Alpha Alpha**	February 16, 1923 – 1939; 1948–1954; 1968	Mercer University	Macon, Georgia	Active	(Note: Chapter formed from Omega Pi, established in 1921. After going dormant, it reformed as a colony in 1966.)
Alpha Beta	May 16, 1923 – 1935	Tulane University	New Orleans, Louisiana	Inactive	(Note: Chapter formed from Lambda Sigma Epsilon, established in 1921.)
**Alpha Gamma**	May 26, 1923 – 1938; 1971–1984; 1988–2007; 2011	University of Oklahoma	Norman, Oklahoma	Active	(Note: Chapter formed from Pi Kappa, established in 1922. After going dormant, it reformed as a colony in 1969, 1986, and 2010.)
**Alpha Delta**	February 23, 1924 – 1957; 1969–1977; 1990	University of Washington	Seattle, Washington	Active	(Note: Chapter formed from Chi Upsilon Chi, established in 1921. After going dormant, it reformed as a colony in 1967 and 1989.)
**Alpha Epsilon**	February 23, 1924 – 2008; September 28, 2013	University of Florida	Gainesville, Florida	Active	(Note: Chapter formed from Phi Beta Psi, established in 1922.)
**Alpha Zeta**	December 21, 1924 – 2000; 2003	Oregon State University	Corvallis, Oregon	Active	(Note: Chapter formed from Delta Phi Sigma, established in 1921.)
**Alpha Eta**	April 25, 1925 – 1951; 1963–1990; 1991	Samford University	Homewood, Alabama	Active	(Note: Chapter formed from Psi Delta, established in 1900.)
**Alpha Theta**	May 9, 1925 – 2002; 2006- September 30, 2026	Michigan State University	East Lansing, Michigan	Inactive	(Note: Chapter formed from Orphic, established in 1917. After going dormant, it reformed as a colony in 2002.)
**Alpha Iota**	October 2, 1926	Auburn University	Auburn, Alabama	Active	(Note: Chapter formed from Tau Kappa Phi, established in 1920.)
Alpha Kappa	March 12, 1927 – 1934; 1987 – January 15, 2026	University of Michigan	Ann Arbor, Michigan	Inactive	(Note: Chapter formed from Gamma Sigma, established in 1923.)
**Alpha Lambda**	April 9, 1927 – 1940; 1949–1951; October 11, 2014	University of Mississippi	Oxford, Mississippi	Active	(Note: Chapter formed from Pi Alpha, established in 1926.)
**Alpha Mu**	November 5, 1927 – 2015; 2019	Penn State	State College, Pennsylvania	Active	(Note: Chapter formed from Chi Lambda Sigma, established in 1923.)
**Alpha Nu**	November 5, 1927 – 1936; February 27, 2010	Ohio State University	Columbus, Ohio	Active	(Note: Chapter formed from Lambda Sigma, established in 1921. After going dormant, it reformed as a colony in 2007.)
Alpha Xi	November 28, 1928 – 1991; 2002–201x ?	St. John's University	Queens, New York	Inactive	(Note: Chapter formed from Psi Sigma, established in 1901.)
**Alpha Omicron**	May 25, 1929	Iowa State University	Ames, Iowa	Active	(Note: Chapter formed from Beta Delta Rho, established in 1920.)
Alpha Pi	November 5, 1929 – 1935	University of the South	Sewanee, Tennessee	Inactive	(Note: Chapter formed from Kappa Phi, established in 1927.)
**Alpha Rho**	May 16, 1930 – 1938; 1978–May 29, 2015; 2019	West Virginia University	Morgantown, West Virginia	Active	(Note: Chapter formed from Delta Epsilon, established in 1925.)
**Alpha Sigma**	January 24, 1931 – 2013; 2018	University of Tennessee	Knoxville, Tennessee	Active	(Note: Chapter formed from Chi Sigma Delta, established in 1927. It later absorbed Theta Chi Alpha.)
**Alpha Tau**	June 13, 1931 – 2019; 2024	Rensselaer Polytechnic Institute	Troy, New York	Active	(Note: Chapter formed from Pi Kappa Pi, established in 1922.)
**Alpha Upsilon**	May 20, 1933 – 2003; November 22, 2008	Drexel University	Philadelphia Pennsylvania	Active	(Note: Chapter formed from Kappa Sigma Delta, established in 1919.)
**Alpha Phi**	May 5, 1935	Illinois Institute of Technology	Chicago, Illinois	Active	(Note: Chapter formed from Beta Psi, established in 1924.)
**Alpha Chi**	October 11, 1947 – 1969; 2009	University of Miami	Coral Gables, Florida	Active	
**Alpha Psi**	November 9, 1947 – 1986; 1988	Indiana University	Bloomington, Indiana	Active	
**Alpha Omega**	December 6, 1947 – 1961; 1965–1972; 1979–1982; 1998–200x ?; May 4, 2013	University of Oregon	Eugene, Oregon	Active	
**Beta Alpha**	May 29, 1948	New Jersey Institute of Technology	Newark, New Jersey	Active	(Note: Chapter formed from Phi Sigma Omicron, established in 1927.)
**Beta Beta**	October 16, 1948 –2002; November 9, 2013	Florida Southern College	Lakeland, Florida	Active	(Note: Chapter formed from Phi Sigma Phi, established in 1947.)
**Beta Gamma**	April 16, 1949 – 1966; 1984–1995; March 24, 2018	University of Louisville	Louisville, Kentucky	Active	(Note: Chapter formed from Tau Alpha Rho, established in 1948. After going dormant, it reformed as a colony in 1981 and 2016.)
Beta Delta	April 23, 1949 – 1994; 2011–2016	Drake University	Des Moines, Iowa	Inactive	
**Beta Epsilon**	May 8, 1949 – 1959; 1974– 1986; 1989– 1998; 2004–2016; 2019	University of Missouri	Columbia, Missouri	Active	
Beta Zeta	February 11, 1950 – 1952	Simpson College	Indianola, Iowa	Inactive	(Note: Chapter formed from Gamma Sigma Rho, established in 1948.)
Beta Eta	February 18, 1950 – 2006; 2009 – November 10, 2017	Florida State University	Tallahassee, Florida	Inactive	(Note: Chapter formed from Kappa Phi, established in 1949.)
**Beta Theta**	April 28, 1951 – 1963; 1996– 2013; 2017	University of Arizona	Tucson, Arizona	Active	
**Beta Iota**	December 8, 1951	University of Toledo	Toledo, Ohio	Active	(Note: Chapter formed from Delta Tau, established in 1947.)
**Beta Kappa**	September 25, 1954 – 1986; March 11, 1991	Georgia State University	Atlanta, Georgia	Active	(Note: Chapter formed from Zeta Chi Delta, established in 1953.)
**Beta Lambda**	April 23, 1955 – 1991; 1993–2020; 2025	University of Tampa	Tampa, Florida	Active	(Note: Chapter formed from Sigma Kappa Nu, established in 1933.)
**Beta Mu**	October 29, 1955 – 1995; 2001 – 2002; April 20, 2013	McNeese State University	Lake Charles, Louisiana	Active	(Note: Chapter formed from Delta Pi Phi, established in 1947.)
**Beta Nu**	February 4, 1956 – 1959; 2002	University of Houston	Houston, Texas	Active	(Note: Chapters formed from U Sonians, established in 1946.)
**Beta Xi**	February 25, 1956 – 1975; 1993–2007; November 16, 2012	Central Michigan University	Mount Pleasant, Michigan	Active	(Note: Chapter formed from Sigma Beta Tau, established in 1947. After going dormant, it reformed as a colony in 1992 and 2010.)
**Beta Omicron**	September 21, 1956 – 1981; February 12, 2000	Northwestern State University	Natchitoches, Louisiana	Active	(Note: Chapter formed from Pi Kappa Nu, established in 1926.)
Beta Pi	May 24, 1957 – 1962	Eastern Michigan	Ypsilanti, Michigan	Active	(Note: Chapter formed from Tau Sigma Chi, established in 1949.)
Beta Rho	November 3, 1957 – 1963	Clarkson University	Potsdam, New York	Inactive	(Note: Chapter formed from Karma, established in 1929.)
Beta Sigma	March 22, 1958 – 1960; 2006–2016	Northern Illinois University	DeKalb, Illinois	Inactive	(Note: Chapter formed from Kappa Phi, established in 1957.)
Beta Tau	January 17, 1959 – 2018	Valdosta State University	Valdosta, Georgia	Inactive	(Note: Chapter formed from Filli Fortunea, established in 1951.)
**Beta Upsilon**	May 6, 1961	University of Virginia	Charlottesville, Virginia	Active	(Note: Chapter formed from Alpha Mu (local), established in 1960.)
**Beta Phi**	February 16, 1963 – 2011; February 14, 2015 – 2018; April 10, 2026	East Carolina University	Greenville, North Carolina	Active	(Note: Chapter formed from Kappa Phi, established in 1961.)
Beta Chi	November 2, 1963 – 1994	East Texas A&M University	Commerce, Texas	Inactive	(Note: Chapter formed from Ogima Club, established in 1926.) (Note: Texas A&M University at Commerce changed its name to East Texas A&M University on 7 November 2024.)
Beta Psi	April 18, 1964 – 1982	Tennessee Wesleyan College	Athens, Tennessee	Inactive	(Note: Chapters formed from Gamma Alpha, established in 1960.)
Beta Omega	April 25, 1964 – 1987	East Tennessee State University	Johnson City, Tennessee	Inactive	
Gamma Alpha	May 2, 1964 – 2011	University of West Alabama	Livingston, Alabama	Inactive	(Note: Chapter formed from Sigma Delta Sigma, established in 1948.)
**Gamma Beta**	October 10, 1964 – 2000; March 1, 2014	Old Dominion University	Norfolk, Virginia	Active	
**Gamma Gamma**	April 9, 1966	Troy University	Troy, Alabama	Active	
Gamma Delta	May 7, 1966 – 1995; 1996–2014	University of Memphis	Memphis, Tennessee	Inactive	
**Gamma Epsilon**	November 12, 1966 – 2003; 2012	Western Carolina University	Cullowhee, North Carolina	Active	(Note: Chapter formed from Lambda Sigma Nu, established in 1965.)
Gamma Zeta	April 7, 1967 – 2000	West Virginia Tech	Montgomery, West Virginia	Inactive	(Note: Chapter formed from Psi Delta, established in 1923.)
Gamma Eta	April 15, 1967 – 1976	Athens College	Athens, Alabama	Inactive	(Note: Chapter formed from Tau Lambda Phi, established in 1965.)
**Gamma Theta**	February 24, 1968 – 2009; 2015	University of North Carolina Wilmington	Wilmington, North Carolina	Active	(Note: Chapter formed from Pi Sigma Mu, established in 1965.)
**Gamma Iota**	April 20, 1968 – 1972; 1994–2019; 2026	Louisiana State University	Baton Rouge, Louisiana	Active	
**Gamma Kappa**	November 2, 1968	Georgia Southern University	Statesboro, Georgia	Active	(Note: Chapters formed from Kappa Phi, established in 1967)
**Gamma Lambda**	November 23, 1968	Missouri University of Science and Technology	Rolla, Missouri	Active	(Note: Chapter formed from Phi Beta Iota, established in 1967.)
Gamma Mu	April 26, 1969 – 1995	Belmont Abbey College	Belmont, North Carolina	Inactive	(Note: Chapter formed from Sigma Alpha, established in 1967.)
**Gamma Nu**	May 10, 1969	LaGrange College	LaGrange, Georgia	Active	(Note: Chapter formed from Pi Delta, established in 1967.)
Gamma Xi	May 17, 1969 – 2014	Georgia Southwestern State University	Americus, Georgia	Inactive	
Gamma Omicron	May 17, 1969 – 1977	Bethel College	McKenzie, Tennessee	Inactive	(Note: Chapter formed from Zeta Chi, established in 1960.)
Gamma Pi	February 13, 1970 – 1974	Northwestern Oklahoma State University	Alva, Oklahoma	Inactive	(Note: Chapter formed from Delta Phi Omega, established in 1967.)
Gamma Rho	February 28, 1970 – 2014	Lander University	Greenwood, South Carolina	Inactive	(Note: Chapter formed from Zeta Zeta Zeta, established in 1968.)
Gamma Sigma	March 21, 1970 – 1984	Armstrong College	Savannah, Georgia	Inactive	
**Gamma Tau**	April 10, 1970 – 1976; January 22, 2011	University of North Texas	Denton, Texas	Active	(Note: Chapter formed from Delta Alpha, established in 1963.)
**Gamma Upsilon**	April 17, 1970 – 1999; 202x?	Oklahoma State University	Stillwater, Oklahoma	Active	
**Gamma Phi**	January 16, 1971	University of South Alabama	Mobile, Alabama	Active	
Gamma Chi	January 23, 1971 – 1980; 1989–1991	Jacksonville University	Jacksonville, Florida	Inactive	(Note: Chapter formed from Kappa Tau Kappa, established in 1953.)
**Gamma Psi**	April 3, 1971 – 1994; 2017	Augusta University	Augusta, Georgia	Active	(Note: Chapter formed from Kappa Phi, established in 1968.)
Gamma Omega	May 8, 1971 – 1997	University of Montevallo	Montevallo, Alabama	Inactive	(Note: Chapter formed from Phi Alpha Epsilon, established in 1968.)
Delta Alpha	May 8, 1971 – 2021	Virginia Tech	Blacksburg, Virginia	Inactive	(Note: Chapter formed from Kappa Sigma Chi, established in 1969.)
**Delta Beta**	May 22, 1971	North Georgia College	Dahlonega, Georgia	Active	(Note: Chapter formed from Kappa Phi, established in 1970.)
Delta Gamma	March 18, 1972 – 1990	University of Nebraska, Omaha	Omaha, Nebraska	Inactive	(Note: Chapter formed from Nu Beta Kappa, established in 1970.)
**Delta Delta**	April 29, 1972	Truman State University	Kirksville, Missouri	Active	
**Delta Epsilon**	May 13, 1972 – 1994; 2002	Jacksonville State	Jacksonville, Alabama	Active	
Delta Zeta	January 16, 1973 – 2015; 2017–2019	Appalachian State University	Boone, North Carolina	Inactive	
Delta Eta	February 10, 1973 – 19xx ?; 1995–2022	Morehead State University	Morehead, Kentucky	Inactive	(Note: Chapter formed from Tau Beta Kappa, established in 1968.)
Delta Theta	February 17, 1973 – 1979	Mars Hill College	Mars Hill, North Carolina	Inactive	(Note: Chapter formed from Delta Kappa Theta, established in 1971.)
**Delta Iota**	February 24, 1973 – 1980; 2003–2015; 2024	Middle Tennessee State University	Murfreesboro, Tennessee	Active	
Delta Kappa	March 24, 1973 – 1991	Pembroke State University	Pembroke, North Carolina	Inactive	(Note: Chapter formed from Phi Sigma Chi, established in 1968.)
**Delta Lambda**	September 1, 1973 – 2009; November 7, 2015	University of North Carolina at Charlotte	Charlotte, North Carolina	Active	
Delta Mu	April 20, 1974 – 1981	Methodist College	Fayetteville, North Carolina	Inactive	(Note: Chapter formed from Methodist College Mens Club, established in 1972.)
Delta Nu	April 27, 1974 – 1984	Western Kentucky University	Bowling Green, Kentucky	Inactive	
Delta Xi	May 4, 1974 – 1985	University of North Alabama	Florence, Alabama	Inactive	(Note: Chapter formed from Tau Kappa Delta, established in 1972.)
Delta Omicron	March 15, 1975 – 1983	Nicholls State University	Thibodaux, Louisiana	Inactive	
Delta Pi	March 15, 1975 1983	Wright State University	Dayton, Ohio	Inactive	
Delta Rho	February 7, 1976 – 1983; 1998–2006; 2010-–2019	University of Southern California	Los Angeles, California	Inactive	
Delta Sigma	October 16, 1976 – 2017; 2019–2022	Bowling Green University	Bowling Green, Ohio	Inactive	
**Delta Tau**	January 21, 1977	James Madison University	Harrisonburg, Virginia	Active	
**Delta Upsilon**	February 24, 1978 – 2003; 2012	University of Pittsburgh	Pittsburgh, Pennsylvania	Active	
Delta Phi	April 1, 1978 – 1996; 2006–June 2016	Radford University	Radford, Virginia	Inactive	
**Delta Chi**	April 15, 1978 – 2007; November 8, 2014	Kansas State University	Manhattan, Kansas	Active	
**Delta Psi**	November 18, 1978 – 1984; 1989–2017; August 27, 2023	University of Texas at Arlington	Arlington, Texas	Active	(Note: Chapter formed from Tarkus.)
**Delta Omega**	April 14, 1979 – 1988; 1990	Texas A&M University	College Station, Texas	Active	
Epsilon Alpha	April 28, 1979 – 1993; 2001–2015	Elon University	Elon, North Carolina	Inactive	(Note: Chapter formed from Sigma Rho, established in 1977.)
Epsilon Beta	April 28, 1979 – 1991; 2018	Grand Valley State University	Allendale, Michigan	Active	
**Epsilon Gamma**	September 29, 1979 – 2001; March 4, 2011	Longwood College	Farmville, Virginia	Active	
Epsilon Delta	February 9, 1980 – 1998	Auburn University Montgomery	Montgomery, Alabama	Inactive	
Epsilon Epsilon	March 1, 1980 – 2023	University of Virginia's College at Wise	Wise, Virginia	Inactive	(Note: Chapter formed from Tau Beta Chi, established in 1977.)
Epsilon Zeta	April 5, 1980 – 1990	University of Central Arkansas	Conway, Arkansas	Inactive	
**Epsilon Eta**	April 12, 1980 – 1996; 2009	Winthrop University	Rock Hill, South Carolina	Active	
**Epsilon Theta**	November 14, 1980 – 2011; November 18, 2016	Seton Hall University	South Orange, New Jersey	Active	
**Epsilon Iota**	January 16, 1981	University of North Carolina Greensboro	Greensboro, North Carolina	Active	
Epsilon Kappa	January 31, 1981 – December 31, 2014	Southern Polytechnic State University	Marietta, Georgia	Consolidated	(Note: Consolidated with Eta Delta chapter.)
Epsilon Lambda	May 2, 1981 – 1988; 1933–2019	University of South Carolina Upstate	Spartanburg, South Carolina	Inactive	
**Epsilon Mu**	February 26, 1982	Bradley University	Peoria, Illinois	Active	
**Epsilon Nu**	February 26, 1982 – 1994; 199x ? – xxxx ?; November 16, 2013	California State University, Sacramento	Sacramento, California	Active	
Epsilon Xi	April 16, 1982 – November 19, 2019	La Salle University	Philadelphia, Pennsylvania	Inactive	
**Epsilon Omicron**	December 10, 1982 – 1997; 2016	Villanova University	Villanova, Pennsylvania	Active	
Epsilon Pi	December 3, 1983 – 2001; 2015 – September 17, 2022	Virginia Commonwealth University	Richmond, Virginia	Inactive	(Note: The university suspended the chapter until May 15, 2025. The fraternity's national headquarters revoked the chapter's charter, effective January 18, 2023.)
**Epsilon Rho**	December 3, 1983	Lenoir-Rhyne University	Hickory, North Carolina	Active	
Epsilon Sigma	December 10, 1983 – 2001	Christian Brothers University	Memphis, Tennessee	Inactive	
Epsilon Tau	December 10, 1983 – 2001	St. Joseph's University	Philadelphia, Pennsylvania	Inactive	
**Epsilon Upsilon**	May 5, 1984	Georgia College and State University	Milledgeville, Georgia	Active	(Note: Chapter formed from Beta Chi, established in 1980.)
**Epsilon Phi**	February 23, 1985	University of Alabama at Birmingham	Birmingham, Alabama	Active	
**Epsilon Chi**	February 23, 1985 – 1987; 2016	University of Denver	Denver, Colorado	Active	
**Epsilon Psi**	April 13, 1985	Slippery Rock University of Pennsylvania	Slippery Rock, Pennsylvania	Active	
**Epsilon Omega**	March 1, 1986 – 1995; 1998–2020	Texas Tech University	Lubbock, Texas	Colony	(Note: Chapter reformed as a colony in 2021.)
**Zeta Alpha**	August 20, 1988 – 2011; March 7, 2015	Clemson University	Clemson, South Carolina	Active	(Note: Chapter formed from Phi Alpha Sigma, established in 1982.)
**Zeta Beta**	May 24, 1986 – 1999; 202x ?	University of California, San Diego	San Diego, California	Active	
Zeta Gamma	November 21, 1986 – 2016	University of North Dakota	Grand Forks, North Dakota	Inactive	
Zeta Delta	December 6, 1986 – 2004	Shippensburg University	Shippensburg, Pennsylvania	Inactive	
**Zeta Epsilon**	December 6, 1986	George Mason University	Fairfax, Virginia	Active	
Zeta Zeta	May 1, 1987 – 2014	University of North Florida	Jacksonville, Florida	Inactive	
**Zeta Eta**	January 22, 1988 – 1993; April 19, 2012	University of South Florida	Tampa	Active	(Note: Chapter formed from Alpha Tau Tau, established in 1982.)
Zeta Theta	March 5, 1988 – 1995; 2009–October 2019	University of Texas at Austin	Austin, Texas	Inactive	(Note: Suspended for hazing in October 2019.)
Zeta Iota	April 9, 1988 – 1998	Indiana University of Pennsylvania	Indiana, Pennsylvania	Inactive	
Zeta Kappa	April 23, 1988 – 1994; 1997–2010	Richard Stockton College	Pomona, New Jersey	Inactive	
Zeta Lambda	December 4, 1988 – 2000	California State University, Chico	Chico, California	Inactive	(Note: Chapter formed from Chi Psi Omega, established in 1987.)
Zeta Mu	January 21, 1989 – 2014	California State University Northridge	Northridge, California	Inactive	
Zeta Nu	January 28, 1989 – 2021	West Chester University	West Chester, Pennsylvania	Inactive	
**Zeta Xi**	April 1, 1989 – 2013	Averett University	Danville, Virginia	Colony	(Note: Chapter formed from Delta Pi Alpha. It reformed as a colony in 2022.)
Zeta Omicron	April 15, 1989 – August 15, 2013	SUNY Cortland	Cortland, New York	Inactive	
Zeta Pi	September 29, 1989 – 2007; November 5, 2011 – April 2017	Marshall University	Huntington, West Virginia	Inactive	
Zeta Rho	January 20, 1990 2023	California State University Fullerton	Fullerton, California	Inactive	
**Zeta Sigma**	April 1990–1995; May 3, 2014	University of California, Davis	Davis, California	Active	
**Zeta Tau**	April 21, 1990 – 2023	Barton College	Wilson, North Carolina	Active	
Zeta Upsilon	April 28, 1990 1995	Bloomsburg University	Bloomsburg, Pennsylvania	Inactive	
Zeta Phi	November 3, 1990 – 1993; 1996–2021	Colorado State University	Fort Collins, Colorado	Inactive	
**Zeta Chi**	November 10, 1990	Albright College	Reading, Pennsylvania	Active	
Zeta Psi	April 1, 1991 – 2000	Indiana University – Purdue University Indianapolis	Indianapolis, Indiana	Inactive	
Zeta Omega	April 13, 1991 – 1998	Towson State University	Towson, Maryland	Inactive	
Eta Alpha	1991 – August 15, 2013	Concord University	Athens, West Virginia	Inactive	
**Eta Beta**	November 9, 1991 – 1997; 2007	Indiana State University	Terre Haute, Indiana	Active	
**Eta Gamma**	November 23, 1991	University of Colorado at Boulder	Boulder, Colorado	Active	
**Eta Delta**	December 14, 1991	Kennesaw State University	Kennesaw, Georgia	Active	
**Eta Epsilon**	February 1, 1992 – 2003; March 3, 2017	University of Maryland, College Park	College Park, Maryland	Active	
Eta Zeta	May 16, 1992 – 2019	Queens University of Charlotte	Charlotte, North Carolina	Inactive	
Eta Eta	May 30, 1992 – 1998; March 1, 2014 – 2020	University of California, Irvine	Irvine, California	Inactive	
**Eta Theta**	March 20, 1993 – 1997; March 29, 2014	University of San Francisco	San Francisco, California	Active	
**Eta Iota**	April 3, 1993 – 2016	Christopher Newport University	Newport News, Virginia	Colony	(Note: Chapter reformed as a colony in 2022.)
Eta Kappa	April 17, 1993 – 2001; March 28, 2014 – 201x ?	SUNY Plattsburgh	Plattsburgh, New York	Inactive	
**Eta Lambda**	May 1, 1993	SUNY Brockport	Brockport, New York	Active	
**Eta Mu**	December 4, 1993	Wingate University	Wingate, North Carolina	Active	
**Eta Nu**	April 9, 1994 – 2015	University of Pennsylvania	Philadelphia, Pennsylvania	Colony	(Note: Chapter reformed as a colony in 2023.)
Eta Xi	May 21, 1994 – 2003	SUNY Albany	Albany, New York	Inactive	
Eta Omicron	November 5, 1994 – 2021	San Francisco State University	San Francisco, California	Inactive	(Note: Chapter formed from Zeta Psi Tau, established in 1990.)
**Eta Pi**	November 11, 1995	Coastal Carolina University	Conway, South Carolina	Active	
Eta Rho	April 13, 1996 – 2020	Texas State University	San Marcos, Texas	Inactive	
Eta Sigma	June 1, 1996 – 2023	University of California, Los Angeles	Los Angeles, California	Inactive	
Eta Tau	October 26, 1996 – 2014	University of Kentucky	Lexington, Kentucky	Inactive	
**Eta Epsilon**	November 23, 1996	Miami University	Oxford, Ohio	Active	
**Eta Phi**	February 22, 1997	University of Maryland, Baltimore County	Catonsville, Maryland	Active	(Note: Chapter formed from Pi Kappa Upsilon, established in 1991.)
**Eta Chi**	March 7, 1998	Texas Christian University	Fort Worth, Texas	Active	
**Eta Psi**	March 27, 1999 – 2006; March 22, 2014	University of Central Florida	Orlando, Florida	Active	
Eta Omega	April 17, 1999 – 2016	New Mexico State University	Las Cruces, New Mexico	Inactive	
**Theta Alpha**	April 24, 1999	University of Southern Mississippi	Hattiesburg, Mississippi	Active	
Theta Beta	April 15, 2000 – 2015	University of West Georgia	Carrollton, Georgia	Inactive	
**Theta Gamma**	December 10, 2000 – 2001; November 15, 2015	University at Buffalo	Buffalo, New York	Active	
**Theta Delta**	February 3, 2002 – 2018; April 20, 2024	Florida International University	Miami, Florida	Active	
Theta Epsilon	December 8, 2001 – 2020	University of Kansas	Lawrence, Kansas	Inactive	
Theta Zeta	November 16, 2002 – 2016	George Washington University	Washington, D.C.	Inactive	
Theta Eta	April 23, 2005 – 2018	American University	Washington, D.C.	Inactive	
**Theta Theta**	April 29, 2005	University of Iowa	Iowa City, Iowa	Active	
**Theta Iota**	September 10, 2005	Washington State University	Pullman, Washington	Active	
**Theta Kappa**	November 5, 2005	Baylor University	Waco, Texas	Inactive	
**Theta Lambda**	April 1, 2006	Missouri State University	Springfield, Missouri	Active	
**Theta Mu**	December 9, 2006	University of Massachusetts Amherst	Amherst, Massachusetts	Active	
**Theta Nu**	March 3, 2007	University of Delaware	Newark, Delaware	Active	
**Theta Xi**	April 21, 2007	Arizona State University	Phoenix, Arizona	Active	
**Theta Omicron**	November 17, 2007	University of Nevada, Reno	Reno, Nevada	Active	
Theta Pi	December 1, 2007 – 2017	University of Texas at Tyler	Tyler, Texas	Inactive	
Theta Rho	April 12, 2008 – April 28, 2020	Western Michigan University	Kalamazoo, Michigan	Inactive	(Note: Chpataer was suspended for numerous risk management violations.)
**Theta Sigma**	April 19, 2008	California State University, Long Beach	Long Beach, California	Active	
**Theta Tau**	April 19, 2008 – 2018; 2023	High Point University	High Point, North Carolina	Active	
**Theta Upsilon**	February 7, 2009	Northern Arizona University	Flagstaff, Arizona	Active	
**Theta Phi**	March 21, 2009	Louisiana Tech University	Ruston, Louisiana	Active	
Theta Chi	November 14, 2009 – 2021	Ohio University	Athens, Ohio	Inactive	
**Theta Psi**	March 13, 2010	Rochester Institute of Technology	Rochester, New York	Active	
**Theta Omega**	October 30, 2010 – 2016; November 7, 2025	Binghamton University	Binghamton, New York	Active	
**Iota Alpha**	February 18, 2011	Sacred Heart University	Fairfield, Connecticut	Active	
**Iota Beta**	April 1, 2011	University of Texas San Antonio	San Antonio, Texas	Active	
Iota Gamma	April 9, 2011 – 201x ?	University of Wyoming	Laramie, Wyoming	Inactive	
**Iota Delta**	April 16, 2011 – 2014; November 4, 2023	University of New Hampshire	Durham, New Hampshire	Active	
**Iota Epsilon**	April 16, 2011	Susquehanna University	Selinsgrove, Pennsylvania	Active	
**Iota Zeta**	April 30, 2011	Stephen F. Austin State University	Nacogdoches, Texas	Active	
**Iota Eta**	April 30, 2011	Embry Riddle Aeronautical University	Prescott, Arizona	Active	
**Iota Theta**	October 22, 2011	Tennessee Tech University	Cookeville, Tennessee	Active	
**Iota Iota**	October 29, 2011	California State Polytechnic University, Pomona	Pomona, California	Active	
**Iota Kappa**	November 12, 2011	University of Northern Colorado	Greeley, Colorado	Active	
**Iota Lambda**	October 20, 2012	Quinnipiac University	Hamden, Connecticut	Active	
**Iota Mu**	October 20, 2012	University of Arkansas – Fort Smith	Fort Smith, Arkansas	Active	
**Iota Nu**	November 9, 2012	Mississippi State University	Starkville, Mississippi	Active	
**Iota Xi**	November 9, 2012	University of Texas at Dallas	Richardson, Texas	Active	
**Iota Omicron**	March 23, 2013	Iona College	New Rochelle, New York	Active	
**Iota Pi**	April 13, 2013	University of Dayton	Dayton, Ohio	Active	
**Iota Rho**	October 18, 2013	Western Illinois University	Macomb, Illinois	Active	
**Iota Sigma**	November 9, 2013 – 2015; 2018	San Jose State University	San Jose, California	Active	
**Iota Tau**	February 15, 2014	Rutgers, the State University of New Jersey	New Brunswick, New Jersey	Active	
**Iota Upsilon**	October 25, 2014	Florida Gulf Coast University	Fort Myers, Florida	Active	
Iota Phi	November 8, 2014 - 2026	Loyola University New Orleans	New Orleans, Louisiana	Inactive	
Iota Chi	November 14, 2014 – 2023	Ball State University	Muncie, Indiana	Inactive	
Iota Psi	December 6, 2014 – 2020	Boise State University	Boise, Idaho	Inactive	
Iota Omega	March 6, 2015 – 2020	University of Nevada, Las Vegas	Las Vegas, Nevada	Inactive	
Kappa Alpha	April 11, 2015 – 2023	Case Western Reserve University	Cleveland, Ohio	Inactive	
Kappa Beta	April 11, 2015 – 2021	Illinois State University	Normal, Illinois	Inactive	
Kappa Gamma	April 18, 2015 – 2019	University of Montana	Missoula, Montana	Inactive	
**Kappa Delta**	April 18, 2015	Florida Atlantic University	Boca Raton, Florida	Active	
**Kappa Epsilon**	October 31, 2015	Stony Brook University	Stony Brook, New York	Active	
**Kappa Zeta**	November 18, 2015	University of Maine	Orono, Maine	Active	
Kappa Eta	April 1, 2016 - 2021	SUNY Geneseo	Geneseo, New York	Inactive	
**Kappa Theta**	April 23, 2016	University of San Diego	San Diego, California	Active	
**Kappa Iota**	April 20, 2016	University of Idaho	Moscow, Idaho	Active	
Kappa Kappa	October 23, 2016 – 20xx ?	University of New Mexico	Rio Rancho, New Mexico	Inactive	
**Kappa Lambda**	November 5, 2016	University of Wisconsin-Madison	Madison, Wisconsin	Active	
**Kappa Mu**	April 22, 2017	University of California	Merced, California	Active	
**Kappa Nu**	April 29, 2017	Sonoma State	Rohnert Park, California	Active	
**Kappa Xi**	October 15, 2017	DePaul University	Chicago, Illinois	Active	
**Kappa Omicron**	October 14, 2017	University of Connecticut	Storrs, Connecticut	Inactive	
**Kappa Pi**	April 7, 2018	California Polytechnic State University, San Luis Obispo	San Luis Obispo, California	Active	
**Lambda Iota**	April 13, 2018	University of Vermont	Burlington, Vermont	Active	(Note: Chapter was chartered as Kappa Rho in 2018, but changed its name to Lambda Iota on October 2, 2019, to signal absorption of the program, assets and alumni of a very old (1836) local fraternity called the Lambda Iota Society.)
**Kappa Sigma**	April 14, 2018	University of Colorado at Colorado Springs	Colorado Springs, Colorado	Active	
Kappa Tau	May 5, 2018 – 2022	Eastern Washington University	Cheney, Washington	Inactive	
**Kappa Upsilon**	April 27, 2019	Temple University	Philadelphia, Pennsylvania	Active	
**Kappa Phi**	2019	Loyola University Chicago	Chicago, Illinois	Active	
**Kappa Chi**	November 21, 2020	Northeastern University	Boston, Massachusetts	Active	
**Kappa Psi**	February 4, 2023	Wake Forest University	Winston-Salem, North Carolina	Active	
**Kappa Omega**	April 22, 2023	University of Utah	Salt Lake City, Utah	Active	
**Lambda Alpha**	November 24, 2024	Belmont University	Nashville, Tennessee	Active	
**Lambda Beta**	April 5, 2025	Syracuse University	Syracuse, New York	Active	
**University of New Mexico Associate Chapter**		University of New Mexico	Albuquerque, New Mexico	Colony	
