= Ryan Crow =

American television producer (born 1979)

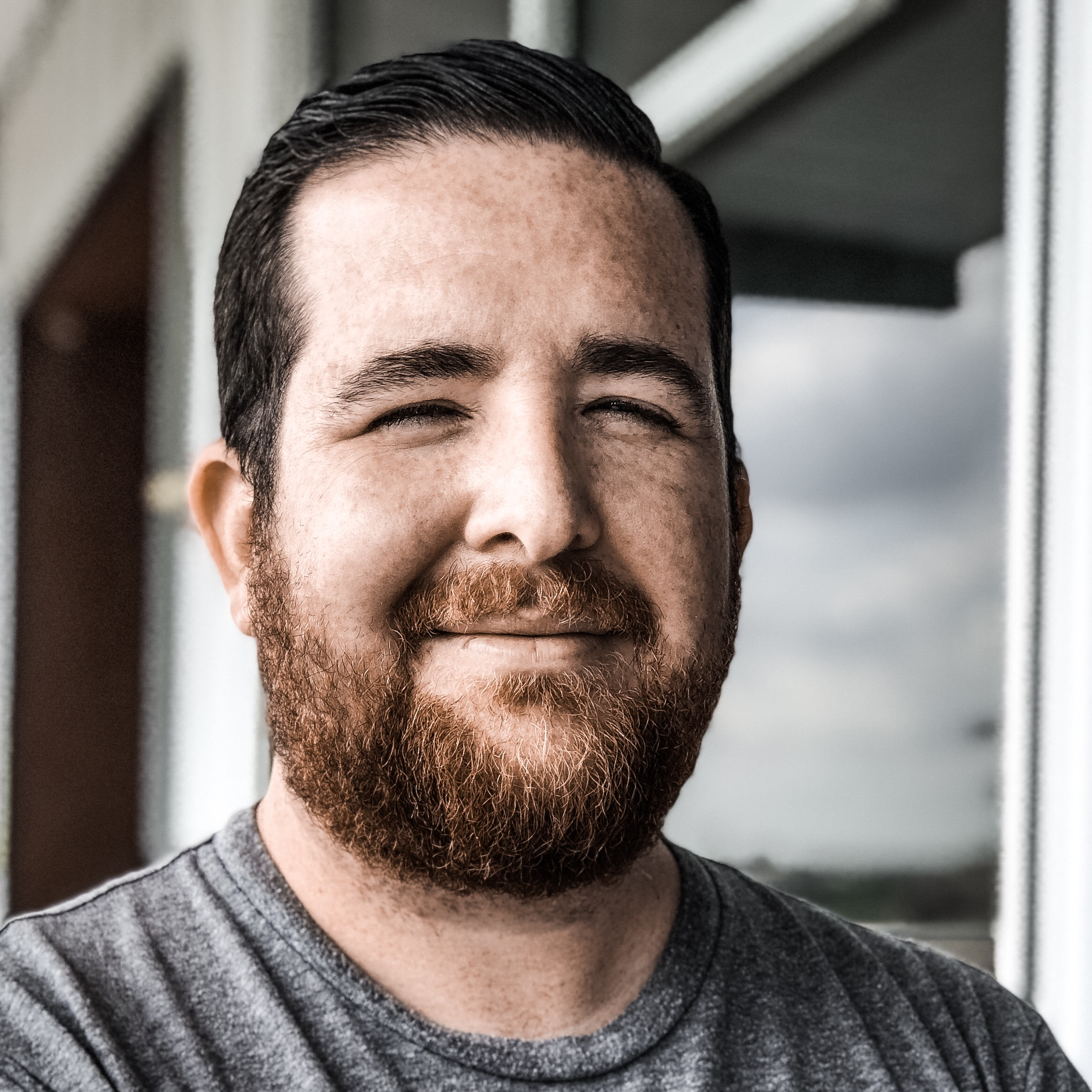
Ryan Crow (2018)

Ryan Crow (born November 26, 1979) is an American reality television producer/director. He is an alumnus of UCLA, graduating with a degree in Political Science in 2002. His most notable credits include The Simple Life, Rock of Love with Bret Michaels, and Keeping Up with the Kardashians. Ryan Crow served as the executive producer of "Gnarkatz" premiering August 8, 2017 on go90.com. Working with many production companies, he continues to produce projects for various networks. Ryan recently worked with Robert Rodriguez, executive producing "Rebel Without a Crew: The Series" for El Rey Network and the Disney+ streaming platform for the series "Pick of the Litter". Right before the COVID-19 pandemic, Ryan left television and now works at Cisco TV as the Experis Lead for the Cisco Studios division. He resides in Discovery Bay, CA with his wife Kelley Crow and their 2 children.
