= Colony (fraternity or sorority) =

Probationary body of a national fraternity or sorority

A colony is a probationary body of a national fraternity or sorority. It can be considered a new Greek organization that is awaiting official recognition from their international headquarters to maintain a chapter on their college’s campus. A group wishing to become a member of a fraternity or sorority must first petition for status as a colony. The entire membership of the colony remains as uninitiated associates, usually learning and operating under the guidance of an advisor from the national organization and/or from a sponsoring chapter.

If the colony prospers and meets its goals as set out by the national organization, the colony may later be chartered and the membership initiated. After this the sorority or fraternity will become a full chapter of the fraternity. This practice varies with different sororities and fraternities; however, many of them follow procedures and practices very similar to one another. Everything depends on the official nationals of each individual organization.

== History ==
The first Greek society was Phi Beta Kappa and was founded in 1776 as a literary and debating club. The oldest social fraternity is the Kappa Alpha Society, formed at Union College in New York in 1825. This fraternity was soon followed by several others in the following years.

Several other Greek organizations were formed through the twentieth century. With each separate sorority and fraternity, others began to charter existing organizations at different schools. This became popular in the 1900s, especially after World War I and the Great Depression.

== Nomenclature ==
The term "Colony" is the most commonly accepted word used to describe new local groups being formed. However, some organizations have adopted alternative terminology, responding to sensitivities over the potential politically-charged origin of this word. Synonyms include "Provisional Chapter", "Probationary Chapter", "Associate Chapter", or for the newest of groups, "Interest Groups". These terms may be further defined within the legal framework of a specific fraternity, sorority or society to have particular meanings. Regardless of which word is used, a colony is generally probationary in nature and has not yet been granted a charter or warrant enabling it to have legal status as a unit of the national organization.

== Practices and procedures ==
Different Greek organizations have different practices and procedures when establishing colonies and maturing them into chapters. Not only does this process depend on the specific Greek organization, but it also depends on the standards and rules that are set by each individual university. However, many organizations have a process that is similar to this:

1. A group of men or women must contact the organization’s nationals to request the colonization of the organization. After the request is evaluated and approved, these men and women will be considered the Founding Fathers or Founding Sisters of that Greek organization.
2. Typically, it takes anywhere from eighteen months to thirty-six months for the entire process to take place. Within these two years the colony must be able to effectively prove to the national organization that they will be able to operate efficiently in all areas of chapter operations. These areas include philanthropy, payments, and recruiting and maintaining members consistently.
3. After the colony has proven to the nationals that they can maintain their chapter, the men or women of the organization are then initiated into the desired Fraternity or Sorority by the national organization.

National, or when available, local alumni volunteers will work with the colony to establish effective chapter operations, develop scholarship programs, teach recruitment skills and devise a long-term plan of action. For most Greek organizations, there is a good chance that there are at least several alumni near the given school. Most sororities or fraternities get into contact with these alumni through their nationals. Nationals also send what can be referred to as "Education Consultants," who are paid by the organization, to spend time with the colony to teach them all of the traditions, values and ways of the fraternity or sorority. Staff members from the national organizations assist the colony as needed in the process of earning a charter, giving them formal and legal recognition as a chapter.

== Role as a colony ==
As a colony, most universities allow the members to participate in all Greek activities on campus. These activities include the Interfraternity Council, or IFC; Panhellenic Council, or PHC; student government, new-student orientation; intramural athletics; leadership honoraries and other such activities. These activities can give colony members an opportunity to get established in their university’s Greek community and meet potential new members that later could join their colony or chapter.
