= Pi Kappa Phi =

American collegiate fraternity

- ΠΚΦ
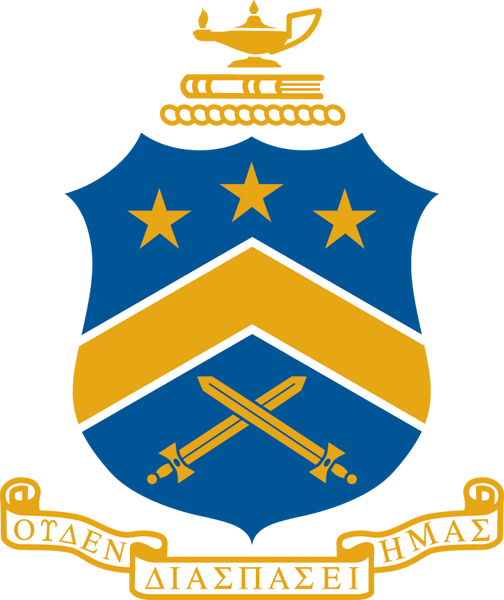
- Founded: December 10, 1904; 121 years ago College of Charleston
- Type: Social
- Affiliation: NIC
- Status: Active
- Scope: National
- Motto: ΟΥΔΕΝ ΔΙΑΣΠΑΣΕΙ ΗΜΑΣ "Nothing shall ever tear us asunder"
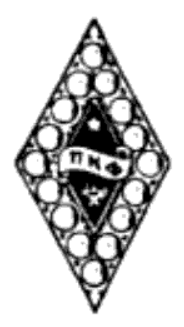
- Member badge
- Colors: Primary; Gold; White; Auxiliary color Royal Blue
- Symbol: Bell, Star, and Lamp
- Flag
- Flower: Red Rose
- Jewel: Diamond
- Publication: The Star and Lamp
- Philanthropy: The Ability Experience
- Chapters: 187 active
- Colonies: 19
- Members: 12,523 (as of 2017) active 132,526 (as of 2017) lifetime
- Headquarters: 3701 Arco Corporate Drive, Suite #500; Charlotte, North Carolina 28273; United States
- Website: www.pikapp.org

Pi Kappa Phi (ΠΚΦ), commonly known as Pi Kapp(s), is an American Greek Letter secret and social fraternity. It was founded by Andrew Alexander Kroeg Jr., Lawrence Harry Mixson, and Simon Fogarty Jr. on December 10, 1904 at the College of Charleston in Charleston, South Carolina. The fraternity has 187 active chapters (168 chartered chapters and 19 associate chapters), and more than 113,000 initiated members.

Pi Kappa Phi's mission statement is "To create an uncommon and lifelong brotherhood that develops leaders and encourages service to others for the betterment of our communities." The fraternity's vision statement is "A future where every Pi Kappa Phi embraces his role as a leader, puts service before self and improves the world around him."

Pi Kappa Phi operates in four entities: Pi Kappa Phi Fraternity, Pi Kappa Phi Foundation, The Ability Experience, and Pi Kappa Phi Properties. Pi Kappa Phi operates its own philanthropy, The Ability Experience (formerly known as Push America), which works with individual chapters to serve people with disabilities. Among the most notable members are former Senator Lindsey Graham, former Wisconsin Governor and founder of Earth Day Gaylord Nelson, baseball hall of famer Joe Sewell, social media entrepreneur and actor Jimmy Tatro, politician George Wallace Jr., and several former governors of the states of Mississippi, South Carolina, North Carolina, and Pennsylvania.

== History ==
=== Nu Phi ===
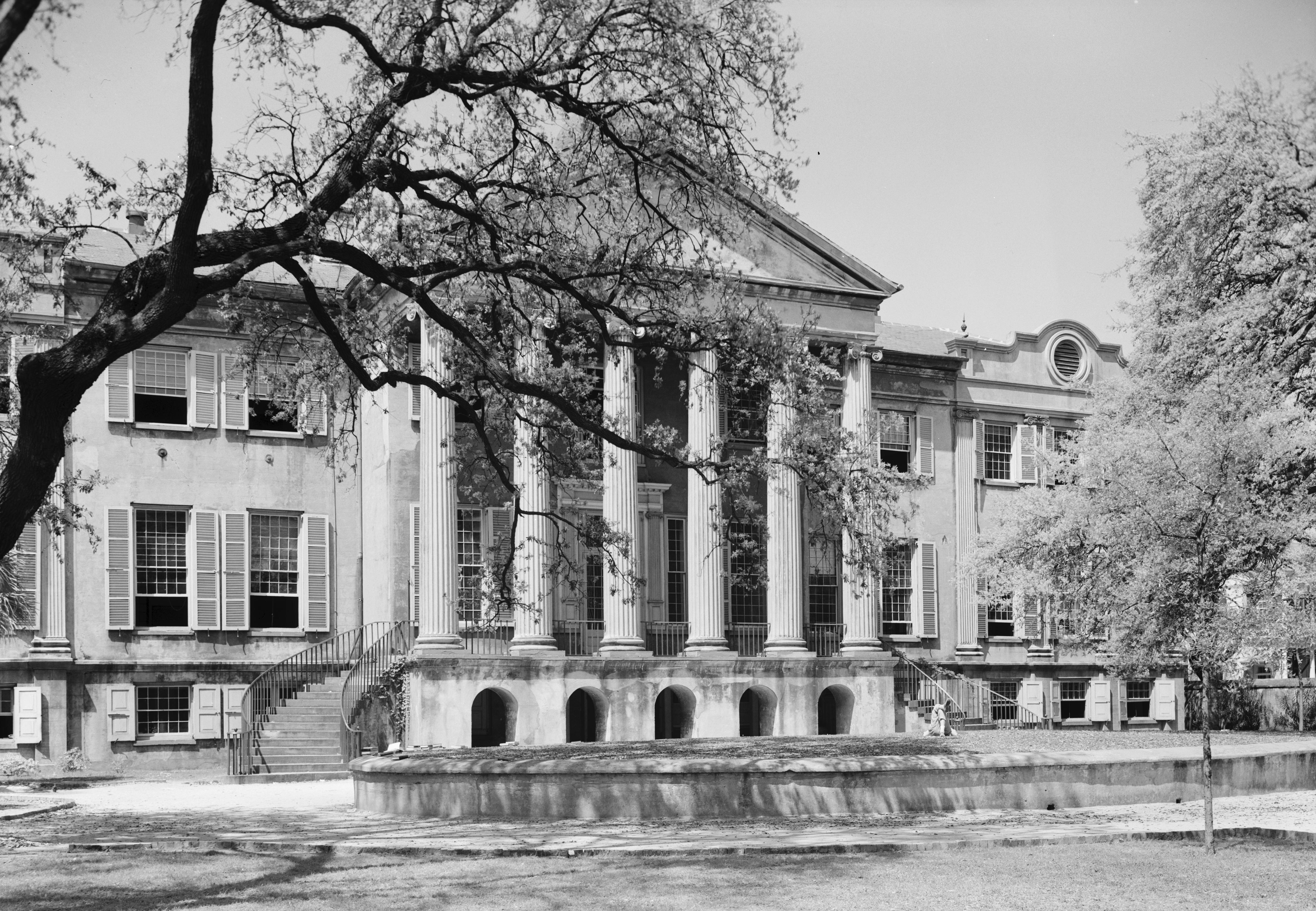
The College of Charleston

Pi Kappa Phi was founded in 1904 by Andrew Alexander Kroeg Jr., a 19-year-old senior at the college; Simon Fogarty Jr., a 17-year-old junior; and Lawrence Harry Mixson, a 16-year-old sophomore. All three of the men were from Charleston.

In 1904, the College of Charleston was a small, municipal college. The all-male college was the first municipal college in the country, and the thirteenth oldest educational institution in the United States. The school had a campus literary society called the Chrestomathics, which held activities such as debates. The college's monthly magazine was staffed by the officers of the Chrestomathics, forming the equivalent of a modern-day student government.

The three men set a goal to obtain officer positions within the Chrestomathic Literary Society. At that time, the organization was dominated by the three chapters of national fraternities on campus. All fraternity men were sworn to vote for their candidates, making it virtually impossible for any non-fraternity men to win election.

Kroeg, Mixson, Fogarty, and a group of their friends, all non-fraternity men, began forming an opposition party. Several meetings were held at Mixson's home on Wentworth Street leading to the formation of Nu Phi, which stood for "non-fraternity." The group of 15 men developed an opposing slate and began campaigning. Nu Phi adopted the outline of a hand as its secret symbol. A sketched hand on a classroom chalkboard signified an upcoming meeting. Inside the hand was written the meeting time and the host's last name.

The Nu Phi group assigned a member to kidnap those who might vote for the fraternity ticket on election day. However, the Nu Phi ticket lost the elections. Later, it was revealed that several disloyal members cast their votes for the opposing fraternity slate. Kroeg, determined to see his friends have a chance at winning elections, decided that the only way to gain the influence of the fraternity men on campus was to begin his own fraternity.

=== Founding ===
Andrew Alexander Kroeg Jr.

On December 10, 1904, a meeting of the loyal Nu Phis was held at Fogarty's home at 90 Broad Street to establish a new fraternity. There were seven men in attendance at the meeting: Kroeg, Fogarty, Mixson, Anthony Pelzer Wagener, Thomas F. Mosimann, Theodore ("Teddy") Barnwell Kelley, and James Fogarty (Simon's younger brother). All of the original members were students at the college and had grown up together in Charleston.

Wagener, who was a student of Greek and Latin, recommended the letters Pi Kappa Phi and their secret meaning as the official new name of the group. Simon proposed the design of the fraternity's pin, a black enamel diamond with the Greek letters ΠΚΦ engraved in gold with a star and lamp as additional elements. Kroeg was selected as the new chapter's first president, which was termed "Archon", from the Greek term. He then began work on a constitution for chapter. The group quickly set out to recruit new members to its ranks.

On December 10, 1905, the first anniversary of the fraternity's founding, Mixson's mother cooked the men a special dinner in her home to celebrate a successful first year as a fraternity. The fraternity celebrate that date as "Founders Day" with a dinner or a similar ceremony. In 1906 Mixson and Wagener wrote the fraternity's initiation ritual as the "highest ideals of Christian manhood".

=== Expansion ===
That same year, the group was offered a charter from another U.S. fraternity. Instead, they chose to expand and create more Pi Kappa Phi chapters. A second chapter Beta chapter, was formed at Presbyterian College on March 9, 1907. Due to a state law banning fraternities at state supported schools, Presbyterian College and the College of Charleston were the only two South Carolina schools where fraternities were allowed. A third chapter was formed at the University of California, Berkeley, Gamma chapter, which was the first chapter of the Fraternity to obtain a house.

Kroeg developed "Articles of Incorporation" and the name Pi Kappa Phi became legally registered in the state of South Carolina on December 23, 1907.

The interest in Pi Kappa Phi within South Carolina was growing despite laws and policies banning fraternities. In 1909, Delta chapter at Furman University formed and operated in secret until state laws changed, allowing fraternal organizations. In 1910, a charter was granted to Sigma chapter at the University of South Carolina and the chapter was operated as the Sigma Club due to the laws banning fraternities.

In modern times, the fraternity is largely considered to be a "southern fraternity," as many of its more notable alumni and chapters are located in the southern states, however the fraternity is expanding and has a growing presence in the northeast, at schools such as Sacred Heart University, the University of Connecticut, the University of New Hampshire, and the University of Maine.

=== The Star and Lamp ===
The Pi Kappa Phi Fraternity Journal was begun in 1909, with Henry Wagener as editor. In 1911, the name was changed to The Star and Lamp.

== Chapters ==
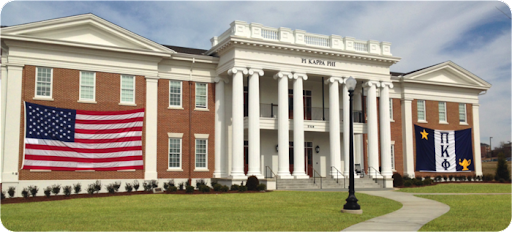
Omicron chapter at the University of Alabama

Pi Kappa Phi has granted 231 charters, with an average chapter size of 55. There are 168 active chartered chapters plus 19 associate chapters (colonies).

== Notable members ==
As of 2013 Pi Kappa Phi reports having over 113,000 members.

== Local chapter and member misconduct ==
In 2000, the California State University, Chico chapter was dissolved and later permanently banned after the alcohol-related hazing death of freshman student Adrian Heideman. In response to Heideman's death the national chapter created an alcohol-awareness video for distribution to all members, "The Choice Is Yours."

In September 2013, the Gamma Gamma chapter at Troy University allegedly took a group of pledges out to the local woods, tied them to trees, and subsequently hazed them. They were discovered early that morning by police on the side of the road. As a result, the chapter was suspended and six students faced disciplinary action from the university. The chapter has since been reinstated.

In December 2013, two Pi Kappa Phi members were arrested and charged with harassment at the University of Tennessee at Knoxville. The fraternity members were retaliating against a former pledge who reported to school officials physical and verbal abuse he experienced while he was seeking to join the fraternity.

A student pledging the California State University, Northridge chapter of Pi Kappa Phi died in the summer of 2014 during a mandatory 18-mile hike in what his family alleges was a hazing ritual. Nineteen-year-old Armando Villa died during the trip to the Angeles National Forest. Villa's family reported that other boys on the hike said they were "left barefoot with very little water to share between the boys, and no cellphones, and to find their way out of the forest." In September 2014, the University announced that the national and local chapters of the Pi Kappa Phi fraternity voted to withdraw permanently from the university. The fraternity is being sued by Villa's family.

An alleged pledge notebook of Pi Kappa Phi's North Carolina State University chapter was found in Raleigh. It contained numerous racist statements and comments about raping women and girls. The national organization placed the chapter on an interim suspension. NCSU suspended all social events at the chapter that involved alcohol.

After the death of University of Missouri freshman Jack Lipp at a Pi Kappa Phi fraternity rush party in December 2014, his parents settled for $5 million with the property owner and future developers of the site. The lawsuit, initially filed for negligence in repairing a broken railing, alleged that the property owner was aware of the insecure railing before Lipp's fatal fall. Despite complaints about the balcony's safety, repairs were not scheduled as the property was slated for demolition. The incident occurred during an out-of-control rush party at Pi Kappa Phi fraternity, leading to Lipp's death.

In 2016, four fraternity members at Radford University were arrested for hazing pledges.

In 2016, the fraternity at the University of South Florida (USF) was suspended after a sixteen year old girl was raped while she was unconscious in the fraternity's house. The girl was visiting the campus and decided to attend the fraternity's house party. A fraternity member confessed to the rape and was arrested. A few months prior to the rape incident at USF, another rape allegation involving the fraternity at Purdue University was reported to the campus police department

In 2017, the Alpha Chapter of the fraternity at the College of Charleston was closed by the university following an investigation into conduct violations. The College of Charleston stated that its investigation concerned incidents involving alcohol, drugs, and hazing. The chapter's university recognition was revoked, and it was not eligible for reinstatement until the fall 2019 semester. The university's action followed several incidents reported during the 2016–17 academic year. In August 2017, a former College of Charleston student filed a civil lawsuit against Pi Kappa Phi and its members alleging that he had been assaulted following an initiation party in April 2017. The lawsuit was separate from the university's disciplinary investigation. They returned to campus and were reinstated in the fall of 2019.

In November 2017, a Florida State University student named Andrew Coffey was found unresponsive the morning after an unaffiliated off-campus house party. Coffey, a Pi Kappa Phi fraternity pledge, was given medical treatment in an attempt to resuscitate, but died soon thereafter. After his death, FSU suspended all 58 fraternities and sororities on campus, and banned alcohol from student events.

In 2019, several members of the fraternity at Texas State University brutally attacked a fellow student they mistakenly assumed was a member of their rival fraternity on campus Phi Kappa Psi, leaving him with a fractured skull and a traumatic brain injury. As a result, the fraternity was placed on suspension, some members faced criminal charges, and the attacked student filed a lawsuit against the fraternity.

In 2021, the chapter at Virginia Tech was removed from campus and lost its national charter after it was determined they were guilty of alcoholic beverage and other policy violations, and causing upwards of $18,000 worth of damage to their on-campus fraternity house.

On February 11, 2022, members of the Beta Chapter of the fraternity at Presbyterian College were involved in what the school's president called "racist, misogynistic, and hateful behaviors" before a women's lacrosse game vs. Howard University, a HBCU, at the college. After a three month independent investigation, several students were expelled and the fraternity was permanently removed from campus.

In 2024, three members of the chapter at the University of Alabama were arrested after multiple reports of hazing came out against the fraternity. Among the allegations, students pledging the fraternity alleged they were "forced to their hands and knees as part of the fraternity’s 'Rules Night,'" and "While on their hands and knees, pledges were yelled at, stepped on, pushed, had items thrown at them, and had beer poured on them." Furthermore, additional video has shown they were forced to "perform forced calisthenics, including wall sits and push-ups."

In 2025, the chapter at the University of Houston was shut down for hazing. Also a former pledge filed a $10 million lawsuit against the fraternity for serious physical injuries and psychological abuse. In his lawsuit it states he was pressured to complete grueling workouts, eat food to the point of vomiting, sleep deprivation, late-night driving of fraternity members, and simulated waterboarding with a garden hose.

== See also ==
- List of social fraternities and sororities
