= 1989 Cleveland Browns season =

44th season in franchise history

- Owner: Art Modell
- General manager: Ernie Accorsi
- Head coach: Bud Carson
- Offensive coordinator: Marc Trestman
- Defensive coordinator: Dan Radakovich
- Home stadium: Cleveland Municipal Stadium

Results
- Record: 9–6–1
- Division place: 1st AFC Central
- Playoffs: Won Divisional Playoffs (vs. Bills) 34–30; Lost AFC Championship (Note: The 1990 Conference Championship game between the Browns and the Broncos marked the third time in four years that John Elway defeated Bernie Kosar and the Browns in the AFC championship game.) (at Broncos) 21–37
- Pro Bowlers: WR Webster Slaughter; DT Michael Dean Perry; OLB Clay Matthews Jr. MLB Mike Johnson; CB Frank Minnifield

The 1989 Cleveland Browns season was the team's 40th season with the National Football League.

It was the Browns' first season with head coach Bud Carson, who had been the defensive coordinator of the New York Jets the previous season. The Browns finished with a 9–6–1 record, good enough for an AFC Central Division title. After a 34–30 victory over the Buffalo Bills in the Divisional Playoffs, the Browns reached their third AFC Championship Game in four seasons, (Note: The Browns had previously reached the AFC Championship Game following the 1986 and 1987 seasons.) and for the third time lost to the Denver Broncos. After two close contests, this time Denver won by a comfortable margin of 37–21.

It would be the Browns' fifth consecutive season making the playoffs, but it would prove their last until 1994. The team has not won a division title since this season, the longest active drought in the NFL. As of 2026, this is their most recent appearance in the AFC Championship Game.

== Offseason ==
=== NFL draft ===
1989 Cleveland Browns draft
Round	Pick	Player	Position	College	Notes
1	13	Eric Metcalf *	Running back	Texas	
Made roster * Made at least one Pro Bowl during career

== Personnel ==
=== Staff ===
1989 Cleveland Browns staff
Front office: Owner and president – Art Modell; Executive vice-president of football operations – Ernie Accorsi; Director of pro personnel – Michael Lombardi; Head coaches: Head coach – Bud Carson; Offensive coaches: Offensive coordinator/quarterbacks – Marc Trestman; Running backs – George Sefcik; Receivers – Richard Mann; Special assistant–offense/tight ends – Lionel Taylor; Offensive line – Hal Hunter	Defensive coaches: Defensive coordinator/linebackers – Dan Radakovich; Defensive line – John Teerlinck; Secondary – Jed Hughes; Special teams coaches: Special teams coordinator – Paul Lanham; Strength and conditioning: Strength and conditioning – Stan Jones

=== Roster ===
1989 Cleveland Browns roster
Quarterbacks (QB): 19 Bernie Kosar; 10 Mike Pagel; Running backs (RB): 26 Keith Jones; 34 Kevin Mack; 42 Tim Manoa FB; 21 Eric Metcalf KR; 33 Mike Oliphant; 35 Barry Redden; Wide receivers (WR): 86 Brian Brennan; 88 Reggie Langhorne; 89 Gerald McNeil PR; 84 Webster Slaughter; 85 Lawyer Tillman; Tight ends (TE): 87 Ron Middleton; 82 Ozzie Newsome	Offensive linemen (OL): 68 Ted Banker G; 64 Tom Baugh; 77 Rickey Bolden T; 74 Paul Farren T; 66 Tony Jones T; 73 Gregg Rakoczy C; 63 Cody Risien T; 72 Kevin Robbins T; 70 Kevin Simons T; Defensive linemen (DL): 60 Al Baker DE; 97 Robert Banks DE; 71 Tom Gibson DE; 78 Carl Hairston DT; 92 Michael Dean Perry DT; 75 Chris Pike DT; 96 Andrew Stewart DE	Linebackers (LB): 58 Clifford Charlton OLB; 56 Dave Grayson OLB; 51 Eddie Johnson ILB; 59 Mike Johnson ILB; 57 Clay Matthews OLB; 50 Van Waiters OLB; Defensive backs (DB): 24 Anthony Blaylock CB; 29 Hanford Dixon CB; 30 Thane Gash FS; 23 Mark Harper CB; 40 Kyle Kramer FS; 49 Robert Lyons SS; 31 Frank Minnifield CB; 22 Felix Wright SS; Special teams (ST): 9 Matt Bahr K; 15 Bryan Wagner P	Practice squad: 27 Derrick Gainer RB; 12 Jeff Graham QB; 62 Ben Jefferson G; 80 Vernon Joines WR; 54 Kerry Owens LB; Reserve: 36 Stephen Braggs CB (IR); 69 Dan Fike G (IR); 79 Mike Graybill T (IR); 93 Lee Jones DT (IR); 95 Marlon Jones DE (IR); 99 Darryl Sims DT (IR); -- Wilbur Strozier G (IR); 47 active, 7 inactive, 5 practice squad Rookies in italics

== Schedule ==
Week	Date	Opponent	Result	Record	Venue	Attendance
1	September 10	at **Pittsburgh Steelers**	**W** 51–0	1–0	Three Rivers Stadium	57,928
2	September 17	New York Jets	**W** 38–24	2–0	Cleveland Municipal Stadium	73,516
3	September 25	at **Cincinnati Bengals**	**L** 14–21	2–1	Riverfront Stadium	55,996
4	October 1	Denver Broncos	**W** 16–13	3–1	Cleveland Municipal Stadium	78,637
5	October 8	at Miami Dolphins	**L** 10–13 OT	3–2	Joe Robbie Stadium	58,444
6	October 15	**Pittsburgh Steelers**	**L** 7–17	3–3	Cleveland Municipal Stadium	78,840
7	October 23	Chicago Bears	**W** 27–7	4–3	Cleveland Municipal Stadium	78,722
8	October 29	**Houston Oilers**	**W** 28–17	5–3	Cleveland Municipal Stadium	78,765
9	November 5	at Tampa Bay Buccaneers	**W** 42–31	6–3	Tampa Stadium	69,162
10	November 12	at Seattle Seahawks	**W** 17–7	7–3	Kingdome	58,978
11	November 19	Kansas City Chiefs	**T** 10–10 (OT)	7–3–1	Cleveland Municipal Stadium	77,922
12	November 23	at Detroit Lions	**L** 10–13	7–4–1	Pontiac Silverdome	65,624
13	December 3	**Cincinnati Bengals**	**L** 0–21	7–5–1	Cleveland Municipal Stadium	76,236
14	December 10	at Indianapolis Colts	**L** 17–23 (OT)	7–6–1	Hoosier Dome	58,550
15	December 17	Minnesota Vikings	**W** 23–17 OT	8–6–1	Cleveland Municipal Stadium	70,777
16	December 23	at **Houston Oilers**	**W** 24–20	9–6–1	Houston Astrodome	58,852
Note: Intra-division opponents are in **bold** text.

== Game summaries ==
=== Week 1 ===
Cleveland Browns (0–0) at Pittsburgh Steelers (0–0)

Quarter	1	2	3	4	Total
Browns	17	13	14	7	51
Steelers	0	0	0	0	0

at Three Rivers Stadium • Pittsburgh, Pennsylvania

- Date: September 10
- Game time: 4:00 p.m. EST
- Game weather: Rain • 73 °F or 22.8 °C • Wind 9 miles per hour (14 km/h; 7.8 kn)
- Game attendance: 57,928
- Referee: Johnny Grier
- TV announcers (NBC): Tom Hammond and Joe Namath
- Pro-Football-Reference.com, The Football Database

Game information

Browns

- Bernie Kosar
  16/25, 207 Yds
- Mike Oliphant
  6 Rush, 48 Yds, TD
- Webster Slaughter
  4 Rec, 75 Yds

Steelers

- Bubby Brister
  10/22, 84 Yds, 3 INT
- Tim Worley
  10 Rush, 36 Yds
- Derek Hill
  2 Rec, 28 Yds

Bud Carson begins his Browns head coaching career with a memorable 51–0 victory over the Steelers in Pittsburgh. Carson, Pittsburgh's former defensive coordinator, watches his team force eight turnovers, record seven sacks and score three touchdowns (two by linebacker David Grayson).

Scoring summary

Quarter	Time	Drive			Team	Scoring information	Score	
Quarter	Time	Plays	Yards	TOP	Team	Scoring information	CLE	PIT
1	5:42				Browns	Fumble recovery returned 3 yards for touchdown by Matthews, Bahr kick good	7	0
1	2:53				Browns	27-yard field goal by Bahr	10	0
1	2:31				Browns	Fumble recovery returned 28 yards for touchdown by Grayson, Bahr kick good	17	0
2	8:54				Browns	20-yard field goal by Bahr	20	0
2	3:28				Browns	Manoa 3-yard touchdown run, Bahr kick good	27	0
2	0:39				Browns	27-yard field goal by Bahr	30	0
3	12:26				Browns	Manoa 2-yard touchdown run, Bahr kick good	37	0
3	11:14				Browns	Interception returned 14 yards for touchdown by Grayson, Bahr kick good	44	0
4	11:34				Browns	Oliphant 21-yard touchdown run, Bahr kick good		
"TOP" = time of possession. For other American football terms, see Glossary of American football.							51	0

=== Week 2 ===
Team	1	2	3	4	Total
Jets	0	7	10	7	24
• Browns	0	14	14	10	38

- Date: September 17
- Location: Cleveland Municipal Stadium
- Referee: Dale Hamer
- TV announcers (NBC): Marv Albert and Bob Trumpy

Scoring summary
Q2	11:46	NYJ	Vick 39 yard run (Leahy kick)	NYJ 7–0
Q2	6:01	CLE	Slaughter 35 yard pass from Kosar (Bahr kick)	Tie 7–7
Q2	4:54	CLE	Gash 36 yard interception return (Bahr kick)	CLE 14–7
Q3	11:25	NYJ	Townsell 49 yard pass from O'Brien (Leahy kick)	Tie 14–14
Q3	8:27	CLE	Manoa 6 yard pass from Kosar (Bahr kick)	CLE 21–14
Q3	7:18	NYJ	Leahy 36 yard field goal	CLE 21–17
Q3	4:09	CLE	Jones 9 yard run (Bahr kick)	CLE 28–17
Q4	12:06	NYJ	McNeil 1 yard run (Leahy kick)	CLE 28–24
Q4	7:53	CLE	Newsome 4 yard pass from Kosar (Bahr kick)	CLE 35–24
Q4	2:12	CLE	Bahr 21 yard field goal	CLE 38–24

=== Week 4 ===
The Browns snap a 10-game losing streak against Denver with a controversial 16–13 win at Cleveland Municipal Stadium. The game was decided by a Matt Bahr 48-yard field goal as time expired – a kick that barely made the crossbar. Bahr's field goal comes after referee Tom Dooley ordered the teams to switch ends of the field, thanks to rowdy Dawg Pound fans who pelt the Broncos with dog biscuits, eggs and other debris. The switch gave the Browns a timely wind advantage.

=== Week 7 ===
Wide receiver Webster Slaughter catches eight passes for 186 yards in leading the Browns to a 27–7 win over the Chicago Bears on ABC's Monday Night Football at Cleveland Municipal Stadium. One of the catches is a 96-yard touchdown pass from Kosar – the longest play from scrimmage in Browns history.

=== Week 8 ===
For the first time in more than a decade Ozzie Newsome did not catch a pass, but the Browns still beat Houston, 28–17. The Browns explode for 326 second-half yards as Kosar throws touchdown passes of 80 and 77 yards to Slaughter. Newsome's club record streak of 150 consecutive games with a reception ends.

==== Week 9: at Tampa Bay Buccaneers ====
Week 9: Tampa Bay Buccaneers vs. Cleveland Browns

Quarter	1	2	3	4	Total
Browns	7	28	0	7	42
Buccaneers	7	10	7	7	31

at Tampa Stadium, Tampa, Florida

- Date: November 5, 1989
- Game time: 1:00 p.m. CST
- Game weather: Overcast, 85 °F (29 °C)
- TV announcers (NBC): Tom Hammond and Joe Namath

Game information

First quarter

Second quarter

Third quarter

Fourth quarter

Top passers

- TAM – Vinny Testaverde – 27/50, 370 yards, 2 TD, 4 INT
- CLE – Bernie Kosar – 18/22, 164 yards, 3 TD

Top rushers

- TAM – James Wilder – 6 rushes, 23 yards
- CLE – Eric Metcalf – 17 rushes, 87 yards, 1 TD

Top receivers

- TAM – James Wilder – 8 receptions, 107 yards, 2 TD
- CLE – Eric Metcalf – 7 receptions, 52 yards, 1 TD

This marked the Browns' last win over the Buccaneers in Tampa Bay until 2026.

=== Week 11 ===
Former coach Marty Schottenheimer, returning to Cleveland with his Chiefs, has to settle for a 10–10 tie as Kansas City kicker Nick Lowery misses three makeable field goal attempts: 45- and 39- yard attempts In the final 10 seconds of regulation and a 47-yard attempt with seven seconds left in overtime. The Browns fumble four times, throw one interception and punt a club-record-tying 12 times. This was the first Browns' tie since the introduction of overtime in regular season games in 1974. The Browns would not record another tie until week 1 of the 2018 season.

==== Week 12: at Detroit Lions ====
Week 12: Cleveland Browns at Detroit Lions – Game summary

Quarter	1	2	3	4	Total
Browns	0	10	0	0	10
Lions	0	10	3	0	13

at Pontiac Silverdome, Pontiac, Michigan

- Date: November 23, 1989
- Game time: 12:30 p.m. EDT
- Game attendance: 65,624
- TV announcers (NBC): Dick Enberg and Bill Walsh
- Box score

Game information

First quarter

- No scoring plays

Second quarter

- DET – Eddie Murray 39-yard field goal, 12:31. Detroit 3–0 Drive: 8 plays, 30 yards, 3:20.
- CLE – Matt Bahr 35-yard field goal, 7:33. Tied 3–3 Drive: 10 plays, 60 yards, 4:58.
- DET – Richard Johnson 27-yard pass from Bob Gagliano, 3:21. Detroit 10–3 Drive: 7 plays, 67 yards, 4:12
- CLE – Barry Redden 38-yard rush (Matt Bahr kick good), 1:07. Tied 10–10 Drive: 8 plays, 94 yards, 2:14.

Third quarter

- DET – Eddie Murray 35-yard field goal, 3:43. Detroit 13–10 Drive: 10 plays, 48 yards, 3:45.

Fourth quarter

- No scoring plays

Top passers

- CLE – Bernie Kosar – 28/38, 296 yards, INT
- DET – Bob Gagliano – 9/19, 143 yards, TD

Top receivers

- CLE – Reggie Langhorne – 5 receptions, 72 yards
- DET – Richard Johnson – 3 receptions, 57 yards, TD

Top rushers

- CLE – Barry Redden – 1 rush, 38 yards, TD
- DET – Barry Sanders – 28 rushes, 145 yards

=== Week 16 ===
With the AFC Central title and a wild-card berth at stake, the Browns blow a 17-point lead before bouncing back to defeat the Oilers, 24–20 at the Astrodome. The Browns march 58 yards with no timeouts and Kevin Mack scores on a 4-yard touchdown run with 39 seconds left to save the day.

(Note: This excludes the three seasons from 1996 to 1998 when the Browns franchise was inactive.) With the win, Cleveland clinched the AFC Central and finished 9–6–1. However, as of 2025, this would be the last the Browns would clinch their division. Since then, they have gone 36 years without clinching a division title, which currently stands as the longest active drought in the NFL.

== Postseason ==
Round	Date	Opponent (seed)	Result	Record	Venue	Recap
Divisional	January 6, 1990	Buffalo Bills (3)	W 34–30	Cleveland Municipal Stadium	77,706	Recap
AFC Championship	January 14, 1990	at Denver Broncos (1)	L 21–37	Mile High Stadium	76,005	Recap

=== AFC divisional playoff ===
Buffalo Bills (9–7) at Cleveland Browns (9–6–1)

Cleveland Browns 34, Buffalo Bills 30

Quarter	1	2	3	4	Total
Bills	7	7	7	9	30
Browns	3	14	14	3	34

at Cleveland Stadium, Cleveland, Ohio

- Game time: Saturday, January 6, 1990. 12:30 p.m. EST
- Game attendance: 77,706
- Referee: Dick Jorgensen
- TV announcers (NBC): Charlie Jones and Merlin Olsen

In a shootout, 33-year-old Browns linebacker Clay Matthews intercepted Bills quarterback Jim Kelly at the Cleveland 1-yard line with three seconds left to preserve a 34–30 victory. Kelly threw for 405 yards and four touchdowns while Browns quarterback Bernie Kosar threw for 251 yards and three touchdowns with no interceptions. Browns receiver Webster Slaughter had the best postseason performance of his career with three receptions for 114 yards and two touchdowns.

The game was played on a cold icy field that would have a big impact on the game. The Browns took their first drive into Bills territory but came up empty when Matt Bahr slipped while planting his foot on a 45-yard field goal attempt. On Buffalo's second play after the missed kick, Kelly threw a short pass to Andre Reed. Felix Wright slipped while going into coverage, leaving Reed wide open and he ended up taking the ball 72 yards to the end zone. But Cleveland struck back with an 18-yard completion from Kosar to Slaughter on the first play after the kickoff, which led to a 45-yard field goal by Bahr. Then after a punt, the Browns drove 79 yards and scored on a 52-yard touchdown pass from Kosar to Slaughter in the second quarter. Buffalo receiver Don Beebe returned the ensuing kickoff 32 yards to the 34-yard line. On the next play, Kelly completed a 21-yard pass to James Lofton. The Bills were on the move and did not stop until Kelly finished the drive with a 33-yard touchdown pass to Lofton that put the Bills back in the lead, 14–10. With less than 5 minutes left in the second quarter, the Browns took advantage of a short 34-yard punt by John Kidd that gave them the ball on their o9-yard line. Fullback Kevin Mack carried the ball 4 times for 31 yards as the team drove to retake the lead with Ron Middleton's 3-yard touchdown catch shortly before the end of the first half.[5] Buffalo responded with a drive to the Browns 40-yard line. But on a 4th and 1 conversion attempt, Cleveland defensive end Carl Hairston sacked Kelly to force a turnover on downs.

On the second drive of the second half, the first turnover of the game occurred when Mark Harper intercepted a pass from Kelly on the Cleveland 46. Kosar then hooked up with Slaughter for another touchdown pass, this one 44 yards, to increase their lead to 24–14. The Bills gave the ball up again on their next drive when Larry Kinnebrew lost a fumble that was recovered on the Browns 25-yard line by defensive back Felix Wright. But on the next play, they took it back as Fred Smerlas forced a fumble from Mack that was recovered by Bills safety Mark Kelso on the 26. A few plays later on 3rd and 8, Kelly completed a 15-yard pass to running back Thurman Thomas on the Browns 4-yard line, setting up his 6-yard touchdown pass to Thomas to make the score 24–21. But Browns running back Eric Metcalf returned the ensuing kickoff 90 yards for a touchdown to give his team a 31–21 lead by the end of the third quarter.

Buffalo responded by driving 67 yards, including a 27-yard completion from Kelly to Thomas, to score on Scott Norwood's 30-yard field goal, cutting their deficit to 31–24. Cleveland struck back with a 51-yard drive to score a field goal of their own, a 46-yard kick by Bahr, retaking their two-score lead at 34–24 with 6:57 left in the game. Buffalo then drove 77 yards entirely on receptions by Thomas and fellow running back Ronnie Harmon, who hauled in a 22-yard catch on the Browns 3-yard line. On the next play, Kelly's 3-yard touchdown pass to Thomas cut their deficit to 34–30 with 3:56 left in regulation. But Scott Norwood slipped on an icy patch of the field while attempting the extra point, forcing the Bills to attempt to score a touchdown instead of a field goal on their final drive. After Buffalo's defense forced the Browns to go three-and-out, Kelly led the Bills to Cleveland's 11-yard line, converting two fourth downs on the way there. But Harmon dropped a potential game-winning catch in the end zone [6] and Kelly was intercepted by Matthews on the next play.

Metcalf finished with 169 all-purpose yards. Thomas set a playoff record with 13 receptions for 150 yards and 2 touchdowns, while also rushing for 27 yards.

This was the first postseason meeting between the Bills and Browns.[3] As of 2025, this remains the Browns last win in the AFC Divisional Round. Since then, Cleveland has held the longest Conference Championship appearance in the NFL at 36 years.

== Standings ==
AFC Central
	W	L	T	PCT	DIV	CONF	PF	PA	STK
^{(2)} Cleveland Browns	9	6	1	.594	3–3	6–5–1	334	254	W2
^{(4)} Houston Oilers	9	7	0	.563	3–3	6–6	365	412	L2
^{(5)} Pittsburgh Steelers	9	7	0	.563	1–5	6–6	265	326	W3
Cincinnati Bengals	8	8	0	.500	5–1	6–6	404	285	L1
