= 1989–90 NFL playoffs =

American football tournament

- Dates: December 31, 1989–January 28, 1990
- Season: 1989
- Teams: 10
- Games played: 9
- Super Bowl XXIV site: Louisiana Superdome; New Orleans, Louisiana
- Defending champions: San Francisco 49ers
- Champion: San Francisco 49ers (4th title)
- Runner-up: Denver Broncos
- Conference runners-up: Cleveland Browns; Los Angeles Rams
NFL playoffs
| ← 1988–89 | 1990–91 → |

The National Football League playoffs for the 1989 season began on December 31, 1989. The postseason tournament concluded with the San Francisco 49ers defeating the Denver Broncos in Super Bowl XXIV, 55–10, on January 28, 1990, at the Louisiana Superdome in New Orleans, Louisiana.

This was the last season in which the NFL used a 10-team playoff format. The league would expand the playoffs to 12 teams next season. This is also the last time in which two teams from the same division could not face each other in the Divisional Round.

This season featured only three teams that failed to make the previous season's postseason. The New York Giants, who were eliminated on the final day of the 1988 season, rebounded to win a division title, while the Denver Broncos and Pittsburgh Steelers recovered from disappointing seasons.

This postseason marked the last time the Rams were in the postseason while residing in Los Angeles until 2017.

== Participants ==
Within each conference, the three division winners and the two non-division winners with the best overall regular season records qualified for the playoffs. The NFL did not use a fixed-bracket playoff system. The three division winners were seeded 1–3 based on their overall won-lost-tied record, and received a first-round bye while the wild card teams were seeded 4 and 5, and played in the first round, dubbed the wild-card playoffs or wild-card weekend, with the 4 seed hosting. The second round, the divisional playoffs, had a restriction where two teams from the same division could not meet: the surviving wild card team visited the division champion outside its division that had the higher seed, and the remaining two teams from that conference played each other. The two surviving teams from each conference's divisional playoff games then met in the respective AFC and NFC Conference Championship games, hosted by the higher seed. Finally the Super Bowl, the championship round of the playoffs, was played at a neutral site, with the designated home team based on an annual rotation by conference.

Playoff seeds
| Seed | AFC | NFC |
|---|---|---|
| 1 | Denver Broncos (West winner) | San Francisco 49ers (West winner) |
| 2 | Cleveland Browns (Central winner) | New York Giants (East winner) |
| 3 | Buffalo Bills (East winner) | Minnesota Vikings (Central winner) |
| 4 | Houston Oilers (wild card) | Philadelphia Eagles (wild card) |
| 5 | Pittsburgh Steelers (wild card) | Los Angeles Rams (wild card) |

== Bracket ==
Note: The San Francisco 49ers (the NFC 1 seed) did not play the Los Angeles Rams (the 5 seed) in the Divisional playoff round because both teams were in the same division.

Jan 7 – Giants Stadium
5 | LA Rams | 19*
Dec 31 – Veterans Stadium | Jan. 14 – Candlestick Park
2 | NY Giants | 13
NFC
5 | LA Rams | 21 | 5 | LA Rams | 3
Jan 6 – Candlestick Park
4 | Philadelphia | 7 | 1 | San Francisco | 30
NFC Championship
3 | Minnesota | 13
Jan 28 – Louisiana Superdome
1 | San Francisco | 41
Divisional round
Wild-card round | N1 | San Francisco | 55
Jan 6 – Cleveland Stadium
A1 | Denver | 10
Super Bowl XXIV
3 | Buffalo | 30
Dec 31 – Astrodome | Jan. 14 – Mile High Stadium
2 | Cleveland | 34
AFC
5 | Pittsburgh | 26* | 2 | Cleveland | 21
Jan 7 – Mile High Stadium
4 | Houston | 23 | 1 | Denver | 37
AFC Championship
5 | Pittsburgh | 23
1 | Denver | 24

* Indicates overtime victory

== Schedule ==
The starting times for the Conference Championship Games were changed from the then-customary 12:30 p.m. and 4:00 p.m. EST to 1:30 p.m. and 5:00 p.m. EST. This was to accommodate the fact that the Denver Broncos and San Francisco 49ers hosted the AFC and NFC Championship Games in the Mountain Time Zone and Pacific Time Zone, respectively—thus avoiding a locally played game at 9:30 a.m. PST or 10:30 a.m. MST. The NFL would keep this format heading forward to avoid any further scheduling conflicts.

In the United States, NBC broadcast the AFC playoff games, while CBS televised the NFC games and Super Bowl XXIV.

| Round | Away team | Score | Home team | Date | Kickoff (ET / UTC−5) | TV |
|---|---|---|---|---|---|---|
| Wild-card round | Los Angeles Rams | 21–7 | Philadelphia Eagles | December 31, 1989 | 12:30 p.m. | CBS |
| Wild-card round | Pittsburgh Steelers | 26–23 (OT) | Houston Oilers | December 31, 1989 | 4:00 p.m. | NBC |
| Divisional round | Buffalo Bills | 30–34 | Cleveland Browns | January 6, 1990 | 12:30 p.m. | NBC |
| Divisional round | Los Angeles Rams | 19–13 (OT) | New York Giants | January 6, 1990 | 4:00 p.m. | CBS |
| Divisional round | Minnesota Vikings | 13–41 | San Francisco 49ers | January 7, 1990 | 12:30 p.m. | CBS |
| Divisional round | Pittsburgh Steelers | 23–24 | Denver Broncos | January 7, 1990 | 4:00 p.m. | NBC |
| Conference championships | Cleveland Browns | 21–37 | Denver Broncos | January 14, 1990 | 1:30 p.m. | NBC |
| Conference championships | Los Angeles Rams | 3–30 | San Francisco 49ers | January 14, 1990 | 5:00 p.m. | CBS |
| Super Bowl XXIV Louisiana Superdome New Orleans, Louisiana | San Francisco 49ers | 55–10 | Denver Broncos | January 28, 1990 | 5:00 p.m. | CBS |

== Wild-card round ==
=== Sunday, December 31, 1989 ===
==== NFC: Los Angeles Rams 21, Philadelphia Eagles 7 ====
Los Angeles Rams vs. Philadelphia Eagles – Game summary

| Quarter | 1 | 2 | 3 | 4 | Total |
|---|---|---|---|---|---|
| Rams | 14 | 0 | 0 | 7 | 21 |
| Eagles | 0 | 0 | 0 | 7 | 7 |

at Veterans Stadium, Philadelphia, Pennsylvania

- Game time: 12:30 p.m. EST
- Game attendance: 65,479
- Referee: Gordon McCarter
- TV announcers (CBS): Pat Summerall (play-by-play) and John Madden (color commentator)

Game information

First quarter

- RAMS – Henry Ellard 39-yard pass from Jim Everett (Mike Lansford kick). Rams 7–0.
- RAMS – Damone Johnson 4-yard pass from Jim Everett (Mike Lansford kick). Rams 14–0.

Second quarter

- No scoring plays.

Third quarter

- No scoring plays.

Fourth quarter

- PHI – Anthony Toney 1-yard run (Roger Ruzek kick). Rams 14–7.
- RAMS – Greg Bell 7-yard run (Mike Lansford kick). Rams 21–7.

Top passers

- RAMS – Jim Everett – 18/33, 281 yards, 2 TD, 2 INT
- PHI – Randall Cunningham – 24/40, 238 yards, INT

Top rushers

- RAMS – Greg Bell – 27 rushes, 124 yards, TD
- PHI – Heath Sherman – 9 rushes, 44 yards

Top receivers

- RAMS – Henry Ellard – 4 receptions, 87 yards, TD
- PHI – Keith Byars – 9 receptions, 68 yards

The Rams outgained the Eagles in total yards 409 to 306 and jumped to a 14-0 first half lead of the way to their first playoff win in four years.

LA scored on the opening drive, moving the ball 83 yards in five plays. Jim Everett finished the drive with a long pass to receiver Henry Ellard, who outjumped Izel Jenkins for the ball and raced 39 yards to the end zone. The next time the Rams had the ball, Everett's 30-yard completion to Ellard set up his 4-yard touchdown pass to tight end Damone Johnson, giving the team a 14–0 lead less than eight minutes into the game. By the end of the first quarter, Everett had completed 7/11 passes for 173 yards, and at the end of the first half, the Eagles had a mere 77 total yards and three first downs. However, the Rams would blow several scoring chances that enabled the Eagles to stay in the game: Greg Bell lost a fumble on the Philadelphia 4-yard line, Everett threw an interception to Jenkins from the Eagles 25, and kicker Mike Lansford missed a 47-yard field goal.

Philadelphia's offense made a major improvement in the second half (229 yards and 11 first downs), but they would not score until 10:38 remained in the fourth quarter when fullback Anthony Toney capped an 80-yard drive with a 1-yard touchdown run, cutting the score to 14–7. Eagles linebacker Seth Joyner then picked off a pass from Everett on the Philadelphia 30-yard line, giving the team a great chance to drive for the tying score. But they ended up punting at the end of an ugly series in which Heath Sherman fumbled after an 11-yard run (recovered by receiver Cris Carter), Randall Cunningham fumbled a snap (he recovered it), and then threw two incompletions. Los Angeles subsequently put the game away with an 84-yard, 7-play scoring drive. Everett kept it going on third and 5 with a 15-yard completion to running back Buford McGee, and then Bell took off for a 54-yard burst two plays later, moving the ball to the Eagles 10-yard line. Eventually, he finished the drive with a 7-yard touchdown run, making the final score 21–7.

"This year we wanted nothing short of the Super Bowl", said Eagles defensive tackle Mike Golic. "To lose the first game, a lot of people are going to be seriously bummed out for a long time. I'm disgusted."

Everett completed 18 of 33 passes for 281 yards and two touchdowns, with two interceptions. Ellard caught four passes for 87 yards and a score. Bell rushed for 124 yards and a touchdown, while also catching a 23-yard pass. Linebacker Kevin Greene had five tackles, two sacks, and a fumble recovery. Cunningham completed 24 of 40 passes for 238 yards with an interception, and rushed for 39 yards. Fullback Keith Byars was the Eagles top receiver with nine receptions for 68 yards.

This was the second postseason meeting between the Rams and Eagles. Philadelphia won the only previous meeting.

Previous playoff games
Philadelphia leads 1–0 in all-time playoff games

1949

Philadelphia Eagles 14 @ Los Angeles Rams 0

1949 NFL Championship Game

==== AFC: Pittsburgh Steelers 26, Houston Oilers 23 (OT) ====
Pittsburgh Steelers vs. Houston Oilers – Game summary

| Quarter | 1 | 2 | 3 | 4 | OT | Total |
|---|---|---|---|---|---|---|
| Steelers | 7 | 3 | 3 | 10 | 3 | 26 |
| Oilers | 0 | 6 | 3 | 14 | 0 | 23 |

at Astrodome, Houston, Texas

- Game time: 4:00 p.m. EST/3:00 p.m. CST
- Game attendance: 59,406
- Referee: Pat Haggerty
- TV announcers (NBC): Marv Albert (play-by-play) and Bob Trumpy (color commentator)

Game information

First quarter

- PIT – Tim Worley 9-yard run (Gary Anderson kick). Steelers 7–0.

Second quarter

- HOU – Tony Zendejas 26-yard field goal. Steelers 7–3.
- HOU – Tony Zendejas 35-yard field goal. Steelers 7–6.
- PIT – Gary Anderson 25-yard field goal. Steelers 10–6.

Third quarter

- HOU – Tony Zendejas 26-yard field goal. Steelers 10–9.
- PIT – Gary Anderson 30-yard field goal. Steelers 13–9.

Fourth quarter

- PIT – Gary Anderson 48-yard field goal. Steelers 16–9.
- HOU – Ernest Givins 18-yard pass from Warren Moon (Tony Zendejas kick). Tied 16–16.
- HOU – Ernest Givins 9-yard pass from Warren Moon (Tony Zendejas kick). Oilers 23–16.
- PIT – Merril Hoge 2-yard run (Gary Anderson kick). Tied 23–23.

Overtime

- PIT – Gary Anderson 50-yard field goal. Steelers 26–23.

Top passers

- PIT – Bubby Brister – 15/33, 127 yards
- HOU – Warren Moon – 29/48, 315 yards, 2 TD

Top rushers

- PIT – Merril Hoge – 17 rushes, 100 yards, TD
- HOU – Allen Pinkett – 12 rushes, 41 yards

Top receivers

- PIT – Mike Mularkey – 3 receptions, 40 yards
- HOU – Ernest Givins – 11 receptions, 136 yards, 2 TD

Pittsburgh cornerback Rod Woodson recovered a fumble to set up Gary Anderson's winning 50-yard field goal in overtime to give Pittsburgh the win.

Houston took the opening kickoff and drove to the Steelers 40-yard line, but were stopped there and Tony Zendejas missed a 55-yard field goal. Later in the quarter, Steelers rookie Jerry Olsavsky blocked a punt from Greg Montgomery and Pittsburgh recovered on the Oilers 23. Eventually facing fourth and 1 on the Houston 9-yard line, Steelers coach Chuck Noll decided to go for the first down. This paid off as running back Tim Worley took a pitch and ran all the way to the end zone, evading linebacker Robert Lyles and plowing right through safety Bubba McDowell on the way to a 7–0 Steelers lead with 2:36 left in the first quarter.

Houston responded on their next drive, moving the ball 96 yards to the Steelers 3-yard line, but could go no further and settled for a 26-yard Zendejas field goal. Then McDowell recovered a fumble from Worley on the Pittsburgh 41. From there the Oilers advanced to the 17-yard line, but when faced with fourth and 1 they decided to settle for another Zendejas field goal, cutting the score to 7–6. Pittsburgh struck back with a drive to the Oilers 9, featured a 49-yard run by Merril Hoge. However, they also ended up facing fourth and 1, and would settle for an Anderson field goal to put them up 10–6 going into halftime.

The field goal battle continued in the third quarter, with Zendejas kicking one more and Anderson adding another two, making the score 16–9 at the start of the fourth quarter. But quarterback Warren Moon finally got his team to the end zone with a 10-play, 80-yard drive to score on his 18-yard touchdown pass to Ernest Givins that tied the game. Following a Pittsburgh three-and-out, Harry Newsome's punt went just 25 yards to the Steelers 38-yard line. From there it took just five plays for Houston to take their first lead of the game, scoring on Moon's 9-yard pass touchdown pass to Givins that put them up 23–16 with 5:16 left in regulation. Starting from their own 18 after the kickoff, Pittsburgh drove 82 yards, featuring a 22-yard run by receiver Dwight Stone (the only time he touched the ball all game) on a reverse play, to score on Hoge's 2-yard touchdown run with 46 seconds left, tying the game and sending it into overtime.

Pittsburgh won the coin toss and received the ball first, but were quickly forced to punt, and another short kick from Newsome gave Houston the ball with great field position on the Steelers 45-yard line. On the Oilers first play, Moon handed the ball off to Lorenzo White, who was quickly leveled by Woodson and defensive end Tim Johnson, causing a fumble that Woodson recovered and returned four yards to the Oilers 46. From there, Pittsburgh could gain just 13 yards with a few Hoge carries before facing a fourth down. But it was enough for Anderson to kick a 50-yard field goal, his longest attempt of the season, which he sent perfectly through the uprights to give the Steelers the win.

Hoge finished the game with 100 rushing yards on just 17 carries, along with three receptions for 26 yards. Moon threw for 315 yards and two touchdowns. Givins caught 11 passes for 136 yards. Pittsburgh won despite being outgained in total yards 380–289. Oilers coach Jerry Glanville was fired a few days after this game. This was a particularly satisfying win for the Steelers, who had started the season with a 51–0 loss to Cleveland and a 41–10 loss to Cincinnati. They had been shutout three times, outgained by their opponents in ten consecutive games, and had to recover from a 4–6 record to get into the playoffs by winning five of their last six games.

This was the third postseason meeting between the Steelers and Oilers. Pittsburgh won both previous meetings.

Previous playoff games
Pittsburgh leads 2–0 in all-time playoff games

1978

Houston Oilers 5 @ Pittsburgh Steelers 34

1978 AFC Championship Game

1979

Houston Oilers 13 @ Pittsburgh Steelers 27

1979 AFC Championship Game

== Divisional round ==
=== Saturday, January 6, 1990 ===
==== AFC: Cleveland Browns 34, Buffalo Bills 30 ====
Buffalo Bills vs. Cleveland Browns – Game summary

| Quarter | 1 | 2 | 3 | 4 | Total |
|---|---|---|---|---|---|
| Bills | 7 | 7 | 7 | 9 | 30 |
| Browns | 3 | 14 | 14 | 3 | 34 |

at Cleveland Stadium, Cleveland, Ohio

- Game time: 12:30 p.m. EST
- Game attendance: 77,706
- Referee: Dick Jorgensen
- TV announcers (NBC): Charlie Jones (play-by-play) and Merlin Olsen (color commentator)

Game information

First quarter

- BUF – Andre Reed 72-yard pass from Jim Kelly (Scott Norwood kick). Bills 7–0.
- CLE – Matt Bahr 45-yard field goal. Bills 7–3.

Second quarter

- CLE – Webster Slaughter 52-yard pass from Bernie Kosar (Matt Bahr kick). Browns 10–7.
- BUF – James Lofton 33-yard pass from Jim Kelly (Scott Norwood kick). Bills 14–10.
- CLE – Ron Middleton 3-yard pass from Bernie Kosar (Matt Bahr kick). Browns 17–14.

Third quarter

- CLE – Webster Slaughter 44-yard pass from Bernie Kosar (Matt Bahr kick). Browns 24–14.
- BUF – Thurman Thomas 6-yard pass from Jim Kelly (Scott Norwood kick). Browns 24–21.
- CLE – Eric Metcalf 90-yard kickoff return (Matt Bahr kick). Browns 31–21.

Fourth quarter

- BUF – Scott Norwood 30-yard field goal. Browns 31–24.
- CLE – Matt Bahr 47-yard field goal. Browns 34–24.
- BUF – Thurman Thomas 3-yard pass from Jim Kelly (kick failed). Browns 34–30.

Top passers

- BUF – Jim Kelly – 28/54, 405 yards, 4 TD, 2 INT
- CLE – Bernie Kosar – 20/29, 251 yards, 3 TD

Top rushers

- BUF – Thurman Thomas – 10 rushes, 27 yards
- CLE – Kevin Mack – 12 rushes, 62 yards

Top receivers

- BUF – Thurman Thomas – 13 receptions, 150 yards, 2 TD
- CLE – Webster Slaughter – 5 receptions, 114 yards, 2 TD

In a shootout, 33-year-old Browns linebacker Clay Matthews intercepted Bills quarterback Jim Kelly at the Cleveland 1-yard line with three seconds left to preserve a 34–30 victory. Kelly threw for 405 yards and four touchdowns while Browns quarterback Bernie Kosar threw for 251 yards and three touchdowns with no interceptions. Browns receiver Webster Slaughter had the best postseason performance of his career with three receptions for 114 yards and two touchdowns.

The game was played on a cold icy field that would have a big impact on the game. The Browns took their first drive into Bills territory, but came up empty when Matt Bahr slipped while planting his foot on a 45-yard field goal attempt. On Buffalo's second play after the missed kick, Kelly threw a short pass to Andre Reed. Felix Wright slipped while going into coverage, leaving Reed wide open and he ended up taking the ball 72 yards to the end zone. But Cleveland struck back with an 18-yard completion from Kosar to Slaughter on the first play after the kickoff, which led to a 45-yard field goal by Bahr. Then after a punt, the Browns drove 79 yards and scored on a 52-yard touchdown pass from Kosar to Slaughter in the second quarter. Buffalo receiver Don Beebe returned the ensuing kickoff 32 yards to the 34-yard line. On the next play, Kelly completed a 21-yard pass to James Lofton. The Bills were on the move and did not stop until Kelly finished the drive with a 33-yard touchdown pass to Lofton that put the Bills back in the lead, 14–10. With less than 5 minutes left in the second quarter, the Browns took advantage of a short 34-yard punt by John Kidd that gave them the ball on their own 49-yard line. Fullback Kevin Mack carried the ball 4 times for 31 yards as the team drove to retake the lead with Ron Middleton's 3-yard touchdown catch shortly before the end of the first half. Buffalo responded with a drive to the Browns 40-yard line. But on a 4th and 1 conversion attempt, Cleveland defensive end Carl Hairston sacked Kelly to force a turnover on downs.

On the second drive of the second half, the first turnover of the game occurred when Mark Harper intercepted a pass from Kelly on the Cleveland 46. Kosar then hooked up with Slaughter for another touchdown pass, this one 44-yards, to increase their lead to 24–14. The Bills gave the ball up again on their next drive when Larry Kinnebrew lost a fumble that was recovered on the Browns 25-yard line by defensive back Felix Wright. But on the next play, they took it back as Fred Smerlas forced a fumble from Mack that was recovered by Bills safety Mark Kelso on the 26. A few plays later on 3rd and 8, Kelly completed a 15-yard pass to running back Thurman Thomas on the Browns 4-yard line, setting up his 6-yard touchdown pass to Thomas to make the score 24–21. But Browns running back Eric Metcalf returned the ensuing kickoff 90 yards for a touchdown to give his team a 31–21 lead by the end of the third quarter.

Buffalo responded by driving 67 yards, including a 27-yard completion from Kelly to Thomas, to score on Scott Norwood's 30-yard field goal, cutting their deficit to 31–24. Cleveland struck back with a 51-yard drive to score a field goal of their own, a 46-yard kick by Bahr, retaking their two-score lead at 34–24 with 6:57 left in the game. Buffalo then drove 77 yards entirely on receptions by Thomas and fellow running back Ronnie Harmon, who hauled in a 22-yard catch on the Browns 3-yard line. On the next play, Kelly's 3-yard touchdown pass to Thomas cut their deficit to 34–30 with 3:56 left in regulation. But Scott Norwood slipped on an icy patch of the field while attempting the extra point, forcing the Bills to attempt to score a touchdown instead of a field goal on their final drive. After Buffalo's defense forced the Browns to go three-and-out, Kelly led the Bills to Cleveland's 11-yard line, converting two fourth downs on the way there. But Harmon dropped a potential game winning catch in the end zone and Kelly was intercepted by Matthews on the next play.

Metcalf finished with 169 all purpose yards. Thomas set a playoff record with 13 receptions for 150 yards and 2 touchdowns, while also rushing for 27 yards.

This was the first postseason meeting between the Bills and Browns.

==== NFC: San Francisco 49ers 41, Minnesota Vikings 13 ====
Minnesota Vikings vs. San Francisco 49ers – Game summary

| Quarter | 1 | 2 | 3 | 4 | Total |
|---|---|---|---|---|---|
| Vikings | 3 | 0 | 3 | 7 | 13 |
| 49ers | 7 | 20 | 0 | 14 | 41 |

at Candlestick Park, San Francisco, California

- Game time: 4:00 p.m. EST/1:00 p.m. PST
- Game attendance: 64,585
- Referee: Tom Dooley
- TV announcers (CBS): Verne Lundquist (play-by-play) and Terry Bradshaw (color commentator)

Game information

First quarter

- MIN – Rich Karlis 38-yard field goal. Vikings 3–0.
- SF – Jerry Rice 72-yard pass from Joe Montana (Mike Cofer kick). 49ers 7–3.

Second quarter

- SF – Brent Jones 8-yard pass from Joe Montana (Mike Cofer kick). 49ers 14–3.
- SF – John Taylor 8-yard pass from Joe Montana (kick failed). 49ers 20–3.
- SF – Jerry Rice 13-yard pass from Joe Montana (Mike Cofer kick). 49ers 27–3.

Third quarter

- MIN – Rich Karlis 44-yard field goal. 49ers 27–6.

Fourth quarter

- SF – Ronnie Lott 58-yard interception return (Mike Cofer kick). 49ers 34–6.
- SF – Roger Craig 4-yard run (Mike Cofer kick). 49ers 41–6.
- MIN – Rick Fenney 3-yard run (Rich Karlis kick). 49ers 41–13.

Top passers

- MIN – Rich Gannon – 13/18, 144 yards, INT
- SF – Joe Montana – 17/24, 241 yards, 4 TD

Top rushers

- MIN – Herschel Walker – 9 rushes, 29 yards
- SF – Roger Craig – 18 rushes, 125 yards, TD

Top receivers

- MIN – Steve Jordan – 9 receptions, 149 yards
- SF – Jerry Rice – 6 receptions, 114 yards, 2 TD

49ers quarterback Joe Montana threw for 241 yards and four touchdowns as San Francisco dominated the Vikings, gaining 403 total yards against a Minnesota defense that was ranked #1 in the league during all 16 weeks of the season and forcing five turnovers. Minnesota had led the NFL in sacks during the regular season with 72, but in this game Montana was not sacked at all.

Minnesota scored first on a 7.5 minute, 70-yard drive that ended with a 38-yard field goal by Rich Karlis, but then Montana completed four consecutive scores: a 72-yard touchdown pass to wide receiver Jerry Rice, an 8-yarder to tight end Brent Jones, an 8-yarder to wide receiver John Taylor, and a 13-yarder to Rice. In the fourth quarter, Ronnie Lott returned an interception 58 yards for a touchdown, and Tim McKyer's 41-yard interception return set up their final score on Roger Craig's 4-yard run. The 49ers could have had an even bigger lead, but Mike Cofer missed two fields goals from distances of 31 and 32 yards, along with an extra point, while Craig lost an early fumble on the Minnesota 9-yard line.

The Vikings defense had not allowed a 100-yard rusher all season, but Craig reached triple digits on his first carry of the second half, and finished the game with 125 rushing yards and a touchdown, while Rice caught six passes for 114 yards and two touchdowns. One of the few bright spots of the game for Minnesota was tight end Steve Jordan, who caught nine passes for 149 yards.

This was the fourth postseason meeting between the Vikings and 49ers. San Francisco won two of the previous three meetings.

Previous playoff games
San Francisco leads 2–1 in all-time playoff games

1970

San Francisco 49ers 17 @ Minnesota Vikings 14

1970 NFC Divisional playoffs

1987

Minnesota Vikings 36 @ San Francisco 49ers 24

1987 NFC Divisional playoffs

1988

Minnesota Vikings 9 @ San Francisco 49ers 34

1988 NFC Divisional playoffs

=== Sunday, January 7, 1990 ===
==== NFC: Los Angeles Rams 19, New York Giants 13 (OT) ====
Los Angeles Rams vs. New York Giants – Game summary

| Quarter | 1 | 2 | 3 | 4 | OT | Total |
|---|---|---|---|---|---|---|
| Rams | 0 | 7 | 0 | 6 | 6 | 19 |
| Giants | 6 | 0 | 7 | 0 | 0 | 13 |

at Giants Stadium, East Rutherford, New Jersey

- Game time: 12:30 p.m. EST
- Game attendance: 76,325
- Referee: Bob McElwee
- TV announcers (CBS): Pat Summerall (play-by-play) and John Madden (color commentator)

Game information

First quarter

- NYG – Raul Allegre 35-yard field goal. Giants 3–0.
- NYG – Raul Allegre 41-yard field goal. Giants 6–0.

Second quarter

- RAMS – Flipper Anderson 20-yard pass from Jim Everett (Mike Lansford kick). Rams 7–6.

Third quarter

- NYG – Ottis Anderson 2-yard run (Raul Allegre kick). Giants 13–7.

Fourth quarter

- RAMS – Mike Lansford 31-yard field goal. Giants 13–10.
- RAMS – Mike Lansford 22-yard field goal. Tied 13–13.

Overtime

- RAMS – Flipper Anderson 30-yard pass from Jim Everett. Rams 19–13.

Top passers

- RAMS – Jim Everett – 25/44, 315 yards, 2 TD, INT
- NYG – Phil Simms – 14/29, 180 yards, INT

Top rushers

- RAMS – Greg Bell – 19 rushes, 87 yards
- NYG – Ottis Anderson – 24 rushes, 120 yards, TD

Top receivers

- RAMS – Henry Ellard – 8 receptions, 125 yards
- NYG – Zeke Mowatt – 3 receptions, 52 yards

The Rams upset the Giants with quarterback Jim Everett's 30-yard touchdown pass to Flipper Anderson with 1:06 gone in overtime.

The Giants opened the game by moving into Rams' territory after one play. Their drive stalled inside the 20 and New York settled for a 35-yard field goal by Raúl Allegre. On the Rams' first drive of the game, Giants linebacker Lawrence Taylor forced a fumble while sacking Everett that Gary Reasons recovered for New York on the Giants 11-yard line. Allegre later kicked a second first quarter field goal to make the score 6–0, but in the second quarter, Giants quarterback Phil Simms threw a pass that was deflected by Jerry Gray and intercepted by safety Michael Stewart, who returned it 29 yards to the New York 20-yard line. On the next play, Everett threw a 20-yard touchdown pass to Anderson with just 17 seconds left in the half, giving the Rams a 7–6 halftime lead.

On the opening drive of the second half, Everett was intercepted in the end zone by Mark Collins. Later on, New York put together an 82-yard, 14-play drive to take the lead. Simms completed passes to Dave Meggett for 11 yards and Zeke Mowatt for 23, while running back Ottis Anderson rushed six times for 28 yards, including a 2-yard touchdown run to make the score 13–7 with two minutes remaining in the quarter. But LA stormed right back, with Everett completing two passes to Henry Ellard for gains of 23 and 16 yards, along with a 16-yard run by Greg Bell, on the way to a 31-yard field goal by Mike Lansford. Later in the quarter, Everett completed six of seven passes for 44 yards and rushed for 12 yards on a 75-yard drive that ended with Lansford's 21-yard field goal with 3:01 left, tying the score and sending the game into overtime.

After winning the coin toss, Los Angeles needed just one drive and 1:06 to win the game. Starting from their own 23-yard line, Everett's completions to tight end Pete Holohan and Ellard for gains of 12 and 13 yards moved the ball to the 48. On the next play, Sheldon White was called for a 27-yard pass interference penalty while trying to cover Anderson. Following a 5-yard false start penalty against the Rams, Everett connected with Anderson for a 30-yard touchdown completion.

Ellard had the best postseason performance of his career with eight receptions for 125 yards. Taylor had two sacks, while Anderson finished with 120 rushing yards. It proved to be the final playoff win for the Rams franchise before relocating to St. Louis in 1995, their last as a franchise until 1999, and their last playoff win as the LA Rams until the 2018 season.

This was the second postseason meeting between the Rams and Giants. New York won the only prior meeting.

Previous playoff games
New York leads 1–0 in all-time playoff games

1984

New York Giants 16 @ Los Angeles Rams 13

1984 NFC Wild Card playoffs

==== AFC: Denver Broncos 24, Pittsburgh Steelers 23 ====
Pittsburgh Steelers vs. Denver Broncos – Game summary

| Quarter | 1 | 2 | 3 | 4 | Total |
|---|---|---|---|---|---|
| Steelers | 3 | 14 | 3 | 3 | 23 |
| Broncos | 0 | 10 | 7 | 7 | 24 |

at Mile High Stadium, Denver, Colorado

- Game time: 4:00 p.m. EST/2:00 p.m. MST
- Game attendance: 75,868
- Referee: Gene Barth
- TV announcers (NBC): Dick Enberg (play-by-play) and Bill Walsh (color commentator)

Game information

First quarter

- PIT – Gary Anderson 32-yard field goal. Steelers 3–0.

Second quarter

- PIT – Merril Hoge 7-yard run (Gary Anderson kick). Steelers 10–0.
- DEN – Mel Bratton 1-yard run (David Treadwell kick). Steelers 10–7.
- PIT – Louis Lipps 9-yard pass from Bubby Brister (Gary Anderson kick). Steelers 17–7.
- DEN – David Treadwell 43-yard field goal. Steelers 17–10.

Third quarter

- DEN – Vance Johnson 37-yard pass from John Elway (David Treadwell kick). Tied 17–17.
- PIT – Gary Anderson 35-yard field goal. Steelers 20–17.

Fourth quarter

- PIT – Gary Anderson 32-yard field goal. Steelers 23–17.
- DEN – Mel Bratton 1-yard run (David Treadwell kick). Broncos 24–23.

Top passers

- PIT – Bubby Brister – 19/29, 229 yards, TD
- DEN – John Elway – 12/20, 239 yards, TD, INT

Top rushers

- PIT – Merril Hoge – 16 rushes, 120 yards, TD
- DEN – Bobby Humphrey – 18 rushes, 85 yards

Top receivers

- PIT – Merril Hoge – 8 receptions, 60 yards
- DEN – Mark Jackson – 5 receptions, 111 yards

The Broncos recovered from two early 10-point deficits to eventually win on a 71-yard drive that was capped by Mel Bratton's 1-yard touchdown run with 2:27 left in the game. For the second game in a row, Steelers running back Merril Hoge had a superb performance, rushing for 120 yards on 16 carries and catching eight passes for 60 yards. But this time it wasn't enough to lift his team to victory. Broncos receiver Mark Jackson caught five passes for 111 yards.

The Steelers jumped to an early 3–0 lead with a 32-yard field goal by Gary Anderson. On the first play of the second quarter, Hoge ripped off a 45-yard run, the longest of his career. He ended up rushing for 60 yards on the Steelers drive, including a 7-yard touchdown carry to increase the Steelers lead to 10–0. Denver responded with a 12-play, 75-yard drive to score on Bratton's 1-yard touchdown run, cutting the lead to 10–7. But the Steelers stormed right back, with Bubby Brister completing a 25-yard pass to tight end Mike Mularkey and rookie running back Tim Worley contributing a 19-yard carry on the way to a 9-yard scoring reception by Louis Lipps. Shortly before the end of the half, Broncos kicker David Treadwell made a 43-yard field goal, putting the score at 17-10 going into halftime.

In the third quarter, Broncos defenders Karl Mecklenburg and Greg Kragen forced a fumble from Worley that Tyrone Braxton recovered on the Steelers 37-yard line, setting up quarterback John Elway's 37-yard touchdown pass to wide receiver Vance Johnson to tie the game at 17. Brister struck back, completing a 19-yard screen to Hoge and a 30-yard pass to rookie receiver Mark Stock on the way to a 35-yard Anderson field goal. Then in the fourth quarter, Pittsburgh defensive back Thomas Everett intercepted an Elway pass and returned it 26 yards to midfield, setting up Anderson's 32-yard field goal to make the score 23–17. The Steelers appeared to have a big chance to put the game away following a Denver punt. But after a productive start to their drive, Braxton tackled Hodge 1-yard short of a first down at the Denver 41 to bring up fourth down and force a punt.

Now with seven minutes left in the game, Elway led the Broncos 71 yards in nine plays, including a 36-yard completion to Jackson and a 15-yarder to Ricky Nattiel. Bratton finished the drive with his second 1-yard touchdown of the game, this one with 2:27 left. This time, the Steelers had no ability to respond. On first down of their ensuring possession, Brister fired a pass to a wide open Stock, but he tried to turn upfield before securing the catch and it fell to the turf incomplete. Then after another incompletion, Brister fumbled a low snap from backup center Chuck Lanza (filling in for injured All-Pro center Dermontti Dawson) in shotgun formation, and Broncos safety Randy Robbins recovered the ball to secure the win.

Brister completed 19/29 passes for 224 yards and a touchdown. Elway threw for 239 yards and a touchdown, with one interception, and rushed for 44 yards.

This was the fourth postseason meeting between the Steelers and Broncos. Pittsburgh won two of the previous three meetings.

Previous playoff games
Pittsburgh leads 2–1 in all-time playoff games

1977

Pittsburgh Steelers 21 @ Denver Broncos 34

1977 AFC Divisional playoffs

1978

Denver Broncos 10 @ Pittsburgh Steelers 33

1978 AFC Divisional playoffs

1984

Pittsburgh Steelers 24 @ Denver Broncos 17

1984 AFC Divisional playoffs

== Conference championships ==
=== Sunday, January 14, 1990 ===
==== AFC: Denver Broncos 37, Cleveland Browns 21 ====
Cleveland Browns vs. Denver Broncos – Game summary

| Quarter | 1 | 2 | 3 | 4 | Total |
|---|---|---|---|---|---|
| Browns | 0 | 0 | 21 | 0 | 21 |
| Broncos | 3 | 7 | 14 | 13 | 37 |

at Mile High Stadium, Denver, Colorado

- Game time: 1:30 p.m. EST/11:30 a.m. MST
- Game attendance: 76,005
- Referee: Dick Hantak
- TV announcers (NBC): Dick Enberg (play-by-play) and Bill Walsh (color commentator)

Game information

First quarter

- DEN – David Treadwell 29-yard field goal. Broncos 3–0.
- DEN – Michael Young 70-yard pass from John Elway (David Treadwell kick). Broncos 10–0.

Second quarter

- CLE – Brian Brennan 27-yard pass from Bernie Kosar (Matt Bahr kick). Broncos 10–7.
- DEN – Orson Mobley 5-yard pass from John Elway (David Treadwell kick). Broncos 17–7.
- DEN – Sammy Winder 7-yard run (David Treadwell kick). Broncos 24–7.

Third quarter

- CLE – Brian Brennan 10-yard pass from Bernie Kosar (Matt Bahr kick). Broncos 24–14.
- CLE – Tim Manoa 2-yard run (Matt Bahr kick). Broncos 24–21.
- DEN – Sammy Winder 39-yard pass from John Elway (David Treadwell kick). Broncos 31–21.

Fourth quarter

- DEN – David Treadwell 34-yard field goal. Broncos 34–21.
- DEN – David Treadwell 31-yard field goal. Broncos 37–21.

Top passers

- CLE – Bernie Kosar – 19/44, 210 yards, 2 TD, 3 INT
- DEN – John Elway – 20/36, 385 yards, 3 TD

Top rushers

- CLE – Kevin Mack – 6 rushes, 36 yards
- DEN – Sammy Winder – 21 rushes, 37 yards

Top receivers

- CLE – Reggie Langhorne – 5 receptions, 78 yards
- DEN – Michael Young – 2 receptions, 123 yards, TD

Quarterback John Elway led the Broncos to a 37–21 victory with 385 passing yards and three touchdowns with no interceptions, while also leading the Broncos in rushing with 39 yards on the ground. Denver outgained Cleveland in total yards 497 to 256 and forced three turnovers.

Denver scored first with David Treadwell's 29-yard field goal, five plays after Broncos safety Dennis Smith intercepted a pass from Bernie Kosar on the Cleveland 35 with just over two minutes left in the first quarter. Then on their next drive, Frank Minnifield stumbled while trying to bump receiver Mike Young at the line of scrimmage, enabling Young to soar past him, catch a pass from Elway, and take off for a 70-yard touchdown reception that put Denver up 10–0 at the end of the half.

Cleveland struck back on their opening drive of the third quarter with a 79-yard, 8-play touchdown drive. Kosar had a 16-yard scramble on the possession, and eventually wrapped it up with a 27-yard touchdown pass to Brian Brennan, cutting the score to 10–7. However, Denver responded with a touchdown of their own, as Sammy Winder (filling in for injured starter Bobby Humphrey) rushed for 22 yards on the drive, while Elway completed a 53-yard pass to Young and finished it off with a 5-yard scoring pass to tight end Orson Mobley, putting the team back up by 10 points at 17–7. Later in the quarter, Cleveland defensive back Kyle Kramer was called for a 15-yard spearing penalty on Elway's 25-yard run, setting up Winder's 7-yard touchdown run that gave the Broncos a 24–7 lead with 4:19 left in the third quarter.

Now down by 17 points, Kosar desperately rallied the Browns back, completing passes to Reggie Langhorne, Lawyer Tillman, and Webster Slaughter for gains of 27, 15, and 16 yards. Then he connected with Brennan for a 10-yard touchdown completion that made the score 24–14. A few plays after the ensuing kickoff, defensive end Al Baker forced a fumble from Broncos running back Mel Bratton. Felix Wright recovered the ball and returned it 27 yards to the Denver 1-yard line, setting up Tim Manoa's 2-yard touchdown run and downing their deficit to 24-21 going into the fourth quarter.

However, Denver quickly eliminated Cleveland's comeback hopes with their opening drive of the fourth quarter. On the first play after the ensuing kickoff, Elway completed a 23-yard pass to Vance Johnson. Then on third and 10 from the Denver 43, he completed a 20-yard pass to Johnson, two plays before hooking up with Winder for a 39-yard touchdown completion. Denver then scored field goals on each of their next two drives to put the game away.

Young finished the game with 123 yards and a touchdown on just two receptions. Johnson had seven catches for 93 yards. This was the third time in the last four years Denver defeated Cleveland in the AFC Championship Game. To date, this is Cleveland's most recent appearance in an AFC Championship game.

This was the third postseason meeting between the Browns and Broncos. Denver won both prior meetings.

Previous playoff games
Denver leads 3–0 in all-time playoff games

1986

Denver Broncos 23 @ Cleveland Browns 20 (OT)

1986 AFC Championship Game

1987

Cleveland Browns 33 @ Denver Broncos 38

1987 AFC Championship Game

==== NFC: San Francisco 49ers 30, Los Angeles Rams 3 ====
Los Angeles Rams vs. San Francisco 49ers – Game summary

| Quarter | 1 | 2 | 3 | 4 | Total |
|---|---|---|---|---|---|
| Rams | 3 | 0 | 0 | 0 | 3 |
| 49ers | 0 | 21 | 3 | 6 | 30 |

at Candlestick Park, San Francisco, California

- Game time: 5:00 p.m. EST/2:00 p.m. PST
- Game attendance: 64,769
- Referee: Jerry Markbreit
- TV announcers (CBS): Pat Summerall (play-by-play) and John Madden (color commentator)

Game information

First quarter

- RAMS – Mike Lansford 23-yard field goal. Rams 3–0.

Second quarter

- SF – Brent Jones 20-yard pass from Joe Montana (Mike Cofer kick). 49ers 7–3.
- SF – Roger Craig 1-yard run (Mike Cofer kick). 49ers 14–3.
- SF – John Taylor 18-yard pass from Joe Montana (Mike Cofer kick). 49ers 21–3.

Third quarter

- SF – Mike Cofer 28-yard field goal. 49ers 24–3.

Fourth quarter

- SF – Mike Cofer 36-yard field goal. 49ers 27–3.
- SF – Mike Cofer 25-yard field goal. 49ers 30–3.

Top passers

- RAMS – Jim Everett – 16/36, 141 yards, 3 INT
- SF – Joe Montana – 26/30, 262 yards, 2 TD

Top rushers

- RAMS – Greg Bell – 8 rushes, 20 yards
- SF – Roger Craig – 24 rushes, 94 yards, TD

Top receivers

- RAMS – Buford McGee – 7 receptions, 53 yards
- SF – Jerry Rice – 6 receptions, 55 yards

The Rams had split their two games with San Francisco during the season, and only a dramatic comeback by San Francisco on a Monday night game had prevented LA from sweeping the series. But in this game, the 49ers crushed the Rams with 442 total yards and held the ball for 39:48. LA finished the game with just 156 yards, with only 26 on the ground, and quarterback Jim Everett, who threw for 4,310 yards and 29 touchdowns during the season, completed only 16 of 36 passes for 141 yards and was intercepted three times. His dual threat receiving tandem of Flipper Anderson and Henry Ellard was nullified as they combined for just three receptions for 32 yards. Everett was reportedly "shellshocked" from the numerous times he was sacked and hit, reaching a low point in the game on a play in which he fell down in the pocket in anticipation of a sack before any San Francisco defenders reached him (infamously known as Everett's "Phantom Sack"). This would haunt him for the rest of his career, and eventually bring him into an infamous televised confrontation with Jim Rome.

Los Angeles took advantage of a 31-yard punt by Barry Helton that gave them a first down at midfield, driving to the 6 in 10 plays and scoring on Mike Lansford's 23-yard field goal. However, this would be their only score, and Helton would punt only once more during the game. They soon got another chance to score when 49ers tight end Brent Jones lost a fumble. Guard Guy McIntyre picked up the ball, but then fumbled it as well, and the ball was recovered by linebacker Larry Kelm. While the Rams had momentum at this point, it shifted to San Francisco's favor for good when safety Ronnie Lott batted down a pass intended for a wide open Anderson. Had Anderson made the catch, he would have scored easily, giving the Rams a 10–0 lead. Instead, the Rams ended up punting, and San Francisco stormed down the field on a 13-play, 89-yard scoring drive. Montana completed 5/6 passes for 67 yards on the possession, the last one a 20-yard touchdown completion to Jones 3:33 into the second quarter.

On LA's ensuing drive, Everett threw a pass that bounced off Ellard and Don Griffin before being intercepted by Tim McKyer, who returned the ball 27 yards to the Rams 27-yard line. Five plays later, Roger Craig increased the 49ers lead to 14–3 with a 1-yard touchdown run. Then after a Rams punt, Montana completed eight of 10 passes for 90 yards on a 14-play, 87-yard drive (which involved overcoming a 15-yard personal foul call against center Jesse Sapolu) to score on an 18-yard touchdown completion to John Taylor with nine seconds left in the half.

An 11-play, 62-yard drive that ended with a 28-yard Mike Cofer field goal increased the 49ers lead to 24–3 early in the third quarter. Cofer later missed a field goal after Lott picked off an Everett pass, but made a 36-yarder on the first play of the fourth quarter, and a 25-yard kick with 5:40 left in the game to make the final score 30–3.

Montana showed much precision and finished the game completing 26 of 30 passes for 262 yards and two touchdowns. Fullback Tom Rathman rushed for 63 yards and caught six passes for 48 yards. Craig was the top rusher of the game with 94 yards and a touchdown, while also catching three passes for 40 yards.

The Rams did not qualify for the playoffs again in their original tenure in Los Angeles. After moving to St. Louis in 1995, it would take until 1999 for the Rams to return to the playoffs. After making the playoffs several times in St. Louis, most recently in 2004, the Rams again underwent a long playoff drought that extended into their first season back in Los Angeles in 2015.

This was the first postseason meeting between the Rams and 49ers as well as the second NFL playoff matchup between two California-based teams, following the Oakland Raiders' victory over the San Diego Chargers in the 1980 AFC Championship Game. As of 2024, there have since been two other all-California playoff matchups: the 49ers' 49–26 victory over the Chargers in Super Bowl XXIX; and the only other Rams-49ers playoff meeting, a 20–17 Rams victory in the 2021 NFC Championship Game, which the 2021 Rams, like the 1989 49ers, followed up with a Super Bowl victory.

== Super Bowl XXIV: San Francisco 49ers 55, Denver Broncos 10 ==
Super Bowl XXIV – San Francisco 49ers vs. Denver Broncos – Game summary

| Quarter | 1 | 2 | 3 | 4 | Total |
|---|---|---|---|---|---|
| 49ers (NFC) | 13 | 14 | 14 | 14 | 55 |
| Broncos (AFC) | 3 | 0 | 7 | 0 | 10 |

at Louisiana Superdome, New Orleans, Louisiana

- Date: January 28, 1990
- Game attendance: 72,919
- Referee: Dick Jorgensen
- TV announcers (CBS): Pat Summerall (play-by-play) and John Madden (color commentator)

This was the first Super Bowl meeting between the 49ers and Broncos.
