= 1989 Pittsburgh Steelers season =

Pittsburgh Steelers 57th US football season

- Owner: The Rooney Family
- General manager: Dick Haley
- Head coach: Chuck Noll
- Offensive coordinator: Tom Moore
- Defensive coordinator: Rod Rust
- Home stadium: Three Rivers Stadium

Results
- Record: 9–7
- Division place: 3rd AFC Central
- Playoffs: Won Wild Card Playoffs (at Oilers) 26–23 (OT); Lost Divisional Playoffs (at Broncos) 23–24
- All-Pros: Rod Woodson (1st team)
- Pro Bowlers: 2: OT Tunch Ilkin; CB Rod Woodson
- Team MVP: Louis Lipps
- Team ROY: Carnell Lake

The 1989 Pittsburgh Steelers season was the franchise's 57th season as a professional sports franchise and as a member of the National Football League. They were considered a rebuilding team filled with many young players, especially after the release of longtime center Mike Webster in the offseason. The young team showed its inexperience in the first game of the season, when they lost at home to the archrival Cleveland Browns 51–0. The loss marked the Steelers worst defeat in franchise history. The following week wasn't much better, losing 41–10 to another division rival, the defending AFC Champion Cincinnati Bengals.

However, the Steelers clinched the final playoff spot in the last week in the season with a 9–7 record. Chuck Noll, in his 21st season as the team's head coach, was named the NFL's Coach of the Year for the only time in his coaching career.

In the first round of the playoffs, the Steelers would have a memorable come-from-behind overtime victory over the division-rival Houston Oilers 26–23, which saw Gary Anderson kick a game-winning, 50-yard field goal in the extra period. The following week, the Steelers nearly pulled off a major upset against the Denver Broncos at Mile High Stadium before losing 24–23 on a Melvin Bratton one-yard touchdown run with 2:22 remaining in the game.

Though the Steelers would not make the playoffs again under Chuck Noll (missing in 1990 with an identical 9–7 record and again in 1991 at 7–9 despite a second-place finish that year), the season did set the tone for the team's return to prominence in the 1990s under his successor, Bill Cowher.

== Offseason ==
=== NFL draft ===
1989 Pittsburgh Steelers draft
Round	Pick	Player	Position	College	Notes
1	7	Tim Worley	Running back	Georgia	
1	24	Tom Ricketts	Tackle	Pittsburgh	from Minnesota
2	34	Carnell Lake *	Safety	UCLA	
3	61	Derek Hill	Wide receiver	Arizona	
4	91	Jerrol Williams	Linebacker	Purdue	
5	118	David Arnold	Cornerback	Michigan	
6	144	Mark Stock	Wide receiver	VMI	
7	174	D. J. Johnson	Cornerback	Kentucky	
8	201	Chris Asbeck	Defensive tackle	Cincinnati	
9	228	A. J. Jenkins	Defensive end	Cal State Fullerton	
10	258	Jerry Olsavsky	Linebacker	Pittsburgh	
11	285	Brian Slater	Wide receiver	Washington	
12	312	Carlton Haselrig *	Guard	Pittsburgh–Johnstown	
Made roster * Made at least one Pro Bowl during career

=== Undrafted free agents ===
1989 undrafted free agents of note
Player	Position	College
Owen Bartruff	Safety	Florida
Lester Brinkley	Defensive end	Ole Miss
Cammie Collins	Linebacker	Jackson State
Gene Cullinane	Center	Washburn
Charles Fryar	Cornerback	Nebraska
Fred Highsmith	Running back	Miami (FL)
Alvin Johnson	Wide receiver	Central Missouri State
Bob Kovach	Guard	West Virginia
John O'Neill	Tackle	Miami (FL)
Terry O'Shea	Tight end	California (PA)
Thane Ritchie	Tight end	Wheaton
Tracy Simien	Linebacker	TCU
John Stroia	Tackle	West Virginia
Fine Unga	Running back	Weber State
Steve Vandegrift	Nose tackle	Missouri
Eric Wilkerson	Running back	Kent State

== Personnel ==
=== Staff / Coaches ===
1989 Pittsburgh Steelers staff
Front office: President – Daniel M. Rooney; Vice president – John R. McGinley; Vice president – Arthur J. Rooney, Jr.; Director of communications & business – Joe Gordon; Controller – Ralph Meacham; Chief negotiator – James A. Boston; Office manager – Stadium – Dan Ferens; Public relations director – Dan Edwards; Publicity director – Pat Hanlon; Director of ticket sales – Geraldine Glenn; Computer coordinator – Accounting – Jim Ellenberger; Director of player personnel – Dick Haley; Director of pro personnel & development – Tom Donahoe; College scouting coordinator – Tom Modrak; Talent scout – Bob Schmitz; Talent scout – Max McCartney; Talent scout – Charles Bailey; Head coaches: Head coach – Chuck Noll; Offensive coaches: Offensive coordinator – Tom Moore; Offensive backfield – Dick Hoak; Receivers – Dwain Painter; Offensive line – Ron Blackledge	Defensive coaches: Defensive coordinator – Rod Rust; Defensive line – Joe Greene; Linebackers – Dave Brazil; Defensive backs – John Fox; Special teams coaches: Special teams coach – George Stewart; Strength and conditioning: Conditioning & training coordinator – Jon Kolb; Dentist – Dr. George P. Boucek; Ophthalmologist – Dr. Phillip Buzzelli; Physician, orthopedic – Dr. Thomas W. Cowan; Neurological surgery consultant – Dr. Joseph C. Maroon; Physician, M.D. – Dr. Richard Rydze; Physician, consultant – Dr. Abraham J.Twerski; Physician, M.D. – Dr. Anthony P. Yates; Trainer – Ralph Berlin; Trainer – Fran Feld; Equipment manager – Anthony Parisi; Field manager – Rodgers Freyvogel; Video & film director – Bob McCartney; Video assistant – Pat Dolan; Photographers – Mike Fabus, Bill Amatucci

=== Roster ===
1989 Pittsburgh Steelers roster
Quarterbacks (QB): 14 Todd Blackledge; 6 Bubby Brister; 11 Rick Strom; Running backs (RB): 33 Merril Hoge FB; 23 Tim Tyrrell; 40 Eric Wilkerson; 38 Tim Worley; Wide receivers (WR): 82 Derek Hill; 88 Jason Johnson; 83 Louis Lipps; 80 Mark Stock; 20 Dwight Stone; 87 Weegie Thompson; Tight ends (TE): 84 Mike Mularkey; 85 Terry O'Shea	Offensive linemen (OL): 60 Brian Blankenship G; 63 Dermontti Dawson C; 62 Tunch Ilkin T; 65 John Jackson T; 51 Chuck Lanza C; 74 Terry Long G; 71 Tom Ricketts G; 79 John Rienstra G; 73 Craig Wolfley T; Defensive linemen (DL): 68 Lorenzo Freeman NT; 78 Tim Johnson DE; 97 Aaron Jones DE; 98 Gerald Williams NT; 93 Keith Willis DE	Linebackers (LB): 53 Bryan Hinkle OLB; 99 A.J. Jenkins OLB; 50 David Little ILB; 95 Greg Lloyd OLB; 54 Hardy Nickerson ILB; 92 Jerry Olsavsky ILB; 90 Tyronne Stowe ILB; 91 Jerrol Williams OLB; Defensive backs (DB): 25 David Arnold CB; 27 Thomas Everett FS; 22 Larry Griffin SS; 35 Delton Hall CB; 44 D. J. Johnson CB; 37 Carnell Lake SS; 49 Dwayne Woodruff CB; 26 Rod Woodson CB; Special teams (ST): 1 Gary Anderson K; 18 Harry Newsome P	Practice squad: 77 Carlton Haselrig NT; 45 Tracy Simien LB; Reserve: 24 Rodney Carter RB (IR); 56 Vinson Smith LB (IR); 43 Ray Wallace RB (IR); 42 Warren Williams RB (IR); Rookies in italics 47 active, 4 reserve, 2 practice squad

== Offseason ==
The offseason was marked with the team deciding not to renew the contract of longtime center Mike Webster. Webster's release marked the end of the Super Bowl-era players on the team. Although Dwayne Woodruff was still with the Steelers and had won a Super Bowl ring during his rookie year, Webster had been the last member on the team that won all four Super Bowls. Webster would be succeeded at center with a young Dermontti Dawson, who was drafted the year before to be groomed as Webster's replacement, and like Webster would go on to an All-Pro career as one of the best at his position.

Meanwhile, the team drafted UCLA safety Carnell Lake in the second round of the 1989 draft. Lake would be a key member of the team's defense through the 1998 season, although his accomplishments would often be underlooked as opposed to his teammate, Rod Woodson.

== Preseason ==
=== Schedule ===
Week	Date	Opponent	Game Site	Kickoff (ET)	TV	Result	Record
1	Sat. Aug. 12	Washington Redskins	Three Rivers Stadium	8:00 p.m.	ESPN	L 21–14	0–1
2	Sat. Aug. 19	at Cleveland Browns	Cleveland Municipal Stadium	7:30 p.m.	WTAE	W 24–21	1–1
3	Sat. Aug. 26	at Philadelphia Eagles	Veterans Stadium	7:30 p.m.	WTAE	L 38–14	1–2
4	Sat. Sep. 2	at New York Giants	Giants Stadium	8:00 p.m.	WTAE	W 13–10	2–2

== Regular season ==
=== Schedule ===
Week	Date	Opponent	Game Site	Kickoff (ET)	TV	Result	Record
1	Sun. Sep. 10	Cleveland Browns	Three Rivers Stadium	4:00 p.m.	NBC	L 51–0	0–1
2	Sun. Sep. 17	at Cincinnati Bengals	Riverfront Stadium	1:00 p.m.	NBC	L 41–10	0–2
3	Sun. Sep. 24	Minnesota Vikings	Three Rivers Stadium	1:00 p.m.	CBS	W 27–14	1–2
4	Sun. Oct. 1	at Detroit Lions	Pontiac Silverdome	1:00 p.m.	NBC	W 23–3	2–2
5	Sun. Oct. 8	Cincinnati Bengals	Three Rivers Stadium	1:00 p.m.	NBC	L 26–16	2–3
6	Sun. Oct. 15	at Cleveland Browns	Cleveland Municipal Stadium	4:00 p.m.	NBC	W 17–7	3–3
7	Sun. Oct. 22	at Houston Oilers	Astrodome	1:00 p.m.	NBC	L 27–0	3–4
8	Sun. Oct. 29	Kansas City Chiefs	Three Rivers Stadium	1:00 p.m.	NBC	W 23–17	4–4
9	Sun. Nov. 5	at Denver Broncos	Mile High Stadium	4:00 p.m.	NBC	L 34–7	4–5
10	Sun. Nov. 12	Chicago Bears	Three Rivers Stadium	1:00 p.m.	CBS	L 20–0	4–6
11	Sun. Nov. 19	San Diego Chargers	Three Rivers Stadium	1:00 p.m.	NBC	W 20–17	5–6
12	Sun. Nov. 26	at Miami Dolphins	Joe Robbie Stadium	1:00 p.m.	NBC	W 34–14	6–6
13	Sun. Dec. 3	Houston Oilers	Three Rivers Stadium	1:00 p.m.	NBC	L 23–16	6–7
14	Sun. Dec. 10	at New York Jets	Giants Stadium	1:00 p.m.	NBC	W 13–0	7–7
15	Sun. Dec. 17	New England Patriots	Three Rivers Stadium	1:00 p.m.	NBC	W 28–10	8–7
16	Sun. Dec. 24	at Tampa Bay Buccaneers	Tampa Stadium	1:00 p.m.	NBC	W 31–22	9–7

=== Game summaries ===
==== Week 1 ====
Cleveland Browns (0–0) at Pittsburgh Steelers (0–0)

Quarter	1	2	3	4	Total
Browns	17	13	14	7	51
Steelers	0	0	0	0	0

at Three Rivers Stadium • Pittsburgh, Pennsylvania

- Date: September 10
- Game time: 4:00 p.m. EST
- Game weather: Rain • 73 °F (23 °C) • Wind 9 mph (14 km/h)
- Game attendance: 57,928
- Referee: Johnny Grier
- TV announcers (NBC): Tom Hammond and Joe Namath
- Pro-Football-Reference.com, The Football Database

Game information

Browns

- Bernie Kosar
  16/25, 207 Yds
- Mike Oliphant
  6 Rush, 48 Yds, TD
- Webster Slaughter
  4 Rec, 75 Yds

Steelers

- Bubby Brister
  10/22, 84 Yds, 3 INT
- Tim Worley
  10 Rush, 36 Yds
- Derek Hill
  2 Rec, 28 Yds

The Steelers and Chuck Noll faced off against their divisional rival Browns and former defensive coordinator Bud Carson in the season opener.

Scoring summary

Quarter	Time	Drive			Team	Scoring information	Score	
Quarter	Time	Plays	Yards	TOP	Team	Scoring information	CLE	PIT
1	5:42				Browns	Fumble recovery returned 3 yards for touchdown by Matthews, Bahr kick good	7	0
1	2:53				Browns	27-yard field goal by Bahr	10	0
1	2:31				Browns	Fumble recovery returned 28 yards for touchdown by Grayson, Bahr kick good	17	0
2	8:54				Browns	20-yard field goal by Bahr	20	0
2	3:28				Browns	Manoa 3-yard touchdown run, Bahr kick good	27	0
2	0:39				Browns	27-yard field goal by Bahr	30	0
3	12:26				Browns	Manoa 2-yard touchdown run, Bahr kick good	37	0
3	11:14				Browns	Interception returned 14 yards for touchdown by Grayson, Bahr kick good	44	0
4	11:34				Browns	Oliphant 21-yard touchdown run, Bahr kick good		
"TOP" = time of possession. For other American football terms, see Glossary of American football.							51	0

==== Week 2 (Sunday September 17, 1989): at Cincinnati Bengals ====
	1	2	3	4	Total
Steelers	3	0	7	0	10
Bengals	3	17	7	14	41

at Riverfront Stadium, Cincinnati

- Game time: 1:00 pm EDT
- Game weather:
- Game attendance: 53,885
- Referee: Dick Jorgensen
- TV announcers: (NBC) Don Criqui (play by play), Ahmad Rashad (color commentator)

Scoring drives:

- Cincinnati – FG Gallery 26
- Pittsburgh – FG Anderson 38
- Cincinnati – Brown 27 pass from Esiason (Gallery kick)
- Cincinnati – FG Gallery 47
- Cincinnati – Woods 1 run (Gallery kick)
- Pittsburgh – Hill 7 pass from Brister (Anderson kick)
- CIncinnati – Jennings 1 run (Gallery kick)
- CIncinnati – Brooks 2 run (Gallery kick)
- Cincinnati – Jennings 43 pass from Esiason (Gallery kick)

==== Week 3 (Sunday September 24, 1989): vs. Minnesota Vikings ====
	1	2	3	4	Total
Vikings	7	7	0	0	14
Steelers	7	14	0	6	27

at Three Rivers Stadium, Pittsburgh, Pennsylvania

- Game time: 1:00 pm EDT
- Game weather: 54 °F (12 °C) (Cloudy)
- Game attendance: 50,744
- Referee: Dick Hantak
- TV announcers: (CBS) Steve Zabriskie (play by play), Hank Stram (color commentator)

Scoring drives:

- Pittsburgh – Mularkey 15 pass from Brister (Anderson kick)
- Minnesota – Wilson 1 run (Garcia kick)
- Pittsburgh – Worley 8 run (Anderson kick)
- Minnesota – Thomas 27 fumble return (Garcia kick)
- Pittsburgh – Hoge 2 run (Anderson kick)
- Pittsburgh – FG Anderson 38
- Pittsburgh – FG Anderson 44

==== Week 4 (Sunday October 1, 1989): at Detroit Lions ====
	1	2	3	4	Total
Steelers	0	10	7	6	23
Lions	3	0	0	0	3

at Pontiac Silverdome, Pontiac, Michigan

- Game time: 1:00 pm EDT
- Game weather: Dome
- Game attendance: 43,804
- Referee: Ben Dreith
- TV announcers: (NBC) Don Criqui (play by play), Ahmad Rashad (color commentator)

Scoring drives:

- Detroit – FG Murray 37
- Pittsburgh – Lipps 48 pass from Brister (Anderson kick)
- Pittsburgh – FG Anderson 20
- Pittsburgh – Carter 1 run (Anderson kick)
- Pittsburgh – Wallace 2 run (pass failed)

==== Week 5 (Sunday October 8, 1989): vs. Cincinnati Bengals ====
	1	2	3	4	Total
Bengals	0	13	0	13	26
Steelers	7	3	3	3	16

at Three Rivers Stadium, Pittsburgh, Pennsylvania

- Game time: 1:00 pm EDT
- Game weather: 43 °F (6 °C) (Cloudy)
- Game attendance: 52,785
- Referee: Howard Roe
- TV announcers: (NBC) Joel Meyers (play by play), Paul Maguire (color commentator)

Scoring drives:

- Pittsburgh – Carter 22 pass from Brister (Anderson kick)
- Cincinnati – FG Breech 24
- Cincinnati – FG Breech 27
- Pittsburgh – FG Anderson 24
- Cincinnati – Martin 7 pass from Esiason (Breech kick)
- Pittsburgh – FG Anderson 40
- Cincinnati – Brooks 13 run (kick failed)
- Pittsburgh – FG Anderson 34
- Cincinnati – Brooks 65 run (Breech kick)

==== Week 6 (Sunday October 15, 1989): at Cleveland Browns ====
	1	2	3	4	Total
Steelers	3	0	7	7	17
Browns	0	0	0	7	7

at Cleveland Municipal Stadium, Cleveland, Ohio

- Game time: 4:00 pm EDT
- Game weather:
- Game attendance: 78,840
- Referee: Gene Barth
- TV announcers: (NBC) Joel Meyers (play by play), Paul Maguire (color commentator)

Scoring drives:

- Pittsburgh – FG Anderson 49
- Pittsburgh – Carter 14 pass from Blackledge (Anderson kick)
- Cleveland – Metcalf 2 run (Bahr kick)
- Pittsburgh – Williams 1 run (Anderson kick)

==== Week 7 (Sunday October 22, 1989): at Houston Oilers ====
	1	2	3	4	Total
Steelers	0	0	0	0	0
Oilers	7	17	3	0	27

at Astrodome, Houston, Texas

- Game time: 1:00 pm EDT
- Game weather: Dome
- Game attendance: 59,091
- Referee: Jerry Markbreit
- TV announcers: (NBC) Tom Hammond (play by play), Joe Namath (color commentator)

Scoring drives:

- Houston – Highsmith 3 pass from Moon (Zendejas kick)
- Houston – FG Zendejas 41
- Houston – Duncan 51 pass from Moon (Zendejas kick)
- Houston – Highsmith 5 pass from Moon (Zendejas kick)
- Houston – FG Zendejas 51

==== Week 8 (Sunday October 29, 1989): vs. Kansas City Chiefs ====
	1	2	3	4	Total
Chiefs	0	3	14	0	17
Steelers	10	6	7	0	23

at Three Rivers Stadium, Pittsburgh, Pennsylvania

- Game time: 1:00 pm EST
- Game weather: 72 °F (22 °C) (Mostly Cloudy)
- Game attendance: 54,194
- Referee: Tom Dooley
- TV announcers: (NBC) Joel Meyers (play by play), Paul Maguire (color commentator)

Scoring drives:

- Pittsburgh – FG Anderson 41
- Pittsburgh – Lipps 16 pass from Brister (Anderson kick)
- Pittsburgh – FG Anderson 47
- Pittsburgh – FG Anderson 29
- Kansas City – FG Lowery 50
- Kansas City – Mandley 8 pass from DeBerg (Lowery kick)
- Kansas City – Maas 4 fumble return (Lowery kick)
- Pittsburgh – Lipps 64 pass from Brister (Anderson kick)

==== Week 9 (Sunday November 5, 1989): at Denver Broncos ====
	1	2	3	4	Total
Steelers	0	7	0	0	7
Broncos	10	3	7	14	34

at Mile High Stadium, Denver, Colorado

- Game time: 4:00 pm EST
- Game weather:
- Game attendance: 74,739
- Referee: Red Cashion
- TV announcers: (NBC) Marv Albert (play by play), Bob Trumpy (color commentator)

Scoring drives:

- Denver – Humphrey 22 run (Treadwell kick)
- Denver – FG Treadwell 26
- Pittsburgh – Carter 15 pass from Brister (Anderson kick)
- Denver – FG Treadwell 26
- Denver – Johnson 44 pass from Elway (Treadwell kick)
- Denver – Elway 2 run (Treadwell kick)
- Denver – Humphrey 12 run (Treadwell kick)

==== Week 10 (Sunday November 12, 1989): vs. Chicago Bears ====
	1	2	3	4	Total
Bears	7	13	0	0	20
Steelers	0	0	0	0	0

at Three Rivers Stadium, Pittsburgh, Pennsylvania

- Game time: 1:00 pm EST
- Game weather: 47 °F (8 °C) (Partly Cloudy)
- Game attendance: 56,505
- Referee: Gordon McCarter
- TV announcers: (CBS) Jim Nantz (play by play), Pat Haden (color commentator)

Scoring drives:

- Chicago – N. Anderson 2 run (Butler kick)
- Chicago – FG Butler 39
- Chicago – Muster 20 pass from Harbaugh (Butler kick)
- Chicago – FG Butler 35

==== Week 11 (Sunday November 19, 1989): vs. San Diego Chargers ====
	1	2	3	4	Total
Chargers	0	7	10	0	17
Steelers	3	3	7	7	20

at Three Rivers Stadium, Pittsburgh, Pennsylvania

- Game time: 1:00 pm EST
- Game weather: 31 °F (−1 °C) (Cloudy)
- Game attendance: 44,203
- Referee: Bob McElwee
- TV announcers: (NBC) Joel Meyers (play by play), Paul Maguire (color commentator)

Scoring drives:

- Pittsburgh – FG Anderson 49
- San Diego – A. Miller 20 pass from McMahon (Bahr kick)
- Pittsburgh – FG Anderson 28
- San Diego – FG Bahr 27
- Pittsburgh – Woodson 84 kickoff return (Anderson kick)
- San Diego – A. Miller 18 pass from McMahon (Bahr kick)
- Pittsburgh – Hoge 1 run (Anderson kick)

==== Week 12 (Sunday November 26, 1989): at Miami Dolphins ====
	1	2	3	4	Total
Steelers	0	17	17	0	34
Dolphins	14	0	0	0	14

at Joe Robbie Stadium, Miami, Florida

- Game time: 1:00 pm EST
- Game weather:
- Game attendance: 59,936
- Referee: Dick Jorgensen
- TV announcers: (NBC) Marv Albert (play by play), Bob Trumpy (color commentator)

Steelers get first ever win against the Dolphins in Miami. This game was played in a driving rain storm.

Scoring drives:

- Miami – Smith 1 run (Stoyanovich kick)
- Miami – Clayton 66 pass from Marino (Stoyanovich kick)
- Pittsburgh – Hoge 1 run (Anderson kick)
- Pittsburgh – Woodruff 21 with lateral after Lake 2 fumble return (Anderson kick)
- Pittsburgh – FG Anderson 27
- Pittsburgh – Hoge 5 run (Anderson kick)
- Pittsburgh – FG Anderson 42
- Pittsburgh – Hoge 1 run (Anderson kick)

==== Week 13 (Sunday December 3, 1989): vs. Houston Oilers ====
	1	2	3	4	Total
Oilers	0	14	2	7	23
Steelers	3	7	3	3	16

at Three Rivers Stadium, Pittsburgh, Pennsylvania

- Game time: 1:00 pm EST
- Game weather: 22 °F (−6 °C) (Light Snow Showers)
- Game attendance: 40,541
- Referee: Ben Dreith
- TV announcers: (NBC) Jim Donovan (play by play), Bob Trumpy (color commentator)

Scoring drives:

- Pittsburgh – FG Anderson 18
- Pittsburgh – Hoge 4 run (Anderson kick)
- Houston – Duncan 18 pass from Moon (Zendejas kick)
- Houston – Hill 27 pass from Moon (Zendejas kick)
- Pittsburgh – FG Anderson 37
- Houston – Safety, McDowell tackled Newsome in end zone
- Pittsburgh – FG Anderson 18
- Houston – White 1 run (Zendejas kick)

==== Week 14 (Sunday December 10, 1989): at New York Jets ====
	1	2	3	4	Total
Steelers	7	0	0	6	13
Jets	0	0	0	0	0

at Giants Stadium, East Rutherford, New Jersey

- Game time: 1:00 pm EST
- Game weather:
- Game attendance: 41,037
- Referee: Johnny Grier
- TV announcers: (NBC) Tom Hammond (play by play), Joe Namath (color commentator)

Scoring drives:

- Pittsburgh – Worley 35 run (Anderson kick)
- Pittsburgh – FG Anderson 42
- Pittsburgh – FG Anderson 45

==== Week 15 (Sunday December 17, 1989): vs. New England Patriots ====
	1	2	3	4	Total
Patriots	3	0	0	7	10
Steelers	7	7	7	7	28

at Three Rivers Stadium, Pittsburgh, Pennsylvania

- Game time: 1:00 pm EST
- Game weather: 5 °F (−15 °C) (Cloudy)
- Game attendance: 26,594
- Referee: Tom Dooley
- TV announcers: (NBC) Jim Donovan (play by play), Jimmy Cefalo (color commentator)

Scoring drives:

- Pittsburgh – Worley 8 run (Anderson kick)
- New England – FG Staurovsky 20
- Pittsburgh – Hoge 1 run (Anderson kick)
- Pittsburgh – Lipps 58 run (Anderson kick)
- Pittsburgh – Hoge 2 run (Anderson kick)
- New England – C. Jones 12 pass from Wilson (Staurovsky kick)

==== Week 16 (Sunday December 24, 1989): at Tampa Bay Buccaneers ====
	1	2	3	4	Total
Steelers	7	17	7	0	31
Buccaneers	7	3	3	9	22

- Game time: 1:00 pm EST
- Game weather:
- Game attendance: 29,690
- Referee: Jerry Seeman
- TV announcers: (NBC) Joel Meyers (play by play), Paul Maguire (color commentator)

Scoring drives:

- Pittsburgh – Worley 1 run (Anderson kick)
- Tampa Bay – Carrier 7 pass from Ferguson (Igwebuike kick)
- Pittsburgh – Lipps 79 pass from Brister (Anderson kick)
- Tampa Bay – FG Igwebuike 45
- Pittsburgh – Lipps 12 pass from Brister (Anderson kick)
- Pittsburgh – FG Anderson 32
- Tampa Bay – FG Igwebuike 24
- Pittsburgh – Worley 1 run (Anderson kick)
- Tampa Bay – Safety Cocroft blocked punt out of end zone
- Tampa Bay – Carrier 39 pass from Ferguson (Igwebuike kick)

=== Standings ===
AFC Central
	W	L	T	PCT	DIV	CONF	PF	PA	STK
^{(2)} Cleveland Browns	9	6	1	.594	3–3	6–5–1	334	254	W2
^{(4)} Houston Oilers	9	7	0	.563	3–3	6–6	365	412	L2
^{(5)} Pittsburgh Steelers	9	7	0	.563	1–5	6–6	265	326	W3
Cincinnati Bengals	8	8	0	.500	5–1	6–6	404	285	L1

== Playoffs ==
=== Game summaries ===
==== AFC Wild Card Playoff (Sunday December 31, 1989): at Houston Oilers ====
	1	2	3	4	OT	Total
Steelers	7	3	3	10	3	26
Oilers	0	6	3	14	0	23

at Astrodome, Houston, Texas

- Game time: 4:00 pm EST
- Game weather: Dome
- Game attendance: 58,306
- Referee: Pat Haggerty
- TV announcers: (NBC) Marv Albert (play by play), Bob Trumpy (color commentator)

Scoring drives:

- Pittsburgh – Worley 9 run (Anderson kick)
- Houston – FG Zendejas 26
- Houston – FG Zendejas 35
- Pittsburgh – FG Anderson 25
- Houston – FG Zendejas 26
- Pittsburgh – FG Anderson 30
- Pittsburgh – FG Anderson 48
- Houston – Givins 18 pass from Moon (Zendejas kick)
- Houston – Givins 9 pass from Moon (Zendejas kick)
- Pittsburgh – Hoge 2 run (Anderson kick)
- Pittsburgh – FG Anderson 50

==== AFC Divisional Playoff (Sunday January 7, 1990): at Denver Broncos ====
	1	2	3	4	Total
Steelers	3	14	3	3	23
Broncos	0	10	7	7	24

at Mile High Stadium, Denver, Colorado

- Game time: 4:00 pm EST
- Game weather:
- Game attendance: 75,868
- Referee: Gene Barth
- TV announcers: (NBC) Dick Enberg (play by play), Bill Walsh (color commentator)

Scoring drives:

- Pittsburgh – FG Anderson 32
- Pittsburgh – Hoge 7 run (Anderson kick)
- Denver – Bratton 1 run (Treadwell kick)
- Pittsburgh – Lipps 9 pass from Brister (Anderson kick)
- Denver – FG Treadwell 43
- Denver – Johnson 37 pass from Elway (Treadwell kick)
- Pittsburgh – FG Anderson 35
- Pittsburgh – FG Anderson 32
- Denver – Bratton 1 run (Treadwell kick)

== Awards and honors ==
- Tunch Ilkin, AFC Pro Bowl
- Carnell Lake, Steelers Rookie of the Year
- Rod Woodson, AFC Pro Bowl
