= Kyle Kramer =

American football player (born 1967)

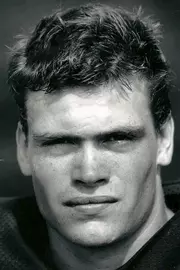

No. 40
- Position: Defensive back

Personal information
- Born: January 12, 1967 (age 59); Kansas City, Missouri, U.S.
- Listed height: 6 ft 3 in (1.91 m)
- Listed weight: 190 lb (86 kg)

Career information
- High school: Kettering (OH) Fairmont
- College: Bowling Green
- NFL draft: 1989: 5th round, 114th overall pick

Career history
- Cleveland Browns (1989–1990)

Career NFL statistics
- Interceptions: 1
- Stats at Pro Football Reference

Kyle Kramer (born January 12, 1967) is an American former professional football player who was a defensive back in the National Football League (NFL). He played for the Cleveland Browns in 1989. He played college football for the Bowling Green Falcons and was selected by the Browns in the fifth round of the 1989 NFL draft.

Kramer was inducted into the 2020 Kettering Fairmont High School Hall of Fame. Earning 6 varsity letter in Football and Track. He was named most Valuable Defensive Back in 1984 and most Valuable in Track in 1984 and 1985. Kramer was the first KFHS graduate to play in the NFL.

Kramer was inducted to the Bowling Green Hall of Fame in 2011. He was a four-year letter winner and a three-year starter at safety for the football Falcons. A two-time All-Mid-American Conference First-Team selection and earned All-American honorable his last two seasons. As a senior, Kramer was a team co-captain, and was named the Falcons’ Most Valuable Player. He led the team with a total of 143 tackles, ranking fifth in the MAC. Kramer’s career total of 399 tackles during his college career was the third highest in BGSU history at the time of his graduation, and still ranks today. He was named to the Academic All-MAC Team on two occasions. He Studied Bio Pre-Med.

He was selected by the Cleveland Browns in the fifth round of the 1989 NFL draft with the 114th overall pick. During his career, he had 17 special teams stops during the regular season as a rookie in ‘89, and recorded his first NFL interception in the Dec. 17 game vs. Minnesota. He missed several games due to a thigh injury that year. He suffered a career ending injury during the Hall of Fame Game in 1990. Kramer was with the Browns until 1991.
