= Vernon Joines =

American football player (born 1965)

No. 80, 11
- Position: Wide receiver

Personal information
- Born: June 20, 1965 (age 61); Charlotte, North Carolina, U.S.
- Listed height: 6 ft 2 in (1.88 m)
- Listed weight: 200 lb (91 kg)

Career information
- High school: Baltimore (MD) Southwestern
- College: Maryland
- NFL draft: 1989: 5th round, 116th overall pick

Career history
- Cleveland Browns (1989–1990); Denver Broncos (1992)*
- * Offseason or practice squad member only
- Stats at Pro Football Reference

Vernon Joines (born June 20, 1965) is an American former professional football player who was a wide receiver for the Cleveland Browns of the National Football League (NFL) from 1989 to 1990. He played college football for the Maryland Terrapins.

Pre-draft measurables
Height	Weight	40-yard dash	10-yard split	20-yard split	20-yard shuttle	Vertical jump
6 ft 1 1/8 in (1.86 m)	190 lb (86 kg)	4.51 s	1.58 s	2.64 s	4.07 s	38.5 in (0.98 m)
All values from NFL Combine
