= Kevin Robbins =

American football player (born 1966)

No. 72
- Positions: Tackle, guard

Personal information
- Born: December 12, 1966 (age 59); Washington, D.C., U.S.
- Listed height: 6 ft 5 in (1.96 m)
- Listed weight: 286 lb (130 kg)

Career information
- High school: H. D. Woodson (Washington, D.C.)
- College: Wichita State; Michigan State
- NFL draft: 1989: 3rd round, 75th overall pick

Career history
- Los Angeles Rams (1989)*; Dallas Cowboys (1989); Cleveland Browns (1989–1990); Atlanta Falcons (1991); Miami Dolphins (1992); Los Angeles Rams (1993)
- * Offseason or practice squad member only

Career NFL statistics
- Games played: 8
- Games started: 4
- Stats at Pro Football Reference

Kevin Robbins (born December 12, 1966) is an American former professional football player who was a tackle and guard in the National Football League (NFL) for the Cleveland Browns from 1989 to 1990 and for the Los Angeles Rams in 1993. After playing college football for the Wichita State Shockers and Michigan State Spartans, he was selected by the Rams in the third round of the 1989 NFL draft with the 75th overall pick.
