= Terry O'Shea =

American football player

No. 85, 81
- Position: Tight end

Personal information
- Born: December 3, 1966 (age 59); Pittsburgh, Pennsylvania, U.S.
- Listed height: 6 ft 4 in (1.93 m)
- Listed weight: 236 lb (107 kg)

Career information
- High school: Seton-La Salle (Mt. Lebanon, Pennsylvania)
- College: California (PA)
- NFL draft: 1989: undrafted

Career history
- Pittsburgh Steelers (1989–1990); Barcelona Dragons (1992)

Career NFL statistics
- Receptions: 2
- Receiving yards: 21
- Stats at Pro Football Reference

Terence William O'Shea (born December 3, 1966) is an American former professional football player who was a tight end in the National Football League (NFL) and the World League of American Football (WLAF). He played for the Pittsburgh Steelers of the NFL, and the Barcelona Dragons of the WLAF. O'Shea played college football for the California Vulcans.
