= Mike Oliphant =

American football player (born 1963)

No. 25, 33, 89, 3, 19
- Position: Running back

Personal information
- Born: May 19, 1963 (age 63); Jacksonville, Florida, U.S.
- Listed height: 5 ft 10 in (1.78 m)
- Listed weight: 183 lb (83 kg)

Career information
- High school: Federal Way (WA)
- College: Puget Sound
- NFL draft: 1988: 3rd round, 66th overall pick

Career history
- Washington Redskins (1988); Cleveland Browns (1989–1991); Seattle Seahawks (1992)*; Sacramento Gold Miners (1993–1994); Winnipeg Blue Bombers (1995)
- * Offseason or practice squad member only

Career NFL statistics
- Rushing yards: 127
- Rushing average: 5.5
- Rushing touchdowns: 1
- Stats at Pro Football Reference

Michael Nathaniel Oliphant (born May 19, 1963) is an American former professional football player who was a running back in the National Football League (NFL) for the Washington Redskins and Cleveland Browns. He also played in the Canadian Football League (CFL) for the Sacramento Gold Miners and Winnipeg Blue Bombers.

== Early life ==
Oliphant was born in Jacksonville, Florida. He attended Auburn Senior High School in Auburn, Washington, then transferred to Federal Way High School in Federal Way, Washington midway through his junior year. He did not play varsity high school football.

== College career ==
Oliphant played college football at the NAIA Division I University of Puget Sound, where he was a NAIA All-American in 1986. That year, he also set school records for most points scored in one game and most points scored in a season. Oliphant graduated in 1988.

== Professional career ==
Oliphant was selected in the third round of the 1988 NFL draft by the Washington Redskins. He was traded to the Cleveland Browns in 1989 for Earnest Byner. He was in Cleveland for three seasons, spending all of 1990 and 12 games of 1991 on injured-reserve status with hamstring injuries. He was signed by the Seattle Seahawks in 1992, but was released before the start of the season. He finished his career in the CFL with the Sacramento Gold Miners and the Winnipeg Blue Bombers.
