= Bubby Brister =

American football player (born 1962)

No. 6
- Position: Quarterback

Personal information
- Born: August 15, 1962 (age 64); Alexandria, Louisiana, U.S.
- Listed height: 6 ft 3 in (1.91 m)
- Listed weight: 212 lb (96 kg)

Career information
- High school: Neville (Monroe, Louisiana)
- College: Tulane (1982–1983); Northeast Louisiana (1984–1985)
- NFL draft: 1986: 3rd round, 67th overall pick

Career history
- Pittsburgh Steelers (1986–1992); Philadelphia Eagles (1993–1994); New York Jets (1995); Denver Broncos (1997–1999); Minnesota Vikings (2000); Kansas City Chiefs (2001)*; Tampa Bay Buccaneers (2001)*
- * Offseason or practice squad member only

Awards and highlights
- 2× Super Bowl champion (XXXII, XXXIII)

Career NFL statistics
- Passing attempts: 2,212
- Passing completions: 1,207
- Completion percentage: 54.6%
- TD–INT: 81–78
- Passing yards: 14,445
- Passer rating: 72.3
- Rushing yards: 546
- Rushing touchdowns: 8
- Stats at Pro Football Reference

Walter Andrew "Bubby" Brister III (born August 15, 1962) is an American former professional football player who was a quarterback in the National Football League (NFL) for the Pittsburgh Steelers, Philadelphia Eagles, New York Jets, Denver Broncos, and Minnesota Vikings. He played college football for the Tulane Green Wave and Northeast Louisiana Indians before being selected in the third round of the 1986 NFL draft by the Steelers.

== Highschool and college career ==
Brister played high school football in Monroe, Louisiana. He was a two-sport athlete and was selected out of high school in the 1981 Major League Baseball draft by the Detroit Tigers. He played a season of minor league baseball with the Bristol Tigers in Bristol, Virginia. Brister enrolled at Tulane University in New Orleans to play college football. He transferred to Northeast Louisiana University (now known as the University of Louisiana at Monroe) in Monroe in 1984 after being replaced by John English as Tulane's starting quarterback.

== Professional career ==
=== Pittsburgh Steelers ===
After Brister was selected, almost immediately comparisons were made between him and Steelers great Terry Bradshaw, who is also from Louisiana. Over the years Pittsburgh sports writers and Steelers fans frequently made jokes about Brister's thick Southern accent and perceived lack of sophistication, traits of Bradshaw's which were similarly mocked. Brister's name supposedly is a mispronunciation of "brother" and one of his sisters called him it first. In a similar vein to Bradshaw, Brister's name was often misspoken. In a 1999 Sports Illustrated interview, Brister said "Bubba Brewster" and "Bobby Blister" were common manglings of his name.

Brister was a backup to Mark Malone for two seasons, starting two games as a rookie in 1986 and appearing briefly in relief in two games in 1987. In his NFL debut in October 1986, Pittsburgh faced the Cincinnati Bengals, their rivals, on Monday Night Football. Although the Steelers lost 24–22, Brister passed for 191 yards and scored a rushing touchdown. In 1988, he won a three-way competition for the Steelers' starting quarterback job with Todd Blackledge and Steve Bono.

Career highlights during his 1988–1991 run as Pittsburgh's starting quarterback included ranking fourth in the NFL in average yards per pass completion in 1988 and 10th in the league in passer rating in 1990. He had five scoring passes that were 65 yards or longer in 1988, including an 89-yard touchdown to Louis Lipps vs the Philadelphia Eagles on November 13 that was the longest pass completion by a Steeler in Three Rivers Stadium history. In 1989, he set a team record with 15 consecutive pass completions in a road win over Detroit, including a 48 yarder to Lipps. Brister also set a team record in 1989 throwing 178 consecutive passes without an interception. In 1990 Brister established career highs for starts (16), yards passing (2,725) and touchdown passes (20). He missed eight games with injuries in 1991, setting up a competition with back up Neil O'Donnell for the starting job. Pittsburgh went 5–3 when Brister played, only 2–6 with O'Donnell as a starter. Brister was the starting quarterback during Hall Of Fame Coach Chuck Noll's final post season run with the Steelers, winning the 1989 AFC Wild Card in overtime on the road against the Houston Oilers, then losing a close game to eventual AFC champion Denver Broncos. He led an 82-yard drive at the end of the fourth quarter to tie the Houston game and force overtime. Against Denver, he passed for 229 yards and one touchdown, with no turnovers.

One of Brister's famous quotes came after a 1991 game between the Houston Oilers and Pittsburgh Steelers. Pittsburgh was getting blown out in the game and coach Chuck Noll wanted to pull starter Neil O'Donnell and replace him with Brister to finish the hopeless game. Brister replied "I don't mop up for anybody." O'Donnell was starting in place of an injured Brister. Even though Brister was not forced to enter that late-season loss against Houston, he did supplant the struggling O'Donnell the next week, starting the team's final two games and winning against Cincinnati and the Cleveland Browns.

Brister played for the Steelers for seven years, several of them as the regular starter at quarterback. In 1992, new Steelers head coach Bill Cowher chose backup quarterback O'Donnell over Brister, effectively ending his career as a starting player for the Steelers. Still Brister played a significant role in the team's 1992 success. Brister won two games as a starter for an injured O'Donnell against the Indianapolis Colts and Cleveland Browns. In the Cleveland game, the Steelers needed to win to clinch home field advantage throughout the AFC Playoffs and Brister passed for 223 yards, 1 touchdown, and no interceptions, and had a string of 11 consecutive pass completions in one stretch. In two other games Brister came off the bench, relieving a struggling O'Donnell after he was hurt and leading fourth-quarter comebacks over the Seattle Seahawks and Detroit Lions.

=== Later career ===
After brief stops as a backup quarterback for Philadelphia and the New York Jets, Brister sat out the 1996 season. In his first season in Philadelphia in 1993, Brister ranked seventh in the league in passer rating and fourth in lowest interception percentage, starting 8 games with two relief appearances subbing for an injured Randall Cunningham. Highlights of the season included his 27 completions, 245 yards, two touchdowns game vs. the Super Bowl champion Dallas Cowboys on Monday Night Football, and a 353 yards, three touchdowns performance in the final game of the regular season, again on Monday Night Football, leading the Eagles to a win over the NFC West champion San Francisco 49ers. Brister's interception percentage that year was the lowest in Eagles team history for more than a decade until eclipsed by Donovan McNabb. His former teammate in Philadelphia, linebacker Bill Romanowski, had signed with Denver and in 1997 suggested to Broncos head coach Mike Shanahan that he take a look at Brister.

Brister signed with Denver and became the third-string quarterback for the 1997 season, backing up Hall of Fame quarterback John Elway and Jeff Lewis. Brister's only significant playing time in the 1997 season came in a week 17 game against the San Diego Chargers. Before the 1998 season Lewis had fallen out of favor with the Broncos, thus Brister became the primary backup quarterback. During the 1998 season, Elway was forced to sit out a number of games due to injury and Brister started those games in his place. Brister played well and the Broncos went undefeated in his starts (4–0); He also broke the team's (then) record for longest rushing touchdown by a quarterback and recorded a higher passer rating than Elway. However, when Elway retired in 1999, Brister was passed over for the starting spot in favor of Brian Griese, and the Broncos released him after that season. During his three seasons with the Broncos, Brister won two Super Bowl rings.

Brister spent 2000 with the Vikings. He signed with the Kansas City Chiefs in 2001 but was cut before the season began. He retired from football. He finished his career with a passing record of 1,207 completions in 2,212 attempts for 14,445 passing yards and 81 touchdowns. Brister played in three conference championship games and two Super Bowls.

== NFL career statistics ==
Legend
| | Won the Super Bowl |
| | Led the league |
| **Bold** | Career high |

=== Regular season ===
| Year | Team | Games | | | Passing | | | | | | | | | Rushing | | | | | Sacks | |
| Year | Team | GP | GS | Record | Cmp | Att | Pct | Yds | Y/A | Lng | TD | Int | Rtg | Att | Yds | Avg | Lng | TD | Sck | Yds |
|---|---|---|---|---|---|---|---|---|---|---|---|---|---|---|---|---|---|---|---|---|
| 1986 | PIT | 2 | 2 | 0–2 | 21 | 60 | 35.0 | 291 | 4.9 | 58 | 0 | 2 | 37.6 | 6 | 10 | 1.7 | 9 | 1 | 6 | 57 |
| 1987 | PIT | 2 | 0 | 0–0 | 4 | 12 | 33.3 | 20 | 1.7 | 10 | 0 | 3 | 2.8 | 0 | 0 | 0.0 | 0 | 0 | 2 | 14 |
| 1988 | PIT | 13 | 13 | 4–9 | 175 | 370 | 47.3 | 2,634 | 7.1 | 89 | 11 | **14** | 65.3 | **45** | **209** | 4.6 | 20 | **6** | 36 | 292 |
| 1989 | PIT | 14 | 14 | 8–6 | 187 | 342 | 54.7 | 2,365 | 6.9 | 79 | 9 | 10 | 73.1 | 27 | 25 | 0.9 | 15 | 0 | **45** | **452** |
| 1990 | PIT | **16** | **16** | **9–7** | **223** | **387** | 57.6 | **2,725** | 7.0 | **90** | **20** | **14** | 81.6 | 25 | 64 | 2.6 | 11 | 0 | 28 | 213 |
| 1991 | PIT | 8 | 8 | 5–3 | 103 | 190 | 54.2 | 1,350 | 7.1 | 65 | 9 | 9 | 72.9 | 11 | 17 | 1.5 | 8 | 0 | 15 | 145 |
| 1992 | PIT | 6 | 4 | 2–2 | 63 | 116 | 54.3 | 719 | 6.2 | 42 | 2 | 5 | 61.0 | 10 | 16 | 1.6 | 8 | 0 | 13 | 88 |
| 1993 | PHI | 10 | 8 | 4–4 | 181 | 309 | 58.6 | 1,905 | 6.2 | 58 | 14 | 5 | 84.9 | 20 | 39 | 2.0 | 13 | 0 | 19 | 148 |
| 1994 | PHI | 7 | 2 | 0–2 | 51 | 76 | **67.1** | 507 | 6.7 | 53 | 2 | 1 | 89.1 | 1 | 7 | 7.0 | 7 | 0 | 5 | 39 |
| 1995 | NYJ | 9 | 4 | 1–3 | 93 | 170 | 54.7 | 726 | 4.3 | 32 | 4 | 8 | 53.7 | 16 | 18 | 1.1 | 7 | 0 | 16 | 122 |
| 1997 | DEN | 1 | 0 | 0–0 | 6 | 9 | 66.7 | 48 | 5.3 | 15 | 0 | 0 | 79.9 | 4 | 2 | 0.5 | 2 | 0 | 0 | 0 |
| 1998 | DEN | 7 | 4 | 4–0 | 78 | 131 | 59.5 | 986 | **7.5** | 48 | 10 | 3 | **99.0** | 19 | 102 | 5.4 | **38** | 1 | 7 | 49 |
| 1999 | DEN | 2 | 0 | 0–0 | 12 | 20 | 60.0 | 87 | 4.4 | 11 | 0 | 3 | 30.6 | 2 | 17 | **8.5** | 17 | 0 | 0 | 0 |
| 2000 | MIN | 2 | 0 | 0–0 | 10 | 20 | 50.0 | 82 | 4.1 | 20 | 0 | 1 | 40.0 | 5 | 20 | 4.0 | 12 | 0 | 1 | 6 |
| Career | | 99 | 75 | 37–38 | 1,207 | 2,212 | 54.6 | 14,445 | 6.5 | 90 | 81 | 78 | 72.3 | 191 | 546 | 2.9 | 38 | 8 | 193 | 1,625 |

=== Playoffs ===
| Year | Team | Games | | | Passing | | | | | | | | | Rushing | | | | | Sacks | |
| Year | Team | GP | GS | Record | Cmp | Att | Pct | Yds | Y/A | Lng | TD | Int | Rtg | Att | Yds | Avg | Lng | TD | Sck | Yds |
|---|---|---|---|---|---|---|---|---|---|---|---|---|---|---|---|---|---|---|---|---|
| 1989 | PIT | **2** | **2** | **1–1** | **34** | **62** | **54.8** | **356** | **5.7** | **33** | **1** | 0 | **77.1** | 3 | **5** | **1.7** | **4** | 0 | **1** | **15** |
| 1997 | DEN | 1 | 0 | – | 0 | 0 | 0.0 | 0 | 0.0 | 0 | 0 | 0 | 0.0 | 0 | 0 | 0.0 | 0 | 0 | 0 | 0 |
| 1998 | DEN | **2** | 0 | – | 0 | 0 | 0.0 | 0 | 0.0 | 0 | 0 | 0 | 0.0 | **7** | -3 | -0.4 | 2 | 0 | 0 | 0 |
| 2000 | MIN | 1 | 0 | – | 0 | 0 | 0.0 | 0 | 0.0 | 0 | 0 | 0 | 0.0 | 0 | 0 | 0.0 | 0 | 0 | 0 | 0 |
| Career | | 6 | 2 | 1–1 | 34 | 62 | 54.8 | 356 | 5.7 | 33 | 1 | 0 | 77.1 | 10 | 2 | 0.2 | 4 | 0 | 1 | 15 |

== After football ==
After retiring from football, Brister was a television sports analyst for Fox Sports Rocky Mountain for a short time in Denver. In 2003, he became the co-host of a hunting and fishing oriented show called Louisiana Outdoor Adventures on the Outdoor Channel. In 2005, he joined the staff of Hunter's Specialties, a producer of hunting and fishing adventure videos.

Brister lives in Mandeville, Louisiana with his wife and two children.
