= Webster Slaughter =

American football player (born 1964)

No. 84, 89, 85, 87
- Position: Wide receiver

Personal information
- Born: October 19, 1964 (age 62); Stockton, California, U.S.
- Listed height: 6 ft 1 in (1.85 m)
- Listed weight: 175 lb (79 kg)

Career information
- High school: Franklin (Stockton)
- College: San Diego State
- NFL draft: 1986: 2nd round, 43rd overall pick

Career history
- Cleveland Browns (1986–1991); Houston Oilers (1992–1994); Kansas City Chiefs (1995); New York Jets (1996); San Diego Chargers (1998); Baltimore Ravens (1999)*
- * Offseason or practice squad member only

Awards and highlights
- First-team All-Pro (1989); 2× Pro Bowl (1989, 1993); Cleveland Browns Legends; Second-Team All-American (1985)

Career NFL statistics
- Receptions: 563
- Receiving yards: 8,111
- Receiving touchdowns: 44
- Stats at Pro Football Reference

Webster Melvin Slaughter (born October 19, 1964) is an American former professional football player who was a wide receiver in the National Football League (NFL) from 1986 to 1998. He played college football for the San Diego State Aztecs.

== Early life ==
Slaughter was born in Stockton, California, where he attended Franklin High School. Slaughter was raised alongside five siblings by his mother, a nurse, after his father died when Webster was 13.

Slaughter excelled in the sports of basketball, baseball, and track alongside the band and speech teams at high school. However, at the request of football coach Duke Pasquini, he played on the football team for his senior year despite his doubts due to his small size of 140 pounds (64 kg). It resulted in an All-Conference selection.

Upon graduating in 1982, Slaughter attended San Joaquin Delta College (after considering Cal State Stanislaus) for football and part-time baseball for two years before transferring to San Diego State University with a scholarship, where he played for two years. In two seasons, Slaughter caught 122 passes for 1,647 yards and 14 touchdowns. He was a second-team All-America selection as a senior.

== Professional career ==
=== Cleveland Browns ===
Cleveland Browns general manager Ernie Accorsi drafted Slaughter in the second round (43rd overall) of the 1986 NFL draft, based on the strong recommendation of the Browns' Hall of Fame receiver Paul Warfield, who was an unofficial scout for the team in 1986. During his rookie season, Slaughter was listed at 6 feet 0 inches (1.83 m) and 175 pounds (79 kg), and had 40 receptions for 577 yards and four touchdowns in 16 games. He played in both games of the postseason for the Browns and caught six passes for 86 yards in the 23–20 victory over the New York Jets in the Divisional Round. Slaughter's 37-yard catch near the sideline late in the fourth quarter proved crucial when Mark Moseley's field goal was successful to force overtime in the eventual victory. In the AFC Championship Game against the Denver Broncos, Slaughter caught just one pass for 20 yards after suffering a dislocated shoulder in the first quarter as the Browns lost 23–20.

In 1987, Slaughter played in 12 games and caught 47 passes for 806 yards and seven touchdowns. The Browns met the Broncos again the AFC Championship Game. Slaughter caught just four passes for 53 yards, but one of them was a four-yard catch for a touchdown that made the game tied at 31 in the fourth quarter. However, his unwillingness to make a critical block on Jeremiah Castille late in the game was faulted by coach Marty Schottenheimer as to blame for The Fumble. The Browns went on to lose the game 38–33.

Slaughter played in just eight games in 1988, catching 30 passes for 462 yards and three touchdowns while dealing with a broken arm. However, he was ready for another postseason run. Facing the Houston Oilers in the Wild Card Round, Slaughter caught two touchdown passes to keep Cleveland in the game, narrowing deficits in the third quarter and fourth quarter despite catching a total of five passes for 58 yards. However, the Browns never recovered from losing the lead in the first quarter and lost 24–23.

Slaughter had a breakout year in 1989, recording 65 receptions for 1,236 yards and six touchdowns in 16 games. He caught a pass from the 43 against the Chicago Bears when the Browns were at the three-yard line in a game and ran all the way to the end zone to set a new record for longest Browns passing touchdown in team history that stood for a number of years. Slaughter's receiving yards in a season was a Cleveland record until Braylon Edwards passed him in 2007. In the Divisional Round of the playoffs, Slaughter and the Browns faced the Buffalo Bills. He caught a touchdown pass from 52 yards to give Cleveland a lead in the second quarter before catching another pass in the third for 44 yards and a ten-point lead. He caught three passes for 114 yards and two touchdowns as Cleveland held on to win 34–30. During the AFC Championship Game against Denver, he caught just three passes for 36 yards in the 37–21 loss.

In 1990, Slaughter caught 59 passes for 847 yards and four touchdowns and played much of the same in his final year with Cleveland in 1991, recording 64 receptions for 906 yards and three touchdowns. Slaughter's highlight game in catches was in the December 22 game, when he had 11 receptions for 138 yards in a 17–10 loss to the Pittsburgh Steelers. It was the only time in Slaughter's career where he caught more than nine passes in a game. As a member of the Browns, Slaughter had 305 receptions for 4,834 yards and 27 touchdowns in six seasons, earning the praise of Accorsi who stated, "(He was) one of the best receivers the Browns ever had."

=== Houston Oilers ===
Slaughter left for the Houston Oilers (known for their Run and shoot offense) after the 1991 season ended due to a contract dispute that led to a lawsuit that went in favor of Slaughter and made him a free agent. In 1992, Slaughter caught 39 passes for 486 yards for four touchdowns in 12 games and nine starts. The Oilers made the postseason and played the Buffalo Bills. He caught eight passes for 73 yards while scoring a touchdown that was the first of three touchdowns in the second quarter for Houston. The Oilers had a 28–3 lead at halftime and were up by 32 in the third quarter, but Buffalo scored five straight touchdown passes from that point. When the score was 35–24, Slaughter tipped a ball off his hands that resulted in an interception by Henry Jones at the 23-yard line that saw them eventually score and narrow the game even further. The Bills took the lead by three with 3:08 to go, but Slaughter caught an 18-yard pass on fourth down at the 34 to help set up a tying field goal. However, an interception in overtime set up Buffalo for the winning field goal that made the final score 41–38 in the largest comeback in NFL history at the time.

In 1993, Slaughter was targeted more and reaped the rewards, catching a career-high 77 passes for 904 yards and five touchdowns in 14 games. He received his second and final Pro Bowl selection. Slaughter suffered a knee injury late in the season, which resulted in him being placed on injured reserve by the final game of the year that cost him a chance to play in the playoffs.

In 1994, Slaughter played in 16 games with 12 starts, catching 68 passes for 846 yards and two touchdowns.

=== Kansas City Chiefs ===
Slaughter moved over to the Kansas City Chiefs and started seven games in 1995, catching 34 passes for 514 yards and four touchdowns. He made his final postseason appearance in the 1996 playoffs for Kansas City. In a 10–7 loss, Slaughter caught two passes for 10 yards.

=== New York Jets ===
Slaughter moved to the New York Jets for 1996, where he played sparingly after being inactive for six weeks in the middle of the year, which resulted in 32 catches for 434 yards and two touchdowns. Slaughter retired after the 1996 season.

=== San Diego Chargers ===
Slaughter signed with the San Diego Chargers in 1998. He played in 10 games before getting hurt and placed on injured reserve after catching just one pass in his final game on November 15 against Baltimore.

=== Baltimore Ravens ===
Slaughter participated in the 1999 training camp of the Baltimore Ravens, but he did not make the 53-man roster and retired afterwards. Slaughter finished his career with 563 receptions for 8,111 yards and 44 touchdowns to go along with nine carries for 50 yards.

== Personal life ==
Slaughter currently serves as an ordained minister, where he goes to senior living facilities and reads the Bible to residents. Slaughter has four children.

In 2020, Slaughter was selected as a new member of the Cleveland Browns Legends program; the ceremony took place during the 2021 season.

== NFL career statistics ==
Legend
	Led the league
**Bold**	Career high

=== Regular season ===
Year	Team	Games		Receiving				
Year	Team	GP	GS	Rec	Yds	Avg	Lng	TD
1986	CLE	16	16	40	577	14.4	47	4
1987	CLE	12	12	47	806	17.1	54	**7**
1988	CLE	8	8	30	462	15.4	41	3
1989	CLE	16	16	65	**1,236**	**19.0**	**97**	6
1990	CLE	16	16	59	847	14.4	50	4
1991	CLE	16	16	64	906	14.2	62	3
1992	HOU	12	9	39	486	12.5	36	4
1993	HOU	14	14	**77**	904	11.7	41	5
1994	HOU	16	12	68	846	12.4	57	2
1995	KC	16	7	34	514	15.1	38	4
1996	NYJ	10	1	32	434	13.6	53	2
1998	SD	10	0	8	93	11.6	31	0
Career		162	127	563	8,111	14.4	97	44

=== Postseason ===
Year	Team	Games		Receiving				
Year	Team	GP	GS	Rec	Yds	Avg	Lng	TD
1986	CLE	2	2	7	106	15.1	37	0
1987	CLE	2	2	5	67	13.4	24	1
1988	CLE	1	1	5	58	11.6	18	**2**
1989	CLE	2	2	6	**150**	**25.0**	**52**	**2**
1992	HOU	1	1	**8**	73	9.1	18	1
1995	KC	1	1	2	10	5.0	13	0
Career		9	9	33	464	14.1	52	6
