= Tim Manoa =

American football player (born 1964)

No. 42, 44
- Position: Fullback

Personal information
- Born: September 9, 1964 (age 62); Tonga
- Listed height: 6 ft 1 in (1.85 m)
- Listed weight: 227 lb (103 kg)

Career information
- High school: North Allegheny Senior (Wexford, Pennsylvania, U.S.)
- College: Penn State
- NFL draft: 1987: 3rd round, 80th overall pick

Career history
- Cleveland Browns (1987–1989); New Orleans Saints (1991)*; Indianapolis Colts (1991)
- * Offseason or practice squad member only

Awards and highlights
- National champion (1986)

Career NFL statistics
- Rushing yards: 938
- Rushing average: 4
- Rushing touchdowns: 6
- Stats at Pro Football Reference

Timote Taliai Manoa (born September 9, 1964) is a Tongan-born former professional football player. He played fullback for four seasons in the National Football League (NFL) for the Cleveland Browns and Indianapolis Colts. He played collegiately at Penn State and was a member of both the 1986 national championship team. Manoa was born in Tonga, but at age 10 moved to Hawaii where he discovered American football. He attended Kahuku High School from grades 7 to 9 before moving to Wexford, Pennsylvania. There he attended North Allegheny High . Manoa was named a Parade All-American and was heavily recruited by several top college football programs, including West Virginia, Pitt, Hawaii, and Ohio State, before selecting Penn State.

After outstanding junior and senior seasons as part of Penn State's "Baby Bull Backfield" fullback tandem (with Steve Smith), Manoa was invited to the Hula Bowl, Senior Bowl, and the NFL Combine where his NFL draft stock rose steadily.

Pre-draft measurables
Height	Weight	Arm length	Hand span	40-yard dash	10-yard split	20-yard split	20-yard shuttle	Vertical jump	Broad jump	Bench press
6 ft 0 in (1.83 m)	232 lb (105 kg)	31 1/2 in (0.80 m)	9 1/4 in (0.23 m)	4.71 s	1.65 s	2.77 s	4.35 s	24.5 in (0.62 m)	8 ft 10 in (2.69 m)	22 reps
All values from NFL Combine

He was selected in the 3rd round (#80) of the 1987 NFL draft by the Browns. He would play 3 seasons in Cleveland under Marty Schottenheimer and Bud Carson before moving on for a final season with Indianapolis.

Manoa now teaches speed training at Rocky's Personalized Training in Boardman, Ohio.

== NFL career statistics ==
Legend
**Bold**	Career high

=== Regular season ===
Year	Team	Games		Rushing					Receiving				
Year	Team	GP	GS	Att	Yds	Avg	Lng	TD	Rec	Yds	Avg	Lng	TD
1987	CLE	12	0	23	116	5.0	35	0	1	8	8.0	8	0
1988	CLE	**16**	4	**99**	**389**	3.9	34	2	10	54	5.4	9	0
1989	CLE	**16**	**15**	87	289	3.3	22	**3**	**27**	**241**	**8.9**	**32**	**2**
1991	IND	9	5	27	144	**5.3**	**44**	1	2	5	2.5	5	0
		53	24	236	938	4.0	44	6	40	308	7.7	32	2

=== Playoffs ===
Year	Team	Games		Rushing					Receiving				
Year	Team	GP	GS	Att	Yds	Avg	Lng	TD	Rec	Yds	Avg	Lng	TD
1987	CLE	**2**	0	4	10	**2.5**	**6**	0	0	0	0.0	0	0
1988	CLE	1	0	0	0	0.0	0	0	0	0	0.0	0	0
1989	CLE	**2**	0	**5**	**11**	2.2	3	**1**	**1**	**8**	**8.0**	**8**	0
		5	0	9	21	2.3	6	1	1	8	8.0	8	0
