= Tim Worley =

American football player (born 1966)

No. 38
- Position: Running back

Personal information
- Born: September 24, 1966 (age 60); Lumberton, North Carolina, U.S.
- Listed height: 6 ft 2 in (1.88 m)
- Listed weight: 230 lb (104 kg)

Career information
- High school: Lumberton
- College: Georgia (1985–1988)
- NFL draft: 1989: 1st round, 7th overall pick

Career history
- Pittsburgh Steelers (1989–1993); Chicago Bears (1993–1994)

Awards and highlights
- Consensus All-American (1988); First-team All-SEC (1988)

Career NFL statistics
- Rushing yards: 1,792
- Average: 3.9
- Rushing touchdowns: 8
- Stats at Pro Football Reference

Timothy Ashley Worley (born September 24, 1966) is an American former professional football player who was a running back in the National Football League (NFL). He played college football for the Georgia Bulldogs, earning consensus All-American honors in 1988. Worley was selected in the first round of the 1989 NFL draft with the seventh overall pick. He played in the NFL for the Pittsburgh Steelers and Chicago Bears.

== Early life ==
Worley was born in Lumberton, North Carolina. He attended Lumberton High School, and was recognized as a Parade magazine high school football All-American. Tim was also a high school track star as a sprinter. As a senior, he won the state titles in both the 100m & 200m dash. His personal best in the 100m dash was 10.3 and his personal best in the 200m dash was 20.85.

== College career ==
Worley began his collegiate career at the University of Georgia in 1985. He was the team's second leading rusher as a freshman with 627 yards and led the team in touchdowns with 10. That same year, he scored an 89-yard touchdown against No. 1 ranked Florida, finishing with 125 yards rushing and leading Georgia to a 24–3 upset. Worley's 1985 team was the first—and only—UGA football team to defeat the #1 ranked team in the country until 2022 when the Bulldogs defeated the No. 1 Tennessee Volunteers.

Worley's sophomore season ended early due to a torn anterior cruciate ligament. The injury was so severe that he needed almost two years of rehab, forcing him to sit out all of the 1987 season. He also became academically ineligible during that time, and worked hard at a junior college (while rehabbing his knee) to restore his grade point average, and his NCAA eligibility.

In 1988, Worley re-emerged with his focus balanced on both the books and the football field. He led Georgia in rushing with 1,216 yards, which ranks seventh among Georgia running backs for a single season. He was named first-team All-American by Kodak, the Walter Camp Football Foundation, and the Football Writers Association of America. United Press International named him its SEC Offensive Player of the Year. He finished his career at Georgia with 2,038 yards, 27 touchdowns and 5.8 yards per carry (fifth all-time at Georgia). Tim only played two full seasons, plus four games during his time at the University of Georgia.

He was selected in the first round (7th overall) of the 1989 NFL draft by the Steelers.

=== Statistics ===
	Rushing					Receiving				
Year	Att	Yds	Avg	Lng	TD	No.	Yds	Avg	Lng	TD
1985	116	627	5.4	89	9	6	86	14.3	44	1
1986	46	195	4.2	20	1	7	94	13.4	25	1
1987	—	—	—	—	—	—	—	—	—	—
1988	191	1,216	6.4	77	17	9	37	4.1	9	0
Totals	353	2,038	5.8	89	27	22	217	9.9	44	2

== NFL career ==
Worley showed promise in his rookie season, amassing 770 yards rushing and five touchdowns on 195 carries. His production fell off his second season, however, as he earned only 418 yards and no touchdowns. He was injured for most of the 1991 NFL season and was suspended the following year from the NFL due to missing two mandatory drug tests. He also had a problem holding onto the ball; he had 16 fumbles during his three-plus years in Pittsburgh.

The Steelers traded Worley to the Bears in 1993 for a fifth-round draft pick. The trade, intended to enhance the Bears' rushing attack with Neal Anderson and to resurrect Worley's career. After appearing in only five games during the 1994 NFL season, the Bears released him, and Worley chose to retire from the NFL.

=== Statistics ===
	Rushing						Receiving				
Year	Team	Att	Yds	Avg	Lng	TD	No.	Yds	Avg	Lng	TD
1989	PIT	195	770	3.9	38	5	15	113	7.5	8	0
1990	PIT	109	418	4.2	38	0	8	70	8.8	15	0
1991	PIT	22	117	5.3	16	0	0	0	0.0	9	0
1992	PIT	—	—	—	—	—	—	—	—	—	—
1993	CHI	110	437	4.0	28	2	8	49	6.1	27	0
1994	CHI	9	17	1.9	4	1	1	8	8.0	19	0
Totals	—	455	1,792	3.9	38	8	35	253	7.2	27	0

== Post NFL ==
On October 23, 2007, Worley was inducted into the Georgia-Florida Hall of Fame, which recognizes the careers and outstanding performances that have occurred during the decades-long rivalry.

Worley's troubles with the law resurfaced on April 13, 2008, as he was arrested for speeding and failure to maintain the lane in Smyrna, Georgia. It is commonly believed that Worley was arrested for driving under the influence, however he was never charged with a DUI. Officers used a Taser to subdue Worley after an altercation with the arresting officer. Police held Worley in custody on outstanding warrants from Arcade in Jackson County and Social Circle in Walton County. Worley now credits that police officer with "saving his life," and refers to the incident as the defining moment prompting his re-commitment to his faith and fueling his entrepreneurial spirit.

Worley was also inducted into the Robeson County Hall of Fame in 2011.
