= 1989 NFL season =

American football season

Regular season
- Duration: September 10 – December 25, 1989

Playoffs
- Start date: December 31, 1989
- AFC Champions: Denver Broncos
- NFC Champions: San Francisco 49ers

Super Bowl XXIV
- Date: January 28, 1990
- Site: Louisiana Superdome, New Orleans, Louisiana
- Champions: San Francisco 49ers

Pro Bowl
- Date: February 4, 1990
- Site: Aloha Stadium

AFC teams: West, Central, East
NFC teams: West, Central, East

The 1989 NFL season was the 70th regular season of the National Football League. Before the season, NFL commissioner Pete Rozelle announced his retirement. Paul Tagliabue was eventually chosen to succeed him, taking over on November 5.

Due to damage caused by the Loma Prieta earthquake to Candlestick Park, the New England Patriots at San Francisco 49ers game on October 22 was played at Stanford Stadium in Stanford.

The NFL instituted a new "free agent" system for this season, Plan B, which allowed teams to have the first chance on re-signing 37 of their players. If a team did not make a deal and that player signs elsewhere, the team would receive compensation; it would be used until 1992.

The season ended with Super Bowl XXIV where the 49ers defeated the Denver Broncos 55–10 at the Louisiana Superdome.

== Player movement ==
=== Transactions ===
- March 27: The Kansas City Chiefs sign Defensive Tackle Dan Saleaumua as a free agent.
- March 28: The Washington Redskins sign Tight End Ken Whisenhunt as a free agent. Whisenhunt would become an NFL head coach, leading the Arizona Cardinals to an appearance in Super Bowl XLIII.
- March 31: The San Francisco 49ers sign Wide Receiver Mike Sherrard as a free agent.
- April 13: The Tampa Bay Buccaneers sign Kicker John Carney as a free agent.
- June 13: The 49ers sign quarterback Steve Bono as a free agent.

=== Trades ===
- May 30, 1989: The Phoenix Cardinals traded David Treadwell to the Denver Broncos.
- June 5, 1989: The Dallas Cowboys traded Steve DeOssie to the New York Giants.
- August 7: The Dallas Cowboys trade quarterback Scott Secules to the Miami Dolphins.
- August 18: The Chicago Bears trade quarterback Jim McMahon to the San Diego Chargers
- August 30: The San Diego Chargers trade punter Ralf Mojsiejenko to Washington
- September 4: The New York Jets trade center Guy Bingham to the Atlanta Falcons.
- September 6: The Tampa Bay Buccaneers trade defensive end Ron Holmes to the Denver Broncos
- October 12, 1989: the Cowboys traded Herschel Walker to the Minnesota Vikings for a total of five players (LB Jesse Solomon, DB Issiac Holt, RB Darrin Nelson, LB David Howard, DE Alex Stewart) and six draft picks (which led to Emmitt Smith, Russell Maryland, Kevin Smith, and Darren Woodson). Scout.com says "Walker was never used properly by the coaching brain trust (a total oxymoron in this case)".

=== Draft ===
The 1989 NFL draft was held from April 23 to 24, 1989, at New York City's Marriott Marquis. With the first pick, the Dallas Cowboys selected quarterback Troy Aikman from the University of California, Los Angeles. Selecting third, the Detroit Lions drafted Barry Sanders, who would retire as the NFL's second all-time leading scorer (since broken).

== Referee changes ==
Fred Silva retired during the 1989 off-season. He joined the NFL in 1968 as a line judge before being promoted to referee in 1969. Games that he officiated include Super Bowl XIV and the Freezer Bowl.

Dale Hamer, the head linesman for Super Bowl XVII and Super Bowl XXII, and Howard Roe were promoted to referee. In addition to replacing Silva, an extra 16th officiating crew was added to help handle the weekly workload of 14 games.

Walt Coleman was hired as a line judge. He was promoted to referee in 1995 and was a crew chief through 2018.

== Major rule changes ==
- After a foul that occurs inside the last two minutes of the first half and inside the last five minutes of the second half or overtime, the game clock will start at the snap, instead of when the ball is spotted and the referee signals it is ready to be played.
- New rules were enacted, including loss of timeouts or five-yard penalties, to handle the problem of crowd noise when it becomes too loud for the offensive team to hear its signals.
- If a receiver and a defender eventually establish joint control of a pass, the ball will be awarded to whoever was the first player to establish control of the ball.
- While not a rule "change" per se, the "hurry up offense" was recognized as fully legal, and penalties for delay of game would be called against teams whose defenders faked injuries in order to slow down the tempo, unless those teams called for timeouts.

== 1989 deaths ==
- Jim Lansford died on January 17, 1989.
- Charley Long: A member of the Patriots' All-1960s (AFL) Team, Long died on December 16, 1989.
- John Matuszak: On June 17, Matuszak, a member of the Oakland Raiders Super Bowl XI and Super Bowl XV championship teams, died of an accidental propoxyphene overdose.
- Carl Monroe: On April 26, 1989, Monroe, a member of the San Francisco 49ers Super Bowl XIX championship team, was found dead at his home at 7:58 a.m.
- Steve Moore: Moore, a New England Patriots 1983 NFL draft selection, was shot and killed in October 1989, following a robbery outside a convenience store in Memphis.
- Wayne Moore: A member of the 1972 Miami Dolphins Super Bowl VII championship team; Moore suffered a heart attack at his home in Miami on August 19, 1989, and was pronounced dead at Coral Reef Hospital that afternoon.
- Sherman Plunkett: A member of the Baltimore Colts' NFL championship teams in 1958 and 1959, Plunkett died on November 18, 1989.
- Frank Sinkovitz: Having served as an NFL umpire from 1958 to 1983, Sinkovitz also played for the Pittsburgh Steelers from 1947 to 1952. An official for Super Bowl XV, he died on August 6, 1989.
- Stumpy Thomason: A former quarterback for the Philadelphia Eagles, Thomas died on April 30, 1989.
- Tommy Thompson: A quarterback for the Pittsburgh Steelers and Philadelphia Eagles during the World War II era, died on April 22, 1989.
- Chuck Tollefson: A member of the Green Bay Packers 1944 NFL Championship Game team, Tollefson died on August 20, 1989.
- Stacey Toran
- Ossie Wiberg: Having played in 44 NFL games between 1927 and 1932, Wiberg died on August 14, 1989.
- On November 24, Atlanta Falcons offensive tackle Ralph Norwood was killed in an automobile accident eight miles from the Falcons' training facilities.
- On December 19, Falcons backup tight end Brad Beckman was also killed in an auto accident.

== Preseason ==
=== American Bowl ===
A series of National Football League pre-season exhibition games that were held at sites outside the United States, a pair of games in 1989 were contested in London, England and Tokyo, Japan.

Date	Winning team	Score	Losing team	Score	Stadium	City
August 6, 1989	Los Angeles Rams	16	San Francisco 49ers	13	Tokyo Dome	(Japan) Tokyo
August 6, 1989	Philadelphia Eagles	17	Cleveland Browns	13	Wembley Stadium	(United Kingdom) London

=== Hall of Fame Game ===
The Pro Football Hall of Fame Game, in which the Washington Redskins defeated the Buffalo Bills 31–6, was played on August 5, televised nationally by ABC and held at Fawcett Stadium in Canton, Ohio, the same city where the league was founded. The 1989 Hall of Fame Class included Mel Blount and Terry Bradshaw, teammates on four Super Bowl championship teams with the Pittsburgh Steelers in the 1970s, Art Shell, a member of the Oakland Raiders Super Bowl XI and Super Bowl XV teams, plus Willie Wood, who captured five NFL championships, including Super Bowl I and Super Bowl II with the Green Bay Packers.

== Regular season ==
=== Scheduling formula ===
Inter-conference
AFC East vs NFC West
AFC Central vs NFC Central
AFC West vs NFC East

Highlights of the 1989 season included:

- Thanksgiving: Two games were played on Thursday, November 23, featuring Cleveland at Detroit and Philadelphia at Dallas, with Detroit and Philadelphia winning.
- Christmas: For the first time, regular season game was held on Christmas Day, as Cincinnati visited Minnesota, for a Monday Night Football contest on ABC, with Minnesota winning.

=== Final standings ===
AFC East
	W	L	T	PCT	DIV	CONF	PF	PA	STK
^{(3)} Buffalo Bills	9	7	0	.563	6–2	8–4	409	317	W1
Indianapolis Colts	8	8	0	.500	4–4	7–5	298	301	L1
Miami Dolphins	8	8	0	.500	4–4	6–8	331	379	L2
New England Patriots	5	11	0	.313	4–4	5–7	297	391	L3
New York Jets	4	12	0	.250	2–6	3–9	253	411	L3

AFC Central
	W	L	T	PCT	DIV	CONF	PF	PA	STK
^{(2)} Cleveland Browns	9	6	1	.594	3–3	6–5–1	334	254	W2
^{(4)} Houston Oilers	9	7	0	.563	3–3	6–6	365	412	L2
^{(5)} Pittsburgh Steelers	9	7	0	.563	1–5	6–6	265	326	W3
Cincinnati Bengals	8	8	0	.500	5–1	6–6	404	285	L1

AFC West
	W	L	T	PCT	DIV	CONF	PF	PA	STK
^{(1)} Denver Broncos	11	5	0	.688	6–2	9–3	362	226	L1
Kansas City Chiefs	8	7	1	.531	3–5	6–7–1	307	286	W1
Los Angeles Raiders	8	8	0	.500	3–5	6–6	315	297	L2
Seattle Seahawks	7	9	0	.438	4–4	7–5	241	327	L1
San Diego Chargers	6	10	0	.375	4–4	4–8	266	290	W2

NFC East
	W	L	T	PCT	DIV	CONF	PF	PA	STK
^{(2)} New York Giants	12	4	0	.750	6–2	8–4	348	252	W3
^{(4)} Philadelphia Eagles	11	5	0	.688	7–1	8–4	342	274	W1
Washington Redskins	10	6	0	.625	4–4	8–4	386	308	W5
Phoenix Cardinals	5	11	0	.313	2–6	4–8	258	377	L6
Dallas Cowboys	1	15	0	.063	1–7	1–13	204	393	L7

NFC Central
	W	L	T	PCT	DIV	CONF	PF	PA	STK
^{(3)} Minnesota Vikings	10	6	0	.625	6–2	8–4	351	275	W1
Green Bay Packers	10	6	0	.625	5–3	10–4	362	356	W2
Detroit Lions	7	9	0	.438	4–4	6–6	312	364	W5
Chicago Bears	6	10	0	.375	2–6	4–8	358	377	L6
Tampa Bay Buccaneers	5	11	0	.313	3–5	5–7	320	419	L4

NFC West
	W	L	T	PCT	DIV	CONF	PF	PA	STK
^{(1)} San Francisco 49ers	14	2	0	.875	5–1	10–2	442	253	W5
^{(5)} Los Angeles Rams	11	5	0	.688	4–2	8–4	426	344	W2
New Orleans Saints	9	7	0	.563	3–3	5–7	386	301	W3
Atlanta Falcons	3	13	0	.188	0–6	1–11	279	437	L7

=== Tiebreakers ===
- Indianapolis finished ahead of Miami in the AFC East based on better conference record (7–5 vs. Dolphins' 6–8).
- Houston finished ahead of Pittsburgh in the AFC Central based on head-to-head sweep (2–0).
- Philadelphia was first NFC Wild Card ahead of L.A. Rams based on better record against common opponents (7–3 to Rams' 5–4).
- Minnesota finished ahead of Green Bay in the NFC Central based on better division record (6–2 vs. Packers' 5–3).

== Playoffs ==
Note: The San Francisco 49ers (the NFC 1 seed) did not play the Los Angeles Rams (the 5 seed) in the Divisional playoff round because both teams were in the same division.

Jan 7 – Giants Stadium
5	LA Rams	19*
Dec 31 – Veterans Stadium	Jan. 14 – Candlestick Park
2	NY Giants	13
NFC
5	LA Rams	21	5	LA Rams	3
Jan 6 – Candlestick Park
4	Philadelphia	7	1	San Francisco	30
NFC Championship
3	Minnesota	13
Jan 28 – Louisiana Superdome
1	San Francisco	41
Divisional round
Wild-card round	N1	San Francisco	55
Jan 6 – Cleveland Stadium
A1	Denver	10
Super Bowl XXIV
3	Buffalo	30
Dec 31 – Astrodome	Jan. 14 – Mile High Stadium
2	Cleveland	34
AFC
5	Pittsburgh	26*	2	Cleveland	21
Jan 7 – Mile High Stadium
4	Houston	23	1	Denver	37
AFC Championship
5	Pittsburgh	23
1	Denver	24

* Indicates overtime victory

== Statistical leaders ==
=== Team ===
Points scored	San Francisco 49ers (442)
Total yards gained	San Francisco 49ers (6,268)
Yards rushing	Cincinnati Bengals (2,483)
Yards passing	Washington Redskins (4,349)
Fewest points allowed	Denver Broncos (226)
Fewest total yards allowed	Minnesota Vikings (4,184)
Fewest rushing yards allowed	New Orleans Saints (1,326)
Fewest passing yards allowed	Minnesota Vikings (2,501)

== Awards ==
Most Valuable Player	Joe Montana, quarterback, San Francisco
Coach of the Year	Lindy Infante, Green Bay
Offensive Player of the Year	Joe Montana, quarterback, San Francisco
Defensive Player of the Year	Keith Millard, defensive tackle, Minnesota
Offensive Rookie of the Year	Barry Sanders, running back, Detroit
Defensive Rookie of the Year	Derrick Thomas, linebacker, Kansas City
NFL Comeback Player of the Year	Ottis Anderson, running back, NY Giants
NFL Man of the Year	Warren Moon, quarterback, Houston
Super Bowl Most Valuable Player	Joe Montana, quarterback, San Francisco

== Coaching changes ==
=== Offseason ===
- Cleveland Browns: Marty Schottenheimer left the Browns to coach the Kansas City Chiefs. The Browns turned to Bud Carson to replace Schottenheimer.
- Dallas Cowboys: In a highly publicized move shortly after taking over, the Cowboys' new ownership fired Tom Landry, the team's only head coach in franchise history. Jimmy Johnson, who lead the Miami Hurricanes to a college football national championship in 1987, was named as Landry's replacement.
- Detroit Lions: Wayne Fontes began his first full season as head coach after replacing Darryl Rogers, who was fired after 11 games in 1988.
- Kansas City Chiefs: Frank Gansz was fired. Marty Schottenheimer then joined the Chiefs after leaving the Browns.
- San Diego Chargers: Al Saunders was replaced by Dan Henning.
- San Francisco 49ers: Bill Walsh retired after the team's 1988 NFL/Super Bowl championship. Defensive coordinator George Seifert was promoted to head coach.

=== In-season ===
- Atlanta Falcons: Marion Campbell's second tenure with the Falcons ended when he was fired after the first 12 games, and former St. Louis Cardinals coach Jim Hanifan served as interim for the final four games.
- Los Angeles Raiders: Mike Shanahan was fired after the first four games. Assistant coach Art Shell served as interim for the last 12 games. Shell was given the position permanently and held it through 1994, then returned for one season in 2006.
- Phoenix Cardinals: Gene Stallings was fired after the first 11 games after announcing he would resign at the end of the season, and Hank Kuhlmann served as interim for the final five games. Stallings became coach of the Alabama Crimson Tide, where he won the 1992 national championship.

== Uniform changes ==
- The Dallas Cowboys removed the elliptical blue circles with the player's number from the hip area of the pants.
- The Green Bay Packers removed the "G" helmet monogram from the striping of the jersey sleeves.
- The Kansas City Chiefs began wearing their white pants with their white jerseys, discontinuing their red pants. It was the first time the Chiefs wore white pants with their white jerseys since 1967. The red pants returned in 2000.
- The Miami Dolphins introduced aqua pants to be worn with their white jerseys. They were not worn again in 1989 after a 39–7 loss at Houston in week four, but returned full-time in 1990.
- The Phoenix Cardinals added the flag of Arizona, being superimposed on the sleeve stripes of their white jerseys.
- The San Francisco 49ers added black trim on the SF logo on helmets.

== Television ==
This was the third and final year under the league's broadcast contracts with ABC, CBS, NBC, and ESPN to televise Monday Night Football, the NFC package, the AFC package, and Sunday Night Football, respectively. O. J. Simpson was named as the sole studio analyst for NBC's NFL Live!, joining host Bob Costas. NBC also hired the then-recently retired head coach Bill Walsh to join Dick Enberg on the network's lead broadcast team, replacing Merlin Olsen as the network's lead color commentator; Olsen left for CBS after this season.
