= Clay Matthews =

Clay Matthews may refer to any one of three generations of American football players:

- Clay Matthews Sr. (1928–2017), former offensive tackle for the San Francisco 49ers
- Clay Matthews Jr. (born 1956), former linebacker for the Cleveland Browns and Atlanta Falcons, son of former
- Clay Matthews III (born 1986), former linebacker for the Green Bay Packers and Los Angeles Rams, son of former
