= Matthews family =

Prominent family of professional American football players

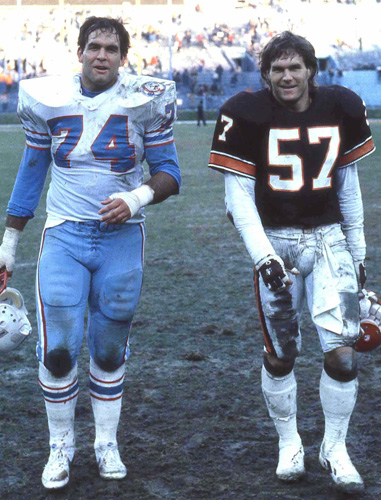
Brothers Bruce (left) and Clay Jr. (right) in 1984

The Matthews family is a prominent family in American football. One of only a few third-generation families to play in the National Football League (NFL), it is often called the "NFL's First Family". Its seven members who have played in the NFL have a combined 25 Pro Bowl invitations, 11 first-team All-Pro selections, and three Super Bowl appearances. The family’s patriarch, H. L. Matthews, played minor league baseball and coached several college sports. His son Clay, though, established the family’s legacy in the NFL, playing four seasons for the San Francisco 49ers in the 1950s. Clay’s two sons, Bruce and Clay Jr., both played college football for the USC Trojans, and both were drafted in the first round of their respective drafts (1978 and 1983). Both enjoyed long, successful careers in the NFL, with Bruce being elected to the Pro Football Hall of Fame in 2007. Clay Jr. and Bruce both had multiple children play in the NFL, including Clay Matthews III and Jake Matthews.

== History ==
The Matthews family is one of only a few third-generation families to play in the NFL. Because of the success of its members, including 25 Pro Bowl invitations, 11 first-team All-Pro selections, three Super Bowl appearances, and a Pro Football Hall of Fame inductee, the family has been called the "NFL's First Family".

=== First generation ===
The family patriarch, H. L. Matthews, was born in Jeffersonville, Ohio, in 1889. He played Minor League Baseball for several South Atlantic League teams from 1912 through 1915. He enlisted in the United States Army after World War I began, where he began boxing. After the war, he returned to baseball for the 1922 season and briefly pursued a career as a stock market telegrapher. In 1925, Matthews began coaching athletics at The Citadel. He rotated as coach of baseball, track and field, and boxing there from 1926 to 1941. Matthews was part of the inaugural class of inductees into The Citadel Athletic Hall of Fame in 1977. He was also inducted in the Carolinas Boxing Hall of Fame in 2005.

=== Second generation ===
Clay Matthews Sr. began the family's legacy in the NFL.

H. L. Matthews' son, Clay Matthews Sr., began the family's legacy in football. After playing football in college for the Georgia Tech Yellow Jackets, he was drafted in the 1949 NFL draft by the Los Angeles Rams, but never played for the team. Matthews Sr. instead joined the San Francisco 49ers in 1950 and played offensive tackle, defensive tackle, and defensive end. His career was interrupted by the Korean War, in which he served as a paratrooper. He rejoined the 49ers in 1953 and played for three more seasons before retiring. After his football career, he worked for Bell & Howell, ultimately becoming its president. Matthews Sr. died on March 24, 2017, aged 88.

=== Third generation ===
Two of Matthews Sr.'s sons played in the NFL: Clay Matthews Jr. and Bruce Matthews. Each played college football for the USC Trojans, and they were both selected in the first round of their respective drafts; Clay Jr. in 1978 and Bruce in 1983. Clay Jr. was a linebacker for the Cleveland Browns from 1978 to 1993 and Atlanta Falcons from 1994 to 1996. With the Browns, he played in four Pro Bowls and in 1984 was a first-team All-Pro selection. Bruce, a highly versatile offensive lineman, played guard, tackle, center, and long snapper, for the Houston Oilers (who changed their name to the Tennessee Oilers and then the Tennessee Titans during his tenrue) from 1983 to 2001. He was selected to 14 Pro Bowls and was a 9-time first-team All-Pro selection. Bruce was inducted into the Pro Football Hall of Fame in 2007. Clay Jr. and Bruce are the only brothers to play on the same Pro Bowl team, doing so for the American Football Conference in both 1988 and 1989.

=== Fourth generation ===
Three sons of Clay Jr. have played football past the high school level: Kyle, Clay III, and Casey. The oldest, Kyle, was a safety for the USC Trojans. Clay III, a linebacker, also played for the Trojans. Clay III was drafted by Green Bay Packers in 2009, with whom he has earned six Pro Bowl selections, a victory in Super Bowl XLV, appeared in three NFC Championship Games (most recently in the 2016 NFC Championship Game where he faced off against his cousin Jake), and is the franchise's all-time sack leader. In 2024, he was elected to the Green Bay Packers Hall of Fame. Casey played linebacker for the Oregon Ducks, where he was a first-team All-Pac-12 and second-team All-American in 2010, after which he played in the NFL for the Philadelphia Eagles from 2011 to 2014 and Minnesota Vikings in 2015.

Bruce has seven children, including five sons, two of whom have played in the NFL: Kevin and Jake. Kevin was a center for the Titans, Washington Redskins, and Carolina Panthers from 2010 to 2014. Jake has been an offensive tackle for the Falcons since being drafted by the team sixth overall in 2014. In the 2016 NFC Championship Game, he and the Falcons defeated his cousin Clay III and the Packers to advance to Super Bowl LI. A third brother, Mike, has spent time on off-season rosters of the Cleveland Browns, Pittsburgh Steelers and Miami Dolphins. A fourth brother, Luke, played for the Texas A&M Aggies, the same program that three of his older brothers also represented.

==== Extended family ====
Troy Niklas, the nephew of Bruce Matthews by way of Bruce's wife's sister, is a former tight end for the Arizona Cardinals.

Professional soccer player Ashley Nick is a granddaughter of Clay Matthews Sr.

== Matthews family tree ==
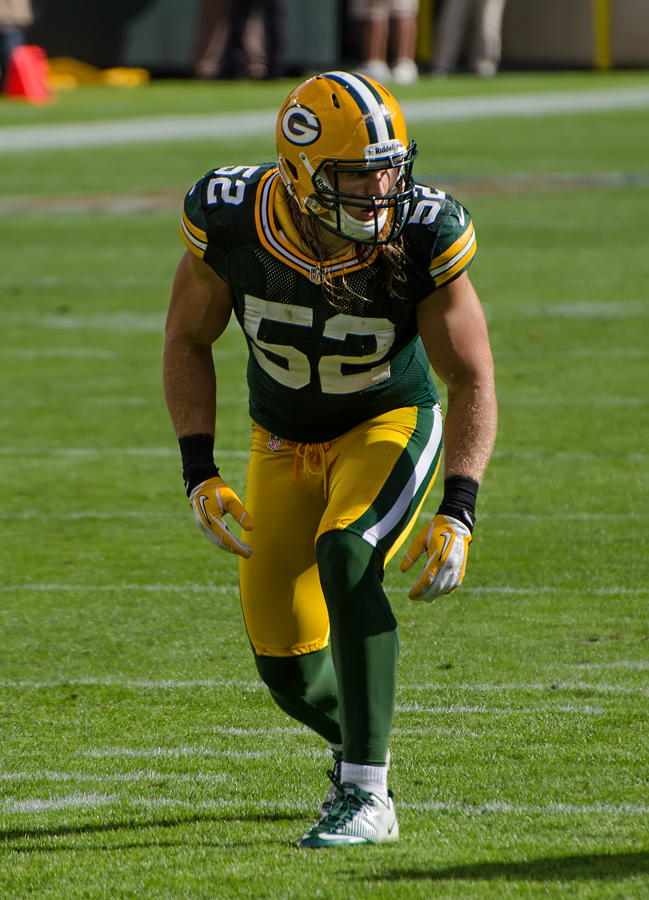
Clay Matthews III played in the NFL for 11 seasons.

- H. L. "Matty" Matthews (1889–1975)
  - Clay Matthews Sr. (1928–2017)
    - Clay Matthews Jr. (born 1956)
      - Jennifer Matthews
      - Kyle Matthews (born 1982)
      - Brian Matthews
      - Clay Matthews III (born 1986)
      - Casey Matthews (born 1989)
    - Bruce Matthews (born 1961)
      - Steven Matthews
      - Kevin Matthews (born 1987)
      - Marilyn Matthews
      - Jake Matthews (born 1992)
      - Mike Matthews (born 1994)
      - Luke Matthews (born 2000)
      - Gwen Matthews

== In media ==
In 2017, Clay Jr., Clay III, and Casey were featured in a commercial for PlayStation Vue entitled "Football VUEing Family", which was filmed at Clay Jr.'s home in Southern California. Also in the commercial were Clay Jr.'s wife Leslie and daughter Jennifer.

== See also ==
- List of family relations in American football
