= Jake Matthews (American football) =

American football player (born 1992)

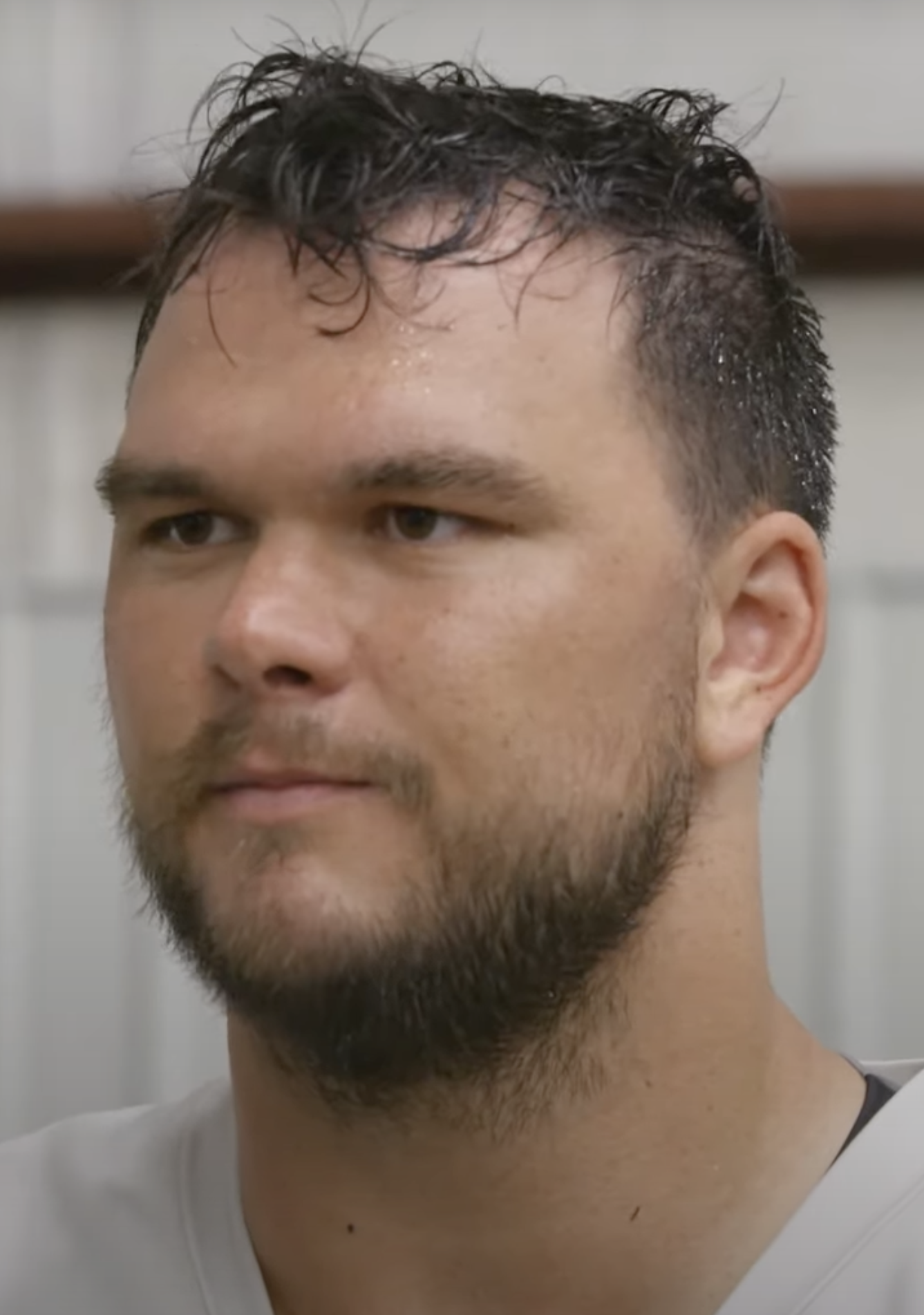
- Matthews in 2021

No. 70 – Atlanta Falcons
- Position: Offensive tackle
- Roster status: Active

Personal information
- Born: February 11, 1992 (age 34); Missouri City, Texas, U.S.
- Listed height: 6 ft 5 in (1.96 m)
- Listed weight: 310 lb (141 kg)

Career information
- High school: Elkins (Missouri City)
- College: Texas A&M (2010–2013)
- NFL draft: 2014: 1st round, 6th overall pick

Career history
- Atlanta Falcons (2014–present)

Awards and highlights
- Pro Bowl (2018); Unanimous All-American (2013); First-team All-American (2012); Jacobs Blocking Trophy (2013); 2× First-team All-SEC (2012, 2013)

Career NFL statistics as of Week 10, 2026
- Games played: 206
- Games started: 206
- Stats at Pro Football Reference

Jacob Thomas Matthews (born February 11, 1992) is an American professional football offensive tackle for the Atlanta Falcons of the National Football League (NFL). He played college football for the Texas A&M Aggies and was drafted by the Falcons sixth overall in the 2014 NFL draft. Matthews is a member of the Matthews family of football players.

== Early life ==
Matthews attended Elkins High School in Missouri City, where he was a standout offensive lineman for the Elkins Knights high school football team. Matthews was teammates with D. J. Hayden. As a senior, he was a first-team all-district and all-greater Houston honoree as his team finished the season with a 9–3 record. Matthews was invited to play in the 2010 U.S. Army All-American Bowl and also earned 2009 High School All-American honors by USA Today, Parade, and SuperPrep.

Regarded as a four-star recruit by Rivals.com, Matthews was listed as the No. 7 offensive tackle prospect in the class of 2010. He chose Texas A&M over offers from Oklahoma, Alabama, Arkansas, Oregon, Texas, Texas Tech, Southern California, and Stanford.

== College career ==
As a junior in 2012, Matthews was a first-team All-Southeastern Conference (SEC) selection in recognition of his successful season. He also received first-team All-American honors by the Football Writers Association of America. During his senior season, Matthews played left tackle after playing right tackle for the previous three seasons.

As a senior in 2013, Matthews was again a first-team All-SEC selection.

== Professional career ==
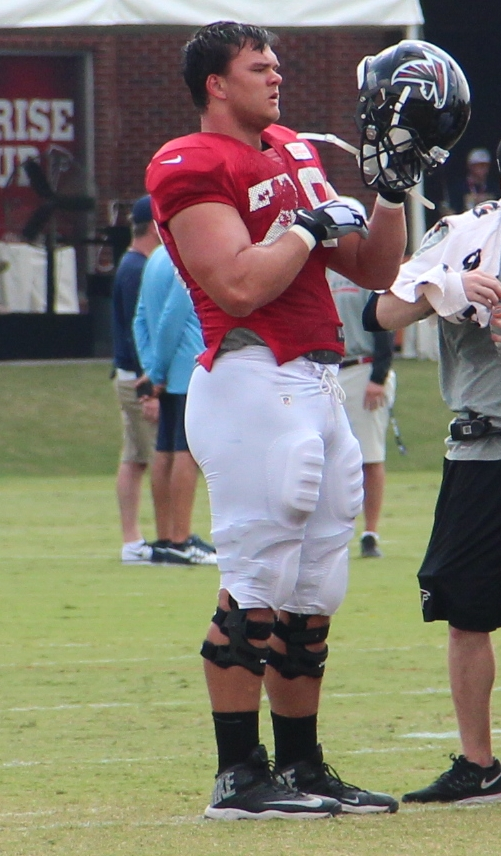
Matthews during training camp in 2014

Matthews was selected by the Atlanta Falcons with the sixth overall pick in the 2014 NFL draft. With Luke Joeckel having been selected second overall in the 2013 NFL draft by the Jacksonville Jaguars, Texas A&M became the first school with consecutive top-10 selected offensive lineman since USC's Tyron Smith and Matt Kalil in 2011 and 2012, respectively.

Pre-draft measurables
Height	Weight	Arm length	Hand span	Wingspan	40-yard dash	10-yard split	20-yard split	20-yard shuttle	Three-cone drill	Vertical jump	Broad jump	Bench press
6 ft 5 1/2 in (1.97 m)	308 lb (140 kg)	33 3/8 in (0.85 m)	9 7/8 in (0.25 m)	6 ft 7 1/2 in (2.02 m)	5.07 s	1.75 s	2.94 s	4.47 s	7.34 s	30.5 in (0.77 m)	8 ft 9 in (2.67 m)	24 reps
All values from NFL Combine

In his first NFL game, Matthews suffered a high ankle sprain in a season-opening victory over the New Orleans Saints. Despite the injury, Matthews started in all but one game in his rookie season. In 2015, Matthews' blocking improved, allowing only 38 quarterback pressures compared to 51 in 2014. That season, Matthews was named the third most improved player of 2015 by Pro Football Focus.

In the 2016 season, Matthews and the Falcons won the NFC Championship against the Green Bay Packers, 44-21, with Matthews facing off against his cousin Clay Matthews III. In Super Bowl LI, the Falcons faced the New England Patriots where, Matthews played every offensive snap, as the Falcons lost in overtime to the Patriots, 34–28, giving up a 28–3 lead. With the Falcons leading, 28–20, with less than five minutes left in the fourth quarter, Matthews was flagged for offensive holding following a sack, both of which proved costly in the end, as they pushed the Falcons out of field goal range, thereby erasing an opportunity for them to put the game away.

On April 25, 2017, the Falcons picked up the fifth-year option on Matthews' contract. He started all 16 games at left tackle for the third straight year for the Falcons in 2017.

On July 27, 2018, Matthews signed a five-year, $75 million contract extension with the Falcons. On January 23, 2019, Matthews was named to his first Pro Bowl, as a replacement for Redskins offensive tackle Trent Williams.

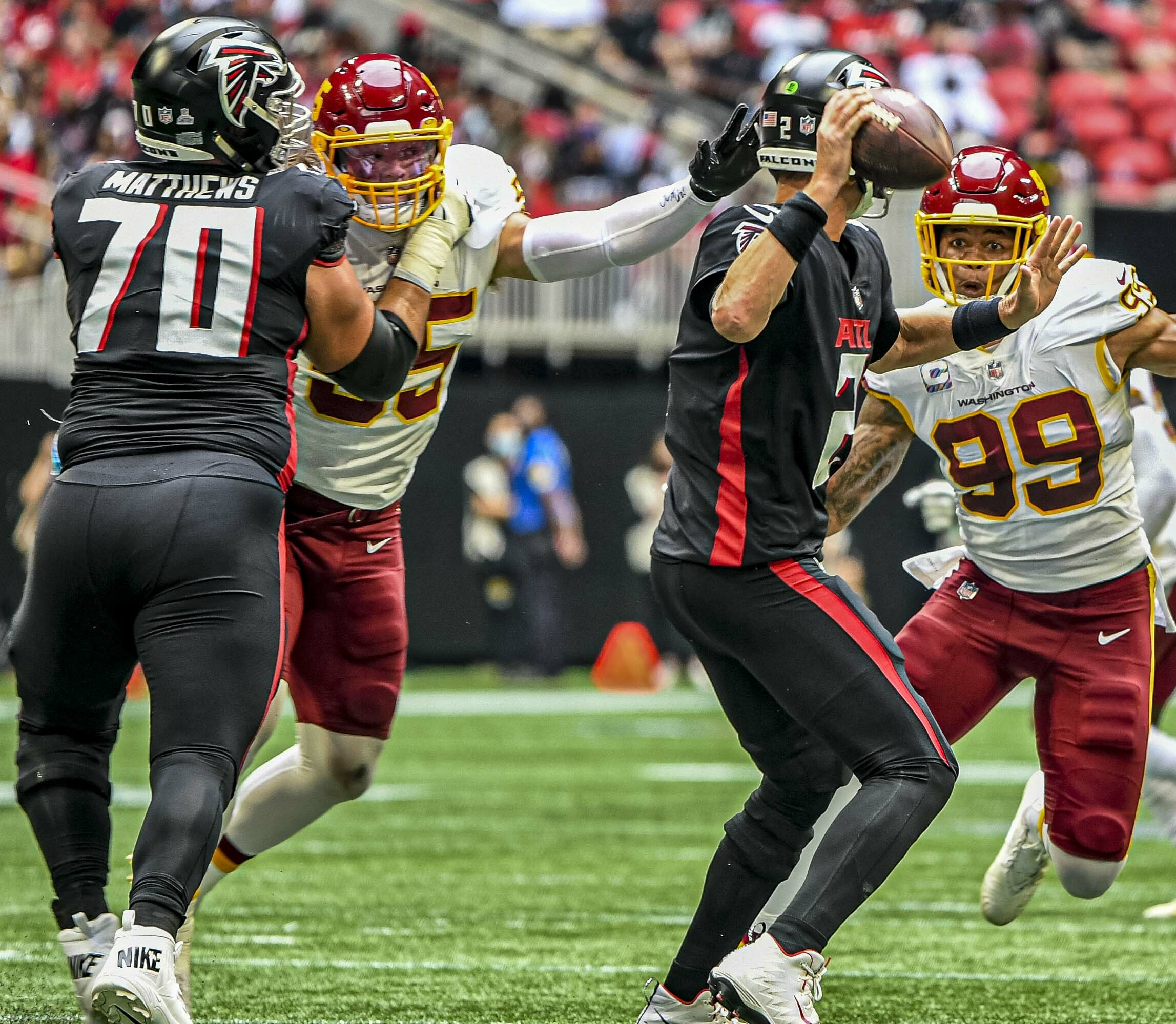
Matthews (left) playing against the Washington Football Team in 2021

During the 2020 season, Matthews played in all 16 games, allowing only three sacks, six quarterback hits, and three total penalties on 1,113 offensive snaps. For his 2020 performance, he earned a 75.5 overall Pro Football Focus grade, with a 84.0 grade in pass blocking and 57.4 grade in run blocking. His pass blocking ranked 9th among all tackles in the NFL and his run blocking ranked 47th. The 75.5 overall grade was the lowest he had received since the 2016 season. As of the end of the 2024 season, Matthews has played at least 1,000 snaps every season since 2015.

On March 14, 2022, Matthews signed a three-year, $52.5 million extension with the Falcons. By the end of November 2022, Matthews started 138 consecutive regular season games, the longest active streak for a left tackle in the NFL. By the end of the 2024 season, Matthews has started 174 consecutive regular season games at left tackle for the Falcons, by far the longest active streak in professional football.

On March 9, 2025, Matthews and the Falcons agreed to a two-year, $45 million contract extension.

== Personal life ==
Matthews was born in Houston, Texas. He is the son of Pro Football Hall of Famer Bruce Matthews and the younger brother of Kevin Matthews, a center who also played for the Aggies and last played for the Carolina Panthers in 2015. His younger brother, Mike, last played center for the Miami Dolphins, and another younger brother, Luke, only played for the Aggies. He is also the cousin of former linebacker Clay Matthews III, who spent the majority of his career playing for the Green Bay Packers, and Casey Matthews, a linebacker who last played for the Minnesota Vikings. He is the nephew of NFL veteran Clay Matthews Jr., the grandson of NFL veteran Clay Matthews Sr., and the great-grandson of H. L. Matthews.
