= List of NFL career games played leaders =

Playing in the NFL is one of the most physically demanding sports. The players are exposed to many hard hits and are often injured. This plus given the fact the NFL is highly competitive, and there is a large group of talented players wanting to take the place of those who are injured or no longer able to perform at a high level, most careers are not long. The average length of a player's career in the National Football League is relatively short compared to other sports. One study shows the average career lasts around 3.3 years. Kickers and punters careers average 4.87 seasons. On the other end, the shortest average careers are the running backs, only 2.57 seasons. According to data compiled by another study, quarterbacks and offensive linemen are next on the list with average career spans of 4.44 and 3.63 seasons, respectively. Defensive linemen usually have longer careers than linebackers and cornerbacks. Wide receivers careers average just above running backs at 2.81 seasons

Some players avoid injury and maintain their high skill level. The following list has the top 250 players who have the most regular season game appearances. All have played at least a dozen seasons in the league. One player, George Blanda played in 4 decades from the 1940s to the 1970s. Blanda played 26 seasons and was 48 years old when he retired.

== All-time most appearances ==
Regular season only: (includes NFL, AFL, and AAFC games)

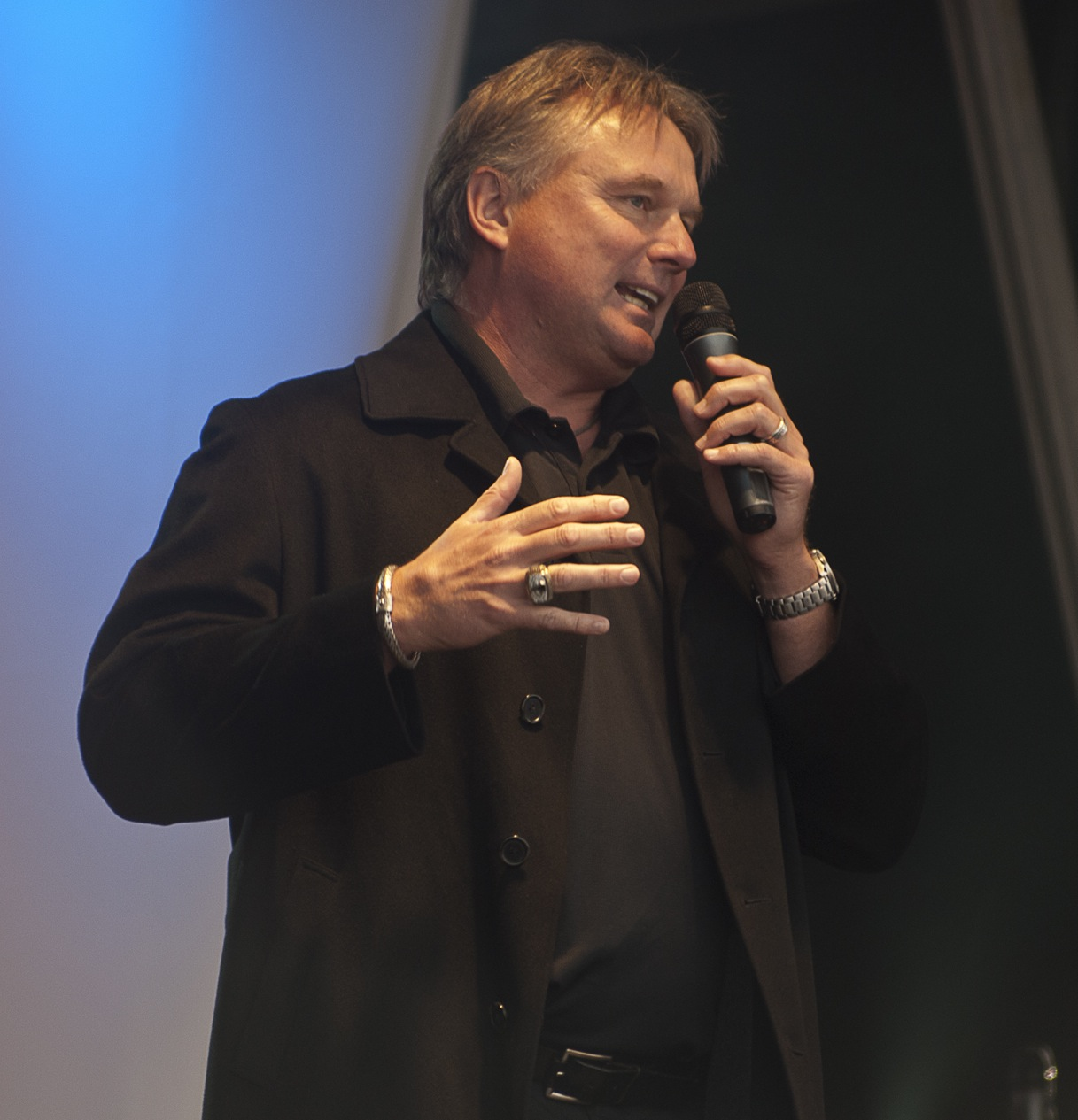
Morten Andersen played in 382 NFL games, more than any other player.

Positions played
C	Center	G	Guard	NT	Nose Tackle	QB	Quarterback
CB	Cornerback	K	Placekicker	OL	Off. Lineman	RB	Running Back
DE	Defensive End	KR	Kick Returner	OT	Off. Tackle	S	Safety
DT	Defensive Tackle	LB	Linebacker	P	Punter	TE	Tight End
FB	Fullback	LS	Long Snapper	PR	Punt Returner	WR	Wide Receiver

If more than one position is listed for a player, the BOLD listing is his primary position. This list is sorted by 1) games played, 2) first year played, 3) last year played

**Bold** denotes an active player	Most games for that position^	Elected into the Pro Football Hall of Fame*

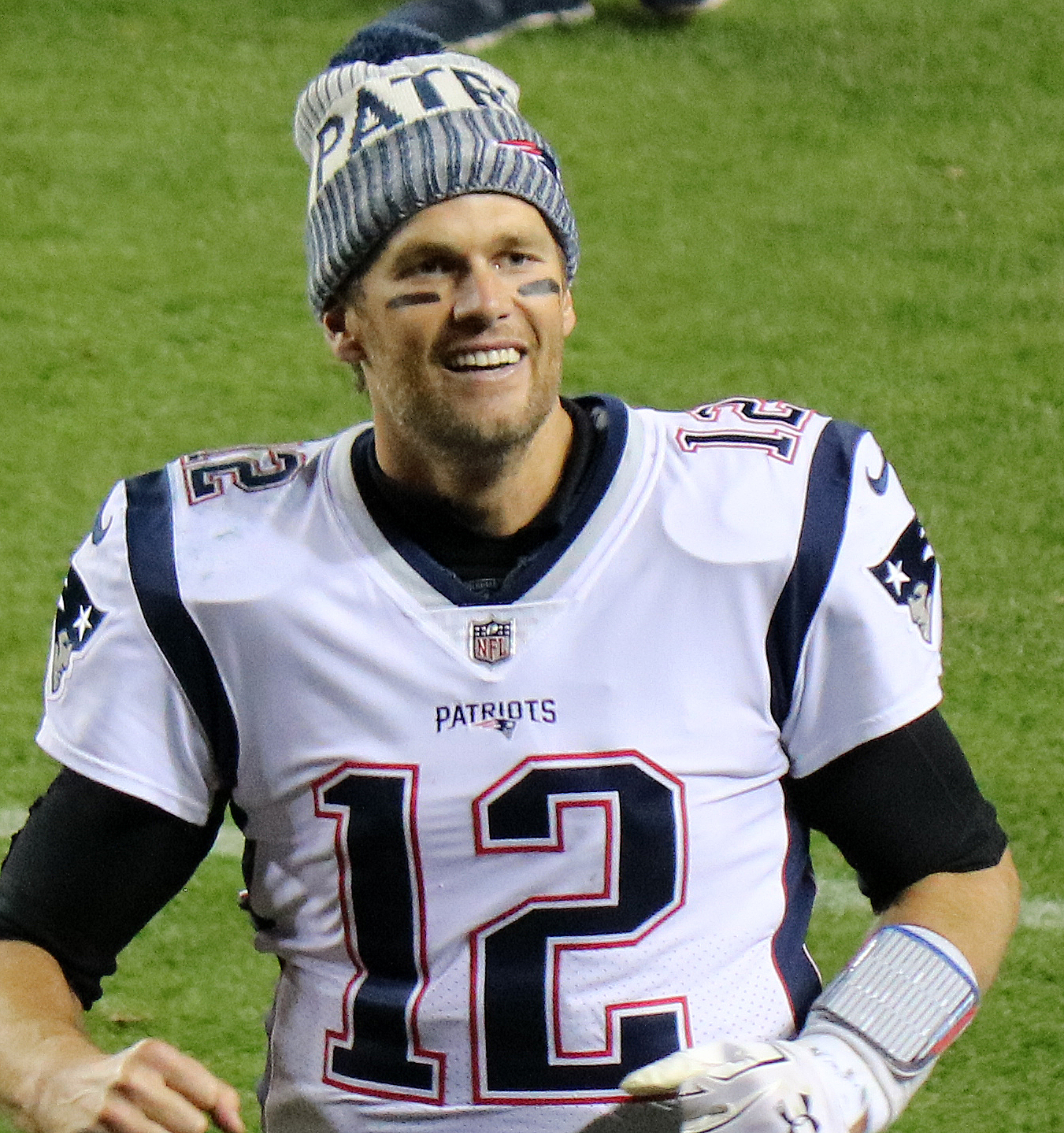
Tom Brady has played the most NFL games at quarterback, 335.

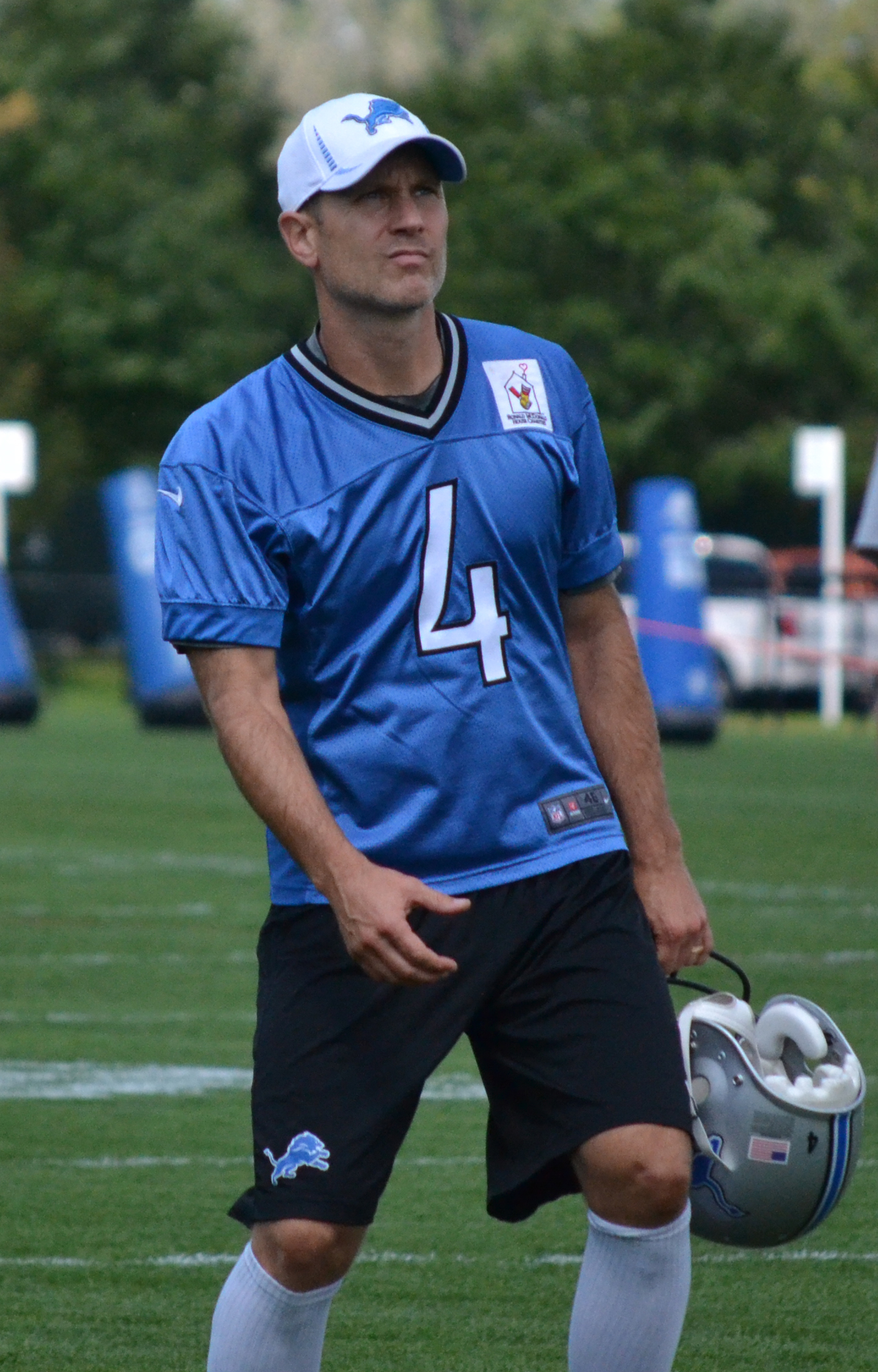
Jason Hanson holds the NFL record of 21 seasons with the same team as placekicker for the Lions.

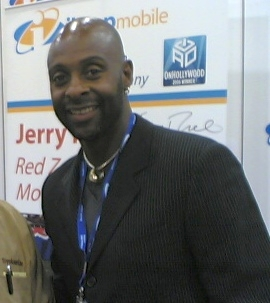
Jerry Rice played 303 games as a wide receiver, an NFL record.

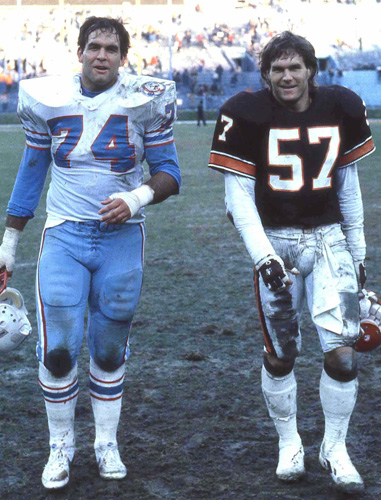
Bruce Matthews (left) played a record 296 games as an offensive lineman. His brother Clay (right) holds the record for games at linebacker.

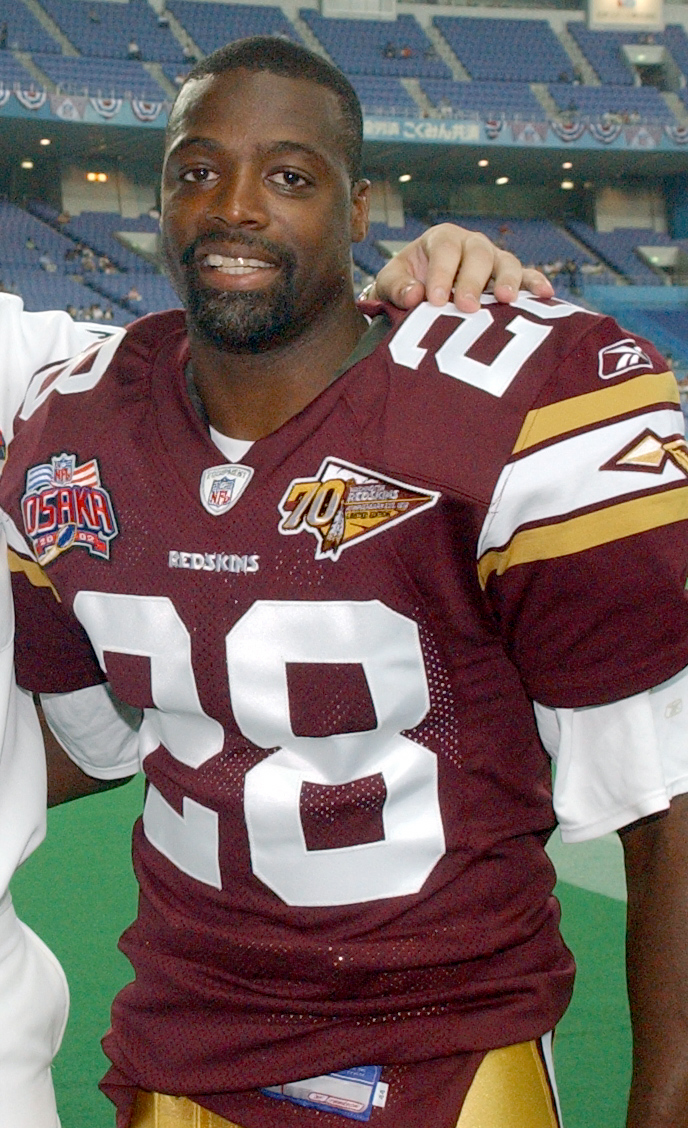
No one has played more games at the cornerback position than Darrell Green

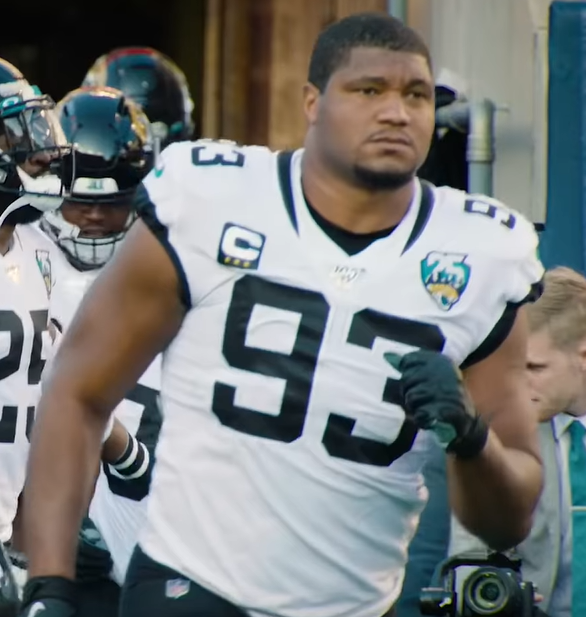
Calais Campbell holds the record for most games played at defensive end, 287.

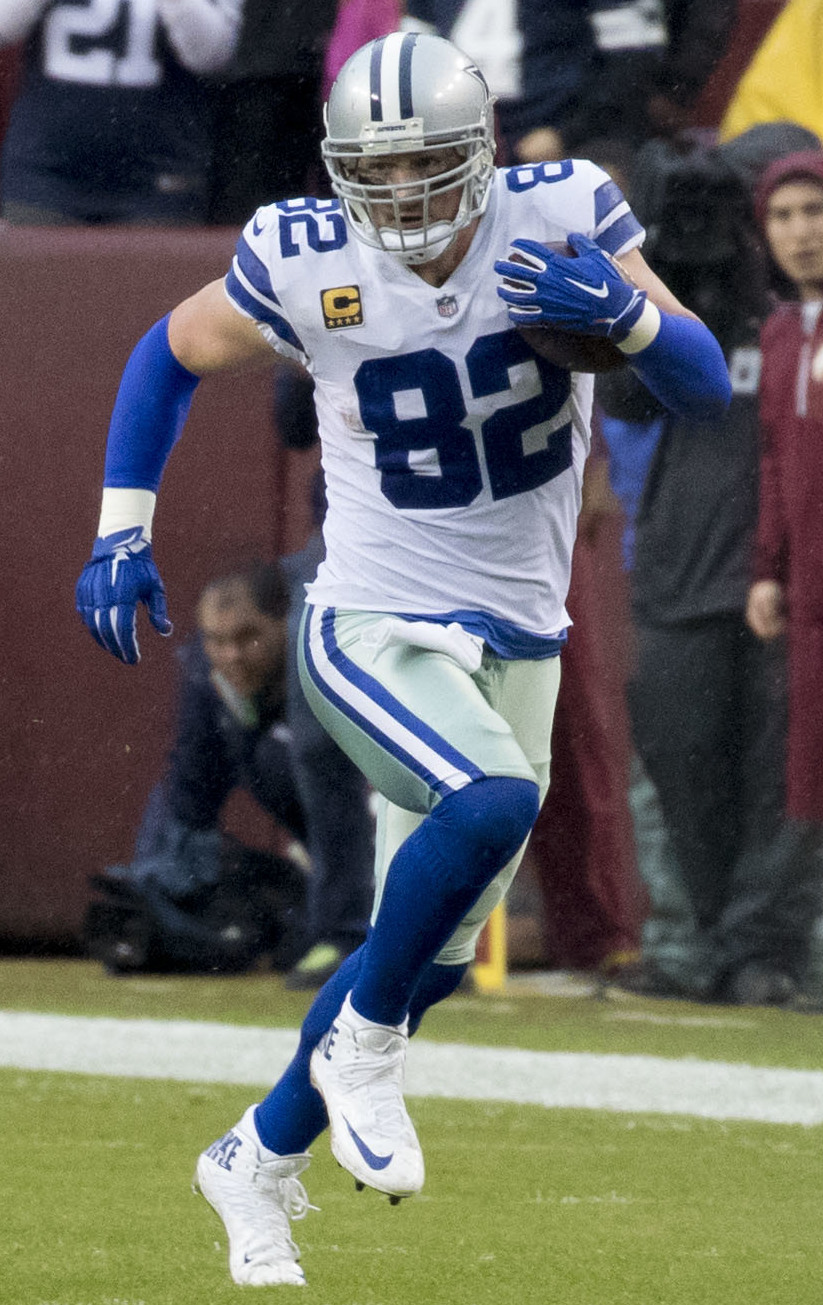
Jason Witten is second for longevity record for tight ends with 271 games played.

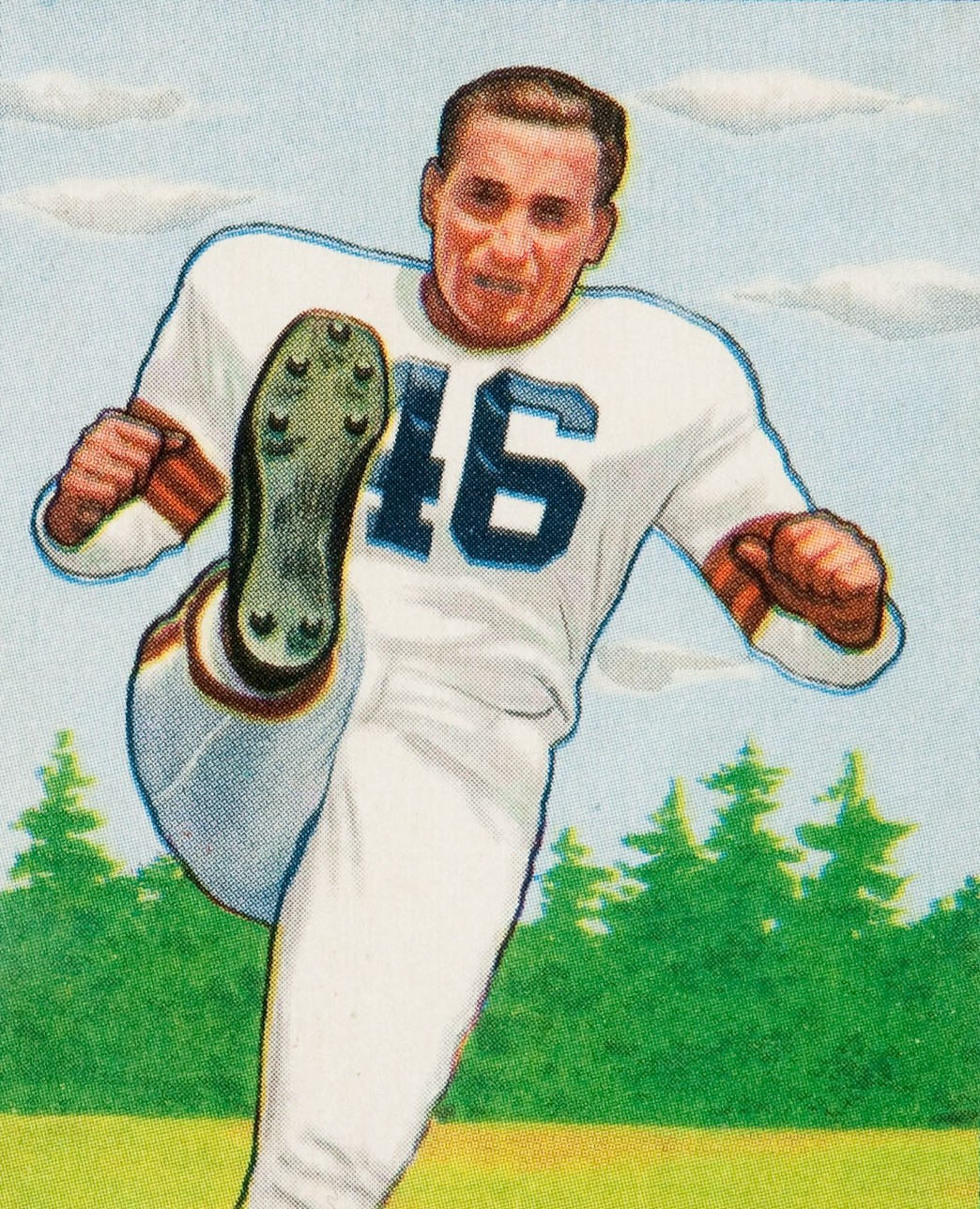
Lou Groza, who set the standard for longevity, was both an offensive tackle (1946-59) and kicker (1961-67) for 268 games from the 1940s through the 1960s.

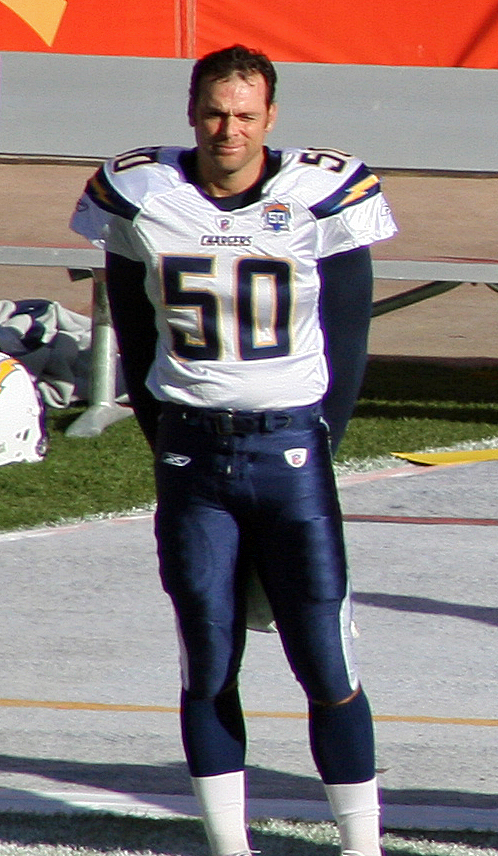
David Binn played 256 games as a long snapper.

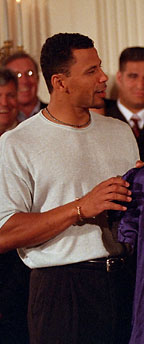
Rod Woodson leads all kick and punt returners with 238 games played. He was primarily a cornerback and also played safety.

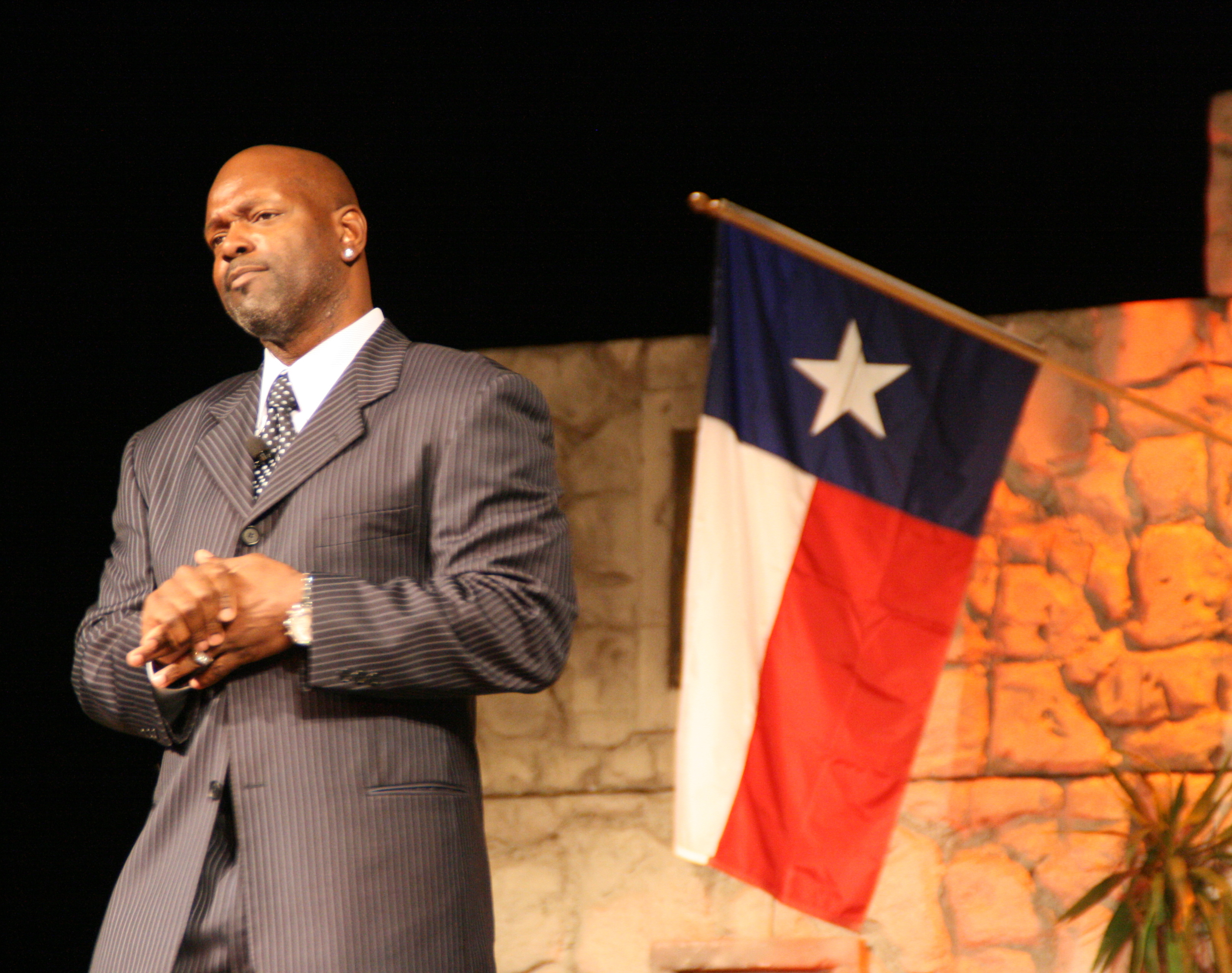
Emmitt Smith played a record 226 games at running back for the Cowboys and Cardinals before Frank Gore broke that record and retired with the current record of 241 games.

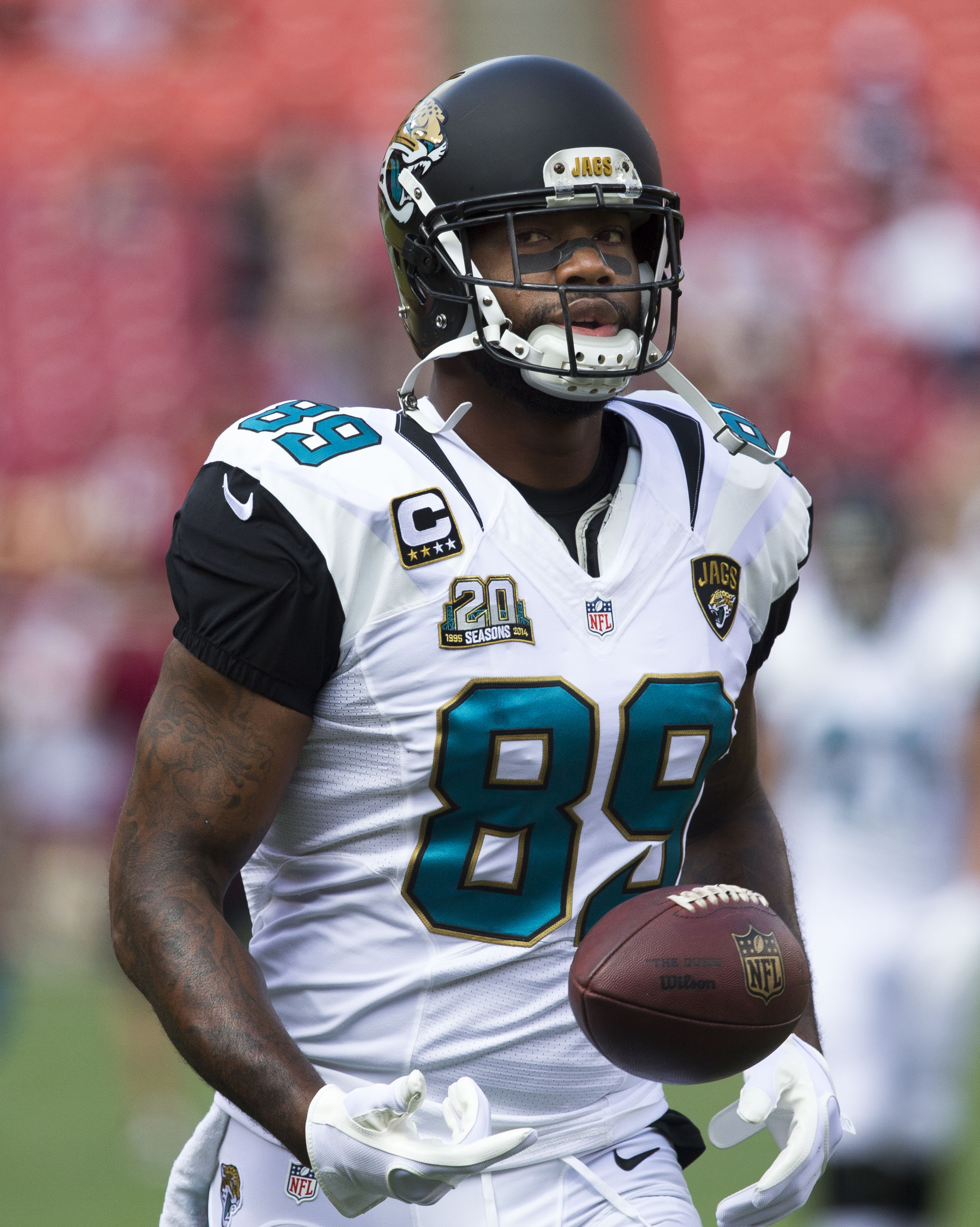
Marcedes Lewis played 290 games as a tight end, an NFL record.

Regular season games played
Rank	Name	Position	Period	Games
1	Morten Andersen*	K ^	1982–2007	382
2	Adam Vinatieri*	K	1996–2019	365
3	Gary Anderson	K	1982–2004	353
4	Jeff Feagles	P ^	1988–2009	352
5	George Blanda*	**K**, QB	1949–1975	340
6	Tom Brady	QB ^	2000–2022	335
7	Jason Hanson	K	1992–2012	327
8	Phil Dawson	K	1999–2018	305
9	Jerry Rice*	WR ^	1985–2004	303
10	John Carney	K	1988–2010	302
10	Brett Favre*	QB	1991–2010	302
12	John Kasay	K	1991–2011	301
13	Matt Stover	K	1991–2009	297
13	Andy Lee	P	2004–2022	297
15	Bruce Matthews*	OL ^	1983–2001	296
16	Darrell Green*	CB ^	1983–2002	295
17	Marcedes Lewis	TE ^	2006–2025	290
18	Drew Brees*	QB	2001–2020	287
18	**Calais Campbell**	DE ^	2008–present	287
20	Shane Lechler	P	2000–2017	286
21	**J. J. Jansen**	LS ^	2009–present	286
22	Sean Landeta	P	1985–2005	284
22	Sebastian Janikowski	K	2000–2018	284
24	Jim Marshall	DE	1960–1979	282
25	Trey Junkin	**LS**, TE, LB	1983–2002	281
26	Bruce Smith*	DE	1985–2003	279
27	Clay Matthews	LB ^	1978–1996	278
28	**Thomas Morstead**	P	2009–present	274
29	Norm Johnson	K	1982–1999	273
29	**Aaron Rodgers**	QB	2005–present	273
31	Jason Witten	TE	2003–2020	271
32	Tony Gonzalez*	TE	1997–2013	270
32	**Jon Weeks**	LS	2010–present	270
34	Matt Prater	K	2007–2025	269
35	Lou Groza*	**OT**, K	1946–1967	268
35	Junior Seau*	LB	1990–2009	268
37	**Nick Folk**	K	2007–present	267
38	Peyton Manning*	QB	1998–2015	266
38	Julius Peppers*	**DE**, LB	2002–2018	266
38	Robbie Gould	K	2005–2022	266
41	Jan Stenerud*	K	1967–1985	263
41	Lomas Brown	OT ^	1985–2002	263
41	Jason Elam	K	1993–2009	263
41	Larry Fitzgerald*	WR	2004–2020	263
45	Ray Brown	G ^	1986–2005	262
46	Mason Crosby	K	2007–2023	261
47	Nick Lowery	K	1978–1996	260
47	Don Muhlbach	LS	2004–2020	260
49	Jackie Slater*	OT	1976–1995	259
49	Lee Johnson	P	1985–2002	259
49	**Morgan Cox**	LS	2010–present	259
52	David Binn	LS	1994–2010	256
52	London Fletcher	LB	1998–2013	256
52	Sam Koch	P	2006–2022	256
55	Earl Morrall	QB	1956–1976	255
55	Irving Fryar	WR	1984–2000	255
55	Tim Brown*	WR	1988–2004	255
55	Dustin Colquitt	P	2005–2021	255
59	Charles Woodson*	S ^	1998–2015	254
60	L.P. Ladouceur	LS	2005–2020	253
61	Mike Kenn	OT	1978–1994	251
61	**Cameron Jordan**	DE	2011–present	251
63	Pat Leahy	K	1974–1991	250
63	Eddie Murray	K	1980–2000	250
63	Eugene Robinson	S	1985–2000	250
66	Ben Roethlisberger	QB	2004–2021	249
66	**Matthew Stafford**	QB	2009–present	249
68	Al Del Greco	K	1984–2000	248
68	Jason Peters	OT	2004–2023	248
70	Philip Rivers	QB	2004–2020, 2025	247
71	Fran Tarkenton*	QB	1961–1978	246
71	Jeff Van Note	C ^	1969–1986	246
71	Blair Bush	C ^	1978–1994	246
74	Mike Webster*	C	1974–1990	245
74	Patrick Mannelly	LS	1998–2013	245
76	Ray Donaldson	C	1980–1996	244
76	Ricky Proehl	WR	1990–2006	244
76	Chris Gardocki	P	1991–2006	244
76	Matt Turk	P	1995–2011	244
76	Terrell Suggs	LB	2003–2019	244
81	Bill Romanowski	LB	1988–2003	243
82	Dan Marino*	QB	1983–1999	242
83	Ed White	G	1969–1985	241
83	Craig Hentrich	P	1994–2009	241
83	Kevin Mawae*	C	1994–2009	241
83	Ronde Barber*	CB	1997–2012	241
83	Matt Bryant	K	2002–2019	241
83	Frank Gore	RB ^	2005–2020	241
89	Ron McDole	DE	1961–1978	240
89	Mick Tingelhoff*	C	1962–1978	240
89	Ryan Longwell	K	1997–2012	240
92	Charlie Joiner*	WR	1969–1986	239
92	Jerry Fontenot	C	1989–2004	239
92	Chris Mohr	P	1989–2004	239
92	Lorenzo Neal	FB ^	1993–2008	239
92	Andrew Whitworth	**OT**, G	2006–2021	239
92	Matthew Slater	WR	2008–2023	239
98	Reggie Roby	P	1983–1998	238
98	Rod Woodson*	**CB**, KR, PR, S	1987–2003	238
98	Bryan Barker	P	1990–2005	238
98	Brad Maynard	P	1997–2011	238
102	David Akers	K	1998–2013	237
102	**Cameron Heyward**	DT ^	2011–present	237
102	**Demario Davis**	LB	2012–present	237
102	**Bryan Anger**	P	2012–present	237
106	Clyde Simmons	DE	1986–2000	236
106	Ted Washington	NT ^	1991–2007	236
106	Ethan Albright	**LS**, C	1995–2010	236
106	Antonio Gates*	TE	2003–2018	236
106	Eli Manning	QB	2004–2019	236
111	Matt Bahr	K	1979–1995	235
111	Pete Metzelaars	TE	1982–1997	235
111	Olindo Mare	K	1997–2012	235
111	Mike Leach	LS	2000–2015	235
115	Jim Bakken	K	1962–1978	234
115	Stan Brock	OT	1980–1995	234
115	John Elway*	QB	1983–1998	234
115	Andre Reed*	WR	1985–2000	234
115	Cris Carter*	WR	1987–2002	234
115	Kendall Gammon	LS	1992–2006	234
115	Tony Richardson	FB	1995–2010	234
115	Lawyer Milloy	S	1996–2010	234
115	Matt Ryan	QB	2008–2022	234
124	James Lofton*	WR	1978–1993	233
124	Rohn Stark	P	1982–1997	233
124	Vinny Testaverde	QB	1987–2007	233
124	Jason Taylor*	**DE**, LB	1997–2011	233
128	Chris Doleman*	DE	1985–1999	232
128	Reggie White*	DE	1985–2000	232
128	Nick Bellore	LB	2011–2025	232
131	Frank Winters	C	1987–2002	231
131	Johnny Hekker	P	2012–2026	231
133	James Farrior	LB	1997–2011	230
133	Derrick Mason	WR	1997–2011	230
135	Steve Christie	K	1990–2004	229
135	Keith Traylor	NT	1991–2007	229
137	Jim Turner	K	1964–1979	228
137	Henry Ellard	WR	1983–1998	228
137	Jim Sweeney	C	1984–1999	228
137	Kevin Greene*	LB	1985–1999	228
137	Ray Lewis*	LB	1996–2012	228
137	Mike Adams	S	2004–2019	228
143	Rickey Jackson*	LB	1981–1995	227
143	Jim Jeffcoat	DE	1983–1997	227
143	Raleigh McKenzie	OL	1985–2000	227
143	Casey Wiegmann	C	1997–2011	227
147	Paul Krause*	S	1964–1979	226
147	Emmitt Smith*	RB	1990–2004	226
147	Donnie Jones	P	2004–2018	226
150	Carl Eller*	DE	1964–1979	225
150	Albert Lewis	CB	1983–1998	225
150	Hardy Nickerson	LB	1987–2002	225
150	Keith Brooking	LB	1998–2012	225
150	Jerry Hughes	DE	2010–2024	225
155	John Hadl	QB	1962–1977	224
155	Ed "Too Tall" Jones	DE	1974–1989	224
155	Carl Hairston	**DE**, DT	1976–1990	224
155	Art Monk*	WR	1980–1995	224
155	Mark Royals	P	1987–2003	224
155	Dan Stryzinski	P	1990–2003	224
155	Will Shields*	G	1993–2006	224
155	John Lynch*	S	1993–2007	224
155	Derrick Brooks*	LB	1995–2008	224
155	Kevin Carter	DE	1995–2008	224
155	Brian Dawkins*	S	1996–2011	224
155	John Denney	LS	2005–2018	224
167	Max Montoya	G	1979–1994	223
167	Brian Mitchell	KR^, PR	1990–2003	223
167	Isaac Bruce*	WR	1994–2009	223
167	Brett Kern	P	2008–2022	223
167	**Josh Harris**	LS	2012–present	223
172	Marcus Allen*	RB	1982–1997	222
172	Randall McDaniel*	G	1988–2001	222
174	Justin Smith	DE	2001–2014	221
174	Terence Newman	CB	2003–2017	221
176	Tom Tupa	**P**, QB	1988–2004	220
176	Dave Moore	**TE**, LS	1992–2006	220
176	Bob Whitfield	OT	1992–2006	220
176	Duane Brown	OT	2008–2023	220
180	John Randle*	DT	1990–2003	219
180	Jeff Zgonina	DT	1993–2009	219
180	Wayne Gandy	OT	1994–2008	219
180	Terrell Owens*	WR	1996–2010	219
180	Takeo Spikes	LB	1998–2012	219
180	Dominic Raiola	C	2001–2014	219
180	Steve Smith, Sr.	WR	2001–2016	219
180	Stephen Gostkowski	K	2006–2020	219
180	Bobby Wagner	LB	2012–2025	219
189	Sonny Jurgensen*	QB	1957–1974	218
189	Alan Page*	DT	1967–1981	218
189	Jim Ritcher	OL	1980–1995	218
189	Joe Nash	**NT**, DT	1982–1996	218
189	Dan Turk	LS	1985–1999	218
189	Randy Moss*	WR	1998–2012	218
189	Dwight Freeney*	DE	2002–2017	218
189	**Kevin Zeitler**	G	2012–present	218
197	Jerrel Wilson	P	1963–1978	217
197	Gene Upshaw*	G	1967–1981	217
197	Guy Morriss	OL	1973–1987	217
197	Bill Bates	S	1983–1997	217
197	Eric Allen*	CB	1988–2001	217
197	Hines Ward	WR	1998–2011	217
203	Dave Butz	DT	1973–1988	216
203	Dave Brown	CB	1975–1989	216
203	Darryl Talley	LB	1983–1996	216
203	Dwight Stone	**KR**, WR	1987–2000	216
203	Michael Strahan*	DE	1993–2007	216
203	Kevin Huber	P	2009–2022	216
203	Ryan Succop	K	2009–2022	216
203	**Harrison Smith**	S	2012–present	216
211	Ted Hendricks*	LB	1969–1983	215
211	Monte Coleman	LB	1979–1994	215
211	John Kidd	P	1984–1998	215
211	Champ Bailey*	CB	1999–2013	215
211	Lavonte David	LB	2012–2025	215
211	Brandon Graham	DE	2010–2025	215
211	**Sam Martin**	P	2013–present	
218	Ray Crockett	CB	1989–2002	214
218	Vonnie Holliday	DE	1998–2012	214
218	Domata Peko	NT	2006–2019	214
218	**Kyle Juszczyk**	FB	2013–present	214
222	Jimmy Johnson*	CB	1961–1976	213
222	Pat Fischer	CB	1961–1977	213
222	Mark Moseley	K	1970–1986	213
222	Steve McMichael*	DT	1980–1994	213
222	Dave Krieg	QB	1980–1998	213
222	Kevin Gogan	G	1987–2000	213
222	Henry Thomas	DT	1987–2000	213
222	Todd Steussie	OL	1994–2007	213
222	Aaron Brewer	LS	2012–2025	213
222	**Trent Williams**	OT	2010–present	213
222	**Von Miller**	LB	2011–present	213
233	Jeff Gossett	P	1981–1996	212
233	Rodney Holman	TE	1982–1995	212
233	Brian Hansen	P	1984–1999	212
233	Bruce Armstrong	OT	1987–2000	212
233	Roman Phifer	LB	1991–2005	212
233	Willie McGinest	LB	1994–2008	212
233	Rian Lindell	K	2000–2013	212
233	Karlos Dansby	LB	2004–2017	212
233	Justin Tucker	K	2012–2024	212
233	**Joe Flacco**	QB	2008–present	212
243	Johnny Unitas*	QB	1956–1973	211
243	Len Dawson*	QB	1957–1975	211
243	Drew Hill	WR	1979–1993	211
243	Earnest Byner	RB	1984–1997	211
243	Ed West	TE	1984–1997	211
243	Jeff Dellenbach	C	1985–1999	211
243	Trace Armstrong	DE	1989–2003	211
243	Aeneas Williams*	**CB**, S	1991–2004	211
243	Jeff Saturday	C	1999–2012	211
243	Jay Feely	K	2001–2014	211
243	Reggie Wayne	WR	2001–2014	211
243	Johnathan Joseph	CB	2006–2020	211
Rank	Name	Position	Period	Games

== See also ==
- List of most consecutive starts and games played by National Football League players
