= Kevin Matthews (American football) =

American football player (born 1987)

No. 60, 61
- Position: Center

Personal information
- Born: February 4, 1987 (age 39); Sugar Land, Texas, U.S.
- Listed height: 6 ft 3 in (1.91 m)
- Listed weight: 300 lb (136 kg)

Career information
- High school: Elkins (Missouri City, Texas)
- College: Texas A&M
- NFL draft: 2010: undrafted

Career history
- Tennessee Titans (2010–2012); Washington Redskins (2013)*; Tennessee Titans (2013); Carolina Panthers (2014)
- * Offseason or practice squad member only

Career NFL statistics
- Games played: 17
- Games started: 3
- Stats at Pro Football Reference

Kevin James Matthews (born February 4, 1987) is an American former professional football player who was a center for five seasons in the National Football League (NFL). He played college football for the Texas A&M Aggies and was signed as a undrafted free agent by the Tennessee Titans.

== Early life ==
Matthews attended Elkins High School, where he received All-District honors in his last two years. He was named to the 2005 All-Greater Houston football team. He also practiced the shot put.

He accepted a scholarship from Texas A&M University, becoming a starter at center as a junior. He finished his college career with 34 games and 25 straight starts.

== Professional career ==
Pre-draft measurables
| Height | Weight | 40-yard dash | 10-yard split | 20-yard split | 20-yard shuttle | Three-cone drill | Vertical jump | Broad jump | Bench press |
|---|---|---|---|---|---|---|---|---|---|
| 6 ft 3 1/2 in (1.92 m) | 298 lb (135 kg) | 5.32 s | 1.83 s | 3.04 s | 4.82 s | 7.65 s | 29.0 in (0.74 m) | 8 ft 3 in (2.51 m) | 28 reps |
All values from Pro Day

=== Tennessee Titans (first stint) ===
Matthews was signed by the Tennessee Titans as an undrafted free agent following the 2010 NFL draft on April 30. He was waived during final cuts on September 4, but was re-signed to the team's practice squad the next day. He was promoted to the active roster on December 15, after center Eugene Amano was placed on the injured reserve list due to a neck injury and started the last game of the season against the Indianapolis Colts. The next year, 2011, he was declared inactive for 15 games.

In 2012, he appeared in 14 games (2 starts), before being lost for the year with a high ankle sprain injury, suffered in the week 15 game against the New York Jets.

=== Washington Redskins ===
On May 7, 2013, Matthews signed as a free agent with the Washington Redskins. He did not make the final roster and was cut on the last day of training camp on August 30.

=== Tennessee Titans (second stint) ===
On November 12, 2013, Matthews was re-signed by the Titans. Throughout November and December, he was waived and re-signed on two occasions.

=== Carolina Panthers ===
On July 23, 2014, he was signed by the Carolina Panthers. On August 26, he was placed on the injured reserve list with a right shoulder injury, that he suffered during a preseason practice.

== Personal life ==
Matthews' father, Bruce Matthews, is a Hall of Fame offensive lineman who played for the Houston / Tennessee Oilers / Titans from 1983 to 2001. His uncle, Clay Matthews Jr., is a former four-time Pro Bowl linebacker who played for the Cleveland Browns and Atlanta Falcons from 1978 to 1996. His grandfather, Clay Matthews Sr., is a former offensive tackle and linebacker who played for the San Francisco 49ers for four seasons during the 1950s. His younger brother, Jake Matthews, is an offensive tackle for the Atlanta Falcons. He also has two other younger brothers who did not play in the NFL: Mike, who played as a center and was signed as an undrafted free agent by the Cleveland Browns, and Luke, who played on the offensive line for the Texas A&M Aggies. Matthews' cousins, Clay Matthews III was a linebacker for the Green Bay Packers and Los Angeles Rams, and Casey Matthews was a linebacker for the Philadelphia Eagles.
