= Bruce Matthews =

American football player and coach (born 1961)

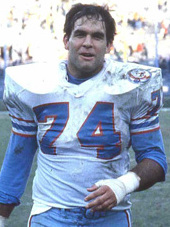
- Matthews with the Houston Oilers in 1984

No. 74
- Positions: Offensive tackle, guard, center, long snapper

Personal information
- Born: August 8, 1961 (age 65); Raleigh, North Carolina, U.S.
- Listed height: 6 ft 5 in (1.96 m)
- Listed weight: 305 lb (138 kg)

Career information
- High school: Arcadia (Arcadia, California)
- College: USC (1979–1982)
- NFL draft: 1983: 1st round, 9th overall pick

Career history

Playing
- Houston / Tennessee Oilers / Titans (1983–2001)

Coaching
- Houston Texans (2009–2010) Offensive assistant; Tennessee Titans (2011–2013) Offensive line coach

Awards and highlights
- 7× First-team All-Pro (1988–1990, 1992, 1998–2000); 3× Second-team All-Pro (1991, 1993, 1996); 14× Pro Bowl (1988–2001); NFL 1990s All-Decade Team; NFL 100th Anniversary All-Time Team; PFWA All-Rookie Team (1983); Titans/Oilers Ring of Honor; Tennessee Titans No. 74 retired; Morris Trophy (1982); Consensus All-American (1982); 2× First-team All-Pacific-10 (1981, 1982); Texas Sports Hall of Fame; NFL record: Most career starts with one team: 293 (Houston / Tennessee Oilers / Titans)

Career NFL statistics
- Games played: 296
- Games started: 293
- Forced fumbles: 5
- Fumble recoveries: 10
- Stats at Pro Football Reference
- Pro Football Hall of Fame

Bruce Rankin Matthews (born August 8, 1961) is an American former professional football guard, center, offensive tackle, and long snapper who played 19 seasons in the National Football League (NFL). He spent his entire career playing for the Houston / Tennessee Oilers / Titans. Highly versatile, Matthews played every position on the offensive line throughout his NFL career, starting in 99 games as a left guard, 87 as a center, 67 as a right guard, 22 as a right tackle, 17 as a left tackle, and was the long snapper on field goals, extra points, and punts. Having never missed a game due to injury, Matthews' 293 NFL games started is the third most of all time, behind quarterbacks Brett Favre and Tom Brady.

Matthews played college football for the USC Trojans, where he was recognized as a consensus All-American as a senior. Matthews was selected in the first round (ninth overall) of the 1983 NFL draft by the Houston Oilers and was a 14-time Pro Bowl selection, tied for the second-most in NFL history, in addition to a nine-time first-team All-Pro. Matthews was inducted into the Pro Football Hall of Fame in 2007, and his number 74 jersey is retired by the Titans.

After retiring as a player, Matthews served as an assistant coach for the Houston Texans and Titans. A member of the Matthews family of football players, he is the brother of linebacker Clay Matthews Jr.; father of center Kevin Matthews and tackle Jake Matthews; and uncle of linebacker Clay Matthews III and linebacker Casey Matthews.

== Early life ==
Bruce Rankin Matthews was born on August 8, 1961, in Raleigh, North Carolina, to Clay Matthews Sr. and Daisy Matthews. Clay Sr. was a defensive lineman for the San Francisco 49ers in the 1950s. The Matthews family moved from a Chicago suburb to Arcadia, California, when Bruce was entering the 10th grade. He played football at Arcadia High School and was an immediate football standout on the offensive and defensive line, along with doing well in high school wrestling. As a junior in 1977, Matthews was named to the All-California Interscholastic Federation third-team. As a senior, he played in the Shrine All-Star Football Classic alongside John Elway. Arcadia High later retired Matthews' No. 72 jersey.

== College career ==
Matthews attended the University of Southern California, where he played all offensive line positions at various times for the USC Trojans football team. As a senior in 1982, Matthews was shifted from weakside to strongside guard to replace departing Roy Foster as the principal blocker in the "Student Body Right" play. Matthews was named to the first-team All-Pacific-10 Conference team after his junior and senior seasons. As a senior, Matthews earned consensus All-America honors and won the Morris Trophy, which is awarded to the best lineman in the conference.

== Professional career ==
Matthews is considered to be one of the most versatile offensive linemen to play in the NFL. He started in 99 games as a left guard, 67 as a right guard, 87 as a center, 22 as a right tackle, 17 as a left tackle, and was the long snapper on field goals, extra points, and punts. Matthews was selected to 14 Pro Bowls, which tied a league record set by Merlin Olsen at the time. Matthews was also named a first-team All-Pro nine times and an All-American Football Conference selection 12 times. An extremely durable player, he retired after the 2001 season having played more games (296) than any NFL player, excluding kickers and punters, (Note: Since surpassed by Brett Favre; Matthews still holds the record for linemen.) and played in more seasons (19) than any offensive lineman. Matthews never missed a game due to injury, and started 229 consecutive games. He is the only player who played against the Baltimore Colts in their last game at Memorial Stadium in 1983 and against the Baltimore Ravens in their last game at Memorial Stadium in 1997.

=== 1983–86: Guard, center, and tackle ===
The Houston Oilers drafted Matthews with the ninth overall pick in the first round of the 1983 NFL draft. During his first two seasons, Matthews blocked for future Hall of Fame running back Earl Campbell. As a rookie, Matthews played guard and was named to the PFWA NFL All-Rookie Team. Before his second season, Matthews was moved from right guard to center, snapping to quarterback Warren Moon. However, Matthews played multiple positions that season due to injuries on the offensive line; at one point he played center, guard, and tackle in successive weeks. In 1985 and 1986, Matthews alternated between right and left tackle.

=== 1987–90: Right guard ===
Matthews missed the first eight games of the 1987 season, as held out due to a contract dispute. Upon his return, Matthews was moved back to right guard. He remained at the right guard position in 1988, 1989, and 1990, being named to the Pro Bowl each season. Matthews also earned first-team All-Pro recognition each year from the Associated Press (AP), Pro Football Weekly, and The Sporting News. He thrived in the run and shoot offensive scheme adopted by the Oilers around this time, which required linemen to be exceptionally agile. The holes Matthews opened up helped running back Mike Rozier to consecutive Pro Bowls in 1987 and 1988.

=== 1991–94: Center ===
The Oilers placed Matthews at center for the final game of the 1990 season in an effort to bolster the team's running game. Of the move, Matthews said, "I'd like to stay at guard, but forces greater than myself make these adjustments." Behind blocking by Matthews and fellow future Hall of Fame guard Mike Munchak, Oilers quarterback Warren Moon led the league in passing yards in 1990 and 1991 while running back Lorenzo White was a 1992 Pro Bowl selection. Matthews remained the team's center through the 1994 season, being named to the Pro Bowl each year.

=== 1995–2001: Left guard ===
Prior to the 1995 season, Matthews signed a four-year, $10.3 million contract extension with the Oilers. That same year, the Oilers signed free agent center Mark Stepnoski, and Matthews moved to left guard as a result. He spent the majority of the rest of his career at the position, occasionally filling in for injured players along the offensive line. During this time, the Oilers left Houston for Tennessee after the 1996 season. Matthews' blocking helped running back Eddie George to four straight Pro Bowl seasons.

In 1999, at age 37, Matthews signed another four-year contract to remain with the Oilers. That season, the Oilers rebranded as the Tennessee Titans. The team won 13 games, plus three more in the playoffs before losing to the St. Louis Rams in Super Bowl XXXIV. Following the 2000 season, he received the Bart Starr Award.

=== Retirement ===
Matthews retired from football in July 2002 at age 40.

== Coaching ==
=== Houston Texans ===
On February 27, 2009, Matthews returned to Houston where he was signed on as an offensive assistant with the Houston Texans after volunteer coaching at his children's high school, Elkins High School.

=== Tennessee Titans ===
On February 9, 2011, Matthews was hired as offensive line coach by new Tennessee Titans head coach Mike Munchak. Both were Hall of Fame linemen for the Houston Oilers. Regarding his new job, Matthews stated, "For me this is an opportunity of a lifetime. It is such a unique opportunity to work with Mike because I think he will do a great job. It is just one of those things I couldn't pass up."

After the Titans finished the 2013 season with a 7–9 record, general manager Ruston Webster and president/CEO Tommy Smith met with Munchak and gave him the option to fire a large contingent of assistant coaches, which included Matthews, in exchange for an extension and a raise, or lose his job as head coach. Munchak was not willing to fire everyone they were ordering him to fire, so Munchak parted ways with the Titans, along with Matthews and the other assistant coaches they wanted him to fire.

== Honors and legacy ==
In his first year of eligibility, Matthews was elected to the Pro Football Hall of Fame as part of the class of 2007. He was inducted during the Enshrinement Ceremony on August 4, 2007, with the unveiling of his bust, sculpted by Scott Myers. Matthews was the first player from the Titans to be given this honor since the relocation from Houston. He was the fifth player from the 1983 NFL draft class to be enshrined, joining Dan Marino, Eric Dickerson, John Elway, and Jim Kelly; Darrell Green, Richard Dent, Jim Covert, and Roger Craig became the sixth, seventh, eighth, and ninth members. Matthews was selected as a guard on the NFL's All-Decade Team of the 1990s. In 2010, he was ranked 78th on The Top 100: NFL's Greatest Players by the NFL Network. At Super Bowl LV, Matthews was named to the NFL 100 All-Time Team as one of the top 100 players of the first 100 years of the NFL.

== Personal life ==
Matthews comes from a football family. A devout Christian as evidenced in his Hall of Fame Speech, Matthews is the son of Clay Matthews Sr., who played in the NFL in the 1950s. His brother, Clay Jr., also played 19 seasons in the NFL. Matthews is the uncle of linebacker Clay Matthews III, former NFL linebacker Casey Matthews, and Kyle Matthews of the USC Trojans.

Matthews and his wife, Carrie, have seven children: Steven, Kevin, Marilyn, Jake, Mike, Luke, and Gwen. Kevin played center for the Texas A&M Aggies until the 2009 football season and then played in the NFL for five years as a member of the Titans and Carolina Panthers. Jake played offensive tackle for Texas A&M and is currently the starting left tackle for the Atlanta Falcons. Mike played on the offensive line for Texas A&M, where he was the starting center. Matthews' youngest son, Luke, played on the offensive line for Texas A&M, but had to medically retire due to injuries and now works in real estate. Matthews is also the uncle of tight end Troy Niklas by way of Carrie's sister.

== See also ==
- List of NFL players by games played
- List of most consecutive starts and games played by National Football League players
