= H. L. Matthews =

Boxing, baseball, and track coach

H. L. "Matty" Matthews
Biographical details
- Born: February 14, 1889; Jeffersonville, Ohio, U.S.
- Died: February 27, 1975 (aged 86); Charleston, South Carolina, U.S.

Coaching career (HC unless noted)
- 1926–1953: The Citadel (boxing)
- 1926–1930; 1937–1938: The Citadel (baseball)
- 1926–1930; 1941: The Citadel (track and field)

Howard Lynn Matthews (February 14, 1889 – February 27, 1975), usually known as Matty Matthews or H. L. Matthews, was a minor league baseball player and coach of several sports at The Citadel, The Military College of South Carolina. His son Clay became head of a long family line of standout National Football League (NFL) players.

== Early life ==
Matthews was born in Jeffersonville, Ohio on February 14, 1889. He played baseball for several minor league teams from 1912 through 1915, primarily in the South Atlantic League. With the onset of World War I, he enlisted in the United States Army, where he began boxing. After the war, he returned to baseball for the 1922 season and briefly pursued a career as a stock market telegrapher. In 1925, Matthews began coaching athletics at The Citadel.

== Coaching career ==
Matthews rotated as coach of baseball, track and field, and boxing at The Citadel from 1926 to 1941. Matthews was part of the inaugural class of inductees into The Citadel Athletic Hall of Fame in 1977. He was also inducted in the Carolinas Boxing Hall of Fame in 2005.

== Head coaching record ==
=== Baseball ===
Matthews's record as head coach of The Citadel baseball team is incomplete. Only two seasons have complete records, one each during his two stints as coach of the baseball team.

Record table
Season	Team	Overall	Postseason
The Citadel (1926–1930)
1928	The Citadel	1–12	
The Citadel:		1–12	
The Citadel (1937–1938)
1938	The Citadel	6–6	
The Citadel:		6–6	
Total:			
National champion Postseason invitational champion Conference regular season champion Conference regular season and conference tournament champion Division regular season champion Division regular season and conference tournament champion Conference tournament champion

=== Track and field ===
No records are available for Matthews' tenure as track and field coach at The Citadel.
