= Casey Matthews =

American football player (born 1989)

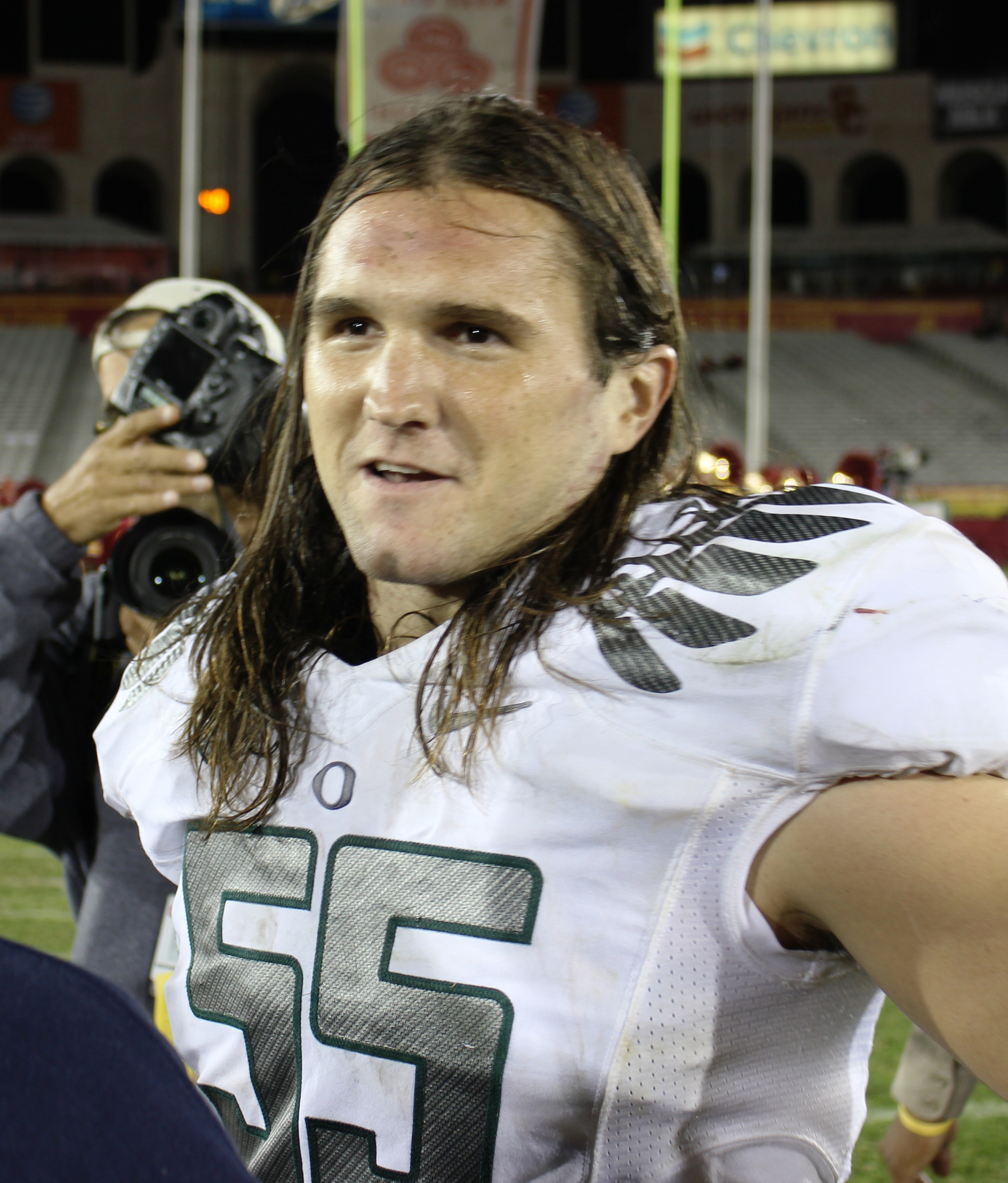
- Matthews with the Oregon Ducks in 2010

No. 50
- Position: Linebacker

Personal information
- Born: January 16, 1989 (age 37); Northridge, California, U.S.
- Listed height: 6 ft 1 in (1.85 m)
- Listed weight: 242 lb (110 kg)

Career information
- High school: Oaks Christian School (Westlake Village, California)
- College: Oregon (2007–2010)
- NFL draft: 2011: 4th round, 116th overall pick

Career history
- Philadelphia Eagles (2011–2014); Minnesota Vikings (2015)

Awards and highlights
- Second-team All-American (2010); First-team All-Pac-10 (2010); Second-team All-Pac-10 (2009)

Career NFL statistics
- Total tackles: 114
- Sacks: 2.5
- Forced fumbles: 1
- Fumble recoveries: 2
- Stats at Pro Football Reference

Casey Christopher Matthews (born January 16, 1989) is an American former professional football player who was a linebacker for four seasons in the National Football League (NFL). He played college football for the Oregon Ducks and was selected by the Philadelphia Eagles in the fourth round of the 2011 NFL draft. He is the brother of Clay Matthews III.

== Early life ==
Matthews attended Oaks Christian School in Westlake Village, California, where he played for the Oaks Christian Lions high school football team. During his junior year, he recorded 132 tackles and four quarterback sacks. As a senior, he recorded 158 tackles, ten sacks, and two interceptions. The Oaks Christian Lions posted a 15–0 record as the California Interscholastic Federation (CIF) Division III state champions and finished as the sixth-ranked team in the USA Today national rankings. As both a junior and senior, Matthews was named an all-Tri Valley League player, defensive player of the year, and all-county player.

Considered a three-star recruit by Rivals.com, Matthews was listed as the No. 17 inside linebacker in the nation in 2007. He chose Oregon over offers from Arizona State, California, Colorado, Georgia Tech and Ole Miss.

== College career ==
Matthews attended the University of Oregon, where he studied economics. As a true freshman in 2007, Matthews saw action in the first 11 games including one start against the Arizona Wildcats. He recorded 18 tackles including 11 solo. After suffering a shoulder injury late in the season, he did not play in the game against the Oregon State Beavers or in the 2007 Sun Bowl.

In 2008, he played in all 13 games and recorded 67 tackles, including 13 tackles for loss and two sacks. Matthews compiled a career-high of nine tackles three times, against the California Golden Bears, the Stanford Cardinal, and the Oklahoma State Cowboys. He finished as the team's sixth-leading tackler and third in terms of tackles for loss, with 13.0 for 44 yards. College Football News included him among their "120 Players To Know" and wrote that he is "fundamentally sound, he diagnoses plays well and has a knack for filling the proper lane, a couple of keys to being a successful inside linebacker." Matthews participated in the 2011 BCS National Championship Game, where Oregon lost to the Auburn Tigers, 22–19. Matthews recorded a forced fumble against Heisman Trophy winner, Cam Newton, which led to a game-tying score late in the fourth quarter.

Matthews finished his college career at the University of Oregon with 50 games played, 245 tackles, nine sacks and four interceptions.

== Professional career ==
=== Pre-draft ===
Matthews was projected to be drafted in the fourth round of the 2011 NFL draft.

Pre-draft measurables
| Height | Weight | Arm length | Hand span | Wingspan | 40-yard dash | 10-yard split | 20-yard split | 20-yard shuttle | Three-cone drill | Vertical jump | Broad jump | Bench press |
|---|---|---|---|---|---|---|---|---|---|---|---|---|
| 6 ft 0 7/8 in (1.85 m) | 231 lb (105 kg) | 31 1/2 in (0.80 m) | 8 1/2 in (0.22 m) | 6 ft 3 1/4 in (1.91 m) | 4.78 s | 1.67 s | 2.71 s | 4.36 s | 7.10 s | 32.5 in (0.83 m) | 9 ft 5 in (2.87 m) | 13 reps |
All values from NFL Combine/Pro Day

=== Philadelphia Eagles ===
Matthews was selected by the Philadelphia Eagles in the fourth round (116th overall) of the 2011 NFL draft. He was signed to a four-year contract on July 27, 2011. He opened the 2011 NFL season as the Eagles' starting middle linebacker, playing in all 16 games. When the Eagles added DeMeco Ryans in 2012, Matthews moved to special teams coverage. With the Eagles moving to a 3-4 defense under new coach Chip Kelly and new defensive coordinator Billy Davis, Matthews saw increased playing time on defense. In 2014, he played in all 16 games and started 11, having the best statistical season of his career.

=== Minnesota Vikings ===
Matthews was signed by the Minnesota Vikings as a free agent on March 24, 2015. He sustained a hip labrum injury that required surgery and was placed on injured reserve, ending his season without playing in a game for the Vikings.

== NFL career statistics ==
Legend
| **Bold** | Career high |

=== Regular season ===
| Year | Team | Games | | Tackles | | | | | Interceptions | | | | | Fumbles | | | |
| Year | Team | GP | GS | Cmb | Solo | Ast | Sck | TFL | Int | Yds | TD | Lng | PD | FF | FR | Yds | TD |
|---|---|---|---|---|---|---|---|---|---|---|---|---|---|---|---|---|---|
| 2011 | PHI | **16** | 3 | 38 | 30 | 8 | 1.0 | 3 | 0 | 0 | 0 | 0 | 0 | 0 | 0 | 0 | 0 |
| 2012 | PHI | **16** | 1 | 11 | 10 | 1 | 0.0 | 0 | 0 | 0 | 0 | 0 | 0 | 0 | 0 | 0 | 0 |
| 2013 | PHI | **16** | 0 | 12 | 10 | 2 | 0.0 | 0 | 0 | 0 | 0 | 0 | 0 | 0 | **1** | 0 | 0 |
| 2014 | PHI | **16** | **11** | **53** | **31** | **22** | **1.5** | **4** | 0 | 0 | 0 | 0 | 0 | **1** | **1** | **8** | 0 |
| | | 64 | 15 | 114 | 81 | 33 | 2.5 | 7 | 0 | 0 | 0 | 0 | 0 | 1 | 2 | 8 | 0 |

=== Playoffs ===
| Year | Team | Games | | Tackles | | | | | Interceptions | | | | | Fumbles | | | |
| Year | Team | GP | GS | Cmb | Solo | Ast | Sck | TFL | Int | Yds | TD | Lng | PD | FF | FR | Yds | TD |
|---|---|---|---|---|---|---|---|---|---|---|---|---|---|---|---|---|---|
| 2013 | PHI | **1** | 0 | **1** | **1** | 0 | 0.0 | 0 | 0 | 0 | 0 | 0 | 0 | 0 | 0 | 0 | 0 |
| | | 1 | 0 | 1 | 1 | 0 | 0.0 | 0 | 0 | 0 | 0 | 0 | 0 | 0 | 0 | 0 | 0 |

== Personal life ==
Matthews was born in Northridge, California to parents Clay and Leslie Matthews. His father Clay Matthews Jr. played football as an All-American at USC and had a 19-year professional football career in the National Football League. His grandfather Clay Matthews Sr. and uncle Bruce Matthews both played in the NFL, as well as his brother Clay Matthews III. He also has cousins involved in football: Kevin Matthews was a center for the Tennessee Titans, Jake Matthews is an offensive tackle for the Atlanta Falcons, Mike Matthews was a center for three NFL teams in the offseason, and Luke Matthews was an offensive lineman at Texas A&M.

Matthews married his high school sweetheart Alyssa Grillo on July 14, 2012. They have two children.
