= Clay Matthews III =

American football player (born 1986)

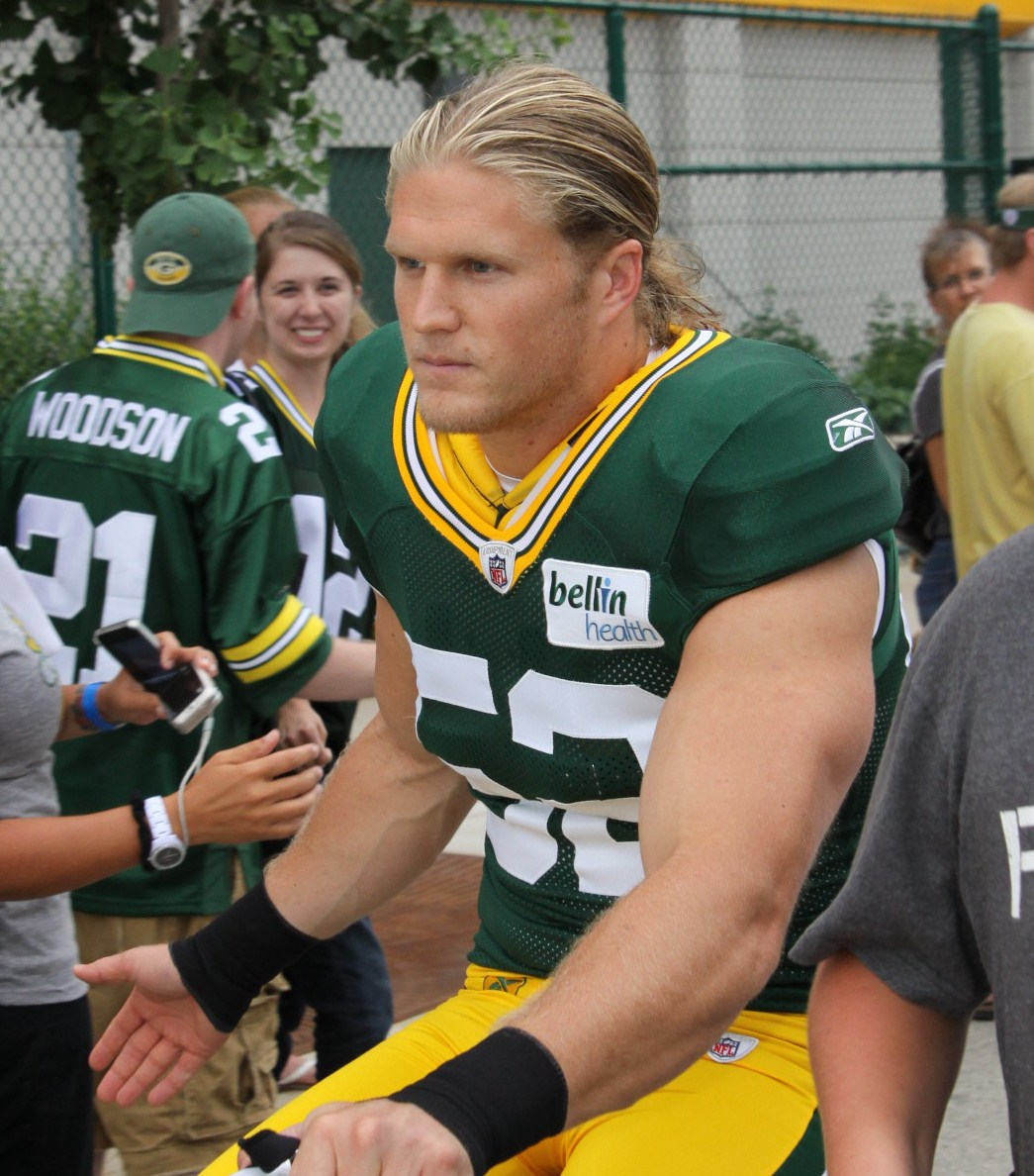
- Matthews with the Green Bay Packers in 2011

No. 52
- Position: Linebacker

Personal information
- Born: May 14, 1986 (age 40); Los Angeles, California, U.S.
- Listed height: 6 ft 3 in (1.91 m)
- Listed weight: 255 lb (116 kg)

Career information
- High school: Agoura (Agoura Hills, California)
- College: USC (2004–2008)
- NFL draft: 2009: 1st round, 26th overall pick

Career history
- Green Bay Packers (2009–2018); Los Angeles Rams (2019)

Awards and highlights
- Super Bowl champion (XLV); First-team All-Pro (2010); Second-team All-Pro (2012); 6× Pro Bowl (2009–2012, 2014–2015); Butkus Award (pro) (2010); Green Bay Packers Hall of Fame; Second-team All-Pac-10 (2008); 3× Rose Bowl champion (2007–2009)

Career NFL statistics
- Total tackles: 519
- Sacks: 91.5
- Pass deflections: 44
- Interceptions: 6
- Forced fumbles: 17
- Defensive touchdowns: 3
- Stats at Pro Football Reference

William Clay Matthews III (born May 14, 1986) is an American former professional football linebacker who played in the National Football League for 11 seasons (NFL), primarily with the Green Bay Packers. Matthews is the all-time sack leader for the Packers (with 83.5), as well as a six-time Pro Bowl selection and two-time All-Pro. He was inducted into the team's Hall of Fame in 2024.

After attending Agoura High School in Agoura Hills, California, Matthews was a walk-on student athlete at the University of Southern California for the USC Trojans football team under head coach Pete Carroll. At USC, Matthews was a standout special teams player, winning three consecutive Special Teams Player of the Year awards from 2006 to 2008. He also played reserve outside linebacker during those years before moving into a starting role his senior season. During his college career, Matthews was a part of three Pac-10 Championship teams.

Matthews was considered a top prospect for the 2009 NFL draft. He was ultimately selected by the Green Bay Packers in the first round of the draft (26th overall) after the team traded up to make the selection. As a rookie, Matthews recorded 10 sacks while playing outside linebacker. He topped that total in 2010 with 13.5 sacks, helping the Packers to their Super Bowl XLV victory. Matthews continued his role as a leading pass rusher, recording at least six sacks in the first nine seasons he played. Matthews also showed his athleticism and abilities by playing both inside and outside linebacker during the 2014 and 2015 seasons.

A member of the Matthews family of football players, he is the brother of former NFL linebacker Casey Matthews, the son of former NFL linebacker Clay Matthews Jr., and the nephew of Pro Football Hall of Fame offensive lineman Bruce Matthews.

== Early life ==
Matthews was born in the Northridge section of Los Angeles, the son of Leslie and Clay Matthews Jr., a professional football player. The family has a history of professional football players. Matthews' grandfather was Clay Matthews Sr., his brother is linebacker Casey Matthews, and his uncle is Bruce Matthews. Matthews also has cousins involved in football: Kevin Matthews, Jake Matthews, and Mike Matthews. His two older brothers, Kyle and Brian, both members of National Championship teams during their time with USC Trojans football, work in the commercial real estate business in Tennessee and online sports gambling business in Ohio, respectively. His younger brother, Casey, played college football with Oregon Ducks football, making an appearance in a national championship game in the 2011 BCS National Championship Game. Casey played professionally for several seasons. His sister, Jennifer, is often featured on NFL Network where she discusses fantasy football.

Matthews attended Agoura High School in Agoura Hills, California, where he played for the Chargers. Physically, Matthews was a late bloomer. His father was the team's defensive coordinator, but declined to start his son because he was physically undersized. Matthews began developing physically in his senior season, but only garnered interest from Division I FCS schools and local community colleges. Matthews has described his own recruiting status out of high school as "not applicable". Like his father and uncle, Matthews opted to attend the University of Southern California with hopes of becoming a walk-on for the Trojans football team.

== College career ==
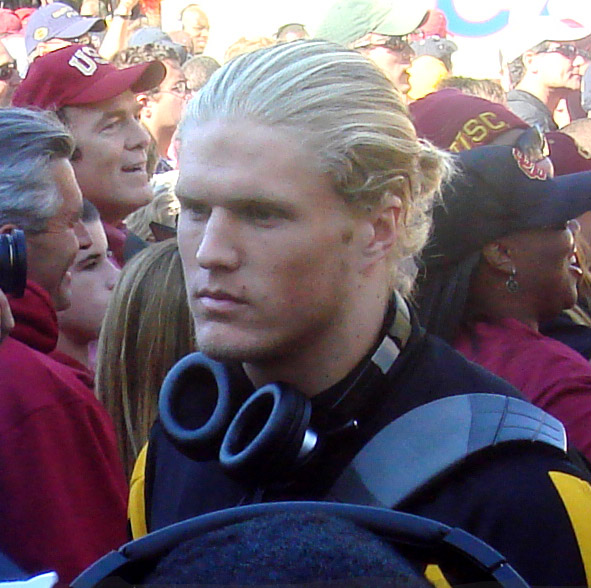
Matthews in 2007

Matthews attended the University of Southern California and played for the Trojans from 2004 to 2008 under head coach Pete Carroll. Though he was the son of an All-Pro NFL linebacker, Matthews entered USC as an unheralded, walk-on student athlete. During his first season, USC's 2004 BCS National Championship, Matthews played only on the scout team and turned down several playing opportunities during garbage time during the fourth quarters of games to preserve his redshirt status and remaining seasons of NCAA eligibility. Matthews remained a nonathletic scholarship (a "walk on") reserve linebacker during the 2005 season and played mainly on special teams. He was granted full athletic scholarship status at the beginning of the 2006 season. Matthews continued to play reserve linebacker in the 2006 and 2007 seasons, and made two starts in 2007 in place of injured teammate Brian Cushing. He was awarded USC's Co-Special Teams Player of the Year in 2006 and 2007 and blocked two field goals in the later season.

During the offseason, Matthews committed to weight training and conditioning programs to gain size and improve his performance level and stamina. At the beginning of the 2008 season, defensive coordinator Nick Holt, Carroll, and Norton decided to try using Matthews in a hybrid "elephant" position, where Matthews would stand in the position of defensive end, but use the speed and tactics of a linebacker; the coaches had used Cushing in the position in a similar manner in 2006. The experiment was successful, as Matthews recorded 4.5 sacks while playing alongside his other NFL-bound teammates Brian Cushing, Rey Maualuga, and Kaluka Maiava. Furthermore, Matthews continued his spectacular special teams play and was awarded USC's Co-Special Teams Player of the Year in 2008, making Matthews the only player in USC history to be awarded three consecutive Special Teams Player of the Year awards. He was a participant in the 2009 Senior Bowl and was considered a top prospect for the 2009 NFL draft.

Matthews was one of 12 senior USC football players, including the four linebackers Cushing, Maiava, Matthews, and Maualuga, invited to the 2009 NFL Scouting Combine. Matthews, Maualuga, and Cushing were featured on the cover of Sports Illustrated's 2009 NFL Draft Preview magazine, as all three were regarded by it as potential first-round selections. He was inducted into the Senior Bowl Hall of Fame on June 25, 2023.

== Professional career ==
Pre-draft measurables
Height	Weight	Arm length	Hand span	40-yard dash	10-yard split	20-yard split	20-yard shuttle	Three-cone drill	Vertical jump	Broad jump	Bench press	Wonderlic
6 ft 3 1/8 in (1.91 m)	240 lb (109 kg)	32 1/4 in (0.82 m)	9 1/2 in (0.24 m)	4.67 s	1.61 s	2.71 s	4.18 s	6.90 s	35.5 in (0.90 m)	10 ft 1 in (3.07 m)	23 reps	27
All values from NFL Combine

=== Green Bay Packers ===
==== 2009 ====
On August 7, 2008, the Green Bay Packers traded Brett Favre to the New York Jets for what would become the Jets' third-round draft pick (83rd overall) in the 2009 NFL draft.

On draft day, April 25, 2009, the Packers traded their second-round pick (41st overall, Darius Butler), their third-round pick (73rd overall, Derek Cox, Jacksonville Jaguars), and the 83rd overall pick acquired for Favre (Brandon Tate) to the New England Patriots for a first-round pick (26th overall) and a fifth-round pick (162nd overall, Jamon Meredith) in that year's draft. The Packers used the first-round pick obtained from the Patriots to acquire Matthews.

Kevin Greene, the former All-Pro linebacker who is third on the all-time sack list with 160 (most ever by a linebacker), was hired by Dom Capers in 2009 to coach the outside linebacker position. He saw a lot of himself in Matthews, but feared the Packers would not be able to draft him. Analysts were shocked when the Packers traded up for Matthews, whom they did not regard as a first-round draft prospect due to his limited playing experience at USC (only starting the final ten games of his senior season.) Greene later stated that Matthews has a "set of skills that I have not seen in an outside linebacker. Clay has a set of skills that I didn't have. He has another gear I didn't have. He's better than Kevin Greene was."

Matthews scored his first career touchdown during a Monday Night Football game on October 5, 2009, against the Minnesota Vikings when he stripped the ball from running back Adrian Peterson and ran the ball back for a touchdown.

In Week 10 against the Dallas Cowboys, Matthews had another outstanding game: recording one tackle, recovering two fumbles forced by cornerback Charles Woodson, and sacking Dallas quarterback Tony Romo to make him a nominee again for the Pepsi NFL Rookie of the Week. For the second time in as many nominations, Matthews was voted Rookie of the Week for his performance.

In Week 12 against the Detroit Lions, he made three tackles, assisted on two more, and sacked Daunte Culpepper twice. He was nominated for and won the Pepsi NFL Rookie of the Week award for his performance.

Matthews had arguably the best game in his young career in Week 13 when he was awarded the NFC Defensive Player of the Week award. Matthews had six tackles, two sacks and a forced fumble in the Packers' 27–14 win over the Baltimore Ravens.

In the Packers' December 13, 2009, contest against the Chicago Bears at Soldier Field, Matthews recorded his eighth sack of the season which put him into a three-way tie with former Packers Tim Harris and Vonnie Holliday for the team record of most sacks in a rookie season (1982–present). The following week, Matthews recorded two more sacks against the Pittsburgh Steelers to claim the rookie record.

He was added to the 2010 Pro Bowl NFC squad, replacing Lance Briggs. He was the first Packers' rookie to earn a Pro Bowl selection since wide receiver James Lofton in 1978.

Matthews recorded 51 tackles, 10 sacks, seven pass deflections, three fumble recoveries, and a forced fumble in his rookie season. He played in all 16 games, starting at ROLB in 13 of them. Matthews led the Packers in QB pressures with 45.5. He finished third for the NFL Defensive Rookie of the Year, losing to his former USC teammate Brian Cushing. Matthews was named NFC Defensive Rookie of the Year and set the Packers franchise record for most sacks in a season by a rookie, with 10.0.

==== 2010 ====
Matthews took a different approach to the game in the 2010 season. After seeing him double-teamed and constantly chipped by running backs in the NFC wild card game against the Arizona Cardinals, Dom Capers decided to move Matthews around the field. Matthews eventually ended up playing mostly at LOLB, but he would roam around the field, playing also at the ROLB position and sometimes in the middle. Matthews finished the season with 60 tackles, 13.5 sacks (fourth in the league), four pass deflections, two forced fumbles, and an interception through 15 games in 2010. He became the first Packer to record six sacks in the first two games of the season and had 8.5 sacks in the first five weeks, but slowed down the latter part of the season (five sacks in the last 10 games due to a stress fracture in his lower leg). He earned NFC Defensive Player of the Week for Weeks 2 and 9. Matthews was named to the 2011 Pro Bowl NFC roster for the second straight year and was named to the All-Pro team for the first time in his career. Matthews was awarded with the NFL's defensive player of the month award for September after recording six sacks in the first two weeks of the 2010 season. Matthews recorded a career-high 55.0 quarterback pressures. He was named SN-NFL Defensive Player of the Year and NFC Defensive Player of the Year, and won the Butkus Award. Matthews finished a close second (17 votes to 15) to Troy Polamalu in the AP NFL Defensive Player of the Year voting, notable in that both led their defenses to Super Bowl XLV.

Matthews set the Packers franchise record for most sacks in a single postseason with 3.5. In the Super Bowl, won by the Packers over the Pittsburgh Steelers, he recorded three tackles, a pass deflection, and a game-changing forced fumble. On the first play of the fourth quarter with the Steelers driving to take the lead with the score 21–17 in favor of Green Bay and the ball on the Packer 33-yard line, he tackled Steelers running back Rashard Mendenhall, who fumbled the ball, recovered by Desmond Bishop. This play was featured by NFL Films SoundFx, where Matthews was mic'd up. While in the defensive huddle before the play, Matthews mentioned to his teammates that he knew the play would be coming off the right side of the offensive line, saying, "I have a feeling they're going to run on this side, (the offense) is all looking at me." He called for teammate Ryan Pickett to "spill it", which meant making Mendenhall redirect his running path further from the center of the line of scrimmage. Matthews' instincts on this tone-setting play is primarily featured in the Green Bay Packers Hall of Fame. The Packers never lost the lead, winning their fourth Super Bowl title and first since Super Bowl XXXI, 31–25. He was ranked 19th by his fellow players on the NFL Top 100 Players of 2011.

==== 2011 ====
Matthews finished the 2011 season with 50 tackles, and a career-low six sacks despite playing 15 of the 16 games. He led the Packers in quarterback pressures for the third straight season, with 53.5. Although some of his numbers plummeted from the previous season, Matthews improved in other aspects of his game. He recorded a career-high three interceptions, nine pass deflections, and three forced fumbles. Matthews also recorded his third career defensive touchdown by picking off Eli Manning for a pick-six. Matthews played almost exclusively at the LOLB position, not roaming around the field like he did the previous season due to the struggling defense. Matthews did not play a single snap at the ROLB position until Week 11 and finished the entire season with only seven rushes from the ROLB spot. Matthews claimed he had his best overall season despite the low numbers. The Packers struggled to find pass pressure from the side opposite of Matthews and the loss of defensive end Cullen Jenkins due to free agency and safety Nick Collins due to a career-ending neck injury, placed the Packers last in total defense despite leading the league in interceptions, with 31. Linebacker coach Kevin Greene stated that he has never seen a pass rusher get double teamed as much as Clay had that season. The defensive line struggled, finishing the season with six total sacks after recording 18 the year before. Matthews was named to his third-straight Pro Bowl as a starter. He was ranked 27th by his fellow players on the NFL Top 100 Players of 2012.

==== 2012 ====
Heading into the 2012 season, the defense needed to improve. Finishing with the 32nd-ranked defense in the NFL was described by Matthews as "unacceptable". The Packers picked six straight defensive players in the draft, including Matthews' former teammate, Nick Perry, out of USC. Because of Perry's larger size (10 pounds heavier) and not being accustomed to playing pass coverage, he was put at the LOLB position, and Matthews was moved back to the ROLB position he played at in his rookie year. The Packers hoped that by drafting Perry, as well as Michigan State DE Jerel Worthy and Iowa DE Mike Daniels, opposing teams would no longer be able to consistently double-team Matthews, allowing pressure to open up on all sides.

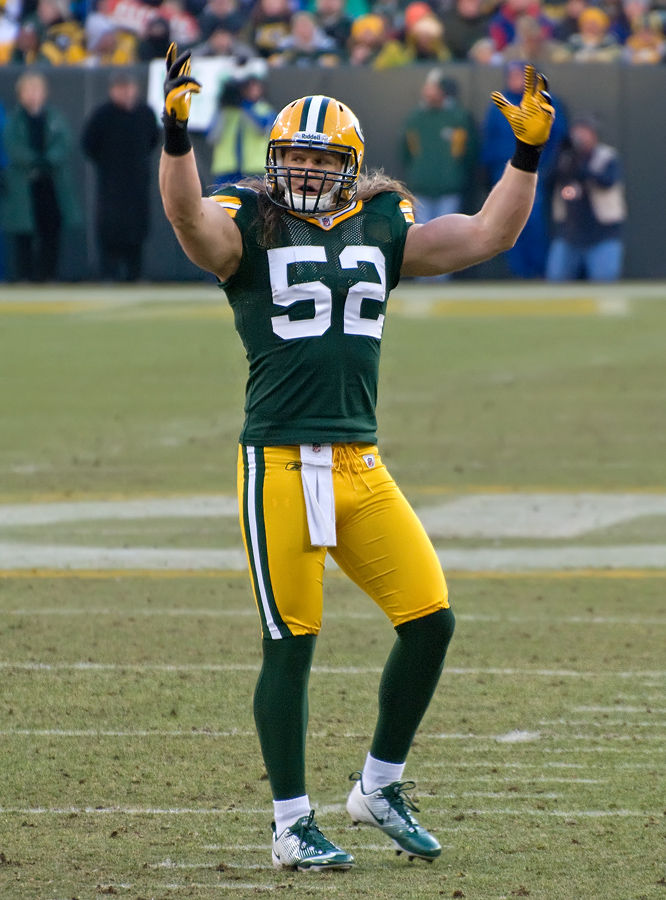
Matthews in 2012

Prior to the 2012 season, Sporting News ranked Matthews as the second-best outside linebacker in the league, only behind Cowboys' star DeMarcus Ware. Matthews started the season with a bang. He recorded 2.5 sacks in the 30–22 season opener loss to the eventual NFC champion San Francisco 49ers and then posted a career-high 3.5 sacks against the Chicago Bears on Thursday Night Football. Matthews became one of only six players in NFL history to record six or more sacks in the first two games of the season, and is the only player ever to do it twice. Entering Week 9 against the Arizona Cardinals, he was second in the league in sacks with nine. Matthews had to leave the game in the second half after his left hamstring started to tighten up. He was eventually ruled out for Weeks 11 through 13. After missing four straight games with the hamstring injury, Matthews recorded six tackles, two sacks, and a pass deflection in a 21–13 victory over the Chicago Bears. This victory crowned the Packers as NFC North champions for the second year in a row. Matthews totaled three tackles and a sack in a 37–34 season ending loss to the Minnesota Vikings. He finished the season with 43 tackles, 13.0 sacks (fifth in the league), two passes defended, and a forced fumble. Matthews was selected to his fourth straight Pro Bowl, but dropped out due to injury, and was named to the All-Pro team for the second time. He was ranked 31st by his fellow players on the NFL Top 100 Players of 2013.

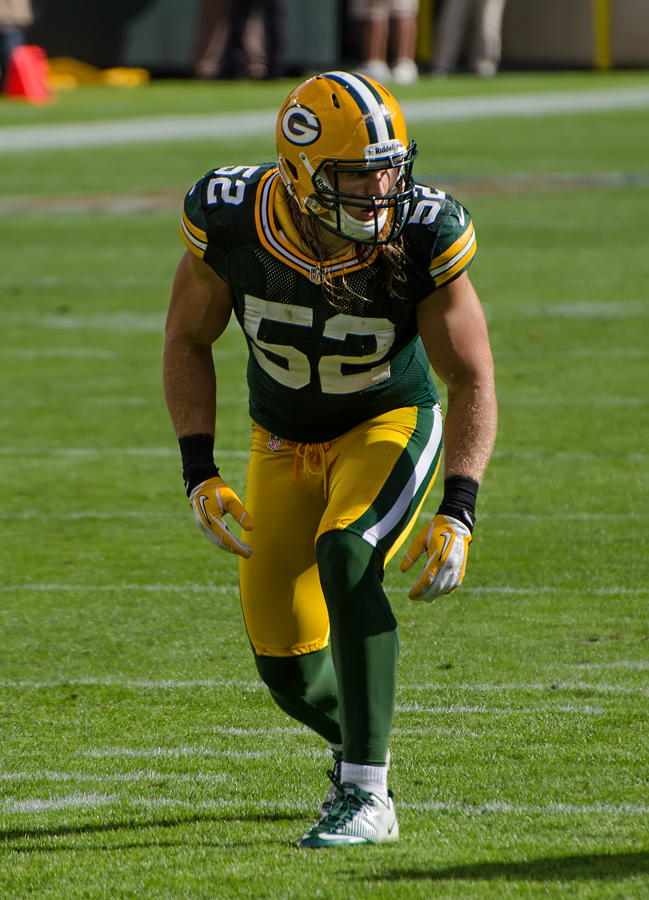
Matthews in 2012

In the off-season, Matthews became the highest-paid linebacker in NFL history when the Packers and he made a deal worth $66 million over the next five seasons.

==== 2013 ====
Playing in only 11 games during the 2013 season, Matthews recorded 41 tackles (26 solo), a team-high 7.5 sacks, and three forced fumbles. During the Packers' Week 5 matchup with the Detroit Lions on October 6, 2013, Matthews broke his right thumb and missed the next four games. On November 10, in a game at home against the Philadelphia Eagles, Matthews returned to the playing field, donning a large "club" cast over his entire right hand. Without the ability to use his fingers to grab or apply pressure or leverage, Matthews was left to be fairly ineffective during this game. The following week, he returned to the field with a less restrictive device that allowed his fingers to remain free. The device seemed to improve his performance the following week. After completing only two tackles (one solo) with no sacks, stuffs, hits, or hurries on the quarterback against the Philadelphia Eagles, in the Packers' Week 11 match-up against the New York Giants the following week, Matthews had four tackles, including a sack with the less restrictive device. After the Giants game, Matthews went on to accumulate 4.5 more sacks and 17 tackles (10 solo) over the next five weeks. In Week 16, during the second to last game of the regular season against the Pittsburgh Steelers, Matthews refractured his thumb sacking Ben Roethlisberger and was out for the remainder of the season. He was ranked 77th by his fellow players on the NFL Top 100 Players of 2014.

==== 2014 ====
Prior to the 2014 season, the Packers signed veteran free agent Julius Peppers to bring an additional pass rush to help Matthews. After a Week 8 loss to the New Orleans Saints, where the Packers defense gave up almost 500 yards of offense, including 172 yards rushing from Mark Ingram, Packers defensive coordinator Dom Capers and head coach Mike McCarthy decided to alter Matthews' position, alternating him between outside linebacker and middle linebacker during games, depending on the play call. The move paid huge dividends for both Matthews and the Packers defense, as the defense improved drastically over the final eight games of the season. After spending the first half of the season ranked near the bottom in the league in defense, the Packers finished the season ranked a respectable 14th in the NFL in total defense. Matthews' sack numbers also increased in the second half of the season. After only getting 2.5 sacks in the first eight games, Matthews had 8.5 sacks in the final eight games, including back-to-back two-sack games against the Buffalo Bills and Tampa Bay Buccaneers. He earned NFC Defensive Player of the Week for his game against the Buccaneers. Matthews finished the season with 11 sacks, nine passes defended, one interception (his first since 2011), and two forced fumbles. For the first time in his NFL career, Matthews started every game during the regular season. He was named to his fifth Pro Bowl. He was ranked 51st by his fellow players on the NFL Top 100 Players of 2015.

==== 2015 ====
Matthews helped lead his team to the NFC Divisional Round playoff game against the Arizona Cardinals, a game that it lost 26–20 in overtime. Matthews made comments that the Packers should have touched the ball in overtime and "go to college rules". He earned Pro Bowl honors for the sixth time. He was ranked 57th on the NFL Top 100 Players of 2016.

Matthews was among the athletes indicated in "The Dark Side: Secrets of the Sports Dopers", an episode of Al Jazeera Investigates, documenting illegal performance-enhancing drugs use. (In August 2016, after an investigation, the NFL cleared Matthews and two other of its players of wrongdoing, citing "no credible evidence".)

Every Friday during the football season, Matthews appeared on Wisconsin's Afternoon News with John Mercure on Newsradio 620 WTMJ to discuss football.

==== 2016 ====
In the 2016 season, Matthews appeared in 12 games and started nine. He recorded 24 tackles, of which 20 were solo, five sacks, and one forced fumble. Despite posting a career-low in tackles and sacks, Matthews was ranked 82nd by his peers on the NFL Top 100 Players of 2017.

==== 2017 ====
Matthews receiving a ship's ball cap from David Robinson Jr. (Command Master Chief of the USS Green Bay) during a July 28, 2017, practice

On September 28, 2017, during the Week 4 game against the Chicago Bears, Matthews became the Packers' all-time sack leader when he sacked the Bears' quarterback Mike Glennon. On December 10, 2017, during a game against the Cleveland Browns, Matthews recorded a key quarterback pressure in overtime. This pressure resulted in an interception to secure a victory for the Packers. Before and after the game, Matthews donned a Clay Matthews Jr. Browns #57 jersey as an homage to his father. Matthews finished the 2017 season with 7.5 total sacks and 3 pass deflections. Matthews was double-teamed for most of the season, finishing with 39 total tackles. Matthews forced a fumble and recovered a fumble as well.

==== 2018 ====
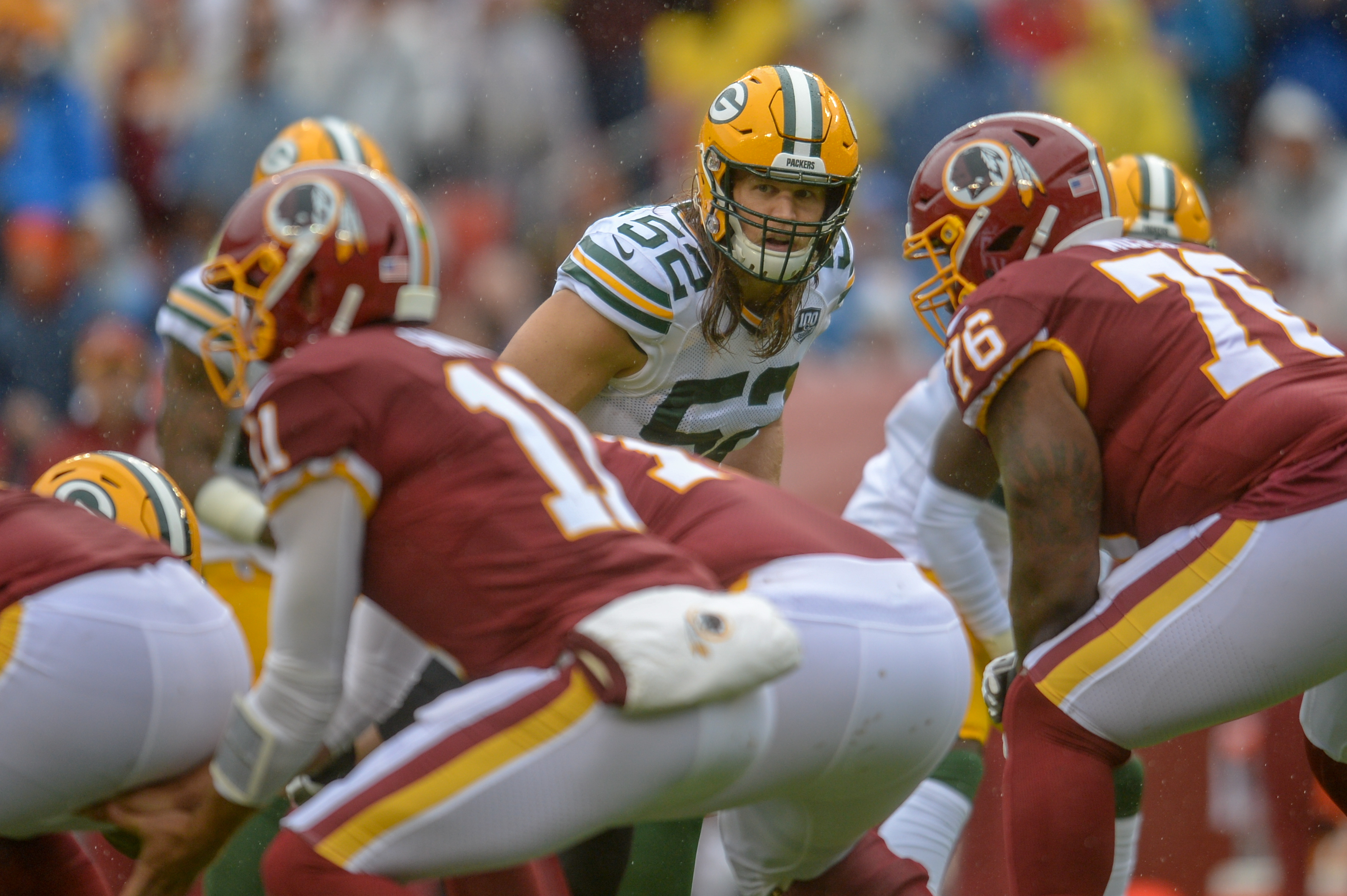
Mathews in 2018

On June 2, 2018, Matthews, who was pitching to Packers offensive lineman Lucas Patrick in the off-season Green & Gold Charity Softball Game, had a ball hit directly back to him. The line drive resulted in a broken nose for Matthews; surgery followed the incident. During the Packers' training camp for 2018, Matthews decided to wear a visor to add additional protection for his rhinoplasty. Matthews wore an Oakley, Inc. style clear visor with a Speedflex revolution helmet. During Week 2 against the Minnesota Vikings, Matthews was called for a controversial roughing the passer penalty that nullified an interception with 1:37 left in the fourth quarter. The game ended in a 29–29 tie. During Week 3 against the Washington Redskins, Matthews was again called for roughing the passer, becoming the first player to commit three roughing-the-passer penalties in the first three games of the season since 2001, as the Packers lost 31–17.

On October 15, 2018, Matthews recorded his last sack at Lambeau Field. Against the San Francisco 49ers on Monday Night Football, with 3:52 remaining in the 4th quarter, on a 3rd & 10 play from the SF 23, Matthews brought down C. J. Beathard at the SF 11 for a key loss of -12 yards. He finished the 2018 season with 3.5 sacks and 43 total tackles (29 solo).

After the end of the 2018 season, Matthews became an unrestricted free agent.

=== Los Angeles Rams ===
On March 19, 2019, Matthews signed a two-year contract with the Los Angeles Rams.

Matthews made his debut with the Rams in Week 1 against the Carolina Panthers, making three tackles and sacking Cam Newton once as the Rams won 30–27. In Week 2 against the New Orleans Saints, Matthews recorded another sack against Teddy Bridgewater as the Rams won 27–9. In Week 3 against the Cleveland Browns, Matthews sacked Baker Mayfield twice in the 20–13 win. In Week 5, after the Rams' 30–29 loss to the Seattle Seahawks, it was announced that Matthews suffered a broken jaw and would undergo surgery. He ended up missing three games, finishing the season with 13 starts.

In the offseason, on March 19, 2020, Matthews was released by the Rams. On September 10, the Denver Broncos reached out to Matthews in hopes to negotiate a contract, but both sides could not reach an agreement.

=== Retirement ===
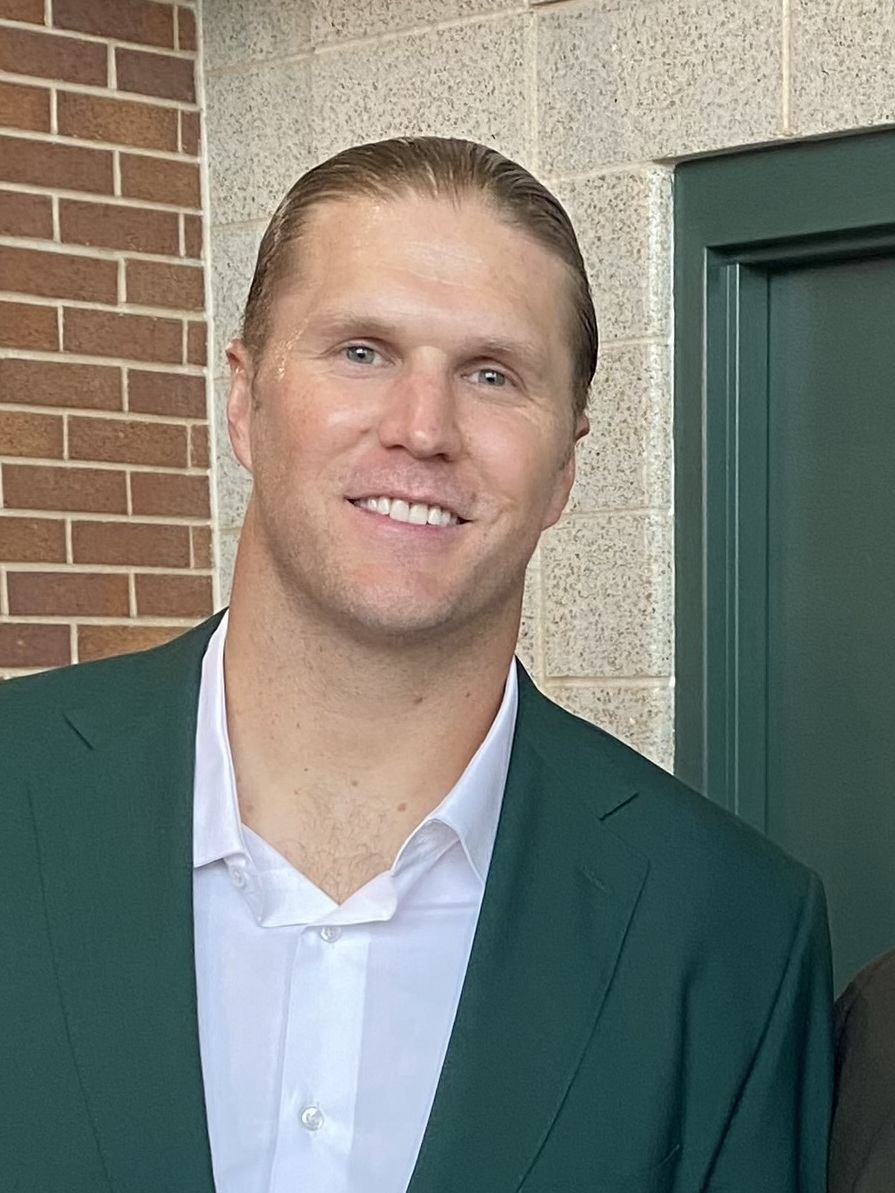
Matthews at his Packers Hall of Fame induction, 2024

After two seasons out of football, Matthews announced his retirement on September 27, 2022. Matthews had stated he "wished he could've finished his career in Green Bay", the team that drafted him and with whom he won a Super Bowl in 2011. On November 15, 2023, it was announced that Matthews, alongside Aaron Kampman, would be inducted into the Green Bay Packers Hall of Fame as the 170th member on August 29, 2024.

== NFL career statistics ==
Legend
	Won the Super Bowl
**Bold**	Career high

=== Regular season ===
Year	Team	Games		Tackles				Interceptions						Fumbles	
Year	Team	GP	GS	Cmb	Solo	Ast	Sck	Int	Yds	Avg	Lng	TD	PD	FF	FR
2009	GB	16	13	51	37	14	10.0	0	0	0.0	0	0	7	1	**3**
2010	GB	15	15	60	**54**	6	**13.5**	1	**62**	**62.0**	**62**	**1**	4	2	0
2011	GB	15	15	50	37	13	6.0	**3**	47	15.7	38	**1**	**9**	**3**	0
2012	GB	12	12	43	32	11	13.0	0	0	0.0	0	0	2	1	0
2013	GB	11	11	41	26	15	7.5	0	0	0.0	0	0	1	**3**	0
2014	GB	16	16	61	**54**	16	11.0	1	40	40.0	40	0	**9**	2	0
2015	GB	16	16	**66**	49	**17**	6.5	1	42	42.0	42	0	3	0	1
2016	GB	12	9	24	20	4	5.0	0	0	0.0	0	0	3	1	0
2017	GB	14	14	43	27	16	7.5	0	0	0.0	0	0	2	1	1
2018	GB	16	16	43	29	14	3.5	0	0	0.0	0	0	0	1	0
2019	LAR	13	13	37	27	10	8.0	0	0	0.0	0	0	3	2	0
Career		156	150	519	383	136	91.5	6	191	31.8	62	2	43	17	5
Source: NFL.com

=== Postseason ===
Year	Team	Games		Tackles			
Year	Team	GP	GS	Cmb	Solo	Ast	Sck
2009	GB	1	1	5	3	2	1.0
2010	GB	4	4	**16**	**14**	2	**3.5**
2011	GB	1	1	5	4	1	0.0
2012	GB	2	2	9	7	2	3.0
2014	GB	2	2	10	7	**3**	1.0
2015	GB	2	2	10	7	**3**	1.5
2016	GB	3	3	3	3	0	1.0
Total		15	15	58	45	13	11.0
Source: pro-football-reference.com

== Personal life ==
Matthews and his wife, Casey Noble-Matthews, have three children together: William Clay IV, Madeline Joy, and Colton. The Matthews family now resides outside of Nashville, Tennessee.

For charity, Matthews agreed to model and test a Depend adult incontinence brief under his uniform during the 2012 season to benefit the Jimmy V Foundation.

Matthews is active in the sports memorabilia circuit; selling exclusive game-used equipment through Fanatics, Inc. and signing autographs exclusively with Waukesha Sportscards in Wisconsin.

Matthews and his wife built a large estate in the Oaks of Calabasas gated community, it went on sale in 2020 with an asking price close to $30,000,000. Atlanta Hawks star Trae Young purchased the home.

== Non-sports media appearances ==
Matthews made an appearance on the February 8, 2011, episode of SmackDown, when he ran down to the ring to assist in Edge's World Heavyweight Championship match against Dolph Ziggler as a backup referee, as Vickie Guerrero was the original special referee for that match. Guerrero injured her ankle (kayfabe) after trying to spear Edge, and he won the match and the championship after spearing Ziggler twice, while she was being attended to at ringside for her injury. Shortly after the second spear, Matthews ran down to the ring to make the three-count and give Edge the win. This episode took place in Green Bay, the same week the Green Bay Packers won the Super Bowl XLV after WWE invited the winning team to the show that is taking place in their hometown.

Matthews and his former Packers teammates Josh Sitton, David Bakhtiari, T. J. Lang, and Don Barclay had cameo appearances in the film Pitch Perfect 2. He also stars in season 1 episode 21 of The Mindy Project, as well as making a cameo in the 2015 film Entourage. Also in 2015, Matthews was primarily featured in an online episode for Houzz. Matthews aided in the renovation of his brother and sister-in-law's Cleveland, Ohio home. Matthews would frequently call in to The Dan Patrick Show during the NFL regular season during his playing career.

In 2018, Matthews was featured along with his wife Casey on Tanked. In their aforementioned Calabasas, California estate, an 800-gallon aquarium was installed in his home library, next to his framed uniform worn in Super Bowl XLV.

Main commercial sponsorships for Matthews during his NFL career included: Nike, Gillette, Verizon, Old Spice, Jack Link's Beef Jerky, Campbell's, Hyundai, Fathead, State Farm (alongside teammates Aaron Rodgers and B. J. Raji) and The Wonderful Company brand pistachios, even with a peanut allergy.

== Notes ==
1.Willie Davis has 99.5 vs Clay Matthews' 83.5 sacks, according to unofficial (pre-1982 season) stats.
