= Clay Matthews Sr. =

American football player (1928–2017)

- Matthews in 1955

No. 46, 83
- Positions: Defensive end, tackle

Personal information
- Born: August 1, 1928; Charleston, South Carolina, U.S.
- Died: March 23, 2017 (aged 88); Mount Pleasant, South Carolina, U.S.
- Listed height: 6 ft 3 in (1.91 m)
- Listed weight: 219 lb (99 kg)

Career information
- High school: Charleston
- College: Georgia Tech
- NFL draft: 1949: 25th round, 247th overall pick

Career history
- San Francisco 49ers (1950, 1953–1955)

Career NFL statistics
- Games played: 45
- Games started: 40
- Stats at Pro Football Reference

William Clay Matthews Sr. (August 1, 1928 – March 23, 2017) was an American professional football player and patriarch of the Matthews family of football players. Matthews played for four seasons as a defensive lineman with the San Francisco 49ers of the National Football League (NFL), the first in 1950. When the Korean War broke out, Matthews enlisted as a paratrooper for the Army's 82nd Airborne Division. In 1953, he returned to the 49ers for three seasons. He played college football for the Georgia Tech Yellow Jackets. He was selected by the Los Angeles Rams in the 25th round of the 1949 NFL draft before being traded to the 49ers.

After completing his NFL career, he began a career in business, eventually becoming the president of Bell & Howell, a manufacturing company.

His father, H. L. Matthews, coached boxing, baseball, and track at The Citadel, The Military College of South Carolina in Charleston, South Carolina.

Matthews' sons, Clay Matthews Jr. and Bruce Matthews, played in the NFL in the 1970s to the 1990s, the latter inducted into the Pro Football Hall of Fame. Four grandsons have played in the NFL as well — Clay Matthews III, Kevin, Jake, and Casey Matthews.

Matthews died at the age of 88 on March 23, 2017, in Mount Pleasant, South Carolina.
