= Clay Matthews Jr. =

American football player (born 1956)

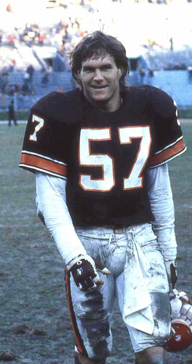
- Matthews with the Cleveland Browns in 1984

No. 57
- Position: Linebacker

Personal information
- Born: March 15, 1956 (age 70); Palo Alto, California, U.S.
- Listed height: 6 ft 2 in (1.88 m)
- Listed weight: 245 lb (111 kg)

Career information
- High school: New Trier (Winnetka, Illinois)
- College: USC (1974–1977)
- NFL draft: 1978: 1st round, 12th overall pick

Career history
- Cleveland Browns (1978–1993); Atlanta Falcons (1994–1996)

Awards and highlights
- Second-team All-Pro (1984); 4× Pro Bowl (1985, 1987–1989); 4× NFL combined tackles leader (1978, 1979, 1981, 1984); Cleveland Browns Ring of Honor; Cleveland Browns Legends; National champion (1974); 2× First-team All-Pac-8 (1976, 1977)

Career NFL statistics
- Tackles: 1,595
- Sacks: 69.5
- Interceptions: 16
- Touchdowns: 1
- Stats at Pro Football Reference

William Clay Matthews Jr. (born March 15, 1956) is an American former professional football linebacker who played 19 seasons in the National Football League (NFL), primarily for the Cleveland Browns. He played college football for the USC Trojans and was selected in the first round of the 1978 NFL draft by the Browns. Matthews played in 278 games, which is currently the 25th-most of all time for a player. Matthews is the father of Clay Matthews III, an All-Pro linebacker and Super Bowl champion, and Casey Matthews, a former American football linebacker; and he is the brother of Hall of Fame offensive lineman Bruce Matthews.

== Early life and college ==
Matthews was born into a football family. His father, Clay Matthews Sr., played for the NFL in the 1950s. In 1974, Matthews graduated from New Trier East High School in Winnetka, Illinois. He and his younger brother, Bruce, both attended college at the University of Southern California, where both played on the USC Trojans football team.

== Professional career ==
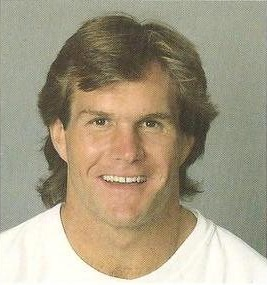
Matthews in 1985

Matthews was drafted by the Cleveland Browns with the 12th pick in the first round of the 1978 NFL draft. He was a four-time selection for the Pro Bowl with the Browns and was a cornerstone of the defense for well over a decade. In 1984, Matthews recorded 12.0 sacks. He was present at some infamous Browns playoff losses during the 1980s, known as Red Right 88 (1981), The Drive (1987), and The Fumble (1988), which stopped those Browns teams from potentially advancing to the Super Bowl. One of his most memorable moments as a Brown was in a playoff game against the Bills on January 6, 1990. With only seconds left in the fourth quarter and the Bills at the Browns' 11-yard line, Matthews intercepted a pass (at the one-yard line) thrown by Bills quarterback Jim Kelly to seal a Cleveland victory. After the 1993 season, Matthews signed with the Atlanta Falcons. In 1995, at the age of 39, Matthews started all 16 games for the Falcons and set a record as the oldest player to record a sack at the age of 40 years, 282 days.

Matthews was named the AFC Defensive Player of the Week twice on the Cleveland Browns (Week 12, 1984 and Week 9, 1991). Matthews and his son, Clay III, are the only father-son tandem to be named Defensive Player of the Week in the NFL.

In 2022, the Professional Football Researchers Association named Matthews to the PFRA Hall of Very Good Class of 2022.

== Life after pro football ==
Matthews resides in Agoura Hills, California. He serves as defensive coordinator at Oaks Christian High School, a co-ed private school in Westlake Village, California which his son Casey attended. Matthews was inducted into the USC Athletic Hall of Fame in 2005, along with his brother Bruce. Matthews also opened a Pontiac car dealership in the Cleveland suburb of Euclid in 1992; it currently operates under new ownership as Sims Buick GMC.

Matthews and his brother Bruce competed with members of their family on the popular TV game show Family Feud, hosted by Richard Dawson. The Matthews family won the game, with Matthews being one of two family members to play in the final round. They ended the game with 41 points total but did not take the $10,000 grand prize.

In 2014, Matthews was named Director of Football Operations at Carter High School (Tennessee), where he once served as an assistant coach.

== Personal life ==
Matthews is married to Leslie Matthews. They have five children: Jennifer, Kyle, Brian, Clay III, and Casey. Clay III and Kyle played football at USC, while Casey was a linebacker for the Oregon Ducks football at the University of Oregon. Clay III was drafted by the Green Bay Packers in the 2009 NFL draft, while Casey was drafted by the Philadelphia Eagles in the 2011 NFL draft.

== NFL career statistics ==
=== Regular season ===
Year	Team	Games		Tackles				Interceptions			Fumbles	
Year	Team	GP	GS	Cmb	Solo	Ast	Sck	Int	Yds	TD	FF	FR
1978	CLE	15	2	34	–	–	1.0	1	5	0	0	0
1979	CLE	16	16	103	–	–	2.0	1	30	0	0	2
1980	CLE	14	13	83	–	–	5.0	1	6	0	0	1
1981	CLE	16	16	128	–	–	5.0	2	14	0	0	2
1982	CLE	2	1	11	–	–	0.0	0	0	0	0	0
1983	CLE	16	16	106	–	–	6.0	0	0	0	4	0
1984	CLE	16	16	126	–	–	12.0	0	0	0	3	1
1985	CLE	14	14	88	–	–	6.0	0	0	0	1	1
1986	CLE	16	16	89	–	–	1.0	2	12	0	2	0
1987	CLE	12	12	72	–	–	2.5	3	62	1	0	2
1988	CLE	16	16	101	–	–	6.0	0	0	0	0	2
1989	CLE	16	16	113	–	–	4.0	1	25	0	3	2
1990	CLE	16	16	102	–	–	3.5	0	0	0	3	0
1991	CLE	15	15	80	–	–	6.5	1	35	0	3	0
1992	CLE	16	16	111	–	–	9.0	1	6	0	3	0
1993	CLE	16	15	83	–	–	5.5	1	10	0	2	0
1994	ATL	15	15	90	71	19	1.0	0	0	0	0	0
1995	ATL	16	16	63	49	14	0.0	2	1	0	0	1
1996	ATL	15	1	12	11	1	6.5	0	0	0	3	0
Career		278	248	1,595	131	34	82.5	16	206	1	27	14
