= League of Denial =

2013 book

- Authors: Mark Fainaru-Wada; Steve Fainaru
- Language: English
- Publisher: Crown Archetype
- Publication date: October 8, 2013
- Pages: 416
- ISBN: 978-0770437541

League of Denial is a 2013 book, initially broadcast as a documentary film, about traumatic brain injury in the National Football League (NFL), particularly concussions and chronic traumatic encephalopathy (CTE). The documentary, entitled League of Denial: The NFL's Concussion Crisis, was produced by Frontline and broadcast on PBS. The book was written by ESPN reporters Mark Fainaru-Wada and Steve Fainaru. The book and film devote significant attention to the story of Mike Webster and his football-related brain injuries, and the pathologist who examined Webster's brain, Bennet Omalu. The film also looks closely at the efforts of researchers led by Ann McKee at Boston University's Center for the Study of Traumatic Encephalopathy, where the brains of a number of former NFL athletes have been examined.

== Production ==
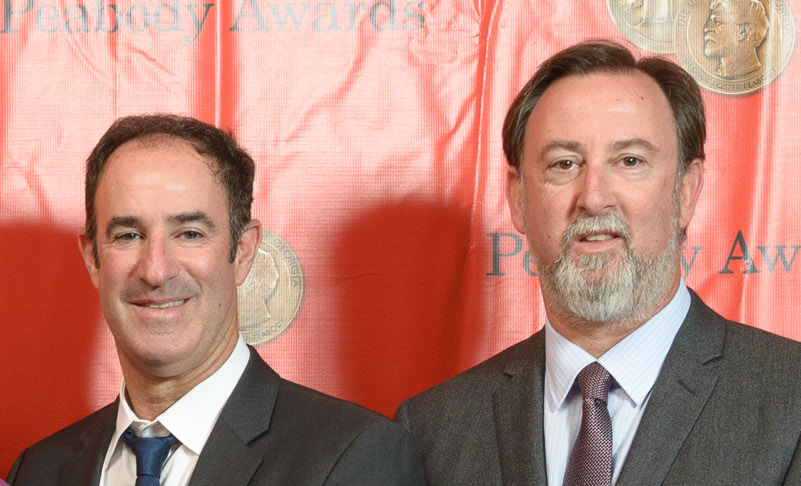
Brothers Steve Fainaru (left) and Mark Fainaru-Wada, co-authors of the book

ESPN had originally been a partner in the project, but backed out later claiming a lack of editorial control. There was speculation that this was due to pressure from the NFL. Although ESPN pulled out of the documentary project, they remain involved in the book deal, including promoting the book on their website, and airing excerpts from the documentary on the program Outside the Lines.

During the documentary, Omalu recalled a discussion with an NFL doctor while reviewing Webster's case. Omalu said the NFL doctor told him "Bennett, do you know the implications of what you're doing? If 10 percent of mothers in this country would begin to perceive football as a dangerous sport, that is the end of football." Frontline in 2010 produced a documentary on health issues in youth sports with a focus on repeated concussions and subconcussive blows in high school football.

The documentary received a Peabody Award in 2013.

== Critical response ==
Response to the documentary was positive, with many reviewers commenting on how powerful it was, and how it may change their views of football going forward, although noting that much of the information had been written about or shown before.

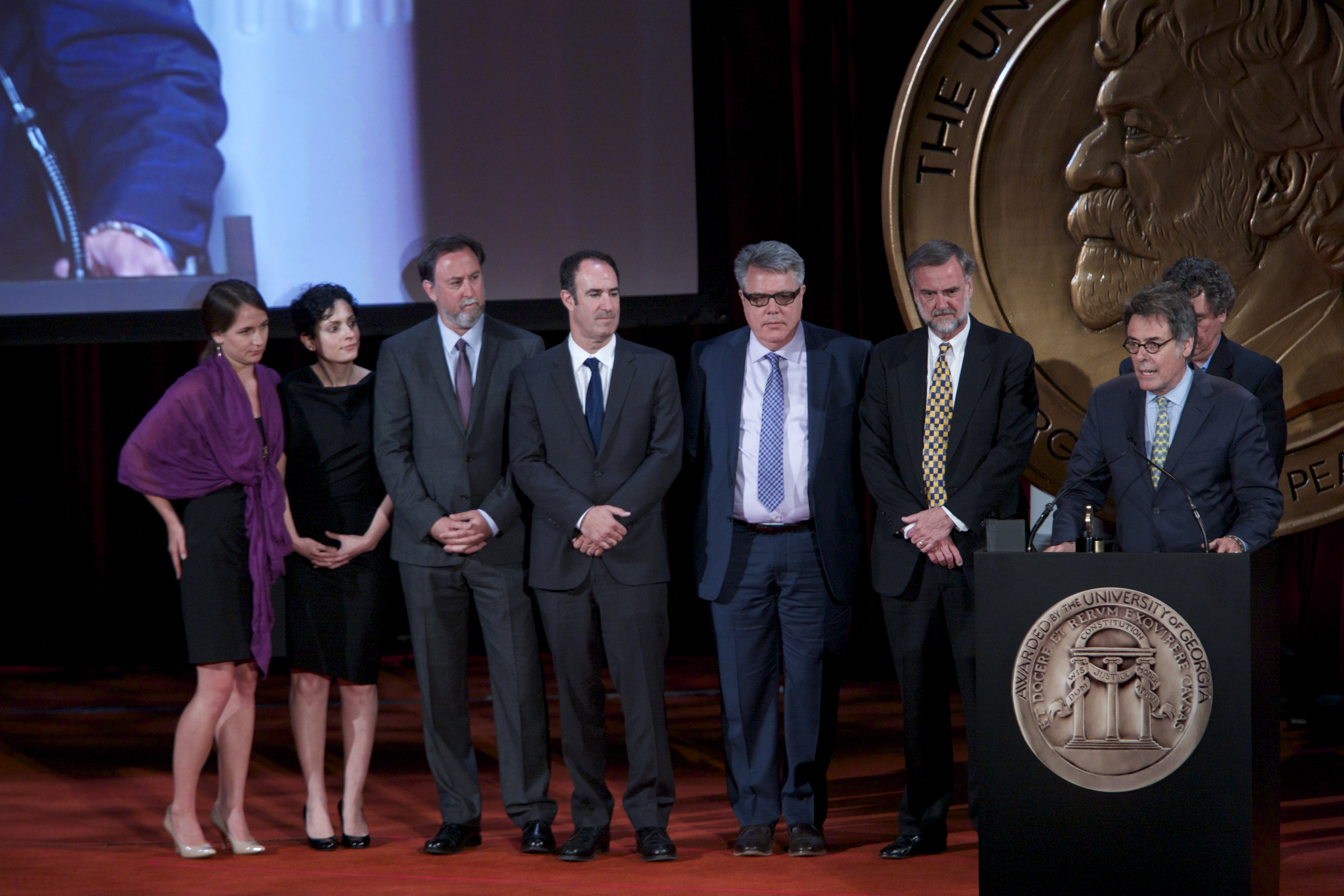
Lauren Ezell, Colette Neirouz Hanna, Mark Fainaru-Wada, Steve Fainaru, Steve Audette, Jim Gilmore, David Fanning, and Michael Kirk accept the Peabody Award for "Frontline: League of Denial: The NFL's Concussion Crisis"

Michael Humphrey from Forbes wrote that "to deny the implications of the show and not, at the very least, take that potential hypocrisy very seriously, would be delusional. If I keep watching [football], it is at my own ethical risk. And I honestly don’t know what I’m going to do." The New Republic wrote that "There is not a ton of brand-new such evidence in the documentary" but that "What is groundbreaking about League of Denial, rather, is the cleanness, coherence, and conciseness of the storytelling". Sean Gregory of Time wrote that it was "a first-rate piece of reporting." The New York Daily News said "The only problem with the much-touted Frontline investigative report League of Denial is that it probably should have been subtitled "Nation of Denial". Kevin McFarland of The A.V. Club wrote "League Of Denial provides an excellent, mandatory two-hour overview of the rise in research on this subject." and "Football is a dead sport walking in the United States. It may look healthy, vibrant, and more profitable than ever. But in a few generations it will be a flimsy husk of itself at its height. The damning evidence is all here in League Of Denial." USA Today wrote "if this documentary made even a sliver of the league's fans, personnel and fellow media stop and reflect for a few hours Tuesday night, it was well worth the exercise."

The New York Times said "The program doesn't give the league much credit for recent rule changes and other safety initiatives, instead underscoring its continuing reluctance to acknowledge a link between the sport and brain injuries and its reliance on language that pushes any day of reckoning into the future." and "Much of this has already been reported, with Alan Schwarz of The New York Times often leading the way, but the program will certainly be eye-opening for anyone—especially parents with children of Pop Warner league age—who hasn't followed the subject closely or seen The United States of Football, a documentary released in August."

NFL senior vice president of health and safety policy Jeff Miller said "[for two decades the league has been a] leader in addressing the issue of head injuries in a serious way" and "By any standard, the NFL has made a profound commitment to the health and safety of its players that can be seen in every aspect of the game, and the results have been both meaningful and measurable."

== See also ==
- Head Games, documentary and book by Christopher Nowinski on repeated trauma in contact sport
- Concussions in sport
- Dementia pugilistica
- Helmet-to-helmet collision
- Concussion
- Tua Tagovailoa concussion controversy
- List of American football films
- List of NFL players with chronic traumatic encephalopathy
