= Boston University CTE Center and Brain Bank =

Boston University brain injury research center

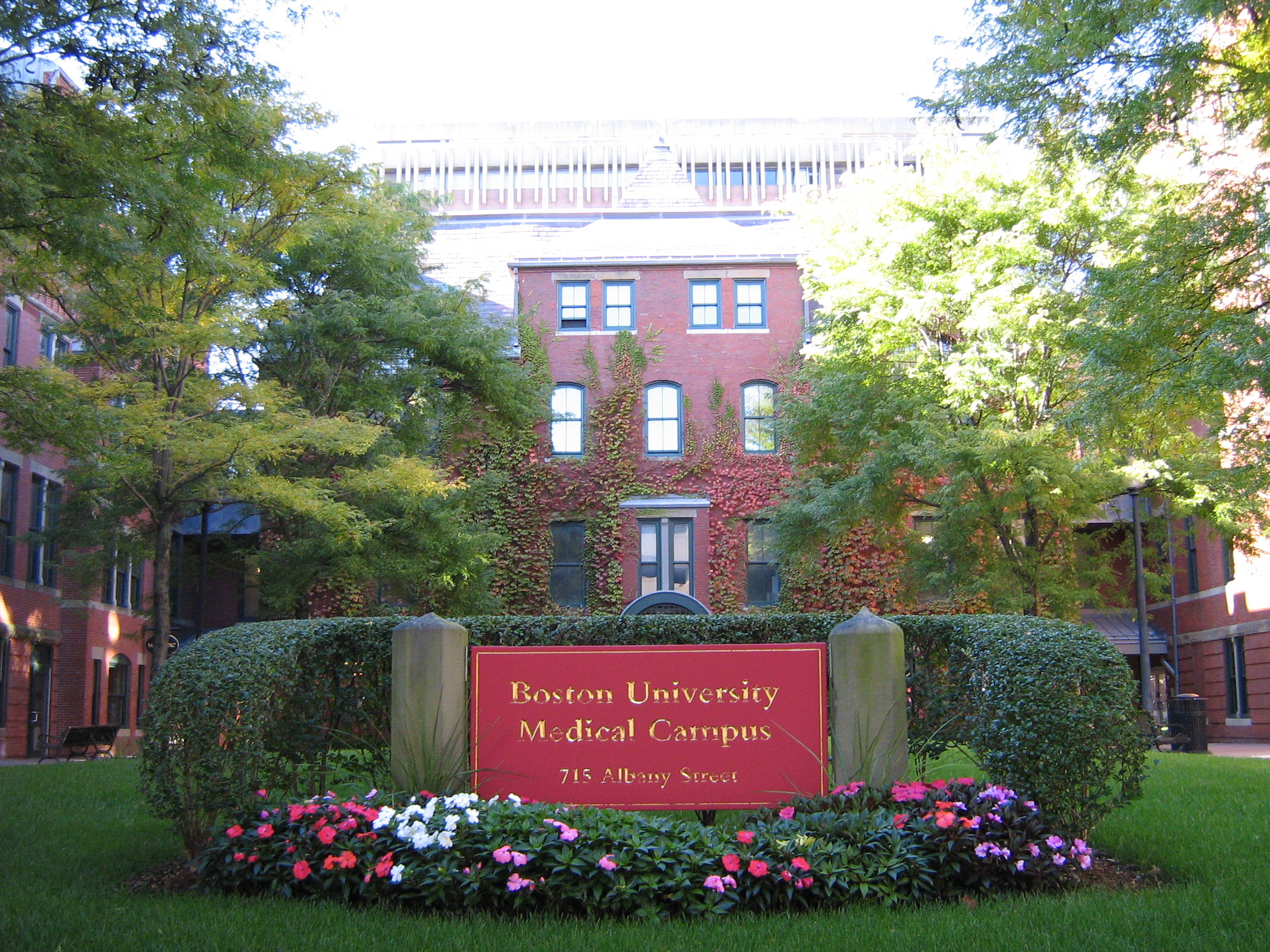
The Boston University Medical Campus hosts the school's CTE Center and Alzheimer's Disease Center

The Boston University CTE Center is an independently run medical research lab located at the Boston University School of Medicine. The Center focuses on research related to the long-term effects of brain trauma and degenerative brain diseases, specializing in the diagnosis and analysis of chronic traumatic encephalopathy (CTE). According to researchers at Boston University, CTE is a brain disease involving progressive neurological deterioration common in athletes, military personnel, and others who have a history of brain trauma. The disease is primarily caused by repeated blows to the head, some of which result in concussions or sub-concussive symptoms.

Symptoms from CTE do not typically appear in a subject until many years after the initial injuries, and a conclusive diagnosis of the disease can only be achieved through autopsy. In the years since its inception, the BU CTE Center and Brain Bank has devoted the majority of its time and effort into researching methods for diagnosing CTE in living subjects and developing potential treatments for the disease.

Although CTE remains mysterious and controversial, researchers have observed a link between the disease and the protein called tau, which slowly forms clumps in the brain that kill brain cells. This often results in subjects experiencing depression, anxiety, memory loss, headaches, and sleep disturbances.

== Formation ==
Boston University's CTE Center was formed as a part of the school's Alzheimer's Disease Center (BU ADC) which was established in 1996. As the prominence of long-term brain injuries continued to grow in the early 2000s, the CTE Center collaborated with the United States Department of Veteran Affairs and the Concussion Legacy Foundation to form the VA-BU-CLF Brain Bank. This Brain Bank was officially formed in 2008, and acts as a subset of the Boston University School of Medicine. A brain bank is designed to act as a central resource for the collection and distribution of brain and brain tissue samples. Brain donors may donate their brains after death to aid in the understanding of neural diseases. Brain banks differ from other organ banks in that donated brains will only be used for research purposes, and will not be given to other individuals.

Ann McKee acts is the Director for the VA-BU-CLF Brain Bank and Boston University CTE Center, leading her team of researchers during group and individual case studies. McKee is aided in directing the Brain Bank by Christopher Nowinski, CEO of the Concussion Legacy Foundation, and Lisa McHale, who acts as the Bank's director for family relations. When the VA-BU-CLF Brain Bank formally opened in 2008, it became the first tissue repository in the world fully dedicated to the study of CTE.

The Brain Bank continues to lead the field of CTE study, as it remains the largest brain tissue repository in the world that focuses on traumatic brain injuries and CTE. In partnership with the VA-BU-CLF Brain Bank, the Boston University CTE Center continues to be the most accomplished CTE research facility in the world, as the Center houses 70% of global CTE cases.

== Mission and practices ==
The goal of the Boston University CTE Center is to collect and study post-mortem brains to better understand the long-term diseases associated with head trauma. Specifically, the CTE Center focuses its research on the formation of neurodegenerative diseases, including Post-Concussion Syndrome and CTE. During case studies, researchers at the CTE Center perform high-impact tests and in-depth autopsies on post-mortem brains to further understand the neuropathology and clinical presentation of CTE. These tests examine the effects of concussions and sub-concussive blows on the brain, specifically as they relate to the development of CTE.

The Center's ultimate goal is to develop a test that would definitively diagnose CTE in a living subject. In order to accomplish this, researchers at Boston University made it a priority to study as many post-mortem brains as possible, which led to the formation of the VA-BU-CLF Brain Bank. Currently, the Brain Bank contains over 600 brains, including 325 brains that have been diagnosed with CTE since the formation of the bank.

The directors of the VA-BU-CLF Brain Bank work with families of former athletes and veterans to create a well-rounded database that researchers can utilize during large CTE case studies. Employees of the Brain Bank collect tissue samples from the central nervous system (brain, eyes, and spinal cord) of deceased athletes, most notably American football professionals, and military veterans. The Bank then stores these samples optimally to ensure proper care and treatment before, during, and after research testing. The Brain Bank directors will also share findings with family members and caregivers of the deceased.

The Brain Bank studies donations from athletes in several sports and from military personnel. Its research on American football has included former high-school, college, semi-professional, Canadian Football League and National Football League players.[9]

== Notable people ==
=== Ann McKee ===
Dr. Ann McKee is the Director of the Boston University CTE Center and a professor of neurology and pathology at the Boston University School of Medicine. Her research focuses on CTE and the late effects of neurodegeneration. Along with her colleagues, McKee has conducted several research studies involving traumatic brain injuries in sports and military situations, and the long-term effects of these injuries. While her largest project has been the formation and expansion of the VA-BU-CLF Brain Bank, McKee is also the director of several other brain banks, all of which are located in Massachusetts.

=== Chris Nowinski ===
Dr. Chris Nowinski is the co-founder and current CEO of the Concussion Legacy Foundation, an organization dedicated to the awareness and prevention of concussions in every level of sport. Concussions in American football is particularly important to Nowinski as he himself experienced a significant brain injury while playing football at Harvard University. Nowinski partnered with researchers from Boston University to create the VA-BU-CLF Brain Bank.

=== Lisa McHale ===
Lisa McHale currently acts as the director of family relations for the VA-BU-CLF Brain Bank, working with families of former athletes to help them understand CTE and the mission of the Boston University CTE Center. McHale joined the Concussion Legacy Foundation in 2010, first acting as the Volunteer and Family Coordinator. McHale has personal experience with families dealing with the effects of CTE, as her husband Tom McHale, a former American football player, died in 2008 due to complications from the disease.

== Notable case studies ==
=== 2009 Case Study ===
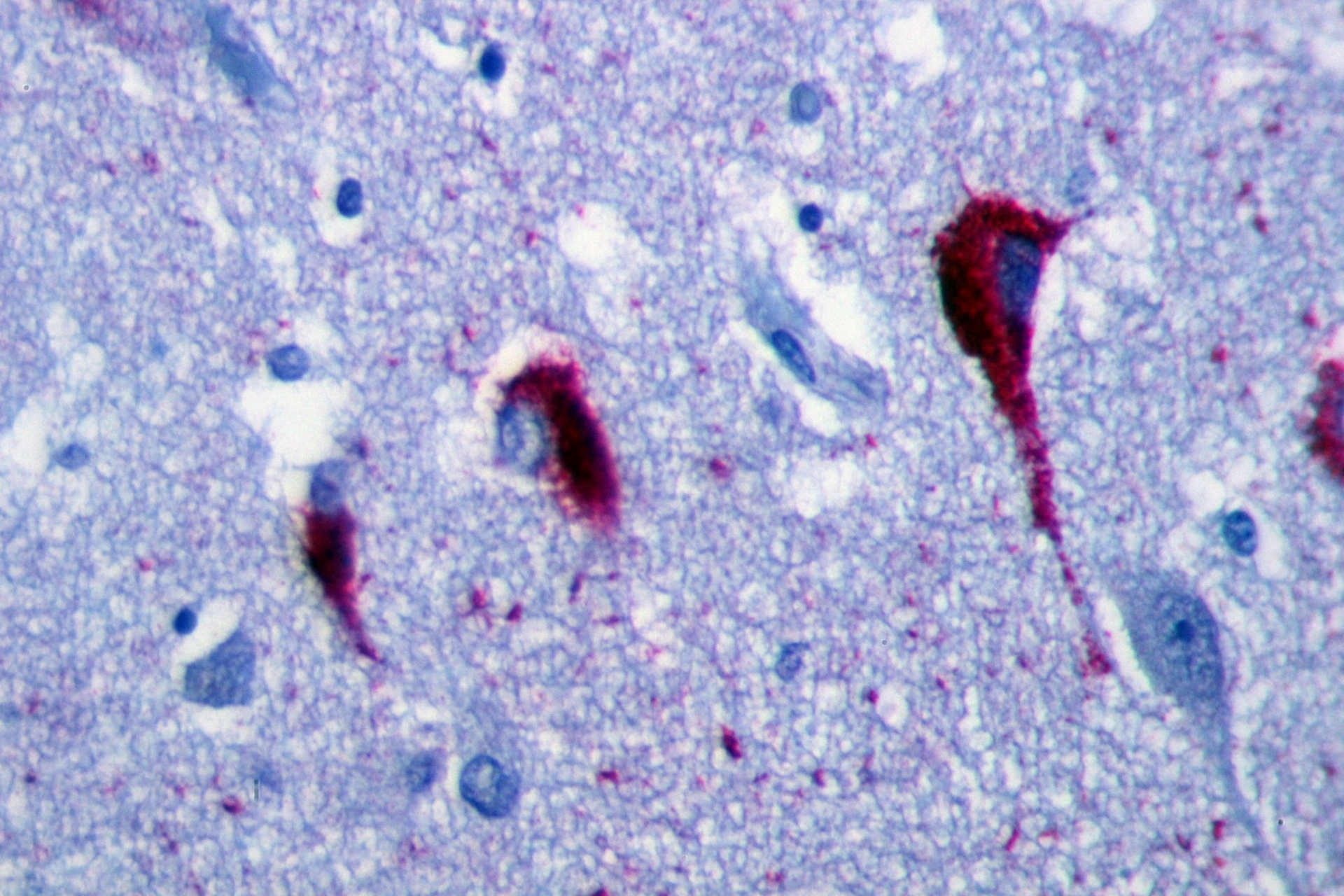
Example of tau pathology in human brain

In 2009, Dr. McKee and her team of researchers from Boston University published their first CTE study. This publication discussed 47 instances of neuropathological deterioration determined to be CTE. The study involved former athletes from a wide range of sports. The majority of the reported CTE cases were former boxers (85%), but the study also included cases from former American football players, soccer players, and wrestlers. The study was primarily conducted to develop a more accurate clinical presentation of CTE in the brain. By studying the brains of former athletes whose sports commonly involved blows to the head, the researchers were able to identify how CTE looked in the brain of a former athlete. Through in-depth autopsies, the researchers observed the formation of proteins in the brain that caused initial brain cell decay, ultimately leading to CTE in the brain.

=== 2015 NFL Case Study ===
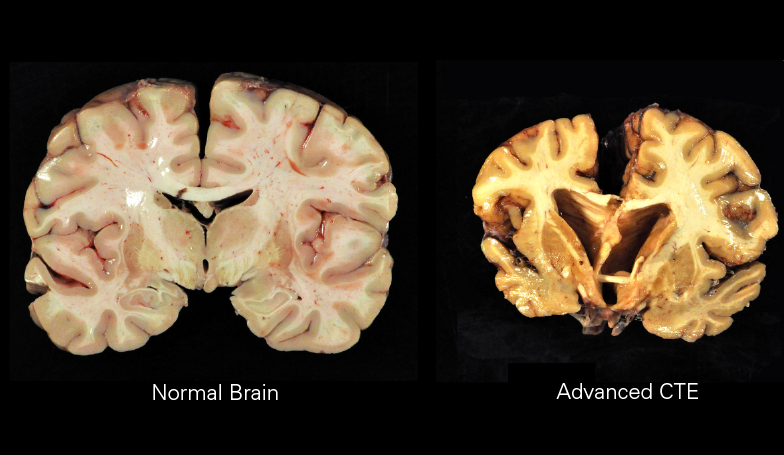
Healthy brain (left) and brain with stage IV CTE (right)

The first major American football study conducted by the BU CTE Center involved the donated brains of 79 former NFL players. This study was released in 2015 and detailed the autopsies performed by researchers on the donated brains and brain tissue. These examinations were performed at both the macroscopic and microscopic levels, in order to identify important neuropathological characteristics of CTE, including how the brain deteriorates over time, and the distribution of proteins in brains with CTE. Through microscopic examination, the researchers were able to confirm the role of the tau protein in CTE diagnosis, as well as other proteins that are signs of this degenerative disease. This tau protein was present in each brain that was diagnosed with CTE, demonstrating its role in the development of the disease.

From these post-mortem tests, researchers were able to detail the characteristics of the various stages of CTE. In the study, the Boston University researchers grouped the subjects into four distinct stages of CTE, with each stage increasing in severity. In stage I CTE, p-tau pathology can be observed in the cerebral cortex, most likely in the area between sulci. In the second stage of CTE, the tau protein is observed in multiple areas of the cerebral cortex, as the p-tau pathology begins to spread across sulci. In stage III CTE, the tau protein becomes widespread, with the greatest severity located in the frontal and temporal lobes. The p-tau groups in these regions are often concentrated in the depths of the sulci. In stage IV CTE, severe p-tau pathology is spread across all areas of the cerebral cortex and temporal lobe. In extreme cases, the tau protein calcarine cortex, which contains the primary visual cortex in the brain. In the study, researchers noted that microscopic signs of p-tau pathology were primarily observed in subjects with Stage III and IV CTE.

=== 2017 American Football Case Study ===
Two years after the Center's 2015 study, researchers from Boston University partnered with Stanford University to conduct autopsies on the brains of 202 deceased former American football players from multiple levels (high school, college, semi-pro, CFL, NFL). Recruitment for this study began in 2008, after the establishment of the VA-BU-CLF Brain Bank. After the success of the 2015 American football case study, donations to the Brain Bank grew, as the link between CTE and American football became clear. These increased donations allowed for a larger case study, which would give researchers an opportunity to paint a clearer picture of the disease in a brain.

Each of the 202 deceased players had a history of brain trauma and experienced behavioral, mood, and cognitive symptoms during their lives. In addition, the most common cause of death among participants was neurodegeneration or suicide. Each brain was evaluated and CTE p-tau pathology for the brains were classified into a stage of CTE. The study showed that of the 202 evaluated brains, CTE was neuropathologically diagnosed in 177 (87%), including 110 of 111 former NFL players (99%). In all cases of CTE, clusters of the tau protein were found in the cerebral cortex, consistent with earlier studies from the CTE Center. These results suggested CTE might be related to participation in football, and higher levels of play may increase the likelihood of the disease.

=== Aaron Hernandez autopsy ===
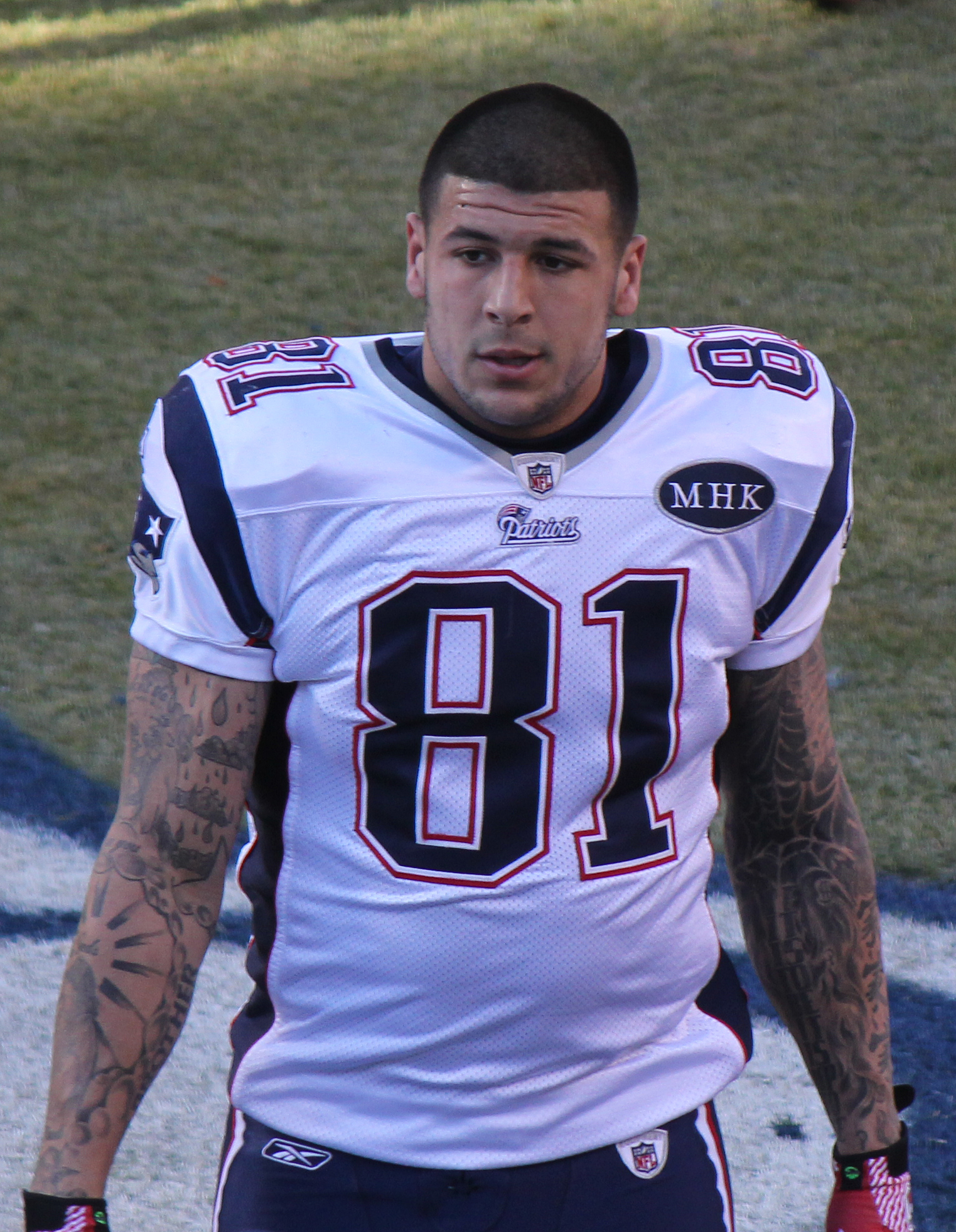
Former New England Patriots Tight End Aaron Hernandez, Subject of the BU CTE Center

In April 2017, former New England Patriots tight end Aaron Hernandez committed suicide in a jail cell at the age of 27. Hernandez's suicide occurred two years after he was convicted of first-degree murder and sentenced to life in prison without the possibility of parole, and just five days after he was acquitted of a separate 2012 double murder. After his death, Hernandez's brain was donated to the VA-BU-CLF Brain Bank, where Boston University researchers, led by Ann McKee, immediately performed an autopsy on the post-mortem brain.

The posthumous examination of the brain showed that Hernandez suffered from stage III CTE, which had previously only been diagnosed in former American football players who were well into their 60s before their deaths. According to McKee, Hernandez's brain presented a classic case of CTE, as multiple groupings of the tau protein could be seen in frontal lobes. These p-tau deposits developed in close proximity to small blood vessels in the brain and spread to areas that control perception, memory, and emotion.

The discovery from Hernandez's autopsy began to shed new light on the impact of CTE in American football players, as well as other athletes. The degree of the CTE present in Hernandez's brain was unprecedented for someone so young. In the autopsy report from Boston University, McKee explains that Hernandez's brain was one of the most intact specimens her team had ever examined. McKee also notes that the damage to Hernandez's brain took years to develop, and was not the symptom of one incident. While the fear of CTE in American football players had grown after initial discoveries from Boston University, most of the cases featured older players who had been retired for several decades before dying. With the study of Hernandez's brain, a new push was established to attempt to find a method for diagnosing the disease in living subjects, and ultimately develop ways to treat the disease.

== Potential applications of CTE research ==
Current CTE research has primarily focused on how the disease could potentially impact the world of sports. Most notably, CTE has been linked with American football at all levels, though the most concerning findings have dealt with retired players from the National Football League. As CTE continues to gain notoriety, research focus has shifted to developing a test for diagnosing the disease in a living person. By studying and diagnosing post mortem brains with CTE, researchers at the Boston University CTE Center have been able to map out the disease in the brain, specifically, the various proteins that develop in an affected brain. The most important of these proteins is the tau protein, that leads directly to the formation of the disease in the brain. This protein forms as a result of blows taken within the skull, resulting in rapid movement of the brain. By analyzing how and where this protein forms within the brain, researchers can potentially map the protein in living individuals, and predict the development of the disease. As research into the disease continues, leaders of the VA-BU-CLF Brain Bank hope to utilize their findings to develop methods for treating and preventing the disease.

== See also ==
- Concussions in sport
- Concussions in American football
- List of NFL players with Chronic traumatic encephalopathy
