= Fainaru =

Fainaru is a surname. Notable people with the surname include:

- Belu-Simion Fainaru (born 1959), Israeli sculptor
- Mark Fainaru-Wada, American journalist and book author
- Steve Fainaru, American journalist, Pulitzer Prize winner
- Joseph Fainaru (1921 Peatra Neamt-2000 Paris), Israeli, French, Canadian Painter Sculptor
