= Alan Schwarz =

American journalist (born 1968)

- Born: July 3, 1968 (age 58); White Plains, New York, U.S.
- Education: University of Pennsylvania (BA)
- Occupation: Journalist
- Known for: Concussion Reporting, Data Journalism

Alan Schwarz (born July 3, 1968) is a Pulitzer Prize-nominated writer and author, formerly at The New York Times, best known for writing more than 100 articles that exposed the National Football League's cover-up of concussions and brought the issue of brain injuries in sports to worldwide attention. His investigative and profile pieces are generally credited with revolutionizing the respect and protocol for concussions in youth and professional athletics. Schwarz's work was profiled in The New Yorker and several films, including the Will Smith movie "Concussion" and the documentaries "Head Games" and PBS Frontline's "League of Denial". The Columbia Journalism Review featured him on the cover of its 2011 Art of Great Reporting issue and wrote of his concussion work, "He put the issue on the agenda of lawmakers, sports leagues, and the media at large — and helped create a new debate about risk and responsibility in sports." The impact of the series was described by Hall of Fame sports writer Murray Chass as "the most remarkable feat in sports journalism history."

== Background ==
Schwarz's mathematics skills are considered one of his strengths as a journalist, particularly in his investigation of football brain injuries and other public health issues. The American Statistical Association honored him in 2013 with its lifetime Excellence in Statistical Reporting award.

Schwarz's could compute square roots when he was 4 years old, and he majored in mathematics at the University of Pennsylvania with the intention of becoming a high school math teacher. But after covering sports for the Penn student newspaper, The Daily Pennsylvanian, he decided to pursue a career in journalism rather than teach. He later explained to an interviewer: "From the start, writing, at least in the way that I do it, became my form of teaching, just at a different blackboard. They are far more similar than people realize: in both, you have an audience looking at you to explain something cogently and compellingly, and your goal is to leave them a little more knowledgeable about it than when they showed up. You have to keep their attention—earn it, reward it, with every sentence."

== Early career ==
Schwarz spent five months at The National Sports Daily before being hired in 1991 by Baseball America, where he was the senior writer until he joined the Times in March 2007. He covered baseball exclusively from 1991 through 2006, writing not only for Baseball America but ESPN The Magazine, Newsweek, Inside Sports and other national publications. (In his bestselling book Moneyball, author Michael Lewis described Schwarz as one of the nation's "best baseball writers".) Schwarz's 2004 book, The Numbers Game: Baseball's Lifelong Fascination with Statistics, profiled baseball's 150-year infatuation with statistics and statistical analysis, dating back to the Civil War. The book was named the "Baseball Book of the Year" by ESPN.

== Concussion reporting ==
In 2005, a mutual friend introduced him to Christopher Nowinski, a former Harvard University football player who later joined World Wrestling Entertainment and had written a book manuscript on football's concussion crisis. Schwarz was one of the few people who recognized the importance of Nowinski's research and later told an interviewer:

"No one thought his book was worth publishing (read: commercially viable). I said that was nuts—this was clearly in important matter that should be put in print if only as a public service. But no one gave it the time of day ... Then, over a year later, in December 2006, Chris called me out of the blue. He said, “Alan, I might have some big news on my hands, and you’re the only one who ever took me seriously.” Andre Waters, the former Philadelphia Eagles safety, had killed himself a few weeks before and Chris was having the brain tissue examined for Chronic Traumatic Encephalopathy, the disease to that point seen almost exclusively in boxers. He had the same brain disease as BOXERS. How many NFL players could also be affected? Furthermore, millions of children play tackle football every week—what about them? Could they be at risk, too? From the start, this was considered by the Times, and me, to be as much of a public-health story as an NFL one. "

Schwarz wrote a front-page Times story on how Waters had been diagnosed with chronic traumatic encephalopathy (C.T.E.) – the brain disease more commonly known as pugilistica dementia, or "punch-drunk syndrome". It was the first news media article on C.T.E. and its effects on football players. The Times hired Schwarz a few weeks later to follow the story.

With each new player diagnosed with C.T.E., and as more players and families went public with retirees’ early-onset dementia, the N.F.L. and its committee of doctors insisted in Schwarz's stories and elsewhere that there was no evidence to connect football with later cognitive disease. One example came in January 2009, when Tom McHale, a former N.F.L. lineman who had recently died at 45, became the sixth player to be diagnosed with C.T.E. High-ranking league executive Jeff Pash said in Schwarz's story in the Times: "There are a great many people who have played football and other contact sports for many years and at high levels who do not appear to have suffered these types of deficits. Whether it's President Ford or major business leaders, whether it's people on television."

Schwarz later told the Columbia Journalism Review how he approached this type of pushback from the league and other doctors:

If I didn’t know anything about neuroscience, I did know enough about Bayesian probability to know that something was different about this group of football players. And when the NFL, or the NFL doctors, tried to tell me that those [six] didn’t mean anything—that their published studies asserting that everything was hunky-dory were the last word on the matter—they were attacking my core belief system. They were telling me that two plus two equaled five, and I knew they were wrong. Because the point is not that there are hundreds of football players out there who are not suffering any of these types of deficits. The point is how many of them are having the deficits, and how that compares to the general population.

“He connected the dots in such a precise, linear way that it was undeniable what he had laid out,” Randall Lane, the editor of Forbes, said in a 2012 interview. “That is what happens when you have a sports writer who happens to be a mathematician.”

Schwarz's influence became so strong that Hall of Famer Jim Brown tweeted, "@alanschwarz ... Stay on the case. We need you." In 2010 Sports Illustrated listed him as one of football's "most powerful people". His articles expanded to examine not just N.F.L. issues but the dangers of head trauma in high school and other youth sports, like girls' soccer and basketball. The U.S. House Judiciary Committee devoted three hearings to the issue of sport-related brain injuries, repeatedly citing Schwarz's work during them. Congressman Anthony Weiner said during a pivotal hearing in October 2009, "I think the record should show beyond any work of any member of Congress ... we probably wouldn't even be here today if it were not for some of the stories that he has written."

In November and December 2009, under significant legislative and public pressure, the N.F.L. ended its denials of the long-term risks of football: It revamped its rules regarding concussion management, suspended its study of retired players' cognitive decline which Schwarz had exposed as improperly designed, and accepted the resignations of the two co-chairmen of a league committee that had conducted questionable research. The N.F.L. also began running the first public service announcement warning young athletes about the dangers of concussions. Following this, state legislatures all over the nation began enacting statutes to require education and stronger rules to keep young athletes safer.

In 2010, a major investigative piece by Schwarz evidenced what were called glaring lapses in the safety standards for football helmets among players of all ages. The story prompted an investigation by the Consumer Product Safety Commission, the introduction of bills in both houses of Congress covering football helmet safety and a call for inquiry by the Federal Trade Commission for false and misleading advertising by manufacturers. The article led directly to Inez Tenenbaum, chairman of the C.P.S.C., to push to partner with the N.F.L. to replace unsafe football helmets in underfunded youth leagues.

Canadian author and New Yorker writer Malcolm Gladwell, who wrote a 2009 profile of football's dangers, has often said that Schwarz deserved most of the credit: "For the life of me I have no idea why he hasn’t won a Pulitzer ... It’s a symptom of some kind of broader social resistance to this message. People, they don’t want to hear it. Because they’ve got a kid or a sibling or a cousin or something or a nephew playing the sport, and they still want to close their eyes and block their ears."

Schwarz's reporting has generally been recognized as leading to the $1 billion-plus settlement to resolve the class-action lawsuit between the N.F.L. and 4,500 retired players over brain injuries. Schwarz appeared on NBC's "Meet the Press" to discuss a column he wrote that demonstrated mathematically that the original terms of the settlement would not be enough to pay the players beyond the settlement.

In June 2011 Schwarz moved to the Times's National Desk to focus on broader public-health issues such as child psychiatry and drug abuse. He left the Times in August 2016 to become a data-storytelling consultant and write two books about mathematics.

== Books ==
- Alan Schwarz, The Numbers Game: Baseball's Lifelong Fascination with Statistics. New York: St. Martin's, 2004 & 2005. ISBN 0-312-32223-2.
- Alan Schwarz, Once Upon a Game: Baseball's Greatest Memories. Boston, MA: Houghton Mifflin, 2007. ISBN 978-0-618-73127-5.
- Alan Schwarz, ADHD Nation: Children, Doctors, Big Pharma, and the Making of an American Epidemic. New York: Scribner, 2016. ISBN 978-1-501-10591-3.

== Awards and recognition ==
- 2007 Associated Press Sports Editors Award for Project Reporting
- 2008 New York Press Club Award for Journalism
- 2009 George Polk Award
- 2009 Associated Press Sports Editors Award for Project Reporting
- 2010 Society of Professional Journalists Deadline Club Award for Sports Journalism
- 2010 New York Press Club Award for Journalism
- 2010 Associated Press Sports Editors Award for Project Reporting
- 2010 Pulitzer Prize for Public Service (finalist)
- 2011 Society of Professional Journalists Deadline Club Award for Public Service
- 2013 American Statistical Association Excellence in Statistical Reporting
