= PEN/ESPN Award for Literary Sports Writing =

The PEN/ESPN Award for Literary Sports Writing was awarded by the PEN America (formerly PEN American Center) to honor "a nonfiction book about sports." The award was established in 2010 and is awarded to a title that is "biographical, investigative, historical, or analytical" in nature. Judges have included Robert Lipsyte, Tim O'Brien, and Susan Orlean. In June 2019 ESPN announced it would no longer partner with PEN. The awards have not been rebooted by PEN as of April 2021.

Presented in conjunction is the PEN/ESPN Lifetime Achievement Award for Literary Sports Writing. This award is given to an American or U.S.-based writer to honor "their body of work and long-term contributions to the field of literary sports writing." The award was established in 2011 and includes an honorarium of US$5,000. Candidates are nominated by PEN Members.

The award is one of many PEN awards sponsored by International PEN affiliates in over 145 PEN centers around the world. The PEN American Center awards have been characterized as being among the "major" American literary prizes.

== Award winners ==
Year	Category	Writer	Title	Ref.
2010	Lifetime Achievement Award			
2010	Literary Sports Writing	Marshall Jon Fisher	A Terrible Splendor	
2011	Lifetime Achievement Award	Roger Angell		
2011	Literary Sports Writing	George Dohrmann	Play Their Hearts Out	
2012	Lifetime Achievement Award	Dan Jenkins		
2012	Literary Sports Writing	Dan Barry	Bottom of the 33rd: Hope, Redemption, and Baseball's Longest Game	
2013	Lifetime Achievement Award	Frank Deford		
2013	Literary Sports Writing	Mark Kram, Jr.	Like Any Normal Day	
2014	Lifetime Achievement Award	Dave Anderson		
2014	Literary Sports Writing	Mark Fainaru-Wada and Steve Fainaru	League of Denial	
2015	Lifetime Achievement Award	Bob Ryan		
2015	Literary Sports Writing	John Branch	Boy on Ice: The Life and Death of Derek Boogaard	
2016	Lifetime Achievement Award	John Schulian		
2016	Literary Sports Writing	Scott Ellsworth	The Secret Game: A Wartime Story of Courage, Change, and Basketball's Lost Triumph	
2017	Lifetime Achievement Award	Bill Nack		
2017	Literary Sports Writing	Joe Nocera and Bill Strauss	Indentured: The Inside Story of the Rebellion against the NCAA	
2018	Lifetime Achievement Award	Dave Kindred		
2018	Literary Sports Writing	Jonathan Eig	Ali: A Life	
2019	Lifetime Achievement Award	Jackie "Mac" MacMullan		
2019	Literary Sports Writing	Rowan Ricardo Phillips	The Circuit: A Tennis Odyssey	
