= Tua Tagovailoa concussion controversy =

2022–2024 NFL controversy regarding repeated concussions

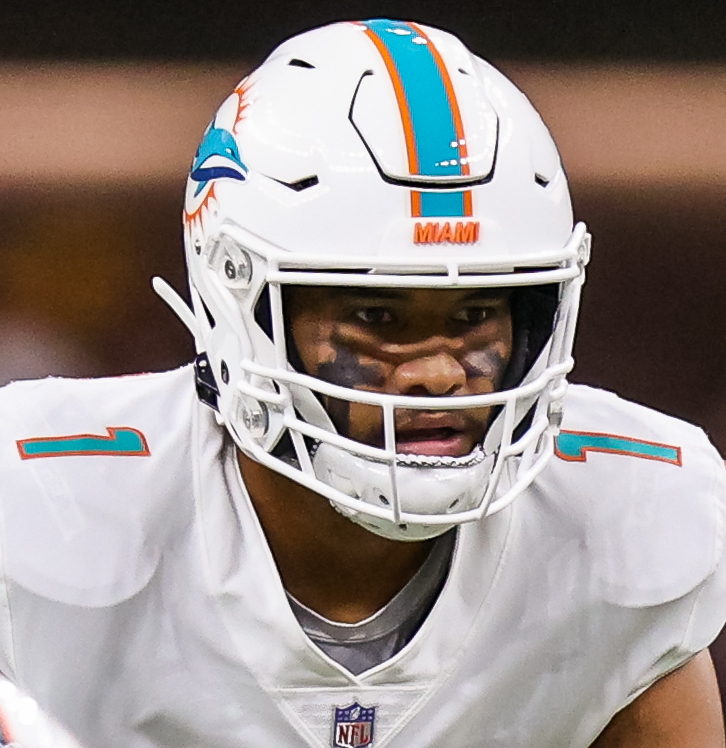
Tua Tagovailoa with the Miami Dolphins in 2021

After Tua Tagovailoa, quarterback of the Miami Dolphins, suffered a series of head injuries during the 2022 and 2024 NFL seasons, controversy ensued in the resulting responses and debates among medical experts, sports figures, and fans surrounding how they were handled. These incidents led to significant changes in the NFL's concussion protocols and sparked widespread discussion about player safety in professional football, especially in the context of chronic traumatic encephalopathy (CTE)'s prevalence in veteran NFL players.

== 2022 NFL season ==
=== Week 3 vs the Buffalo Bills ===
During week 3 of the 2022 NFL season, Tagovailoa sustained his first controversial head injury in a game against the Buffalo Bills at Hard Rock Stadium on September 25, 2022. Tagovailoa's head struck the turf on a play during which a roughing the passer penalty was called against Bills linebacker Matt Milano. After standing up, Tagovailoa exhibited ataxia, shaking his head and falling to his hands and knees a few seconds later. Despite these symptoms, which would later become mandatory removal criteria, and despite Tagovailoa initially being evaluated for a head injury, Tagovailoa returned to play in the second half after his team attributed his unsteady movements to back spasms.

=== Week 4 vs the Cincinnati Bengals ===
The situation escalated dramatically just four days later during a week 4 Thursday Night Football matchup against the Cincinnati Bengals. Despite being listed as questionable with back and ankle injuries, Tagovailoa started the game while the National Football League Players Association (NFLPA) was still investigating the previous week's incident. During the game, Bengals defensive lineman Josh Tupou tackled Tagovailoa, causing him to exhibit a fencing response—a neurological reaction characterized by rigidly flexed arms—after hitting the ground. This incident, broadcast in prime time, generated significant public outcry regarding player safety protocols.

=== Week 16 vs the Green Bay Packers ===
A third head trauma incident occurred during a week 16 Christmas Day game against the Green Bay Packers. Despite sustaining another impact where his head hit the turf before halftime, Tagovailoa remained in the game, subsequently showing a greatly worsened standard of play and throwing three interceptions in the second half. The injury went undetected by both team medical staff and league spotters, only being diagnosed days later. This incident reignited discussions about player safety, with notable NFL figures like Aaron Rodgers and Robert Griffin III publicly advocating for Tagovailoa to consider ending his season or career over health concerns.

=== Aftermath ===
The cumulative effect of these incidents resulted in Tagovailoa missing multiple games throughout the season due to concussion protocols. As a result, he was ruled out of the Dolphins' first playoff appearance since 2016, a wild card round game against the Buffalo Bills. The Dolphins appointed veteran quarterback Teddy Bridgewater interim starter during Tagovailoa's absence. Following the 2022 season, Tagovailoa revealed considering retirement after family discussions, particularly at his mother's urging. Instead, he dedicated his offseason to preventative measures, including jiu-jitsu training to develop safer falling techniques.

== 2024 NFL season ==
Tagovailoa did not miss any games during the 2023 NFL season. In that season, he led the NFL in passing yards and helped bring the 2023 Dolphins to their best record (11–6) since 2008. During the 2024 off-season, the Miami Dolphins agreed to grant Tagovailoa a four-year contract extension valued at $212.4 million.

=== Week 2 vs the Buffalo Bills ===
During a Week 2 game against the Buffalo Bills that ended in a 31–10 defeat, Tagovailoa sustained his third diagnosed NFL concussion. The incident occurred during a third-quarter play when Tagovailoa lowered his head and forcibly contacted Bills safety Damar Hamlin's forearm, causing his head to be violently jerked and resulting in a fencing response similar to the one he exhibited during the 2022 Thursday Night Football game against the Bengals.

Medical personnel attended to Tagovailoa as teammates knelt nearby. Though able to exit the field independently, he was promptly ruled out for the remainder of the game. Dolphins offensive lineman Austin Jackson, positioned near Tagovailoa during the incident, noted that the quarterback's eyes indicated he "wasn't there all the way," prompting Jackson to immediately take a knee. The concussion also drew immediate concern from the Bills organization, with head coach Sean McDermott expressing his prayers for Tagovailoa and his family following the game. Bills quarterback Josh Allen, emphasizing Tagovailoa's character beyond his athletic abilities, called for community support during his recovery.

=== Aftermath and response ===
In the post-game conference, Dolphins head coach Mike McDaniel reported that Tagovailoa was in "good spirits" but refrained from speculating about future implications. McDaniel emphasized a day-by-day approach to evaluation, stating that timeline considerations were secondary to Tagovailoa's immediate welfare. McDaniel later addressed questions about Tagovailoa's safety to continue playing football by deferring to medical expertise and appropriate evaluation procedures.

Additional reporting following the game revealed a previously undisclosed concussion from Tagovailoa's collegiate career at Alabama in 2019. This injury had occurred simultaneously with a season-ending hip injury, bringing his total to four documented concussions over a five-year span from 2019 to 2024.

Third-year quarterback Skylar Thompson assumed quarterback duties following Tagovailoa's exit. Six weeks after the concussion, Tagovailoa returned to play despite calls from NFL figures and sports pundits for him to sit out longer or to retire for his long-term health.

== Responses ==
=== 2022 ===
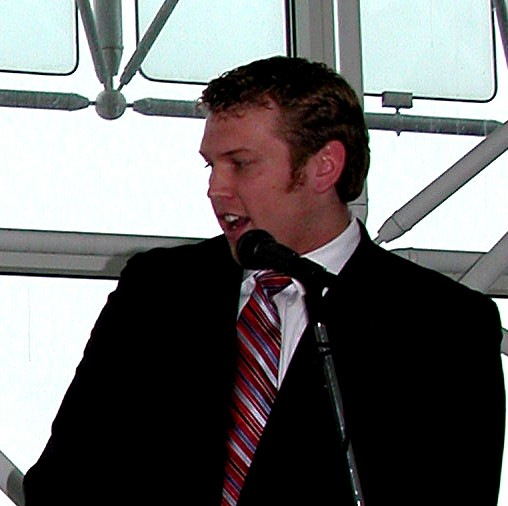
Former football player and head of the Concussion Legacy Foundation Christopher Nowinski

Tagovailoa's 2022 concussions prompted strong reactions from across the NFL community. President and co-founder of the Concussion Legacy Foundation Christopher Nowinski tweeted prior to the Thursday Night game, calling Tagovailoa's immediate return right after suffering a head injury four days earlier a step backwards for NFL concussion care, and saying that "everyone will be sued and will lose their jobs" if Tagovailoa received another concussion during the game. Following Tagovailoa's concussion that game, Nowinski called it the "worst-case scenario" for his health and harshly criticized the NFL's injury protocol and lack of strictness in withholding injured players from returning.

Baltimore Ravens coach John Harbaugh described the situation as "astonishing," noting its unprecedented nature in his four decades of coaching experience. Philadelphia Eagles quarterback Jalen Hurts, who was a college teammate of Tagovailoa's at the University of Alabama, expressed concern for the latter's health and noted how frightening it was for everyone involved.

Coach McDaniel defended the team's decisions despite acknowledging the gravity of the situation. He emphasized his personal relationship with Tagovailoa and the organization's claimed player-first approach, stating that he would not have risked a player's health if any concerns had been present. The coach noted an immediate recognition of concussion symptoms during the Cincinnati incident, observing that Tagovailoa was noticeably different from his usual self.

==== NFL–NFLPA joint investigation ====
The consecutive incidents four days apart during the 2022 season prompted immediate action from the NFL and NFLPA. NFLPA President JC Tretter expressed outrage over the situation, identifying what he termed "no-go" symptoms in both incidents. The players' association emphasized its commitment to investigating the decision-making process and holding responsible parties accountable.

A joint investigation between the NFL and NFLPA revealed deficiencies in the existing concussion protocols, leading to the implementation of the "Tua Rule". This amendment explicitly added ataxia to a list of "no-go" symptoms requiring immediate player removal from games. Key changes included the mandatory removal from play for any player diagnosed with ataxia, the elimination of previous provisions allowing players to return if instability could be attributed to non-neurological causes, and the implementation of stricter observation protocols by independent certified athletic trainers. The revised protocol was demonstrated immediately when Dolphins backup quarterback Teddy Bridgewater was removed from a subsequent game after an independent spotter observed potential instability following a hit. The incidents also sparked review of the nature of roughing the passer penalties, with statistical analysis showing decreased roughing penalties compared to previous seasons.

Additionally, the NFLPA terminated the unaffiliated neurotrauma consultant involved in the Week 3 decision, citing multiple procedural errors and communication issues during the subsequent investigation.

=== 2024 ===
==== Concerns and calls for retirement ====
Las Vegas Raiders head coach Antonio Pierce explicitly recommended retirement for Tagovailoa during a press conference. Pierce emphasized the importance of long-term health over athletic career longevity, particularly regarding family. Pro Football Hall of Fame tight end Tony Gonzalez, speaking as an Amazon Prime analyst, suggested that Tagovailoa seriously consider retirement, framing the decision from a parental perspective. Nowinski emphasized that while there was no specific number of concussions that necessitated retirement, multiple concussions can lead to chronic symptoms and mental health disorders caused by CTE and related neurological disorders.

Former Denver Broncos tight end Shannon Sharpe expressed concern about the escalating severity of Tagovailoa's concussions with regards to considerations on when and if he should return to play. Chris Borland, who famously retired after one NFL season due to neurological health concerns, highlighted the unique pressures facing franchise quarterbacks in making decisions on whether to return to play or to retire for the sake of long-term health.

NFL contract tracker Spotrac noted that voluntary retirement would result in Tagovailoa forfeiting $124 million of his contract, whereas medical retirement would allow him to collect the full amount.

==== Analysis ====
Reeves Wiedeman described the response to Tagovailoa's 2024 concussion and subsequent return to play as "The End of the NFL’s Concussion Crisis" in an article of the same title. He noted that despite increased coverage of and public awareness surrounding NFL play and CTE, the league's popularity had increased, with revenue growing from $10 billion in 2012 to over $20 billion by 2024. This growth occurred alongside, rather than in opposition to, greater awareness of concussion risks, which included discoveries of 90% of examined former players' brains showing CTE, annual NFL concussion numbers increasing in recent years, and a limited ability for experts to diagnose CTE in living players suggesting that the numbers may be even higher than previously known.

Wiedeman remarked that the NFL allowing Tagovailoa to quickly return to play despite calls for his retirement to avoid further long-term neurological impacts represented the NFL's stance of informed consent rather than comprehensive prevention. Wiedeman described the approach as emphasizing player autonomy in decision-making and the acceptance of inherent risks in tackle football, while being transparent about known risks and focusing on reducing "avoidable" contact. He compared the general public's approach to the controversies as similar to the COVID-19 pandemic or climate change, where even those who recognized the severity of the issue still emphasized "personal responsibility" towards NFL players rather than "collective action" by the NFL.

== See also ==
- Health issues in American football
- Concussions in American football
- NFL controversies
- List of NFL players with chronic traumatic encephalopathy
