= Head Games (film) =

2012 American documentary film directed by Steve James

Head Games (2012)
- Directed by: Steve James
- Produced by: Bruce Sheridan; Steve James; Anthony Athanas; Casey Cowell; Jon Cronin; Steve Devick; Andrew E. Filipowski; Frank J., Jr. & Jacqueline C. Murnane; Hank Neuberger; Jim O'Donovan
- Cinematography: Dana Kupper; Keith Walker
- Edited by: David E. Simpson
- Music by: BIlly Corgan; Craig J. Snider
- Distributed by: Variance Films
- Release date: September 21, 2012
- Running time: 91 minutes
- Country: United States
- Language: English

Head Games is a 2012 documentary film that examines the effects of repeated concussions and subconcussive blows, particularly those associated with sports. It focuses on American football and hockey, but also covers boxing, soccer, lacrosse, and professional wrestling. It covers findings that chronic traumatic brain injury is occurring in female sports. Also covered is physiological evidence of brain injury in adolescent athletes.

Head Games is directed by Steve James, director of the highly acclaimed documentary, Hoop Dreams. It is a film followup to Christopher Nowinski's book, Head Games.

The film features interviews with Nowinski (founder of the Sports Legacy Institute), Dr. Robert Cantu (a professor of neurosurgery at Boston University School of Medicine, Dr. Ann McKee, and Robert Stern, who are experts on chronic traumatic encephalopathy). In addition to other medical experts, it also extensively interviews athletes, their families, and journalists.

== Details ==
=== Title ===
Head Games was inspired by the book Head Games written by former Ivy League football player and WWE wrestler Christopher Nowinski.

== Cast ==
Head Games: The Global Concussion Crisis (2014)

- Bob Costas
- Brendan Shanahan
- Robert Cantu, MD
- Ann McKee, MD
- Robert Stern, PhD
- Hunt Batjer, MD
- Gary Dorshimer, MD
- Ruben Echemendia, PhD
- Douglas Smith, MD
- Steven Galetta, MD
- Laura Balcer, MD, MSCE
- Christina Master, MD
- Dr. Willie Stewart
- Dr. Barry O'Driscoll
- Dr. James Robson
- Greg "Diesel" Williams
- Dr. Alan Pearce
- David Dodick, MD
- Dr. Huw Williams

Head Games (2012)

- Christopher Nowinski
- Alan Schwarz
- Keith Primeau
- Cindy Parlow Cone
- Bob Costas
- Isaiah Kacyvenski
- Bill Daly
- Brendan Shanahan
- Robert Cantu, MD
- Ann McKee, MD
- Robert Stern, PhD
- Hunt Batjer, MD
- Gary Dorshimer, MD
- Ruben Echemendia, PhD
- Douglas Smith, MD
- Steven Galetta, MD
- Laura Balcer, MD, MSCE
- Christina Master, MD
- Eric Laudano, M.H.S., A.T.C.

== Critical and media reception ==
Head Games was a critical success, winning Best Documentary at the 2012 Boston Film Festival and Sports Illustrated Best Sports Movie of 2012. Head Games was also an official selection for both the 2012 International Documentary Film Festival Amsterdam and the 2012 Sprout Film Festival. The films was also noted in iTunes Best of 2012 and Rotten Tomatoes Top Movies of 2012.

Roger Ebert gave the film three stars noting that "the documentary by Steve James paints a devastating picture of the long-term consequences of head injuries among pro NFL players." Ebert also called Head Games one of the year's "best documentaries." The New York Times stated "Head Games gains credibility and power from compassion for athletes and respect for their accomplishments. But it also tries to open the eyes of sports lovers to dangers that have too often been minimized and too seldom fully understood." The Pittsburgh Post-Gazette listed the film as one of the year's best films.

In March 2014, UK Distributor Dogwoof announced that it would be a launching doc-centric digital distribution platform entitled IF365 to help filmmakers get their work on top digital platforms. IF365 will use Dogwoof's relationship with platforms such as iTunes and Netflix to showcase feature documentaries including Head Games: The Global Concussion Crisis.

== See also ==
- List of American football films
