= George Dohrmann =

American journalist

- Born: George Anderson Dohrmann; February 14, 1973 (age 53); Stockton, California, U.S.
- Education: Notre Dame (B.A.); University of San Francisco (M.F.A.)
- Occupation: Sportswriter
- Known for: Investigative reporting
- Children: Jessica
- Parent(s): George and Suzette

George Dohrmann (born February 14, 1973), is an editor and writer for The Athletic, the 2000 Pulitzer Prize winner for beat reporting, and author of Play Their Hearts Out, which received the 2011 PEN/ESPN Award for Literary Sports Writing.

== Background and career ==
In college, he wrote for Notre Dame's student newspaper, The Observer.

In 2000, while working at the St. Paul Pioneer Press, Dohrmann won a Pulitzer Prize for a series of stories that uncovered widespread academic fraud in the University of Minnesota men's basketball program. The Citation says,

Awarded to George Dohrmann of St. Paul Pioneer Press for his determined reporting, despite negative reader reaction, that revealed academic fraud in the men's basketball program at the University of Minnesota.

A few months after winning the prize he joined Sports Illustrated where he worked as a senior writer dealing with investigative projects into college basketball, college football and soccer.

Dohrmann published his first book, Play Their Hearts Out: A Coach, His Star Recruit, and the Youth Basketball Machine, on October 5, 2010, through Ballantine Books. The book was the result of more than eight years of investigative work. The book "reveals a cutthroat world where boys as young as eight or nine are subjected to a dizzying torrent of scrutiny and exploitation. At the book's heart are the personal stories of two compelling figures: Joe Keller, an ambitious coach with a master plan to find and promote 'the next LeBron,' and Demetrius Walker, a fatherless latchkey kid who falls under Keller's sway and struggles to live up to unrealistic expectations."

Awards
Associated Press Sports Editors, second place, enterprise reporting, 1995.
Associated Press Sports Editors, second place, investigative reporting, 1996.
Winner of the Pulitzer Prize for Beat Reporting, 2000.
Winner of the Award for Excellence in Coverage of Youth Sports, 2010. Play Their Hearts Out
Winner of the PEN/ESPN Award for Literary Sports Writing, 2011. Play Their Hearts Out

Career
Los Angeles Times, staff writer, Sports section, 1995–1997.
St. Paul Pioneer Press, staff writer, Sports section, 1997–2000.
Sports Illustrated, senior writer, 2000–2015

Works

- Play Their Hearts Out: A Coach, His Star Recruit, and the Youth Basketball Machine (unabridged ed.). Random House LLC. 2010. ISBN 978-0345523167.
- Hand-Me-Down Dream (Essay): Father, Son, and the Burden of Basketball (unabridged ed.). Random House LLC. 2012. ISBN 978-0345530127.

== See also ==
- List of Notre Dame Journalists and Media personalities
- 2000 Pulitzer Prize
- PEN/ESPN Award for Literary Sports Writing
- Sports Illustrated – click [show] in infobox "Staff writers" section
