= Play Their Hearts Out =

2010 nonfiction book by George Dohrmann

- First edition cover
- Author: George Dohrmann
- Language: English
- Subject
- Genre: Non-fiction, sports
- Publisher: Ballantine Books
- Publication date: October 5, 2010
- Publication place: United States
- Media type: Print (Hardcover)
- Pages: 422
- ISBN: 978-0-345-50860-7
- OCLC: 500797258

Play Their Hearts Out: A Coach, His Star Recruit, and the Youth Basketball Machine, by George Dohrmann, is an exposé of the underbelly of grassroots youth basketball in the AAU. The author follows the lives of the coach and players of an elite team, documenting the exploitation and manipulation of the children and their families by coaches seeking the best players, and the influence of shoe and sports gear companies seeking to use the sport to promote their products. Dohrmann is a senior writer with Sports Illustrated.

== Synopsis ==
Published by Ballantine Books, Dohrmann's first book was the result of more than eight years of investigative work. Joe Keller, the coach Dohrmann tracked over those eight years, was a grassroots basketball coach in the Inland Empire in the mid-1990s when he discovered a young Tyson Chandler. Keller and his wife committed most of their time to the team and taking care of Chandler, but Keller stepped back from coaching when his wife suffered a miscarriage. Returning to coaching a few years later, Keller saw that it would be difficult to break into the high school ranks again, so he put together a team that he could coach from elementary through high school, identifying Demetrius Walker as his star player.

Keller essentially became Walker's guardian as he assembled a team around him, the Inland Stars, who quickly dominated teams from around the West Coast thanks to Walker's size and low-post presence — including a dominating 67-point win over a Seattle team led by a young Peyton Siva. However, Keller's coaching deficiencies — a short fuse, a reliance on a gimmicky trap defense nicknamed Fist, and a refusal to adjust the team's offense when defenses zeroed in on Walker — meant the team lost in major national tournaments early on. In an infamous moment, Keller missed the birth of his daughter in 2003 while the team played in the national tournament in Georgia but failed to win it all.

As Walker's star and Keller's coaching profile rose, Keller renamed the team Team Cal and began to pull in players from beyond the Inland Empire. However, Keller rigged practices to favor Walker, alienating talented players like Roberto Nelson and Aaron Moore, chose an inferior player over a more talented player (and original team member) to secure funding from the player's father, and simply went silent on players he felt were unworthy of playing for his team, including a young Darius Morris, the only player from Keller's teams to be an NBA draft pick. Team Cal won the 2004 national tournament, delivering on the promise Keller saw in Walker, who was eventually named the top recruit in his class by The Hoop Scoop. Keller also consented to Walker being the subject of a Sports Illustrated feature story despite concerns about the pressure it would put on Walker.

Keller was eventually able to secure a deal with Adidas to outfit the team and license "Jr. Phenom" branded camps around the U.S., which quickly turned six-figure profits each year. After establishing the camps and becoming an influential figure in grassroots basketball, he began to recede from coaching and from Walker's life just as the player began to struggle in high school. Walker was unprepared to play in high school as he stopped getting taller; never taught the fundamental skills to play point guard or on the wing, he faked injuries to avoid competition and his recruiting offers quickly dried up. Cut off by Keller after hiding in the bathroom during an Adidas all-star camp, Walker was able to rebuild part of his recruiting hype thanks to a sympathetic high school coach who taught him the basics and a transfer to a more prominent high school, funded by the same wealthy parent Keller had relied on with Team Cal. However, his trust in his new grassroots basketball coach led Walker to an ill-advised commitment to USC, a pledge he hastily reneged days before National Signing Day.

In the final game of his grassroots career, Walker threw down a highlight reel dunk in a 16-point loss against the same Seattle team he had beaten by 67 several years earlier; much like Keller had hoped with his team, the Seattle squad had grown and developed together over those eight years. Walker transferred to an Arizona high school as a senior to be closer to his mother and won a state title, his first trophy since the nationals triumph in 2004. Eighteen of Keller's players eventually received Division I scholarship offers, including Walker, who committed to Arizona State and transferred to New Mexico and Grand Canyon.

== Awards ==
- Winner of the Award for Excellence in Coverage of Youth Sports, 2010.
- Winner of the PEN/ESPN Award for Literary Sports Writing, 2011.

== Reviews ==
Ryan Hockensmith of ESPN the Magazine said, "It's one of the best sports books I've ever read." Melanie Collins of the Big Ten Network said, "The writing was so strong and the detail and insight made the book something I could not put down... At times, I was so enraged I was physically angry."

== See also ==
- PEN/ESPN Award for Literary Sports Writing
