= Christopher Nowinski =

American neuroscientist and professional wrestler

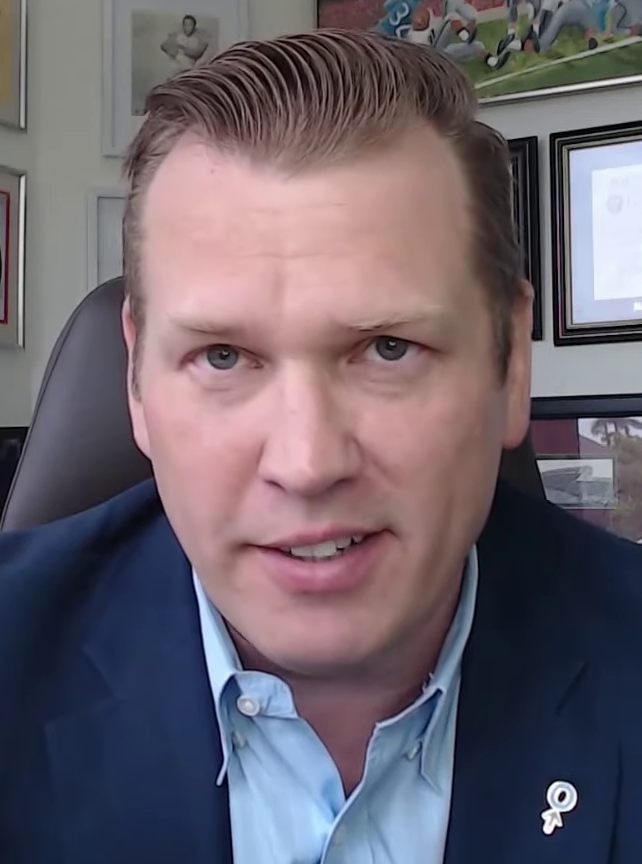
- Nowinski in 2024
- Born: Christopher John Nowinski; September 24, 1978 (age 48); Oak Park, Illinois, U.S.
- Education: Harvard University (AB); Boston University (PhD)
- Occupations: Co-founder and CEO of Concussion and CTE Foundation; Author; Professional wrestler
- Years active: 2001–2003 (professional wrestling)
- Notable work: Head Games: Football's Concussion Crisis
- Spouse: Nicole Roderman (m. 2013)
- Professional wrestling career
- Ring name(s): Chris Harvard; Chris Nowinski; Christopher Nowinski; Harvard Chris
- Billed height: 6 ft 5 in (196 cm)
- Billed weight: 270 lb (122 kg)
- Trained by: Al Snow; Killer Kowalski; Tazz
- Debut: June 29, 2001
- Retired: July 12, 2003

Christopher John Nowinski (born September 24, 1978) is an American neuroscientist, author and retired professional wrestler. After extensively researching concussions in American football, Nowinski co-founded the Concussion and CTE Foundation, where he is currently CEO, and co-founded Boston University's CTE Center. As a professional wrestler, he is best known for his tenure with World Wrestling Entertainment (WWE).

== Early life and education ==
Nowinski attended John Hersey High School in Arlington Heights, Illinois, serving as team captain of the football and basketball teams. He graduated cum laude from Harvard with a Bachelor of Arts in sociology in 2000. Nowinski played college football for the Crimson as a defensive tackle, earning second-team All-Ivy League honors. He worked as a pharmaceutical and biotech consultant in Boston shortly after graduation.

In 2017, he graduated with a Ph.D. in Behavioral Neuroscience from Boston University. He decided to study behavioral neuroscience after a 2003 head injury caused multiple symptoms, including a three-year-long headache.

== Professional wrestling career ==
=== Early career (2001–2002) ===
Nowinski did not begin watching professional wrestling until his senior year of college. After graduating from Harvard, he joined Killer Kowalski's wrestling school in Malden, Massachusetts. Nowinski became one of the three finalists on WWE's (at the time trading as WWF) first season of Tough Enough, which Maven Huffman won. After failing to win the competition, Nowinski made appearances in independent promotions in Massachusetts before being hired by WWF and entering its developmental territories. Nowinski competed as Chris Harvard, capitalizing on his status as an alumnus of Harvard University. Nowinski made his first major independent appearance in London, UK for the Frontier Wrestling Alliance promotion at its Lights Camera Action show on December 14, 2001. Nowinski competed in its main event teaming up with Alex Shane to defeat Drew McDonald and Flash Barker. Though this was the only show Nowinski did for the promotion, he regards it as the best promotion he has ever worked for outside of WWE. In early 2002 he continued to work in the independents throughout the States and Heartland Wrestling Association in Ohio.

=== World Wrestling Entertainment (2002–2003) ===
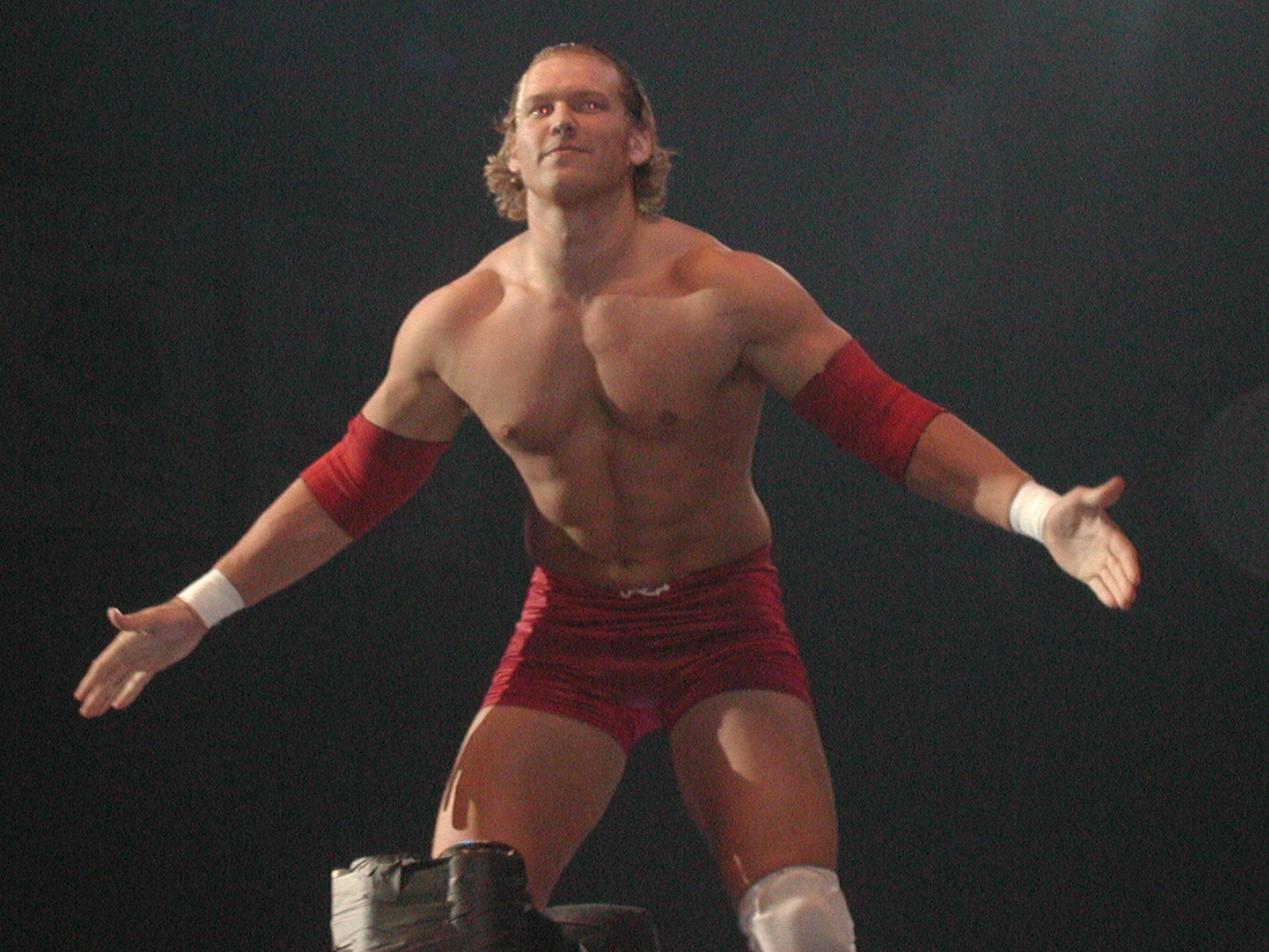
Nowinski at a WWE house show in September 2002

On the June 10, 2002, episode of Raw, Nowinski debuted in WWE as a heel, helping William Regal beat Bradshaw in a European Championship match. Nowinski had a short-lived alliance with Regal, defeating Spike Dudley in his debut match the following week with Regal in his corner. Nowinski teamed with Regal on the June 24 episode of Raw, defeating Bradshaw and Dudley. Nowinski continued to feud with Bradshaw over the next few weeks, with their feud ending on the July 8 episode of Raw, where Nowinski teamed with Jackie Gayda in a losing effort against Bradshaw and Trish Stratus, while also trying to warm up Regal from his breakdown after he lost the European Championship to Jeff Hardy. Nowinski feuded with The Dudley Boyz (Bubba Ray Dudley and Spike Dudley) through the summer.

Nowinski defeated Tommy Dreamer on the September 9 episode of Raw. A week later, Dreamer attacked Nowinski in a classroom. Their feud ended on the October 14 episode of Raw, where Nowinski was once again successful in defeating Dreamer. Over the next few weeks, Nowinski claimed victories over Jeff Hardy and Booker T before starting a feud with his former Tough Enough trainer, Al Snow. On the November 25 episode of Raw, Nowinski went against Maven in a match that ended in a no contest. Nowinski teamed with D'Lo Brown to defeat Snow and Maven on two occasions. Nowinski continued his feud with Maven into 2003, where Test aligned himself with Maven for a few weeks, successfully defeating Nowinski and Brown on January 13, 2003, episode of Raw.

Nowinski competed in his first-ever Royal Rumble match in 2003, entering at #3. During the match Edge and Rey Mysterio performed a double missile dropkick on Nowinski, but a mistimed execution caused Edge to land on Nowinski's head that caused his subsequent post-concussion syndrome later in his career. Nowinski was subsequently eliminated by Mysterio.

Also from February to April 2003, Nowinski made appearances in WWE's developmental territory Ohio Valley Wrestling.

On the March 31 episode of Raw, Nowinski was defeated by Scott Steiner. The feud come to an end on the May 12 episode of Raw, where Nowinski teamed with La Résistance (René Duprée and Sylvain Grenier) in a losing effort against Steiner, Test and Goldust. On the May 26 episode of Raw, Nowinski aligned himself with Thuggin' And Buggin' Enterprises, an African American wrestling stable consisting of Rodney Mack, Jazz and their manager Theodore Long. At Insurrextion, Nowinski teamed with Mack and Long in a losing effort against The Dudley Boyz (Bubba Ray Dudley, D-Von Dudley and Spike Dudley). At Bad Blood, Nowinski and Mack defeated Bubba Ray and D-Von. Nowinski wrestled his final televised match, due to him sustaining post-concussion syndrome, on the June 23 episode of Raw, in a losing effort against Maven. His last match was on July 12 teaming with Rodney Mack defeating Rosey and Tommy Dreamer at a house show in Green Bay, Wisconsin. After a full year of post-concussion symptoms he chose to retire from wrestling.

== Writing career ==
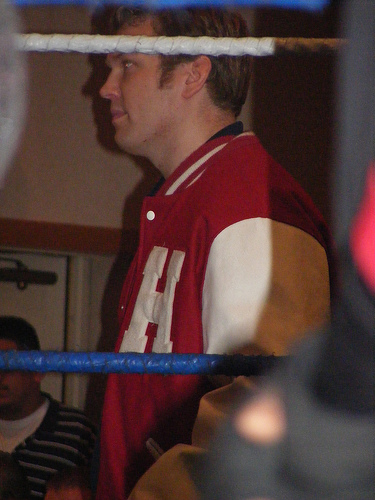
Nowinski appearing at the Killer Kowalski Memorial Show in 2008

Following his wrestling career, Nowinski authored Head Games: Football's Concussion Crisis in 2006, which examined the long-term effects of head trauma among athletes, and also became a documentary. The Lancet said "the book sent shockwaves through the National Football League (NFL)" and details his career-ending injury as well as discussing the dangers of concussions in football and other contact sports. The book includes stories from National Football League (NFL) players and fellow wrestlers, and has an introduction written by former governor of Minnesota and professional wrestler, Jesse Ventura.

Later that year, Nowinski initiated an inquiry into the suicide of Andre Waters, a 44-year-old former NFL defensive back who shot himself on November 20, 2006. Waters had sustained several concussions over his career and, at Nowinski's behest, Waters' family agreed to send pieces of his brain to be tested. Bennet Omalu, a pathologist at the University of Pittsburgh announced that "the condition of Waters' brain tissue was what would be expected in an 85-year-old man, and there were characteristics of someone being in the early stages of Alzheimer's".

Nowinski played a role in the discovery of the fourth case of chronic traumatic encephalopathy (CTE) in a former NFL football player, former Pittsburgh Steelers offensive lineman Justin Strzelczyk, who was killed in an automobile crash in 2004 at age 36. Julian Bailes, the chairman of the department of neurosurgery at West Virginia University and the Steelers' team neurosurgeon during Strzelczyk's career, insisted to Nowinski over a phone conversation that he thought Strzelczyk's death, which was precipitated by strange behavior that some had labeled as "bipolar", was worth looking into due to its similarities to the Andre Waters case. Nowinski contacted Omalu, who discovered the brain was still available, and Nowinski called Mary Strzelczyk, Justin's mother, to ask for permission to Omalu to examine it for CTE. Omalu's positive diagnosis was confirmed by two other neuropathologists.

Nowinski came together with Ted Johnson, former New England Patriots linebacker, on revealing symptoms of concussions after Johnson (who received over half a dozen concussions in his career) retired from the NFL.

Nowinski alerted police and the coroner of Chris Benoit, asking them to do a brain exam on Benoit's brain to see if concussions had any part in his rage or depression at the time of the double-homicide of his family and his suicide. In June 2007, Nowinski co-founded the Sports Legacy Institute (now the Concussion Legacy Foundation), an organization dedicated to furthering awareness of and research on sports-related head injuries, and increasing the safety of contact and collision sports worldwide. Nowinski's work was documented on ESPN's Outside the Lines on September 5, 2007. On the same day, Benoit's brain examination report showed extensive damage due to concussions that could have led to dementia.

== The Concussion and CTE Foundation ==
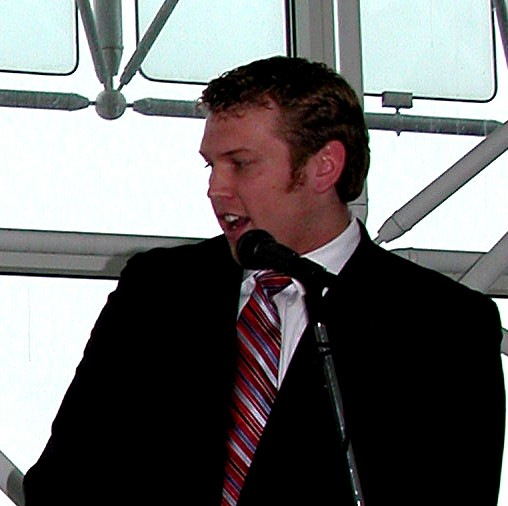
Nowinski in 2005

Since Nowinski's departure from WWE and the publication of his book Head Games, he has garnered a significant amount of media attention, making numerous appearances on networks such as ESPN and CNN to discuss sports-related head injuries. On June 14, 2007, Nowinski and Robert Cantu founded the Concussion and CTE Foundation in Boston, Massachusetts in reaction to medical research indicating brain trauma in sports had become a public health crisis. Postmortem analysis of the brain tissue of former contact sports athletes was revealing that repetitive brain injuries, both concussions and subconcussive blows, could lead to the neurodegenerative disease chronic traumatic encephalopathy (CTE). An absence of awareness and education on concussions, specifically proper diagnosis and management, was allowing the disease to proliferate. Finally, with brain trauma becoming the signature injury of the wars in Iraq and Afghanistan, this research/education model could also be applied to the military.

The Concussion and CTE Foundation was founded to solve the concussion crisis in sports and the military through medical research, treatment, and education & prevention. The initial vision was to formalize neuropathological research and develop and treatment, via partnership with a top-tier university medical school. To that end, the foundation began such a partnership with Boston University School of Medicine (BUSM) in September 2008, collaborating in formation of its CTE Center.

The Concussion and CTE Foundation has sought to develop ways to raise awareness of the issue and to directly educate coaches, athletes and parents and has been featured in articles in The New York Times, on news programs such as 60 Minutes and Frontline, and CNN.

In August 2010, Nowinski took offense to Linda McMahon saying during her Senate campaign that she only met recently overdosed wrestler Lance Cade "once" and said it was "absolutely unsafe to work in that ring. They have no oversight into what actually happens in the ring, and they are encouraging steroid use."

In September 2015, the "Sports Legacy Institute" announced a rebrand and changed its name to the Concussion Legacy Foundation. In 2025, the organization rebranded again to the Concussion and CTE Foundation. The rebrand aimed to align the evolution of the organization's programs with its name.

Nowinski served as co-director at the CTE Center of BUSM, where he worked closely with Ann McKee, M.D., and other center experts, until 2013. Initially, he worked as a liaison making contact with athletes and families of deceased athletes, to further case studies that examine brain tissues impacted by CTE. As of 2020 he serves as the Outreach, Recruitment, Education, and Public Policy Leader.

Hockey News listed Nowinski on its 2011 edition of the 100 Most Powerful people in ice hockey as one of the Top 40 under the age of 40. This recognition was attributed to his ability in getting hockey players to donate brain tissue after death.

In January 2023, Nowinski presented warnings and criticism of an increased prevalence in slap fighting, to include an American based reality show focused on the emerging sport.

== Accomplishments ==
=== Science and business ===
Vice called Nowinski "the man most responsible for making CTE part of the national conversation" and in 2010 Sports Illustrated printed: "It is Nowinski's figure which looms behind the doctors and the headlines and the debate roiling over sports' newfound commitment to minimizing head trauma."

- 2019 Ernst Jokl Sports Medicine Award, United States Sports Academy
- 2018 Industry Difference-Makers, Athletic Business
- 40 under 40, Boston Business Journal, 2017
- Dr. Alan Ashare Safety Award, Massachusetts Hockey, 2016
- President's Medallion Award. Western New England College.2011
- HealthLeaders 20 - People Who Make Healthcare Better, HealthLeaders Media, 2011
- Hockey News 40 Under 40 Most Powerful People in Hockey, 2011
- Sports Illustrated Sportsman of the Year Finalist, 2010
- James Brady Award, Brain Injury Association of Illinois, 2010

=== Professional wrestling ===
- World Wrestling Entertainment
  - WWE Hardcore Championship (2 times)
- Wrestling Observer Newsletter
  - Worst Worked Match of the Year (2002) with Jackie Gayda vs. Bradshaw and Trish Stratus on Raw on July 8

== See also ==
- Concussions in American football
- List of NFL players with chronic traumatic encephalopathy
