= Concussions in American football =

Risk of concussion from playing American football

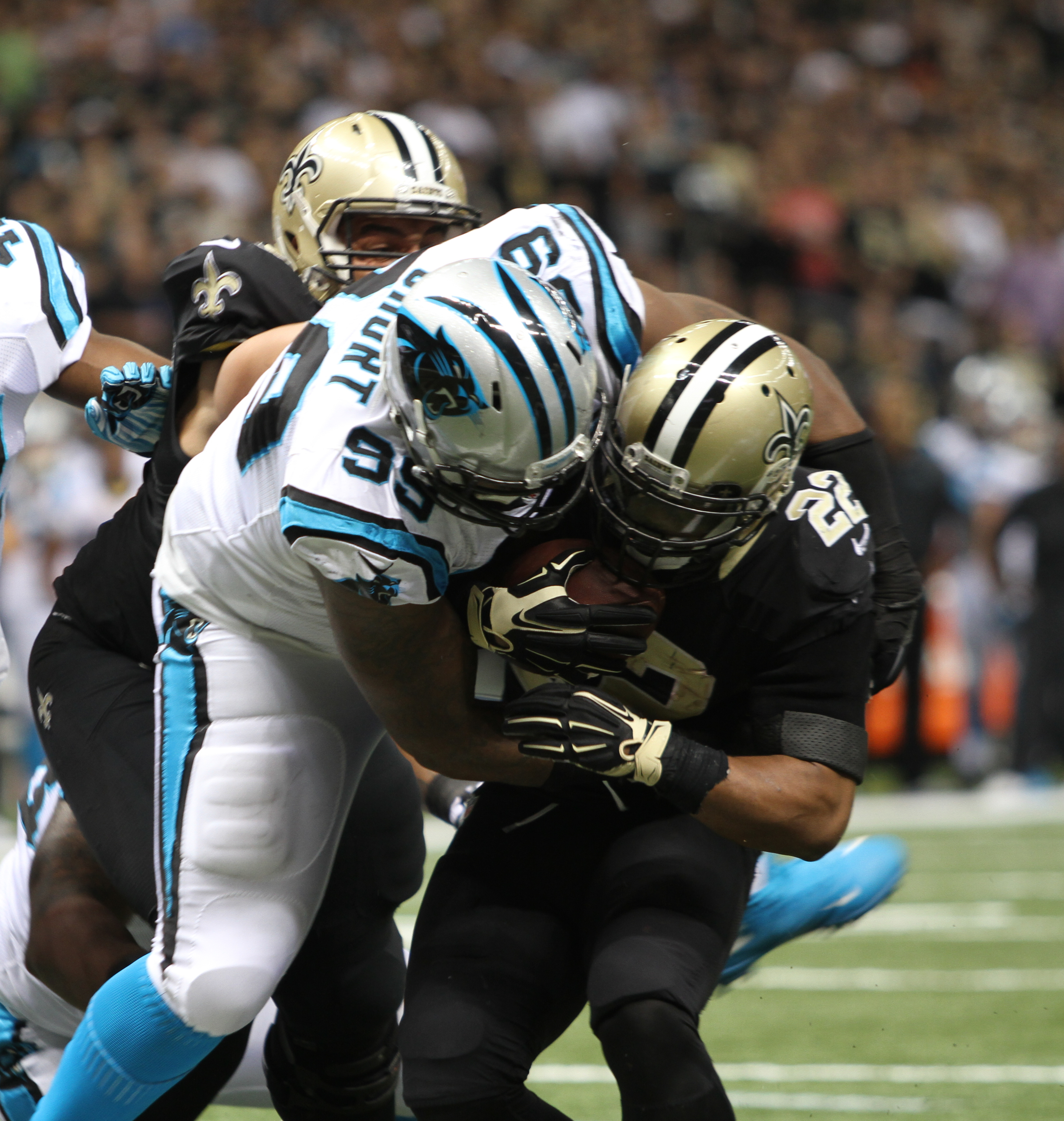
A head collision between Carolina Panthers and New Orleans Saints players during a tackle

Play-related head blows resembling concussions in American football have been shown to be the cause of chronic traumatic encephalopathy (CTE), which has led to player deaths and other debilitating symptoms after retirement, including memory loss, depression, anxiety, headaches, stress, and sleep disturbances.

The list of ex-NFL players that have either been diagnosed post-mortem with CTE or have reported symptoms of CTE continues to grow. According to Boston University, CTE is a brain degenerative disease found in athletes, military veterans, and others with a history of repetitive brain trauma. Although CTE is highly controversial and misunderstood, it is believed that tau proteins form clumps that slowly spread throughout the brain, killing brain cells.

There is also theoretical research that suggests early CTE might result from damaged blood vessels within the brain. That could trigger brain inflammation and, eventually, the development of proteins such as tau believed to play a key role in CTE. This hypothesis was tested on adult mice; the researchers state that their brains possess similar attributes to that of human brains. Using a special device, the mice were given precise impacts that would lead to mild brain traumas similar to what an athlete would suffer in contact sports. The mice, whose brains were scanned using specialized MRI, immediately showed changes to the electrical functions of their brains.

According to a 2017 study on brains of deceased gridiron football players, 99% of tested brains of NFL players, 88% of CFL players, 64% of semi-professional players, 91% of college football players, and 21% of high school football players had various stages of CTE.

Other common injuries include injuries of legs, arms, neck and lower back.

== NFL concussions ==
The National Football League (NFL) and the National Football League Players Association (NFLPA) maintain procedures for identifying, evaluating and managing suspected concussions. The protocol includes preseason education and baseline neurological assessment, evaluation of suspected injuries during games, and a staged return to participation. During games, club medical staff work with unaffiliated neurotrauma consultants and athletic trainers monitoring play from the booth. Players with suspected concussions are removed for evaluation, and a player diagnosed with a concussion may not return to play on the same day.

Return to participation proceeds through five phases, beginning with symptom-limited activity and progressing to full football activity. There is no fixed recovery timetable; progression depends on the player's clinical assessment and response to activity. Before returning to full participation, the player must receive clearance from the club physician, with that decision confirmed by an independent neurological consultant.

In January 2025, the NFL reported that recorded concussions during the 2024 preseason and regular season, including games and practices, were 17% lower than in 2023. The league described the total as its lowest since the current electronic medical record system was introduced in 2015.

The NFL and NFLPA publish helmet rankings based on laboratory tests. The Centers for Disease Control and Prevention (CDC) states that helmets can reduce the risk of serious head injury, but no helmet can prevent every concussion.

Repeated head impacts include impacts that produce concussion symptoms and those that do not. According to the CDC, chronic traumatic encephalopathy (CTE) is associated with long-term exposure to repeated head impacts, but evidence is insufficient to conclude that occasional impacts or a history of one or more concussions alone lead to the disease. The agency notes that the symptoms directly attributable to CTE remain uncertain and that confirmation of the diagnosis requires examination of the brain after death.

A 2026 observational study of 6,201 NFL players examined documented concussion history and booking-based arrests using publicly available records. Players with a documented concussion history had higher odds of arrest in unadjusted analyses, but the association was not statistically significant after excluding cases in which the earliest arrest preceded the earliest documented concussion. The association with violent arrest was also not statistically significant. The authors characterized the findings as preliminary and cautioned against interpreting them as evidence of causation.

== History ==
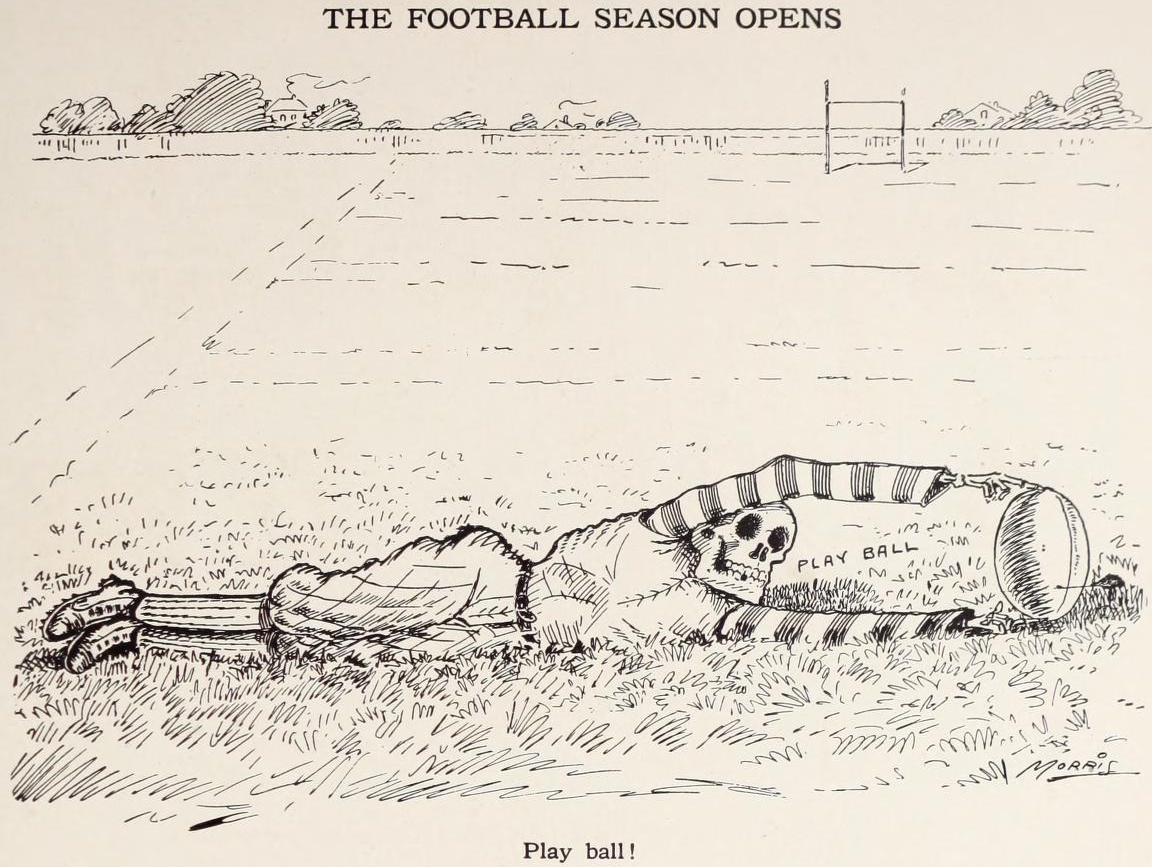
1908 cartoon (by W.C. Morris) highlighting the dangers that were associated with the sport

Concussions are frequent injuries among football players. Concussions occur when the head is subject to a large impact force, resulting in a minor brain injury. There has been a growing concern about concussions since the early 1900s. In 1906, a Harvard student-athlete died from a head injury and the team doctors released a report titled "The Physical Aspect of American Football" in the Boston Medical and Surgical Journal describing the type, severity, and number of injuries the team sustained in the 1905 season.

The NFL first began to review the subject formally in 1994, then NFL Commissioner Paul Tagliabue approved the creation of the Mild Traumatic Brain Injury (MTBI) Committee with the stated goal of studying the effects of concussions and sub-concussive injury in NFL players. Tagliabue appointed rheumatologist Elliot Pellman to chair the committee. Pellman's appointment was met with harsh criticism, because he is not a neurologist or neuropsychologist and often admitted ignorance about head injuries. The concussion data collected by the league from 1996 to 2001 has been shown to understate the actual number of diagnosed concussions by ten percent. The league additionally relied on legal counsel who were actively involved in downplaying health risks in the tobacco industry.

The same year, the National Institute for Occupational Safety and Health (NIOSH) reported a statistically significant increase in the risk of neurological disorders such as amyotrophic lateral sclerosis in retired football players, which furthered public knowledge about the risk of long-term neurocognitive disease related to repeated head impacts. Despite the NIOSH study, Pellman and the MTBI Committee drew their own conclusions that continued to contradict these findings and those of other organizations. Biomechanical engineers and neurosurgeons informed the Committee that the helmet safety standard at that time was insufficient to minimize the risk of concussions.

The MTBI Committee began studying the nature of tackle plays resulting in concussive impacts and developing its own biomechanical analysis of the effect of these forces on the brain. It started publishing study results in 2003 that stated there were no long-term negative health consequences associated with concussions sustained by NFL players. A six-year study by the Committee concluded that "Players who are concussed and return to the same game have fewer initial signs and symptoms than those removed from play. Return to play does not involve a significant risk of a second injury either in the same game or during the season."

== Research ==
Other organizations continued to publish study results that linked repeated concussions and long-term health problems contrary to reports by the MTBI Committee. A 2003 report by the Center for the Study of Retired Athletes at the University of North Carolina, for example, found a connection between numerous concussions and depression among former professional football players. Further, the center's follow-up study in 2005 associated both brain impairment and Alzheimer's disease with retired NFL players who had histories of concussions.

A 2004 doctoral dissertation by Don Brady examined NFL players' knowledge of concussions, studying both active and retired National Football League Players' knowledge of concussions. Brady's findings concluded that many NFL players lacked accurate and essential knowledge pertaining to various aspects of a concussion; that the preponderance of credible experimental and clinical evidence pertaining to the adverse effects of concussion indicates that the brain is injured as a result of a concussion; that the altered cell functioning and cell death along with subtle to more visible neurological, neurocognitive, psychological, and other medical problems reflect a diverse range of lifelong negative consequences of a concussion or brain injury; and that sports team health-care personnel need to focus primarily on the athletes' health and well-being, and not minimize an injury or primarily concentrate on the players' capacity to perform on the field. This expanded focus of health care is necessary in order to avoid any real or perceived conflicts of interest emerging in the concussion research, concussion management and related return to play decision-making process.

During November 2014, Brady filed objections to the proposed NFL concussion settlement offer. Brady sent a cover letter and detailed objections on behalf of NFL retired players to the presiding US district court judge, Anita Brody.

In addition to the studies that continued to contradict the work of the MTBI Committee, renowned experts and sports journalists wrote critical reviews of the committee's studies. Robert Cantu of the American College of Sports Medicine noted bias in the committee's extremely small sample size and held that no conclusions should be drawn from the NFL's studies. In an ESPN Magazine article titled "Doctor Yes," Peter Keating criticized Pellman and the MTBI Committee's work and argued that the "... Committee has drawn a number of important conclusions about head trauma and how to treat it that contradict the research and experiences of many other doctors who treat sports concussions, not to mention the players who have suffered them."

More studies continued to associate repetitive head injuries with neurological problems later in life. Kevin Guskiewicz, Director of the Center for the Study of Retired Athletes in the Department of Exercise and Sport Science at the University of North Carolina, analyzed data from a 2007 study of nearly 2,500 former NFL players. He found about 11 percent of the study participants suffered from clinical depression, with a threefold increased risk in former players who had a history of three or four concussions. The following year, the NFL commissioned the University of Michigan Institute for Social Research to conduct a study involving more than 1,000 former NFL players. The results reported that Alzheimer's disease or similar diseases appear to have been diagnosed in former NFL players vastly more often than in the general population at a rate of 19 times the normal rate for men ages 30 through 49. The NFL responded to these results by claiming the study was incomplete.

On September 30, 2014, researchers with Boston University announced that in autopsies of 79 brains of former NFL players, 76 had tested positive for CTE. As of January 2017, that number had grown to 90 out of 94. A study published in The Journal of the American Medical Association in July 2017 showed that 110 of 111 former NFL players whose brains were examined were found to have suffered from CTE. A 2026 study published in the British Medical Journal showed that of 338 former NFL players that donated their brains, 315 (93.2 percent) showed CTE pathology.

Later research examined the relationship between years of American football participation and CTE. A 2020 study reported that the odds of CTE doubled for every 2.6 additional years of football played, while the odds increased approximately tenfold for every 9 additional years of play.

== Helmets ==
In the article, Sports Law and Governance, it talks about how over 2,000 former NFL players are dealing with concussions later on in life. The players are complaining and the league is getting sued for how the helmets have led players to have severe lifelong brain damage. The NFL has been responding with a new "HIT" system helping players not get these problems so easily.

The Journal of Sociocultural Examinations of Sports Concussion shows significant data on concussions and . No matter what it is they are always trying to figure out a new helmet or new material to use to make it a lot safer for players if they take a lot of big blows to the head area. The article stated, "suicides of former players linked to head trauma have combined to increase the public's awareness about the potential dangers of concussions in all levels of football."

The 2024 NFL season had the fewest number of player concussions, the NFL said better helmets are a major contributor as the league had approved 12 new helmet models and advised players not to wear the helmets models that performed worse in laboratory testing.

== Prevention ==
In October 2009, NFL Commissioner Roger Goodell and the NFL Concussion Committee were called before Congress to defend their policies against allegations of neglect. Goodell provided testimony, but was unable to answer many questions. As a result of this incident and pressure from the NFL Players Association, the NFL released a comprehensive overhaul of the league concussion policy in November and December 2009. The policy expanded the list of symptoms that would prevent a player from returning to a game or practice on the same day their injury occurred.

With continued pressure to protect players, the NFL began preventing players knocked unconscious by a concussion from returning to a game or practice, a policy that applied to Detroit Lions running back Jahvid Best in 2009. Various players have filed lawsuits against the league for the concussions, accusing the league of hiding information that linked head trauma to permanent brain damage, Alzheimer's disease, and dementia. Some teams chose not to draft certain players in the NFL draft due to their past concussion history. According to an Outside the Lines report, the head impact telemetry system (HITS) was in question by the League, although Kevin Guskiewicz, a professor at the University of North Carolina, said the system is functional. The technology could detect and measure the impact of blows to the head in real time during a game, but no such measurement exists in the league at this time. Former Pittsburgh Steelers receiver and current NBC Sports analyst Hines Ward stated the use of the system would be "opening a Pandora's Box", and that the data recorded by the system could be used by team owners to give players lower salaries.

In November 2011, the Cleveland Clinic Center for Spine Health created an online study released by the Journal of Neurosurgery in which various football helmets were compared with each other via crash test dummies. It was also found that leather helmets provided similar results to modern helmets, and in some cases, the leather helmets proved to have superior protection against concussive blows. However, the leather helmets did not provide as much protection against skull fractures.

== Concussion protocol ==
When a football player sustains a concussion in the NFL, he is required to go through the concussion protocol the league has in place by the NFL Head, Neck and Spine Committee:

=== Preseason evaluation ===
Before the NFL season starts, all players and coaching staff of an organization are required to be educated on concussions and the importance of promptly reporting any concussion symptoms. All players in the league are also mandated to take a baseline neurological and physical exam. The baseline neurological exam is either a computerized or paper and pencil exam that will test different brain functions. The exam tests attention span, memory, language, speech skills, reasoning, planning, and organizational skills. The results of this test are used as a baseline if a player suffers a head injury at any point throughout the season. The preseason physical examination allows the team physician and athletic trainer the opportunity to review and answer any questions the player might have. This also gives the physician and athletic trainer the time to go over any previous concussions, discuss the importance of reporting any symptoms of a concussion, and explain the concussion protocol that is in place for the current season.

=== In-game identification ===
Current NFL concussion protocol creates positions in each organization's medical staff who are specifically charged with identifying and diagnosing concussions. One of these roles involves an unaffiliated neurotrauma consultant who works with other team physicians and athletic trainers to conduct evaluations. Another position involves athletic trainers who are positioned in the booth at every game to spot potential concussions in players from both teams. These spotters review film throughout the game that could possibly result in concussions and are capable to call "medical timeouts" to relay that information to the medical personnel on the sidelines so that further evaluation can be conducted. These spotters have been in use since the 2011 season.

=== In-game evaluation ===
If a player shows to have a concussion or concussion symptoms, it is mandatory that the individual be removed from the game. If the player is diagnosed with a concussion, they are prohibited from re-entering the game or practice that day. According to the league's protocol, signs of a concussion include: loss of consciousness, lack of balance, holding head after contact, absentmindedness, lethargy, confusion, or a visible facial injury in combination with any of the other factors. If the medical staff rule the player clear from a concussion, then the video of that hit must be reviewed before the player can re-enter the game or practice.

=== Post-game ===
After a concussion has occurred, the player must be monitored and examined on a daily basis in a training room by the team medical staff until fully cleared from concussion. Along with the continuous examination prior to a concussion, the player must meet standards put in place by the league in order to return a game or contact practice. The player may not return to football activities until he has returned to his baseline cognitive function. Next, the player must go through a graduated exercise challenge, followed by a gradual return to practice and play. If the player is feeling any setback or post-concussion symptoms, evaluation then starts from the beginning. Finally, the team doctor and an unaffiliated neurotrauma consultant must both clear him for return to play.

== NFL litigation ==
=== Denial by the League ===
The NFL spent years trying to deny and cover up any link that emerged connecting head injuries sustained while playing football with long-term brain disorders. The NFL Mild Traumatic Brain Injury (MTBI) Committee, first formed in 1994, reported in December 1999 that the number of head injuries had remained "remarkably the same over the course of four years." The committee went a step further in 2004 when it suggested in an article published in Neurosurgery that "NFL players have evolved to a state where their brains are less susceptible to injury." Two months after that, MTBI publishes another article that concludes "Players who are concussed and return to the same game have fewer initial signs and symptoms than those removed from play. Return to play does not involve a significant risk of a second injury either in the same game or during the season." However, when Dr. Bennet Omalu examined the brain of former Pittsburgh Steeler Mike Webster, he discovered a new brain disease, which he called chronic traumatic encephalopathy, or CTE. He outlined his findings in a scientific paper published in Neurosurgery in July 2005. The NFL's MTBI committee wrote in May 2006 that the article be retracted. Dr. Omalu instead wrote a second paper in the same magazine, this time about former Pittsburgh Steeler Terry Long. Dr. Ira Casson, who was then co-chair of MTBI, denied in a televised interview that there was any link between head injuries sustained playing in the NFL and long-term brain damage. His repeated denials won him the nickname "Dr. No." In September 2009, The New York Times published an article of an NFL-funded study stating that former players are 19 times more likely than the general population to have dementia, Alzheimer's or other memory-related diseases. The NFL's spokesperson, Greg Aiello, publicly said, "the study did not formally diagnose dementia, that it was subject to shortcomings of telephone surveys." Two months later, Aiello told New York Times reporter Alan Schwarz that "it's quite obvious from the medical research that's been done that concussions can lead to long-term problems." It was the first time any League official had acknowledged a link between the two.

Investigative reporters Steve Fainaru and his brother Mark Fainaru-Wada learned from an anonymous source that the NFL Retirement Board had awarded "disability payments to at least three former players after concluding that football caused their crippling brain injuries – even as the league's top medical experts for years consistently denied any link between the sport and long-term brain damage." One of the cases was that of Mike Webster, who filed a claim in 1999. In 2005, three years after his death, his family received $1.8 million from the Retirement Board. "That same year", write the Fainuru brothers, "the NFL published the 10th installment in its series on concussions research in the medical journal Neurosurgery. The paper, whose authors included three members of the League's [MTBI], asserted that chronic brain injury 'has never been reported in American football players.'"

Since Aiello's admittance, the link between head injuries in football and long-term brain damage have become more accepted in the NFL. In a roundtable discussion with the U.S. House of Representatives Committee on Energy and Commerce, Jeff Miller, the NFL's senior vice-president for health and safety, admitted that "there is a link between football-related head trauma and chronic traumatic encephalopathy." However, public relations issues continue to plague the League. A report from the Democratic members of the House Committee on Energy and Commerce said that "the NFL rescinded a gift to the National Institutes of Health (NIH) for concussion research when it learned the study's findings would be detrimental to the league's image." The NFL had tried to funnel the funds it gave to the NIH towards its own studies. The League rejected the accusations.

To mitigate the public relations (PR) nightmare, the NFL has taken several steps to better assure player safety and bring awareness to head injuries in football players of all ages. Several rule changes took place between 2007 and 2014. NFL commissioner Roger Goodell issued a memo in December 2009 to all 32 teams stating that a player who sustains a concussion cannot return to play if he shows signs or symptoms, such as inability to remember assignments or plays, a gap in memory and persistent dizziness. This move changed the 2007 rule saying a player cannot return only if he has lost consciousness. Additionally, new rules regarding "crown of the helmet" tackles have been installed where a runner or a tackler cannot initiate forcible contact with the crown of the helmet outside the tackle box so as to protect players' heads. Lastly, the NFL and USA Football launched the Heads Up Football initiative, which "emphasizes a smarter and safer way to play and teach youth football, including proper tackling and taking the head out of the game." A mobile application was also launched with help from the CDC where information about concussion protocols and player health and safety can be easily reached by parents and coaches.

The PR issues surrounding the NFL's cover-up of concussions are far from over, and it is too early to tell how and to what extent these events will impact the NFL or football playing. Robert Boland, professor of sports management at New York University and former college football player says, "In the short-run, [the NFL] is still thriving", but downward trends in youth football players shows that future generations "might have less of an intimate attachment to the sport." Boland says this in light of Pop Warner football enrollment dropping by 9.5 percent between 2010 and 2012, likely linked to the high-profile concussion problem.

=== Federal NFL concussion litigation ===
In April 2011, attorneys Sol H. Weiss and Larry E. Coben from the Philadelphia law firm of Anapol Weiss filed a federal lawsuit on behalf of Ray Easterling, Jim McMahon and five other players. Thousands of former NFL players have since filed lawsuits against the League after suffering repeated concussions throughout their careers.

The multidistrict litigation (MDL) titled In re: National Football League Players' Concussion Injury Litigation (MDL 2323) was filed on January 31, 2012, in the United States District Court for the Eastern District of Pennsylvania. Judge Anita B. Brody presides over the matter. The master administrative long-form complaint, filed by Plaintiff's Co-Lead Counsel Sol Weiss and Christopher Seeger (co-founder of the law firm Seeger Weiss) on June 7, 2012, alleges the League "... was aware of the evidence and the risks associated with repetitive traumatic brain injuries virtually at the inception, but deliberately ignored and actively concealed the information from the Plaintiffs and all others who participated in organized football at all levels." The master complaint argues the NFL knew or should have known players who sustain repetitive head injuries are at risk of suffering "... early-onset of Alzheimer's Disease, dementia, depression, deficits in cognitive functioning, reduced processing speed, attention, and reasoning, loss of memory, sleeplessness, moods swings, personality changes, and the debilitating and latent disease known as Chronic traumatic encephalopathy ('CTE')."

In April 2012, Easterling was found dead from a self-inflicted gunshot wound in his home. An autopsy report concluded Easterling's brain had evidence of CTE, a degenerative brain disease associated with frequent blows to the head.

One month later, former San Diego Chargers player Junior Seau also died of a self-inflicted gunshot wound, and a brain autopsy showed he suffered from CTE.

Like Easterling and Seau, an autopsy of Bears safety Dave Duerson's brain after he committed suicide earlier that year revealed he also suffered from the same degenerative brain disease.

The autopsy results following these players' suicides heightened existing concerns regarding the connection between player deaths and concussions. Neuropathologist Bennet Omalu has identified CTE in the autopsies of former players Mike Webster, Terry Long, Justin Strzelczyk, Andre Waters, and Chris Henry. One of the difficult issues facing doctors is attempting to identify mental health effects from concussions during the lives of former players rather than after their deaths. In April 2012, a group of former Dallas Cowboys—including Pro Football Hall of Fame inductees Randy White, Bob Lilly, and Rayfield Wright (among other retired players from around the league)—filed a lawsuit against the NFL, again accusing it of ignoring a link between concussions and brain injury.

In August 2012, the number of players involved in suits against the NFL increased to 3,402, and the League sued three dozen insurance companies in an attempt to force them to cover the costs of defending claims of not protecting players. However, Travelers ultimately sued the League on August 21 in a lawsuit called Discover Property & Casualty Co. et al. vs. National Football League et al., New York State Supreme Court, New York County, No. 652933/2012. The company provided liability coverage for the League's merchandising arm (NFL Properties), and the insurer also pointed out that the above-mentioned lawsuit has allegedly 14 counts against the League, while only two against NFL Properties.

After quarterbacks Jay Cutler, Michael Vick and Alex Smith sustained concussions in Week 10 of the 2012 season, the National Football League Players Association (NFLPA) reiterated their plans to have independent neurologists on the sidelines at every game. The 2013–14 NFL season involved an independent neurological consultant per team on the sideline of every game. Concussion guidelines released by the NFL in 2013 mandated a four-stage protocol for concussions, including examinations, treatment and monitoring prior to a return to play. In March 2013, the League proposed a rule to reduce concussions by making it illegal for a ball carrier or tackler to "initiate forcible contact by delivering a blow with the top crown of his helmet against an opponent when both players are clearly outside of the tackle box." However, the proposal was met with criticism from players like running backs Matt Forte, Emmitt Smith and Marshall Faulk.

A federal hearing was held on April 9, 2013, in Philadelphia to discuss the League's motion to dismiss the lawsuits brought on behalf of more than 4,500 former players. On July 8, 2013, Judge Brody ordered representatives of both sides of the litigation to explore a possible settlement in the litigation. Judge Brody ordered a report on or before September 3, 2013, regarding the results of the mediation.

A proposed settlement was reached in the litigation on August 29, 2013. Under the agreement, the NFL will contribute $765 million to provide medical help to more than 18,000 former players. Retired players who suffer severe neurological conditions such as Alzheimer's and amyotrophic lateral sclerosis (ALS) diseases in the future will also be eligible to apply for medical help. In addition, $10 million will fund brain injury research as well as safety and education programs.

The settlement says it should not be interpreted as a statement of legal liability on the part of the NFL.

The settlement, which is projected to protect retired players for nearly 65 years, will compensate injured former players who need immediate help and will provide baseline assessments and medical benefits to those who are symptom-free or beginning to show signs of neurological problems.

"I think it's more important that the players have finality, that they're vindicated, and that as soon as the court approves the settlement they can begin to get screening, and those that are injured can get their compensation. I think that's more important than looking at some documents," attorney Weiss said.

The settlement also allows a player diagnosed with CTE the eligibility to up to 4 million dollars in compensation. This has been met with criticism of the settlement's structure as it only applies to players diagnosed before the settlement's preliminary agreement and disallows those diagnosed after the approval of the deal in July.

Controversy continues to surround the NFL response to concussive injuries among current and former players. Although Mike Webster was the first patient to be diagnosed with CTE, posthumously, and the first diagnosed and one of the higher profile cases illuminating the issue of head trauma injuries to the NFL, his family has not received financial compensation from the NFL. The reason for this is Webster's died before January 1, 2006, and per the terms of the NFL's settlement agreement, the organization is only responsible for dispersing compensation payments to families of players who died from head related trauma and injuries from 2006 and beyond. The Webster family is currently taking legal action against the National Football League with the goal of removing that qualification from the settlement.

The NFL has paid nearly $1 billion in settlements from claims alleging long-term injuries from repeated blows to the head. Courts have examined these claims using a "Trigger" process. This trigger process includes 4 triggers: The "exposure" trigger, the "manifestation" trigger, the "injury-in-fact" trigger, and the "continuous" trigger.

The dementia tests that the NFL-approved process used came under scrutiny in 2021, as black players were assumed to have a lower baseline cognitive function than non-black players, making it more difficult to prove dementia in their case. The practice was called "race-norming" by opponents. A lawsuit attempting to overturn the practice was thrown out in March 2021 and the judge ordered the parties to resolve it via mediation. In June 2021, the NFL announced it would end the practice and would form a panel of neuropsychologists to create new, race-neutral standards.

=== Kansas City Chiefs concussion lawsuit ===
On December 3, 2013, five former NFL players filed a lawsuit against the Kansas City Chiefs organization: former Chiefs players Alexander Cooper, Leonard Griffin, Christopher Martin, Joe Phillips, and Kevin Porter. They wish to know what the Chiefs knew about concussions and when they knew it.

This lawsuit is unique and different from the thousands of lawsuits previously filed against the NFL. These players are not suing the NFL, and are instead suing the Chiefs, which is related to the 1987 NFL strike. At the end of the 1986–87 season, the 1982 collective bargaining agreement expired. Without a collective bargaining agreement, the National Football League Players Association goes on strike during the season, and furthermore decertifies as litigation occurs. Following the Reggie White lawsuit, the NFL and NFLPA agreed to a new collective bargaining agreement that began in the 1993 league year. For players who played between 1987 and 1993, however, players could sue the team for many of the same reasons the NFL has been sued. The $765 million settlement in August 2013 between the NFL and former players only protected the NFL. "I think all of our clients were disappointed," McClain said of his clients' reaction to the settlement with the NFL. The players suing the Chiefs have all opted out of the settlement from the previous mediation with the NFL.

A law unique to Missouri allows certain former NFL players to sue an individual team. The current Missouri law states that employees can sue employers in civil court if the employees declined worker's compensation. The Independence attorney for the five ex-Chiefs, Ken McClain, said, "The lawsuit is allowed in Missouri after a state workers' compensation statute was amended in 2005 to exclude cases of occupational injury that occur over an extended time."

The amendment of the 2005 law is set to be changed at the end of December 2013. Martin and McClain have both encouraged former players who are eligible to join the lawsuit before their window of opportunity expires.

On December 1, 2012, Jovan Belcher, a then-current member of the Kansas City Chiefs, shot and killed his fiancée, Kassandra Perkins, before committing suicide in the Arrowhead practice facility parking lot. On behalf of Belcher's and Perkins' daughter, lawyers have filed a wrongful death lawsuit against the Chiefs. Belcher's mother has filed a similar suit accusing the Chiefs of ignoring Belcher's cries for help as he complained of concussion-like symptoms. The first occurrence came against Jacksonville in 2009, where Belcher was knocked unconscious and failed to receive adequate treatment. The second occurrence was against the Bengals in November 2012. The lawsuits allege Belcher "suffered what should have been recognized as an acute concussion." However, one lawsuit continues, "despite exhibiting obvious symptoms, Decedent was never removed from play for evaluation and recovery." The lawsuits also claims Belcher exhibited signs of CTE, including changes in his mood and behavior.

On September 30, 2014, it was announced that the brain of former Kansas City Chiefs player Jovan Belcher contained neurofibrillary tangles of tau protein, which is associated with CTE. The tangles were distributed throughout Belcher's hippocampus, an area of the brain involved with memory, learning and emotion. If the findings of CTE come to be true, Belcher's daughter and mother are eligible for up to $4 million under the National Football League's current Collective Bargaining Agreement.

=== Riddell concussion litigation ===
On March 11, 2016, the family of deceased San Diego Charger defensive back Paul Oliver sued helmet-maker Riddell along with its related corporate entities, in the Circuit Court of Cook County, Chicago, Illinois. Shortly thereafter, Pro Football Hall of Fame running back and Super Bowl champion Paul Hornung, represented by The Brad Sohn Law Firm and Corboy & Demetrio, filed a related case against these defendants. Now, some 100 former professional players have sued Riddell in the consolidated litigation in Cook County, which alleges Riddell to have conspired with the NFL in creating false science. Riddell's attempt at the same federal labor preemption defense attempted by the NFL failed. The NFL remains subject to discovery in this case, even though it is a non-party.

== Concussions in college football ==
Self-reported concussions among NCAA student athletes
Sport	One	Multiple	None
Women's ice hockey	20.9	8.3	70.8
Men's wrestling	19.5	8.2	72.3
Men's ice hockey	18.6	7.1	74.3
American football	17.9	9.5	72.6
Men's lacrosse	17.8	7.8	74.4

The NCAA, like the NFL, has been criticized for its handling of concussions, with numerous players having retired from football due to concussions, or have filed lawsuits against the association for failing to protect student-athletes from concussions. In 2011, former players Derek Owens and Alex Rucks filed lawsuits against the association for failing to cover the players' safety. Both Owens and Rucks claimed that they had suffered brain trauma which could have been prevented. In 2012, the Southeastern Conference and Big Ten Conference began work on preventing concussions, and appointed University of Mississippi Chancellor Dan Jones to evaluate and review existing research and various diagnoses from past analyses. In 2009, an NCAA panel created and recommended a rule that prevents athletes from returning to a game after sustaining a concussion. The panel also had recommended for an athlete to be sidelined after any concussion-related injury until the athlete was cleared by a doctor. Under the new plan, all student-athletes must sign statements saying that they will report all signs and symptoms of concussions to their coaches. In addition, all athletes must have baseline cognitive testing while the post-injury cognitive testing is strongly recommended. The athletes diagnosed with concussions must be removed from sports for a minimum of one day and can only return when decided by a team physician.

There's been less focus on college players who don't go on to play professional sports, but I think you'll see that getting more attention and go down to people who play it at every level. From time to time we have all had concerns of what we ask student-athletes to do and what the long-term health may be.

— University of Mississippi Chancellor Dan Jones

== Concussions in other leagues ==
=== NCAA football ===
A prospective cohort study published in 2003 followed 2,905 collegiate football players from 25 U.S. colleges during the 1999, 2000, and 2001 football seasons, totaling 4,251 player-seasons. The study reported that 184 players sustained a concussion, representing 6.3% of the players followed, and that 12 of those players, or 6.5%, sustained a repeat concussion during the same season. Players who reported three or more previous concussions were three times more likely to sustain an incident concussion than players with no reported concussion history.

In the same study, offensive linemen, linebackers, and defensive backs accounted for the largest shares of reported incident concussions, at 20.9%, 16.3%, and 16.3%, respectively. Quarterbacks accounted for 5.6% of reported incident concussions. The authors noted that injury rates per athlete exposure suggested only a weak association between playing position and concussion likelihood.

The NCAA requires member schools to maintain concussion management plans. These plans describe when a player should be removed from practice or competition and provide guidelines for evaluation by a health care provider before return to play; NCAA guidance states that a student-athlete showing signs of concussion is not permitted to return to play on the same day as the injury.

=== Canadian Football League ===
In the 2010 season for the Canadian Football League, there have been 50 reported concussions; 44.8 percent of players reported having a concussion or concussion-like symptoms, 16.9 percent had confirmed that they had a concussion, and 69.6 percent of all players who suffered from concussions that year suffered from more than one. However, the average of 0.59 concussions per game is lower than the 0.67 recorded by the NFL in 2010. The league eventually started a concussion-awareness program with the help of Football Canada, Canadian Interuniversity Sport (CIS), the Canadian School Sport Federation, the Canadian Football League Players Association (CFLPA), the Canadian Football League Alumni Association (CFLAA), and the ThinkFirst program. The league eventually pointed out eight protocols:

- Team physicians and therapists are to use a SCAT2 (a medical protocol), to diagnose concussions and preventing athletes from playing until they have been cleared to play.
- All players are to be submitted to IMPACT, which is a form of cognitive testing, during training camp.
- All player concussion assessments in the CFL are to only be used by team physicians and therapists.
- All coaches and players will receive educational items to aid in recognizing signs of a concussion.
- Administrators are to report a change from the expectation that a player returns to the game to one that encourages players to be honest about symptoms.
- The formation of certification programs that teach coaches how to recognize the symptoms of concussions.
- The formation of training programs for coaches that emphasize that players should never use their helmets to tackle.
- A new rule in the amateur football rulebook was implemented that requires officials to report suspected concussed players to the coaching or medical staff during games.

In 2012, ThinkFirst founder and Toronto Western Hospital neurosurgeon Charles Tator led a study that was conducted by the University of Toronto, which examined the brains of 20 former players with a history of concussions, and compared them to 20 other players without a history of head injury. A separate group of 20 without football experience served as a control group. Also in 2012, the league and Tator announced a partnership to work in a study that would perform postmortem tests on former CFL players to look for signs of CTE.

=== Arena Football League ===
In the Arena Football League, despite the league's intense play, very few lawsuits have been filed for concussions. The most notable lawsuit against the league was a lawsuit filed by former Colorado Crush kicker Clay Rush in 2010, who claimed that he suffered from permanent brain damage due to repeated blows to the head during games. Like the NFL, the AFL prohibits players who suffered from concussions from practicing. In 2008, during the original league's final season, the "Shockometer" made its debut at two season-opening games (Dallas Desperados vs. Georgia Force/San Jose SaberCats vs. Chicago Rush) on 40 player helmets. The device is projected to sell for $30 if it is to become available on the market. The players that were given the device play positions that are susceptible to hard hits, such as wide receivers, defensive backs, running backs, and linebackers. AFL Players Association regional director James Guidry stated that the red light does not mean that the player has a concussion, but as a warning for team examiners to inspect the player. Guidry also said that the device could be used to prevent players who do not want to show any signs of weakness after sustaining any concussion-like symptoms from continuing to play.

What happens in a game is much different than what happens in lab situations. To be able to have a partner like the AFL that values this project as much as we do is fantastic. We can learn an awful lot and make this product as good as it can be before it's winding up on the field in widespread use.

— Dave Rossi of Schutt Sports on the Shockometer

=== Youth football ===
Youth athletes make up 70% of football players in the United States. Every year there are 23,000 nonfatal traumatic brain injuries stemming from playing football that required an emergency visit to the hospital. Of those visits, 90% of them are children between the ages of 5–18 years old.

A study conducted from 2010 to 2014 showed that of the 529 million emergency room visits; 819,000 were contact sport related. This accounted for 0.15% of all emergency visits. This number although small, may affect and cause ramifications in the American healthcare system. These figures are represented with nearly 80-90% of that of the youth population (ages 7–18).

One of the first studies of its kind was performed during the Fall 2011 football season when researchers from Virginia Tech, receiving permission from parents, placed accelerometers (which measure g forces) inside the helmets of seven youth players. These seven players were 7- and 8-year-old boys participating in a community youth league who were chosen because they were expected to have high participation and also because they wore at least a youth medium Riddell Revolution helmet (enabling the accelerometers, battery, and wireless transmitter to fit inside the helmet within the padding). That is, these seven were not a random selecting of players. Rather, the purpose of this study was to establish a baseline of what range of hits are generally expected.

As way of comparison, a collision of 80g is a big hit in a college football game of which there might be only six per game. And the range of 80, 90, or 100g is generally where risk of acute injury and concussion begins to occur (concussion being symptoms such as feeling foggy or woozy and not necessarily loss of consciousness). An example of a lesser force of 40g is heading a soccer ball, and even with blows in this 30 to 40g range, it is not known whether these pose a cumulative risk of injury.

This 2011 study measured a total 753 impacts among these seven players with a median impact of 15g. It did, however, observe 38 impacts of 40g or greater, and six impacts of greater than 80g. Fortunately, none of these youth players experienced a concussion. There is also a concern that since many young players have less developed chest and neck muscles than older players, almost every impact potentially acts likes a surprise hit.

A Virginia Tech doctor stated that reducing the number of higher hits during practice sessions constitutes a real opportunity. Of the 38 impacts of 40g or greater, 29 took place during practice. And of the six impacts greater than 80g, all took place during practice.

One Pop Warner game in particular in 2012 resulted in five concussions. In 2015, a family sued Pop Warner over the suicide of a former player who was later found to have CTE, claiming that the organization knew or should have known about the risk of head injuries. Several other lawsuits have been filed against Pop Warner for related cases.

The Center for Disease Control and Preventions (CDC's) has developed the "Heads Up concussion in Youth Sports." It helps youth coaches, players, and parents be more aware of a concussion. Heads up provides important information on preventing, recognizing and responding to a concussion. 63% of youth coaches viewed concussions being more serious, 72% said they are educating others about concussions, and 50% had learned something new.

According to the Boston University School of Medicine (BUSM), kids who begin playing football before the age of twelve are at a greater risk of depression, behavioral regulation, apathy, and executive functioning. Michael Alosco, PhD lead author for the (BUSM) states, "This study adds to growing research suggesting that incurring repeated head impacts through tackle football before the age of 12 can lead to a greater risk for short- and long-term neurological consequences".

=== Concussions in high school football ===
Concussions are frequent in high school football. Football has the highest rate of concussion among high school sports, with about 11 concussions occurring per 10,000 athletic exposures. About 50 high school or younger football players across the country were killed or sustained serious head injuries on the field since 1997.

Many concussions that occur during high school football often go untreated and are not monitored. This is a big concern because repeated trauma to the head, especially injuries with concussion like symptoms, puts a young athlete's health at serious risk. A 2013 study by Cincinnati Children's Hospital Medical Center found that, despite knowing the risk of serious injury from continuing to play with a concussion, half of high school football players would still play if they had a headache from an injury sustained on the field. Researchers surveyed 120 high school football players. Of those students, 30 reported having suffered a concussion. More than 90 percent recognized the risk of serious injury if they returned to play too quickly, but more than half of those aware of the risks responded they would "always or sometimes continue to play with a headache sustained from an injury", and only 54 percent indicated they would "always or sometimes report symptoms of a concussion to their coach." Another study found that 15.8% of football players who sustain a concussion severe enough to cause loss of consciousness return to play the same day. Due to the fact that only 42% of high schools have access to athletic training services, there has been a large debate regarding the risks that high school football players face.

Eleven high schools in North Central Florida agreed to take a written questionnaire evaluating the varsity football teams' knowledge about concussions. The study was approved by the Institutional Review Board for the Protection of Human Research Subjects by the University of Florida. The review consisted of three sections. First was to identify symptoms of a concussion, second what they believed were possible consequences from not getting the proper treatment of a concussion, and the last section was to indicate if they have ever received information about concussions. 25% of them had never received information about concussion and only 54% had talked about the issue of a concussion with a parent.

== Prevention efforts ==
Numerous efforts have attempted to identify potential concussions quickly. Helmet shock data loggers and impact sensors help monitor impacts a player receives. One example is a device created by Schutt Sports during the Arena Football League's 2008 season known as the "Shockometer"—a triangle-shaped object with adhesive on its side that sticks to players' helmets. When a player gets hit by a g-force which exceeds 98, a capsule with a green light in it will change to a red light. Doctors have determined that a g-force of approximately 100 will increase the risk of a concussion, even though a quarterback that gets sacked would normally register a g-force of 150 g. A possible flaw to the Shockometer is that fan activity could accidentally trigger the device. Riddell created the Head Impact Telemetry System (HITS) and Sideline Response System (SRS) to help record the frequency and severity of player impacts during practices and games. Every HITS helmet features MX Encoders, which would automatically record every hit. Eight NFL teams had planned to use the system in the 2010 season, but it was ultimately not used. In 2013, Reebok developed the Head Impact Indicator, which is a quarter-sized device placed on a player's skull, which activates a red/yellow light if the player is hit too hard. Similarly to Reebok's Impact Indicator, Battle Sport Science has released the Impact Indicator 2.0. The Impact Indicator 2.0 looks to increase long-term brain safety for all those who play football. On February 3, 2013, the NFL and General Electric partnered on a five-year, $50 million project to develop technology to predict brain injuries, show injury severity and the rate of recovery, and to create more protective material. There is now another company that has taken on the responsibility of attempting to limit the number of concussions in the game of football. Vicis, a Seattle-based firm, has created a new unique type of helmet that is very flexible due to the many layers that make up this new intricate helmet. This helmet consists of four layers, beginning with the Lode Shell. This layer absorbs the shock from the hit, which then leads to the Core Layer contorting and bending in all directions. This technology alleviates stress from the impact, which consists of all the linear and rotational forces involved in the hit. The Arch Shell exists directly under the Core Layer and is precisely designed to fit a player's head shape. The last layer, the Form Liner, works with the Arch Shell to apportion pressure evenly around the perimeter of the head. Instead of measuring a player's head the conventional way by taking the circumference, Vicis measures the length and width of the head to get more accurate data. A better fit of the helmet allows for the technology to work more advantageously. Several NFL players have tried this new helmet and have provided great feedback. Cliff Avril from the Seattle Seahawks said, "You don't feel the thuds as hard as they normally are." In the NFL's 2017 Helmet Laboratory Testing Performance Results, the Vicis helmet finished first out of the 33 helmets that could have been worn in 2017 NFL season. Concussion-preventing technology continues to improve the safety in the game of football.

=== NFL ===
Sean Morey, who was named cochair of the NFL Player Association's Concussion and Traumatic Brain Injury Committee in October 2009, told Brown Alumni Magazine in early 2010 that "fifty percent of concussions go unreported." Morey said that players kept their injuries secret because they felt bound by loyalty and feared job loss.

Since then, the National Football League has made numerous rule changes to reduce the number of concussions suffered by players while making the game safer.

In 2010, the NFL reworded the League's rules to prohibit a player from "launching himself off the ground and using his helmet to strike a player in a defenseless posture in the head or neck." Violations of this rule only result in the imposition of a 15-yard unnecessary roughness penalty. In the same season, the NFL mandated that once a player loses his helmet on the playing field, the current play must immediately be whistled dead.

Also in 2010, the NFL mandated that during field goals or extra point attempts, defenders must line up with their entire bodies on the outside of the snapper's body to protect the snapper while he is in a position of vulnerability. Violations of this rule, however, result in only a five-yard penalty for illegal formation.

The Competition Committee reviews all competitive aspects of the game, including playing rules, roster regulations, technology, game-day operations and player protection. The process for modifying or adopting rules and regulations is systematic and consensus-oriented.

To reinforce the seriousness of the rule changes, in the middle of the 2010 season, Commissioner Goodell issued a memo to all NFL teams stating that "more significant discipline, including suspensions, will be imposed on players that strike an opponent in the head or neck area in violation of the rules."

The most drastic step the NFL has taken to reduce head injuries was the 2010 change to the NFL kickoff rules. To reduce what has been referred to as one of the most violent plays in the game, the kickoff was moved up from the 30-yard line to the 35-yard line. The NFL also outlawed the use of the three-man wedge on kickoffs, while allowing the two-man wedge to remain a legal play. Consequently, players on the kicking team must now line up closer to midfield, reducing the amount of space the players have in which to get a running start.

In 2011, the NFL also mandated that certified athletic trainers be available in press boxes during all NFL games. These athletic trainers assist medical personnel located on the sidelines in identifying potential concussions because the symptoms are often difficult to spot and assess from the field level.

On March 20, 2013, the NFL voted to introduce yet another new rule aimed at player safety. Starting in the 2013–2014 season, if a running back lowers the crown of his helmet while he is inside the tackle box or while he is less than three yards downfield and makes contact with a defender, the team will be given a 15-yard penalty.

After three years of declines in reported cases, the 2015 regular season contained a spike in reported concussions even after making several safety improvements the previous year. The total cases reported for the practices, pre-season, and regular season was 271, a 31.6 percent spike. The 2015 cases reported for regular season games was 182, a 58.3 percent spike.

In the 2016 offseason, the NFL implemented a new policy to their concussion protocol. The NFL can now punish teams that do not follow their concussion protocol by imposing a monetary fine or taking away their draft picks. The first violation can be a fine up to $150,000 and the second violation can be a fine no less than $100,000 and a possible removal of draft picks. In 2017, the Seattle Seahawks were under much scrutiny for violating the NFL's concussion protocol by allowing Russell Wilson to return to the game against the Arizona Cardinals without the proper treatment. The Seattle Seahawks failed to have Wilson cleared by a team doctor and an independent physician before allowing him to return to the game. The NFL investigated the incident and imposed a $100,000 fine on the Seahawks.

=== WFA ===
The Women's Football Alliance has come a long way when it comes to the guidelines on making the game safer for its players.

From 2012 to 2017 they have since made it illegal to send a player back into the game with suspicions of a concussion unless cleared by a certified health official.

=== Youth football ===
Return to play guidelines (RTPs), such as Washington State's Lystedt Law, have been legally mandated since 2009. All 50 states, and Washington, D.C., have now passed legislation to help reduce the number of traumatic brain injuries in youth football.

Senator Dick Durbin, from Illinois, introduced the Protecting Student Athletes from Concussions Act on September 25, 2013, to the U.S. Senate. This act would require athletes, parents, coaches and school officials to be informed of the risks of mild traumatic brain injury (mTBI) and it would also require the "when in doubt, sit it out" policy to be used with athletes that have been suspected of having a concussion and be removed from the field of play. A press release from Senator Durbin stated that many major U.S. sports organizations, including the NFL and NHL, endorsed the bill.

In 2016, the Pop Warner league banned kickoffs in an attempt to reduce high-speed collisions that result in concussions.

== Screening procedure ==
In September 2015, researchers with the Department of Veterans Affairs and Boston University announced that they had identified CTE in 96 percent of NFL players that they had examined and in 79 percent of all football players.

As of February 2015, Gary Small and colleagues have been called into question by the FDA for their overzealous commercialization and promotion of clinically unproven screening that fellow peer researchers deem fit only for research and they have responded by withdrawing related materials from their website.

To date, all screening procedures that examine football players for brain damage have been post mortem. In 2013, Gary Small and colleagues developed an in vivo chemical tracer that can detect tau protein build up in living players. Small and his team invented this new chemical tracer, 2-(1-{6-[(2-[F-18]fluoroethyl)(methyl)amino]-2-naphthyl}ethylidene)malononitrile, or FDDNP, that could be used in Positron Emission Tomography (PET) scans. This new tracer measures for tau protein and amyloid plaque accumulation in human brains; symptoms of repetitive brain trauma among other things. Although tracers have been developed to screen for the build-up of tau proteins in the human brain, FDDNP is the first PET tracer that can be used in vivo in human trials. FDDNP was originally developed in an effort to detect Alzheimer's in elderly individuals, thus the article was published in the journal of the American Association for Geriatric Psychiatry. However, because there are similarities between Alzheimer's and the effects of Chronic Traumatic Encephelopathy (CTE), FDDNP was used to study the extent of brain trauma in consenting, retired NFL players.

Small and colleagues performed a controlled experiment on retired NFL players and an equal number of control participants. Unfortunately the sample size was very small as only 5 players of the 19 contacted were eligible for the study. Though the sample size was small, a good range of positions were represented (linebacker, quarterback, offensive lineman, defensive lineman, and a center) and all players had played in the league at least 10 years. The players had to be at least 45 years of age and currently exhibit symptoms of cognitive and mood disruption. Control participants had to meet certain criteria as well to ensure that they were as similar as possible to the NFL players in order to eliminate any biases or confounding variables. Age, Body Mass Index (BMI), years of education, and family history of dementia were all selected as the selection criteria for control participants. All participants received intravenous injections of the FDDNP tracer and were tested over 4 weeks using PET imaging technology.

The injection of the FDDNP tracer was successful, and the results of the study showed significant differences between the NFL players and control participants. The NFL players had significantly higher FDDNP signals than control participants, indicating a greater amount of tau protein accumulation. The cortical regions of all the participants studied showed no significant difference, but the NFL players had FDDNP levels that were significantly higher in the caudate, putamen, thalamus, sub thalamus, midbrain, and cerebellar white matter regions of the brain as compared to the control participants. In addition, a positive correlation was found between the number of head injuries the players sustained and the levels of FDDNP binding. This suggests that players with a more severe history of head trauma will likely have significantly more accumulation of tau protein. This, in turn, gives rise to the suggestion that a more severe history of head trauma will result in greater deterioration of the brain, cognitive functioning, and mood regulation.

The findings of the study were consistent with previous autopsy studies of individuals with CTE. The important distinction to make, however, is that the patients in Small's study were not on the slab and walked out after testing was completed. This is monumental in the field of brain trauma and concussion research.

Based on recent new blood tests; evidence is revealing no change in blood plasma tau and serum neurofilament light concentrations following sport related concussions. However these levels did rise in more severe concussion sport related injuries. This can potentially suggest that a new blood test be developed and help aid in identifying the severity of concussion, and assist in concussion protocols.

== Recovery efforts ==
Concussions are proven to cause loss of brain function. This can lead to physical and emotional symptoms such as attention disorders, depression, headaches, nausea, and amnesia. These symptoms can last for days or weeks and even after the symptoms have gone, the brain still will not be completely normal. Players with multiple concussions can have drastically worsened symptoms and exponentially increased recovery time.

Researchers at UCLA used a brain-imaging tool to identify a certain protein found in five retired NFL players. The presence and accumulation of tau proteins found in the five living players, are associated with Alzheimer's disease. Previously, this type of exam could only be performed with an autopsy. Scientists at UCLA created a chemical marker that binds to the abnormal proteins and they are able to view this with positron emission tomography (PET) scan. Researcher at UCLA, Gary Small explains, "Providing a non-invasive method for early detection is a critical first step in developing interventions to prevent symptom onset and progression in CTE".

Post-concussive symptoms (PCS) is an area of recovery that is often not discussed. New evidence suggest that new recovery protocols have been recommended and designed to more adequately and efficiently recover from concussions. PCS is a concussion symptom lasting longer than 14 days. Current protocols suggest that the athlete refrain from any physical activity until symptoms free. However, according to the Journal of Athletic Training "a physiological approach to prolonged recovery from sport-related concussion" suggests some aerobic activity may be beneficial to more appropriate healing from concussion, and may lessen the reoccurrence of repeated concussions.

There has been promising evidence that blood flow restriction based exercises can be used to improve Post-Concussion Syndrome (PCS). "The leading theory supporting this is that human growth hormone is released in response to increased lactate production from exercise, enhancing the brain function and recovery". This exercise based program could potentially be used in conjunction with aerobic therapy to better improve concussion symptoms during the recovery process.

As of 2011, all 32 NFL teams are required to have at least one Physical Therapist on staff. Physical Therapist can help with current and former NFL players that have experienced a concussion. A Vestibular Physical Therapist can create customized treatment for dizziness and balance dysfunction associated with a concussion.

== See also ==
- Chronic traumatic encephalopathy in sports
- National Football League controversies
- Steroid use in American football
- Health issues in American football
- Concussions in sport
- Concussions in Australian sport
- Helmet-to-helmet collision
- Bounty Bowl
- New Orleans Saints bounty scandal
- League of Denial
- Concussion (2015 film)
- Concussions in rugby union
- The Hit (Chuck Bednarik)
- Tua Tagovailoa concussion controversy
- List of NFL players with chronic traumatic encephalopathy
