= Mark Fainaru-Wada =

American journalist

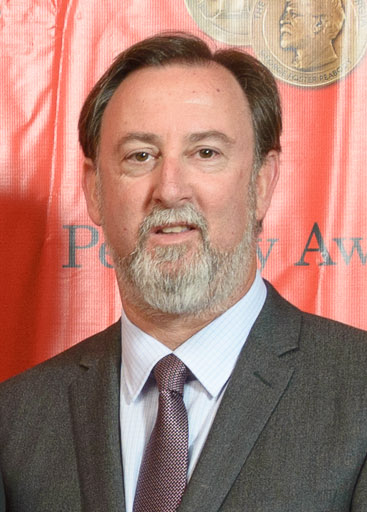
- Fainaru-Wada at the 2014 Peabody Awards
- Born: 1964 or 1965 (age 60–61)
- Writing career
- Notable works: Game of Shadows; League of Denial

Mark Fainaru-Wada is an American journalist and writer, working for ESPN since 2007. He formerly was a reporter with the San Francisco Chronicle, where he and Lance Williams achieved fame in covering the BALCO steroid scandal. He is co-author of Game of Shadows with Williams, a 2006 book about the BALCO scandal, and League of Denial, co-written with his brother Steve Fainaru, a 2013 book about traumatic brain injury in the National Football League. For his co-reporting with Williams, Fainaru-Wada received a George Polk Award, Edgar A. Poe Award, Dick Schaap Award for Outstanding Journalism and Associated Press Sports Editor Award. League of Denial earned Fainaru-Wada a 2014 PEN/ESPN Award for Literary Sports Writing, and was adapted into a Frontline documentary, which received a 2013 Peabody Award.

Fainaru-Wada was born in Los Angeles, California, and grew up in Marin County, north of San Francisco. He and his brother attended Redwood High School in Larkspur. He attended Northwestern University, graduating in 1989. He began his career at Knoxville News-Sentinel in Tennessee, covering women's basketball, and moved to the Los Angeles Daily News in 1990 to cover the Los Angeles Angels. He soon returned to the San Francisco Bay Area, writing for the short-lived National Sports Daily. When the Daily folded in 1991, he freelanced, taught high school English, and briefly worked at the Santa Rosa Press-Democrat before relocating to Washington D.C. to work for the Scripps Howard News Service He joined the San Francisco Examiner in 1997, and the Chronicle in 2000.

In 1996 he married Nicole Wada, and combined her last name with his. He resides in Petaluma, California with his wife, and has two children.
