= Steve Fainaru =

American investigative journalist and senior writer

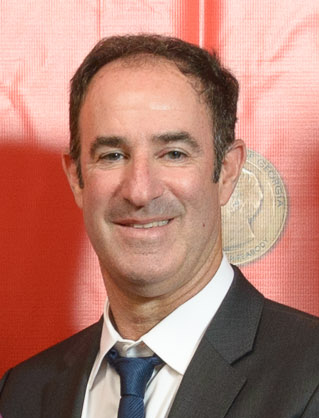
- Fainaru at the 2014 Peabody Awards
- Born: 1961 or 1962 (age 63–64)
- Writing career
- Notable awards: Pulitzer Prize for International Reporting

Steve Fainaru (born 1962) is an American investigative journalist and senior writer for ESPN.com and ESPN The Magazine. He was previously a correspondent for the Washington Post, where his coverage of the Iraq War earned him the Pulitzer Prize for International Reporting in 2008. He left the Post in 2010 and became managing editor of The Bay Citizen, a San Francisco Bay Area news organization. He co-wrote League of Denial with his brother Mark Fainaru-Wada, a book about traumatic brain injury in the National Football League, which earned Fainaru and his brother the 2014 PEN/ESPN Award for Literary Sports Writing.

Fainaru was born in Mountain View, California, and grew up in Marin County. He attended Redwood High School in Larkspur, and graduated from the University of Missouri in 1984. He returned to the Bay Area and worked for the San Jose Mercury News, then moved to the East coast, working for the Hartford Courant (Connecticut) from 1986 to 1989, then The Boston Globe, where he was named the Globe New York bureau chief. He earned a master's degree in international affairs at Columbia University in 1992. From 1995 to 1998 he was the Globe Latin American bureau chief, based in Mexico City.

== Selected publications ==
- Fainaru, Steve; Sanchez, Ray (2001). The Duke of Havana: Baseball, Cuba, and the Search for the American Dream. New York: Villard Books. ISBN 978-0812992564.
- Fainaru, Steve (2008). Big Boy Rules: America's Mercenaries Fighting in Iraq. Cambridge: Da Capo Press. ISBN 978-0306818387.
- Fainaru-Wada, Mark; Fainaru, Steve (2013). League of Denial: The NFL, Concussions, and the Battle for Truth. Three Rivers Press. ISBN 978-0770437565.
