= Ann McKee =

American neuropathologist

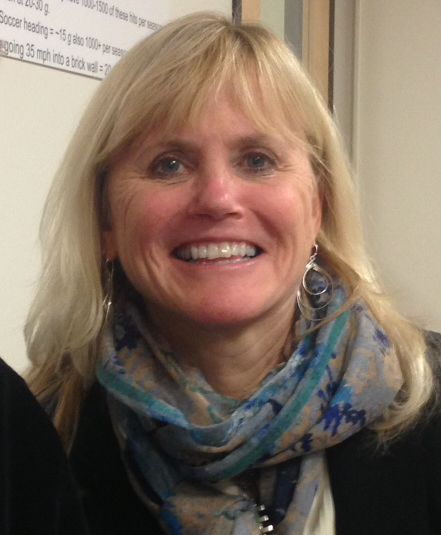
- Born: 1953 (age 72–73); Appleton, Wisconsin, U.S.
- Education: University of Wisconsin–Madison; Case Western Reserve University School of Medicine
- Known for: Study of chronic traumatic encephalopathy
- Scientific career
- Fields: Neuropathology
- Workplaces: New England Veterans Affairs Medical Centers (VISN-1); Boston University

Ann McKee (born 1953) is a neurologist and neuropathologist and expert in neurodegenerative disease at the VA Boston Veterans Affairs Medical Center and is a Warren Distinguished Professor of Neurology and Pathology at Boston University School of Medicine. She is director of the Boston University Alzheimer's Disease Research Center and Boston University CTE Center. She is particularly known for her work studying Alzheimer's disease and the consequences of repetitive traumatic brain injury. In 2017, she was named "Bostonian of the Year" by The Boston Globe for her leading work in this area, and in 2018, Time named McKee one of its 100 most influential people.

== Education ==
Dr. McKee earned her bachelor's degree at the University of Wisconsin and her medical degree at Case Western Reserve University School of Medicine. She then completed a residency in neurology at Cleveland Metropolitan General Hospital. and a fellowship in neuropathology at Massachusetts General Hospital.

== Career ==
Dr. McKee is the chief neuropathologist at VA Boston Veterans Affairs Medical Center, and Director of the Boston University Alzheimer's Disease Research Center, and the Boston University CTE Center. Dr. McKee directs multiple brain banks including those for the BU ADRC and Framingham Heart Study which are based at VA Bedford, and the UNITE brain bank based at VA Boston. Dr. McKee's research focuses on CTE and the late-effects of traumatic neurodegeneration.

Dr. McKee is a leading authority on chronic traumatic encephalopathy (CTE), a degenerative brain disease. CTE is most commonly found in athletes participating in boxing, American football, ice hockey, other contact sports, and military service. In 2013, she reported that she had found evidence of CTE in over 70 of the athletes that she examined, including three NHL enforcers and 18 NFL players. Dr. McKee has presented her findings to National Football League officials and testified before the United States House Judiciary Committee. She has also studied diseases including Lewy body disease, Parkinson's disease, progressive supranuclear palsy, multiple system atrophy, frontotemporal lobar degeneration, and corticobasal degeneration.

== Accolades and awards ==
Dr. McKee has received numerous awards in recognition of her work. In 2018, the Alzheimer's Association gave her the Henry Wisniewski Lifetime Achievement Award for her work. In the same year, Time magazine named her one of the 100 Most Influential People. Chris Borland, a former linebacker for the San Francisco 49ers who retired at the age of 24 due to brain injury concerns spurred by Dr. McKee's research, said "She may have saved my life. At the very least, her work has likely spared me much of the suffering we see today among former NFL players." She also earned the Paul Volker Career Achievement Medal in 2019 for her advancements in head trauma work.

== Personal life ==
Dr. McKee is married, has three children and 3 grandchildren, and lives in Massachusetts. She is a Green Bay Packers fan.
