= Combimac =

Dutch Company

COMBIMAC
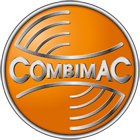
- Type: Limited liability company
- Predecessor: Pelger
- Founded: 1 November 1919
- Founder: Willem D. Pelger
- Headquarters: Emmen, Netherlands
- Area served: Worldwide
- Products: Special electric motors and centrifugal fans
- Number of employees: (50)
- Website: http://www.combimac.com

COMBIMAC is a manufacturer of special electric motors and centrifugal fans located in Emmen, Netherlands.

== History ==
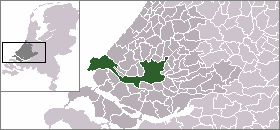
Rotterdam region

=== Pelger ===
The company was originally founded on 1 November 1919 as Pelger in Rotterdam in the Netherlands by Mr. Willem D. Pelger, with a funding capital of 40 Dutch guilders. The company started at the Zwanesteeg 4 in Rotterdam as a direct current electric motor repair shop. In 1920, the first employee was hired. Direct current motors were in use in Rotterdam, since direct current was used instead of alternating current in the early days of the electric grid. In March 1926, the company moved to the Paardenstraat 5 and in May 1929, they moved on to the Van Speykstraat 86–102 in Rotterdam. In 1935, by coincidence, contact was established between Mr. G. Ph. van Gelder, a general representative for a manufacturer of blacksmith fans based in Musselkanaal, and Mr. Pelger. The company was not performing well and was in deep financial trouble. After contact was made, the company was bought, and the inventory and 5 employees moved to Rotterdam.

In 1936, a centrifugal fan, brake motors and small induction motors program from another manufacturer named HSM (Heinke-Schuitema-Musselkanaal) based in Musselkanaal was bought and brought to Rotterdam. Mr. K.W. Heinke, one of the former owners and mechanical engineer of HSM, also moved to work at the factory in Rotterdam. In the same year, 40 patents were applied for, relating to three inventions: the centrifugal switch, the centrifugal fan housing and the principle of a squirrel-cage rotor. The Pelger repair shop gradually evolved into a factory for designing and manufacturing special electric motors and centrifugal fans. After some time, the two original company names, Pelger and HSM, were combines into Holland Special Machines Pelger or HSM-Pelger.

=== Heinke & Schuitema Musselkanaal ===
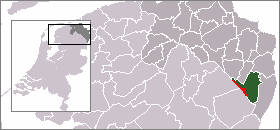
Musselkanaal region

The company Heinke en Schuitema Musselkanaal (HSM) was founded on 1 March 1933 by Mr. Konrad W. Heinke and Mr. Etsko Schuitema in order to manufacture and repair electric machines. After HSM was bought and moved to Rotterdam, Mr. Schuitema continued to work independently as E. Schuitema, Repair Company for Electrical Machines until his death in 1947. Mr. Heinke kept all rights to the casting patterns, which are held by: N.V. Asselbergs' IJzerindustrie en Handelsmaatschappij IJzergieterijen, N.V. Nederlandsche IJzergieterij Vulcanus and N.V. Twentsche Metaal- en IJzergieterij. In 1936, the manufacturing and series production at the Pelger factory started. Mr. Heinke initiated further development and introduction of new models. Mr. van Gelder kept the sole distribution rights for the products. The sales and distribution of the products stayed with Mr. van Gelder's company, Firma G. Ph. van Gelder, in Overschie, until World War II.

=== World War II ===
At the beginning of World War II, the company had a narrow escape during the Rotterdam Blitz, or bombing of Rotterdam. The edge of the burned down zone came very close to the factory, located at the Van Speykstraat 102. During World War II, under the occupation of the German Regime, the factory continued to work almost up to the end of the war. Mr. van Gelder was forced to disappear and go into hiding. Furthermore, the trading name Firma G.Ph. van Gelder could no longer be used and was replaced by Handelsonderneming H.S.M.-HOLLAND. In 1941, the factory was declared an enemy of the Germany Regime and, in 1943, the factory was forced to work for the German industry. The company Elin Schorch Reydt (the so-called Patenschaft) ordered the manufacture of refrigerator motors for the company Alfred Teves. The production of the motors was sabotaged by the employees and management, endangering their own lives.

On 1st 1944, the 25th anniversary of the company was celebrated by a small group. A few days later, during the Rotterdam Razzia (or Roundup), on 6 November 1944, all the raw materials were collected from the factory and, on 10 November, all the machinery was collected and transported to Germany. Mr. Heinke, who had German roots and NSDAP sympathies, had gained the title of Rüstung-Inspektor der Rüstung und Kriegsprodukten in the Netherlands and assisted the transport. Mr. Heinke wanted to continue the development of the repulsion motor, for which a patent was pending for his own account. Mr. J. Vos, an employee of the company and head of the test laboratory, was put to work as a forced laborer in Zwickau.

After the war, Mr. Vos managed to find the machinery taken from the Pelger factory, as he stayed in contact with Mr. Heinke. He found the machinery stored at the Tischlerei Max Siegert in Frankhausen, Mr. Heinke's former home. The machinery was in the possession of Mr. Heinke's widow, as Mr. K.W. Heinke died shortly after the war. The machinery was officially confiscated by the American Occupation Authorities in Crimmitschau and was brought back to the Netherlands.

After World War II, a new sales organization was set up: Van Gelder & Pelger. On 9 June 1950, the company Pelger N.V. was founded with a funding capital of 500.000 Dutch guilders. In 1951, it was decided that the sales and distribution of the produced goods would be done by the company Pelger itself, through a separate sales office located at the Groenendaal 25 in Rotterdam.

=== Move to Emmen ===
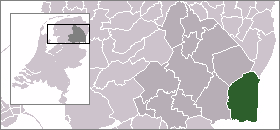
Emmen region

After moving to larger facilities within Rotterdam a few times, in 1957, the factory moved from the city of Rotterdam to the town of Emmen. The factory location at the Van Speykstraat 102 in Rotterdam became too small and was located too near to the city center. The subsidy in the Emmen region aimed at attracting new businesses and industries, the availability of land on a new developed industrial estate, and the high unemployment in this region initiated this move The available workers, although often poorly technically educated, could be transformed into well skilled employees with the help of local technical schools and the company's own internal technical education. In the years to follow, management was transferred to the sons of Mr. J.W. Pelger. Mr. K.D. Pelger became technical director of the factory in Emmen. Mr. W.C. Pelger became sales director of the Rotterdam sales office, which stayed in Rotterdam until 1971. The company grew to 130 full time employees in Emmen and 10 full-time employees in Rotterdam. In 1969, the company was taken over by Mr. L Bood. Both Mr. K.D. Pelger and Mr. W.C. Pelger stayed on the board of directors as purchase director and sales director respectively.

=== Strike ===
In 1972, a dispute arose between the Mr. L. Bood, the managing director, and an employee, Mr. A. Platje, member of the Dutch communist party, about rights and obligations under labour law. The unions got involved and strikes were initiated. The dispute ended up being the longest strike in the electrotechnical industry in the Netherlands, lasting for almost half a year, and several court cases were held. The Dutch Union NVV (Nederlands Verbond van Vakverenigingen), whose chairman Arie Groenevelt averred that "[they] will strike until the company ceases," was not willing to amend their demands and as a result the company went into receivership. This ended the Pelger era and 102 emoloyees lost their jobs. The company received national notoriety, due to all the publicity. To continue the employment of the workers, a foundation was founded, named Stichting voor behoud van Werkgelegenheid: Combinatie Machines Apparaten en Constructies, or COMBIMAC for short. :he foundations committee was made up of r. P.J.S. de Jong, former Prime Minister of the Netherlands and Minister of Defense., r. A. Jellesma, director of company W. Hubert & Co. in Sneek, and Mr. W. de Vries, director of company Hydro-Holland in Meppel. The company continued with 35 Femployees

=== COMBIMAC ===
In 1976, Mr. P.W. Glasmacher, working as a vice director at that time, took over the foundation and transformed it back into a company: Machine- en Apparatenfabriek Combimac B.V. In 1993, Mr. H.J. Robben and Mr. M.J.T. de Zwart, by means of a management buyout, took over the company.

== Products ==
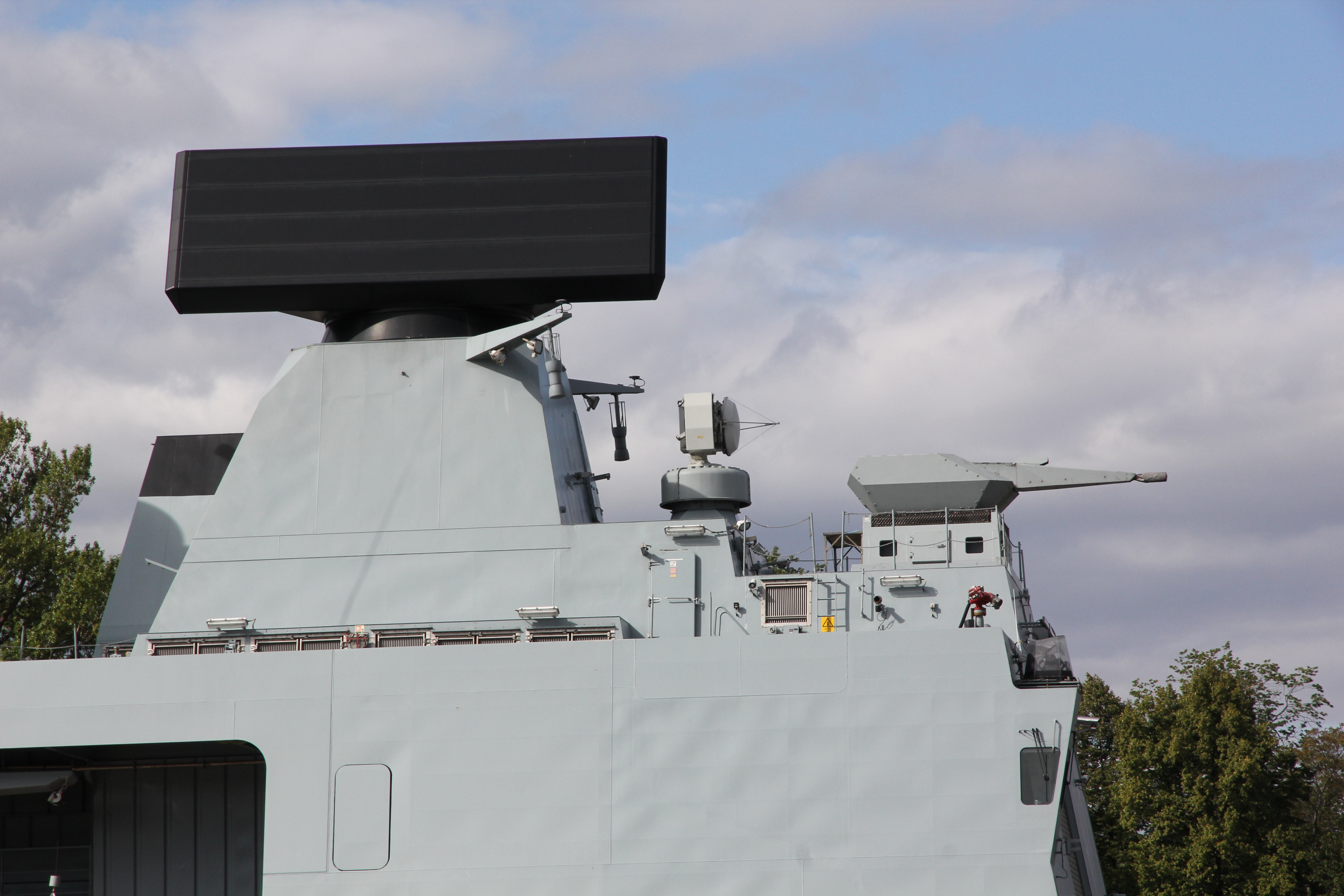
SMART-L radar driven by electric motors

=== Electric motors ===
==== Naval ships ====
The company started in 1919 as a repair shop for direct current machines and transformed over time into a designer and manufacturer of special electric motors. These electric motors are designed to drive and rotate all kinds of equipment, including pumps, compressors, winches, thrusters and radar systems, such as the SMART-L. Throughout the company's history, the development of dedicated electric motors on board naval vessels became more prominent. The first motors supplied were shock-resistant, low magnetic, direct current motors, sold in the 1950s for the Dutch Dokkum-class minehunters. Direct current motors have been replaced by alternating current motors for usage on board of MCMV's (mine counter measures vessels) or Minehunters and Minesweepers. Two different types of motors are used: low magnetic and low magnetic strayfield compensated. The latter is a low magnetic electric motor provided with compensating coils, which reduce the emanating magnetic fields, providing a reduced magnetic and acoustic signature, to avoid sea mines being magnetically or acoustically activated. The development of shock proof electric low noise motors started in the 1960s, for usage on board the Dutch Dolfijn class submarines.

==== Tanks ====
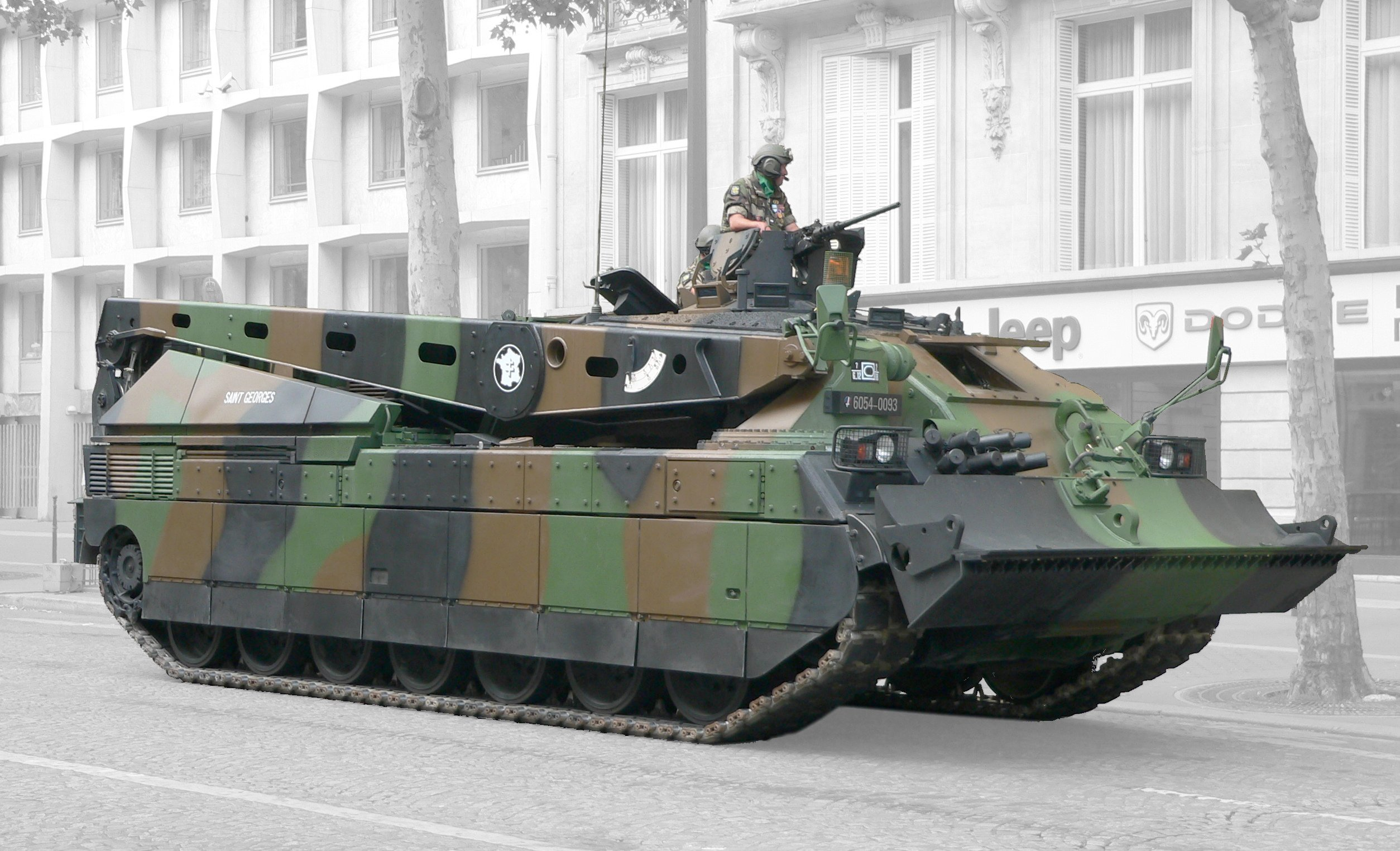
Leclerc recovery tank

In the 1970s, contact was made with the German company AEG in Hamburg and Essen. This company was a major sub-supplier to the German company Krauss-Maffei AG (now known as Krauss-Maffei Wegmann), designer of the Leopard 2 battle tanks. As a result of the Dutch army's procurement of this tank and the industrial compensation obligations, Combimac became co-manufacturer of the company AEG and supplied several electric motors for specific drives during the 1980s. In the same period, NBC electric fan units had been developed for the French company Éstablissements Neu (currently Howden) in Lille, for use on board the French AMX30 battle tanks. At the beginning of the 21st century, contact was made with the French company GIAT (currently Nexter Systems), designer of the Leclerc battle tank. Two types of electric fan units were developed for NBC (Nuclear, Bacterial and Chemical) air filter systems.

==== Luxury yachts ====
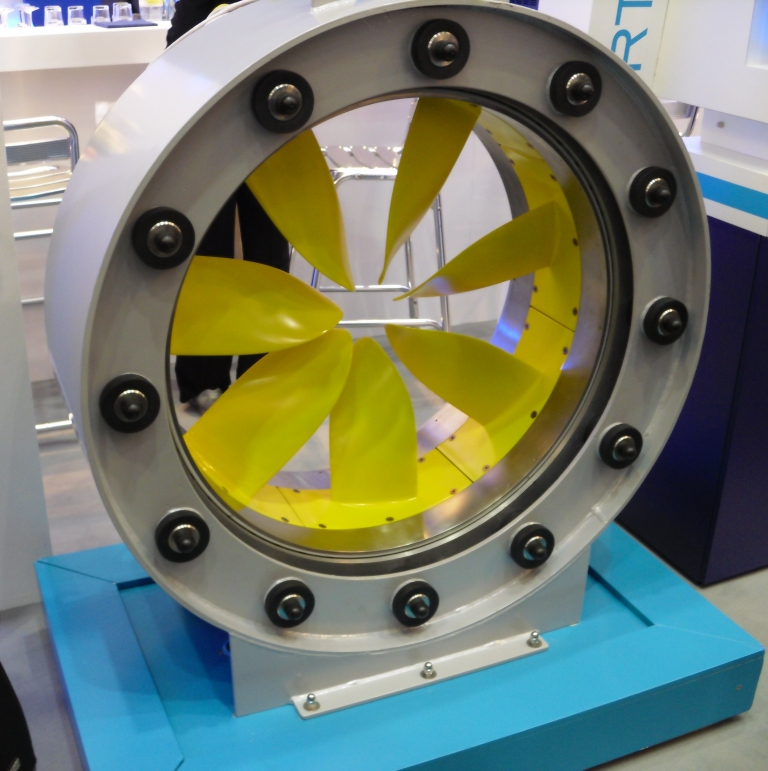
Rime Thruster Drive

In 2005, the development of rim drive thruster motors was initiated. The revolutionary compact lateral thruster was developed by two separate partnerships: Rolls-Royce with Smartmotor from Trondheim and Van der Velden® Marine Systems with Combimac. The electrical permanent magnet motor has the form of a thin ring. Its stator is incorporated in the tunnel and its rotor carries propeller blades. Waterflow through the unit is unobstructed since there is no gearbox in the tunnel and no struts are needed to support a hub. Together, these factors provide a high total efficiency and reduced noise and vibration, as there is no cavitation due to the low tip speed of the propeller blades. The prototype was successfully tested at the MARIN (Maritime Research Institute Netherlands). The patented thruster design has won two innovation design prizes. The permanent magnet motor technology was also implemented for the development of motors and generators in hybrid drive systems on board super yachts

=== Centrifugal fans ===
The original centrifugal fan designs were bought from HSM (Heinke-Schuitema-Musselkanaal), located in the town of Musselkanaal, in 1936. Throughout the history of the company, the manufacture of centrifugal fans has been extended to various models, including ATEX fans for use in hazardous environments. ATEX centrifugal fan units are built in accordance with the European directive 2014/34/EU (previously 94/9/EG). ATEX centrifugal fan units are widely used in the biogas industry to provide combustion engine gas with ample pressure, and are suitable for usage in Zone 1 and 2.

=== Pumps ===
The manufacture of electrical driven submersible pumps was begun during the 1960s. The company predominately produced submersible pumps for sewage treatment plants and building constructions sites. The manufacture of pumps continued until the 1990s, as demand for these specific pumps waned.

== Users ==
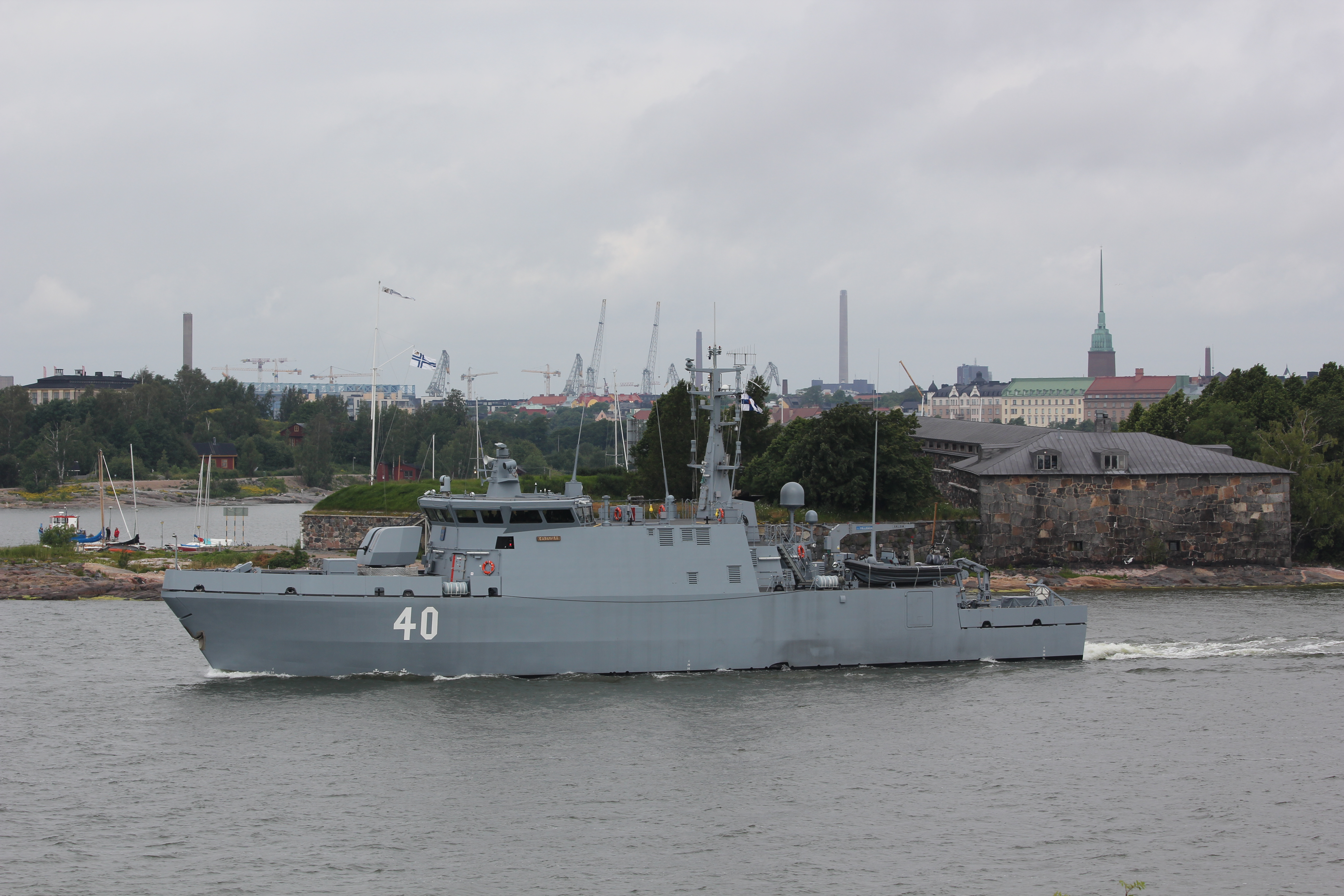
Minehunter

=== Mine Counter Measures Vessels ===
- Lerici class minehunter
- Tripartite class minehunter
- Oksøy class mine hunter
- Huon class minehunter
- Sandown class minehunter
- Kormoran 2 class minehunter
- Katanpää class mine countermeasure vessel
- Bedok class mine countermeasures vessel
- Styrsö class mine countermeasures vessel
- ''Segura'' class minehunter
- A-class mine countermeasures vessel
- List of minesweeper classes

=== Submarines ===
- Walrus class
- Swiftsure class
- Trafalgar class
- Vanguard class
- Dreadnought class
- Astute class
- Barracuda class
- S-80 class
- Type 209 submarine
- Type 214 submarine
- Type 218 submarine
- Jangbogo III submarine

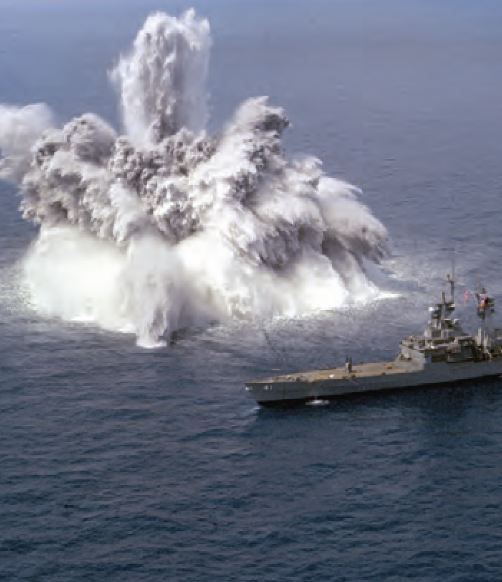
Shock testing on a naval vessel

== ATEX see also ==
- Electrical equipment in hazardous areas
- ATEX directive
- ATEX guidelines
