= Hillbilly Herald =

American rock and roll band

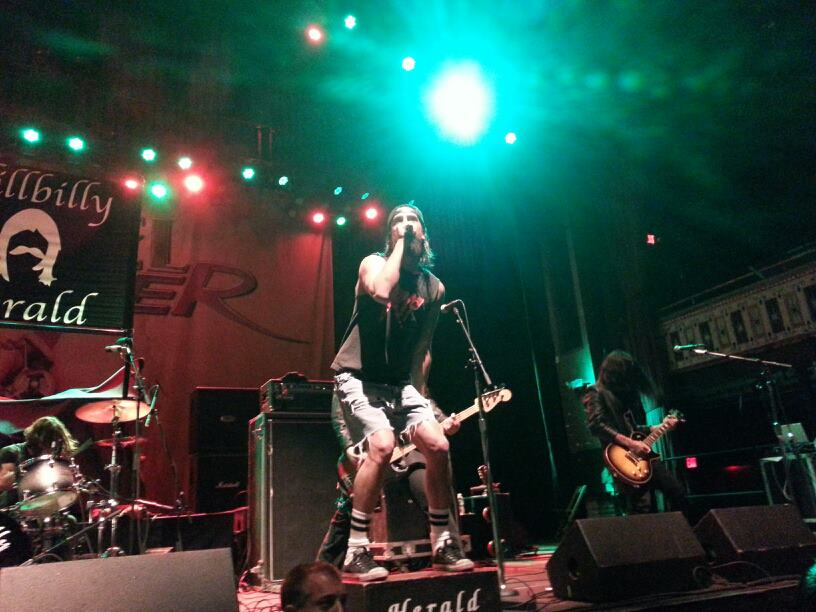
- Hillbilly Herald live at the Tabernacle in Atlanta, Georgia, April 14, 2013

Background information
- Origin: Los Angeles, California, USA
- Genres: Hard rock, blues rock
- Years active: 2008–present
- Members: Jimmy Herald; Ronnie "Elvis" James; Barry Pointer; Robo Hryn; Louis "Seabiscuit" Riel
- Past members: Adam Wolf; Brian Ceballos; Mark Hill; Kevin Kapler; Daryl Anderson
- Website: www.hillbillyherald.com

Hillbilly Herald is an American rock and roll band that formed in Los Angeles, California, in 2008. The band has toured North America several times, including as the opening act for Slash, and has been recognized for its gritty and boisterous live show.

== History ==
Hillbilly Herald was founded by lead singer Jimmy Herald at the advisement of Guns N' Roses guitarist Slash, who told Herald he should start a band. Shortly after Herald moved to Los Angeles in 2008, he started playing music with guitarist Mark Hill, a former coworker at a car wash in Austin, Texas. They recorded their first demo together, and Adam Wolf was hired to play bass shortly thereafter. Herald named the band Hillbilly Herald as a tribute to his family, which hailed from West Virginia and later moved to Elkhart, Indiana, where he was born.

Among the band's musical influences are Guns N' Roses, Aerosmith, AC/DC, Lynyrd Skynyrd and Bob Seger. The band has been recognized for its loud, high energy stage show and musically tight performances. The band is also known for Herald's mic stand made of beer cans.

In 2009, the band signed to an indie label and released its self-titled debut album in June 2009. Tommy Clufetos, who has played drums for Ozzy Osbourne, Ted Nugent, Alice Cooper, Rob Zombie, and Black Sabbath, performed drum tracks on the record. Producer and engineer Bryan Carlstrom (Alice in Chains, Rob Zombie, The Offspring, Social Distortion) recorded and mixed the record. For the band’s 2009 tour to promote the album, drummer Kevin Kapler was added to the lineup.

In 2010, the band recorded the single "Greedy Me" with engineer Chris Baseford at The Atrium Studios, which is housed on the first floor of Mötley Crüe drummer Tommy Lee's Los Angeles residence. The song was released alongside the official Hillbilly Herald video game.

In February 2013, the band released a 5-song EP entitled Sunday's Best. The EP also came with a live DVD of one of their performances while on Slash's Apocalyptic Love tour.

The band has toured North America, both as headliner and as support for major recording artists, including Slash. In 2013, the band toured the United States and Canada, opening for Steel Panther.

== Line-up ==
=== Current members ===
- Jimmy Herald - lead vocals, harmonica
- Ronnie "Elvis" James - bass guitar, backing vocals
- Barry Pointer - rhythm and lead guitars, backing vocals
- Robo Hryn - lead and rhythm guitars
- Mark Halfon - drums

=== Former Members ===
- Adam Wolf - bass guitar, backing vocals
- Louie Riel - drums
- Tommy Peacock - guitar, backing vocals
- Benjamin Leroy - guitar, backing vocals
- Brian Ceballos - guitar
- Mark Hill - guitar
- Kevin Kapler - drums
- Daryl Anderson - drums
- Gary Martin - guitar, backing vocals

=== Temporary Stand-Ins ===
- Ronnie Elvis James - bass
- Omar Gusmao - guitar

== Discography ==
=== Albums ===
- Hillbilly Herald (2009)

=== EPs ===
- Sunday’s Best (2013)

=== Singles ===
- “Greedy Me” (2010)
- “Shame on Me” (2013)
