= Low magnetic electric motor =

AC or DC motor with reduced magnetic stray field signature

A low magnetic electric motor (or non magnetic electric motor) is an AC or DC motor with a reduced magnetic stray field signature.

== Description ==
Different type of naval mines

Low magnetic or nonmagnetic electric motors are used on board mine countermeasures vessels, minehunters, minesweepers and specific types of submarines. For about a hundred years sea mines or naval mines have been an established element in naval warfare. Modern naval mines nowadays react on magnetic, acoustic and pressure signals. By far the most important step in their development was the invention of the magnetic influence firing principle, which utilizes the magnetic interference field of passing ships. Naval mines with magnetic fuzes are effective, inexpensive and easy to deploy. An electric motor produces two types of magnetic fields: a dynamic alternating stray field, whilst running and a static remnant or residual magnetic during standstill. To avoid detection it is necessary to reduce these signatures at the source as much as possible.

== Signature ==
Magnetic fields

Electric motors generate internal magnetic fields to rotate the rotor in the stator. A significant part of these magnetic stray fields emanate to the outside of the electric motor housing and can be measured and/or detected. During running, an electric motor also produce airborne and structure borne noise. The primary goal to avoid detection is to reduce these signatures as much as possible and to operate in stealth mode. The measurements of ships' signature as a whole are usually performed at a magnetic ranging facility.

=== Low magnetic ===
Low magnetic motors or nonmagnetic electric motors are designed to provide a reduced emanating magnetic stray field signature. These electric motors are manufactured from as little magnetic material as possible. The parts and components used to manufacture these electric motors are selected from materials with a low magnetic permeability. There are three major means of reducing the emanating magnetic stray fields of an electric motor: a dedicated electric and magnetic layout, electromagnetic shielding and additional compensating coils. Reduction and ways to achieve this are described in the American standard DOD-STD-2146, the British Defence-Standard 02-717 and the German Standard BV3013. Further reduction to the electric motors' magnetic signature, as well as the reduction of the ships' magnetic signature can be obtained by additional degaussing coils.

=== Airborne Noise ===
The primary source of airborne noise from an electric motor is the cooling fan to provide air to the electric motor. Reduction of air borne noise can be achieved by reducing the cooling air speed. An alternative is to use water or oil cooled electric motors. Air borne noise levels for different type of equipment on board Navy Vessels are laid down in the American military standard MIL-STD-1474D, the British Defence Standard 02-813 or the Indian Naval Engineering Standard NES 847.

=== Structure Borne Noise ===
Structure borne noise in an electric motor is the result of roller bearing inaccuracies, rotor bar pass frequencies, magnetic unbalance, non-matching rotor and stator slot combinations, which generate acoustic signals. Reducing structure borne noise can be done by various means. A correct rotor/stator slot combination, selected precision roller bearings, reduced magnetic saturation in the stator can help to reduce the structure borne noise levels. Methods of measurements and acceptance criteria are defined in the American military MIL-STD-740-2(SH) and the British Defence Standard 02-813

=== Vibration (internally exited) ===
Mechanical unbalance of the rotor will generate vibration. The vibration will result in structure borne noise, as well as unwanted acceleration forces or resonance, which eventually will harm or damage parts of the electric motor. To reduce the unbalance forces, precision balancing, as described in the American military standard MIL-STD-167-1A, type I (internally exited) will be necessary.

=== Vibration (externally exited) ===
Electric motors on board naval vessel may experience shock and vibration. A dedicated rigid design will allow electric motors to withstand these environmental impacts and provide sufficient active hardening. Passive hardening is done by installation of shock and vibration mounts onto the motor and/or system. Test method and limits are described in the American standard MIL-STD-167-1A, type II (environmental).

=== Shock ===
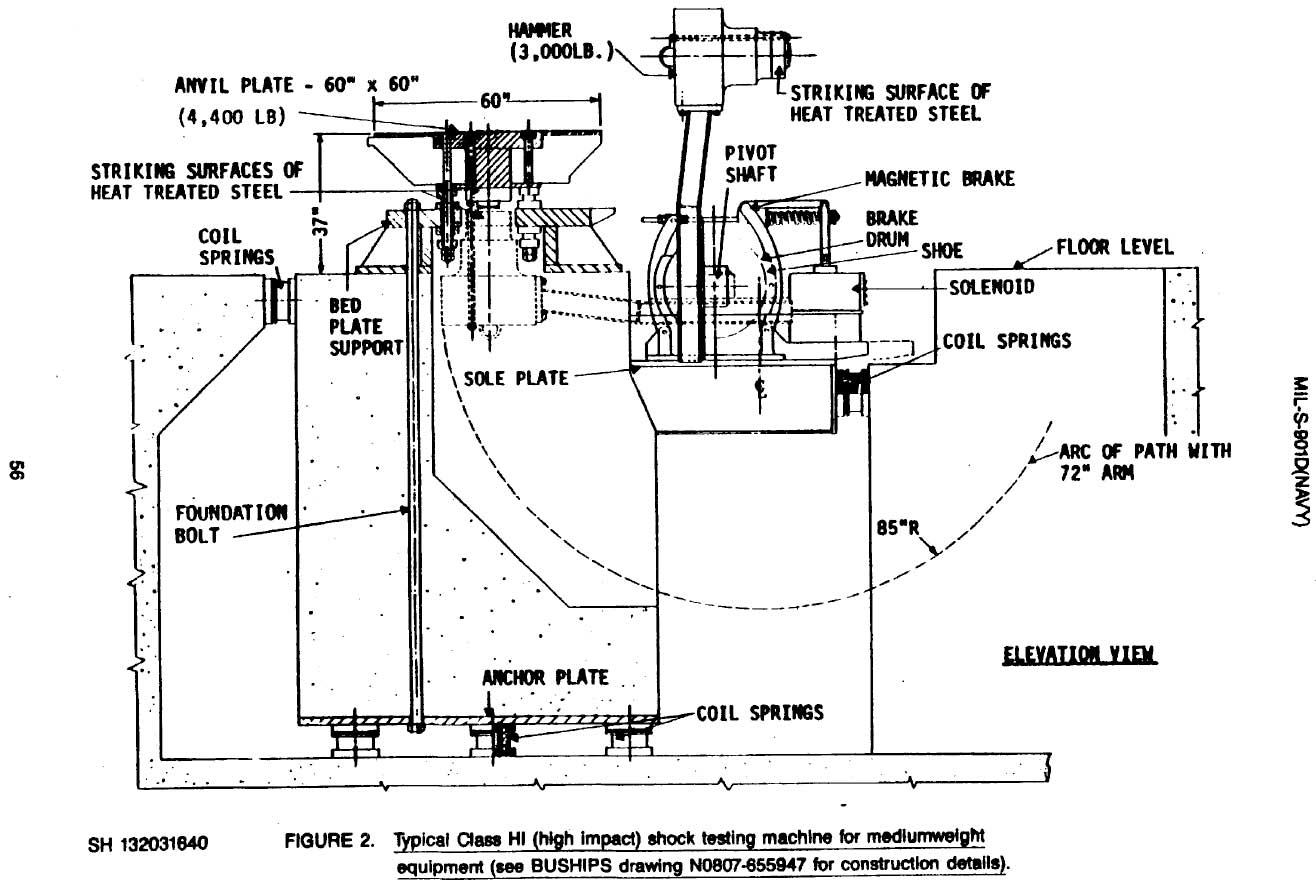
Shock test machine

Due to the nature of naval applications, equipment on board of mine countermeasures vessels and submarines may be subject to underwater explosions. Therefore, low magnetic electric motors need to be shock proof or shock resistant. Naval shock requirements on ships are specified in standards, such as the American standard NAVSEA-908-LP-000-3010 (Rev 1). Equipment on board of naval vessels is specified in different standards, such as the American military standard MIL-S-901D, the British and Indian naval standard BR3021 or the German standard BV 0230. A large part of the environmental tests and measurements are stipulated in the American standard MIL-STD-810. Shock testing on equipment is performed by specialist institutes, such as TNO, NTS Navy, Thales-ECC or QinitiQ.

== Users ==
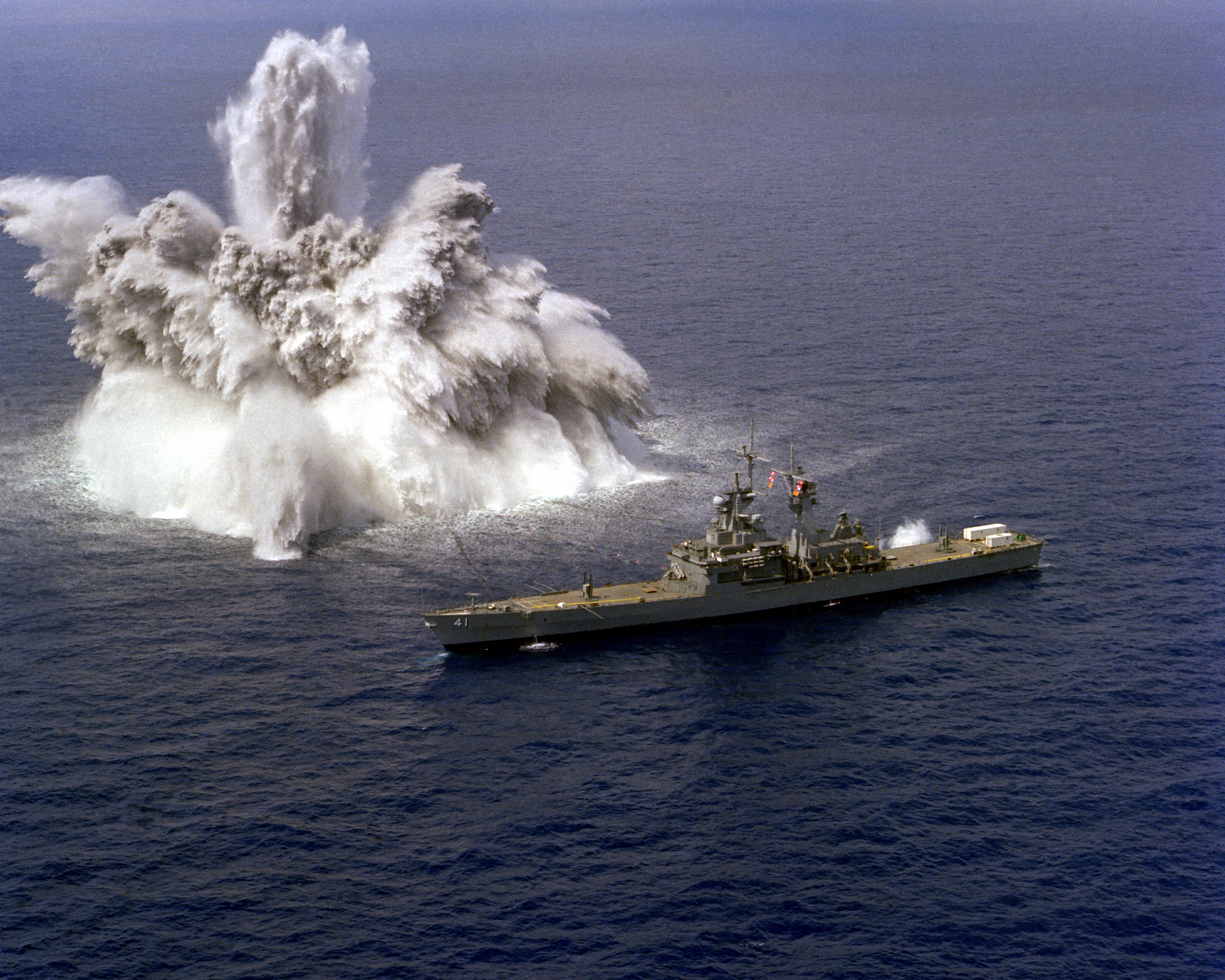
Shock impact on a naval vessel

- Osprey-class minehunter
- Tripartite-class minehunter
- Huon-class minehunter
- Oksøy-class minehunter
- Alta-class minesweeper
- Sandown-class minehunter
- Lerici-class minehunter
- Katanpää-class minehunter
- Kormoran 2-class minehunter
- Visby-class korvette
