= Shock mount =

Device used for vibration isolation

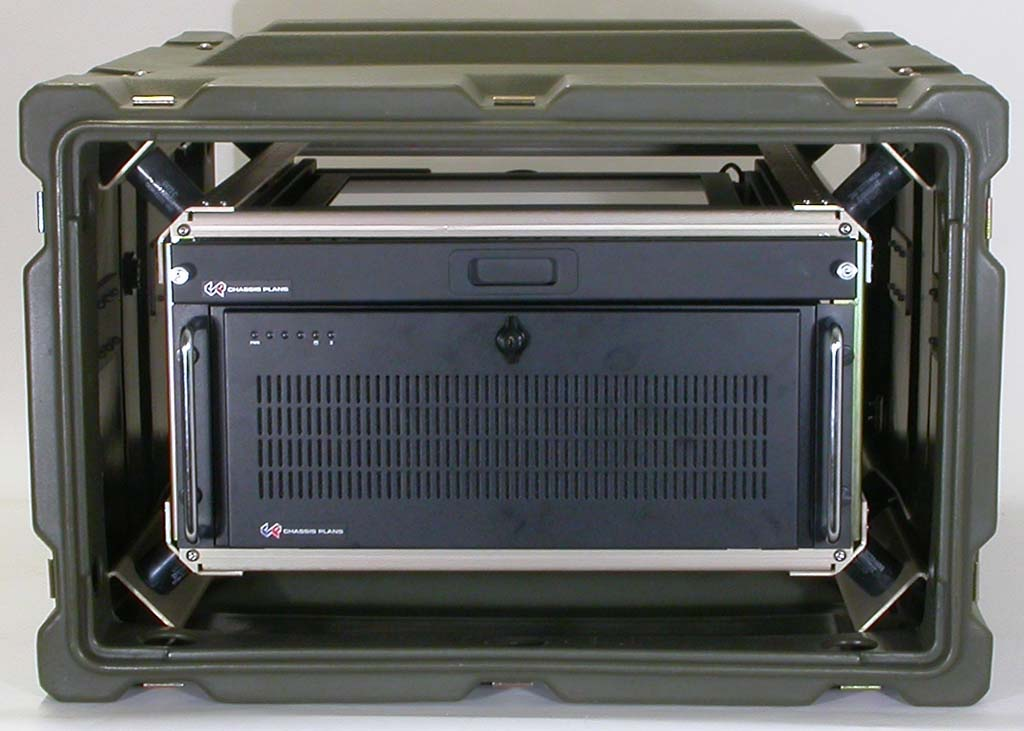
Transit case showing internal shock mounting

A shock mount or isolation mount is a mechanical fastener that connects two parts elastically to provide shock and vibration isolation.

Isolation mounts allow equipment to be securely mounted to a foundation and/or frame and, at the same time, allow it to float independently from it.

== Uses ==
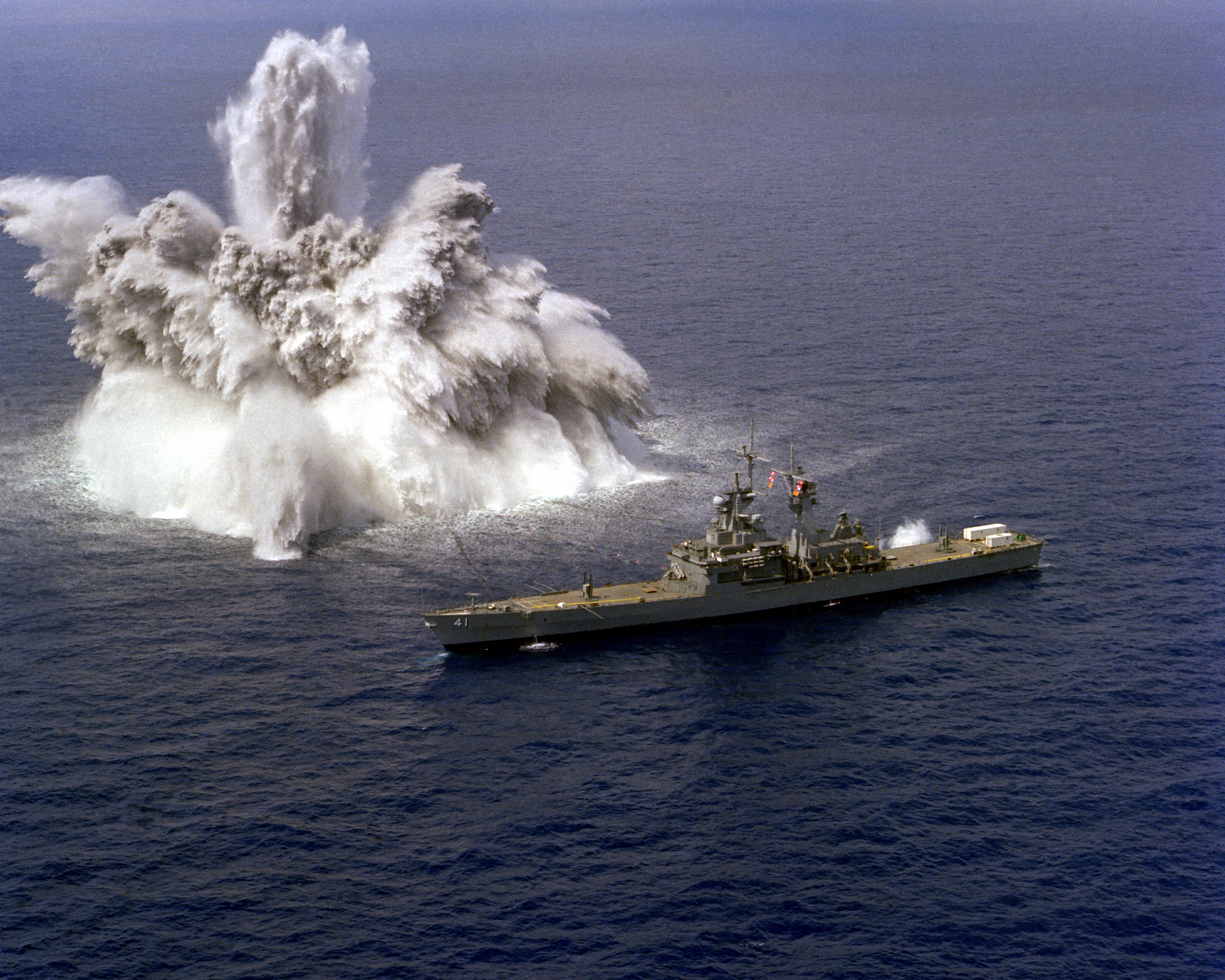
Explosive shock test of naval ship; equipment on board is isolated from shocks by shock mounts

Shock mounts are found in a wide variety of applications.

They can be used to isolate the foundation or substrate from the dynamics of the mounted equipment. This is vital on submarines where silence is critical to mission success. Yachts also use shock mounts to dampen mechanical noise (mainly transmitted throughout the structure) and increase comfort. This is usually done through elastic supports and transmission couplings.

Other common examples are the motor and transmission mounts used in virtually every automobile manufactured today. Without isolation mounts, interior noise and comfort levels would be significantly different. Such shock and vibration-isolation mounts are often chosen by the nature of the dynamics produced by the equipment and the weight of the equipment.

Shock mounts can isolate sensitive equipment from undesirable dynamics of the foundation or substrate. Sensitive laboratory equipment must be isolated from shock from handling and ambient vibration. Military equipment and ships must be able to withstand nearby explosions.

Shock mounts are found in some disc drives and compact disc players, where the disc and reader assembly are held by soft bushings that isolate them from outside vibration and other outside forces, such as torsion. In this case, isolation mounts are often chosen by the sensitivity of the equipment to shock (fragility) and vibration (natural frequency) and the weight of the equipment.

For shock mounting to be effective, the input shock and vibration must be matched. A shock pulse is characterised by its peak acceleration, duration, and shape (half sine, triangular, trapezoidal, etc.). The shock response spectrum is a method for further evaluating mechanical shock.

Shock mounts used to isolate entire buildings from earthquakes are called base isolators.

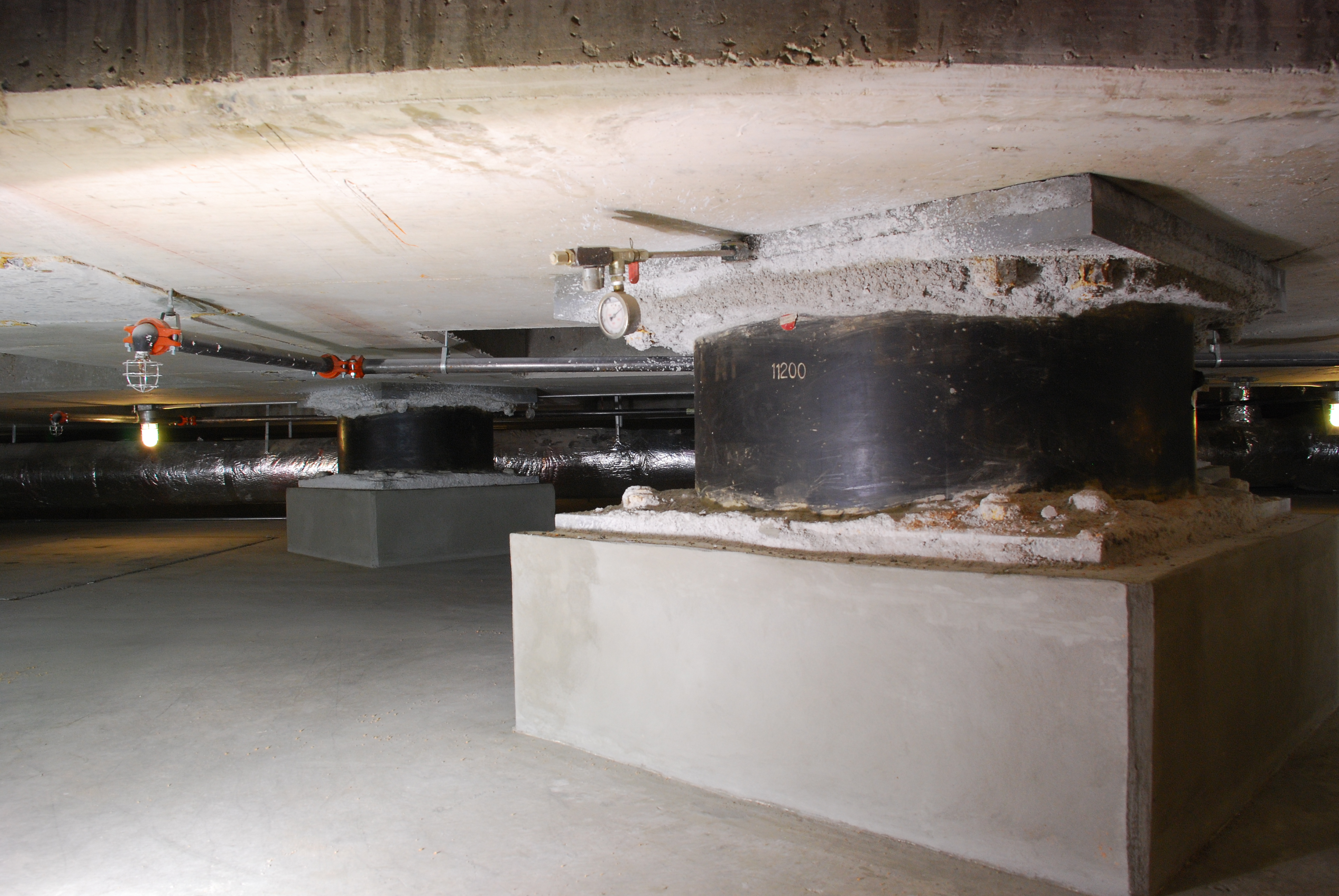
Base isolators under the Utah State Capitol building

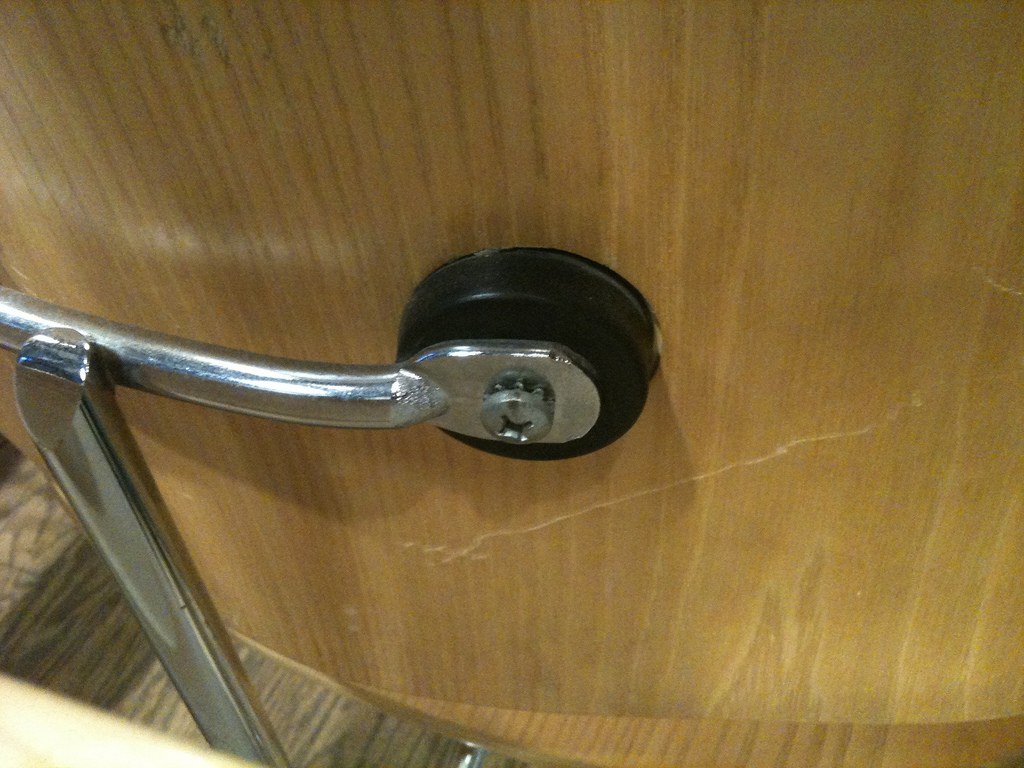
One of two shock mounts holding the back of the Eames Lounge Chair Wood (LCW). The black rubber is glued to the wood and the bolt only connects the metal to the rubber. Three similar shock mounts support the seat.

A similar idea, also known as a shock mount, is found in furniture design, introduced by Charles and Ray Eames. It provides some shock absorption and operates as a living hinge, allowing the seat back to pivot.

Shock mounts are also sometimes used in bicycle saddles, handlebars and chassis.

== Design ==
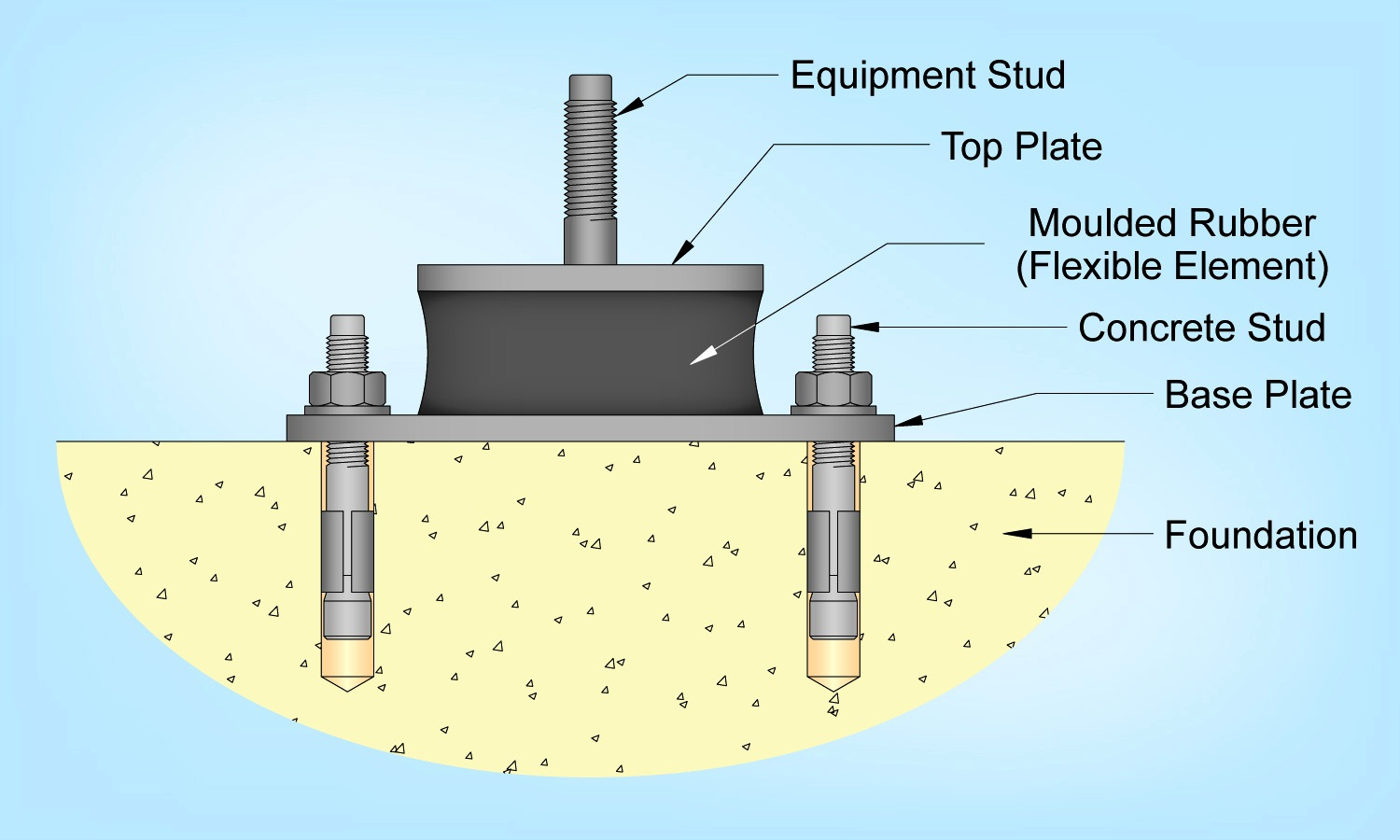
Molded Rubber Shock Isolation Mount

Maxwell and Kelvin–Voigt models of viscoelasticity use springs and dashpots in series and parallel circuits, respectively. Hydraulic and pneumatic components can be included, depending on the use.

=== Laminated pads ===
One common type of isolation mount is laminated pads. Generally, these pads consist of a cork or polymeric foam core which has been laminated between two pieces of ribbed neoprene sheet.

=== Molded rubber isolation mounts ===
Molded rubber isolation mounts are typically manufactured for specific applications. The best example of this is automotive engine and transmission mounts. Rubber bushings compress synthetic rubber rings on bolts to provide some isolation – operating temperature is sometimes a factor. Other shock mounts have mechanical springs or an elastomer (in tension or compression) engineered to isolate an item from specified mechanical shock and vibration. Some form of dashpot is usually used with a spring to provide viscous damping. Viscoelastic materials are common. Temperature is a factor in the dynamic response of rubber. Generally, a molded rubber mount is best suited for heavy loads producing higher frequency vibrations.

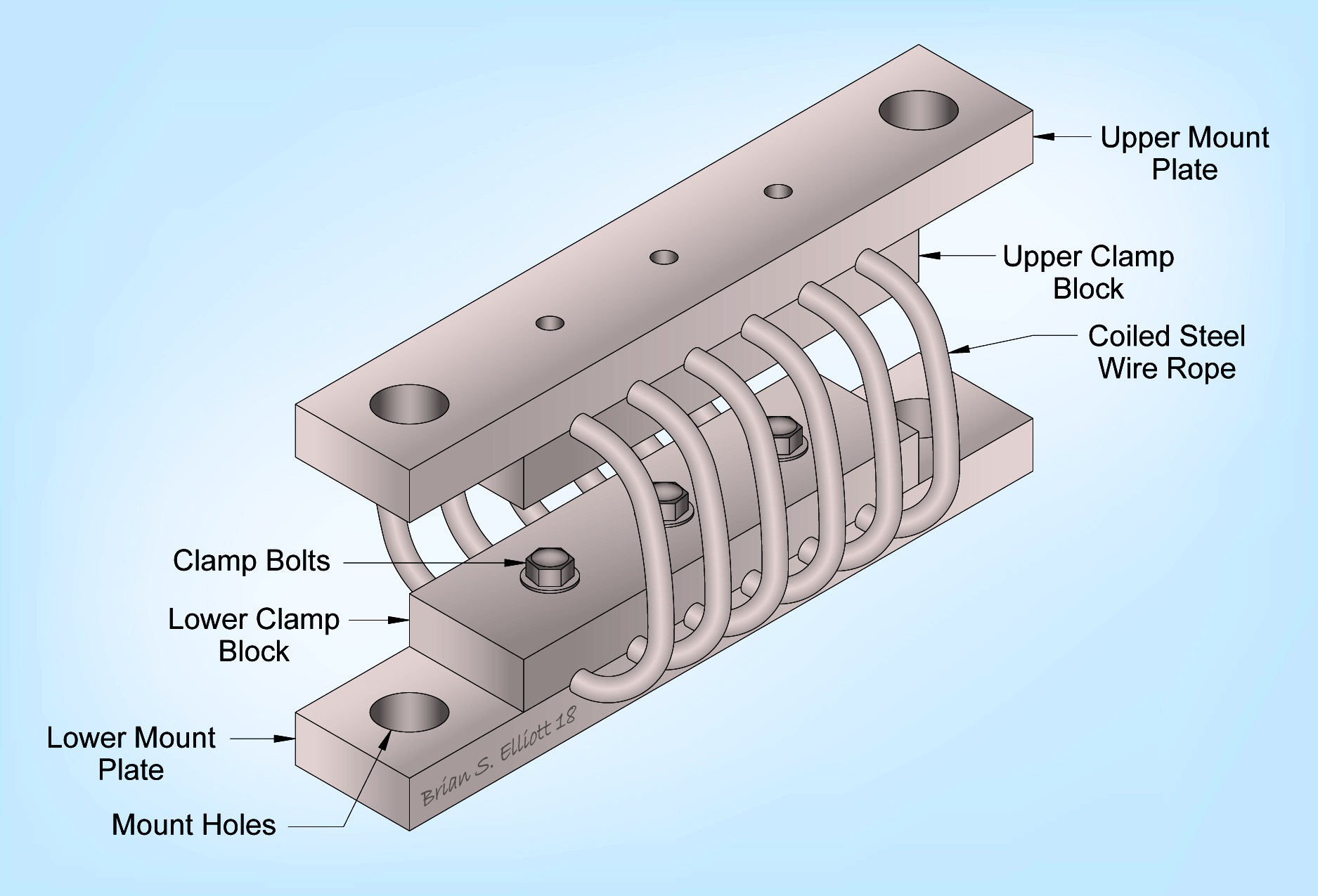
Coiled Cable Mount

=== Cable isolation mounts ===
Cable mounts are based around a coil of wire rope fixed to an upper and lower mounting bar. When properly matched to the load, these mounts provide isolation over a broad frequency range. They are typically applied to high-performance applications, such as mounting sensitive instrumentation into off-road vehicles and shipboard.

=== Coil spring isolation mounts ===
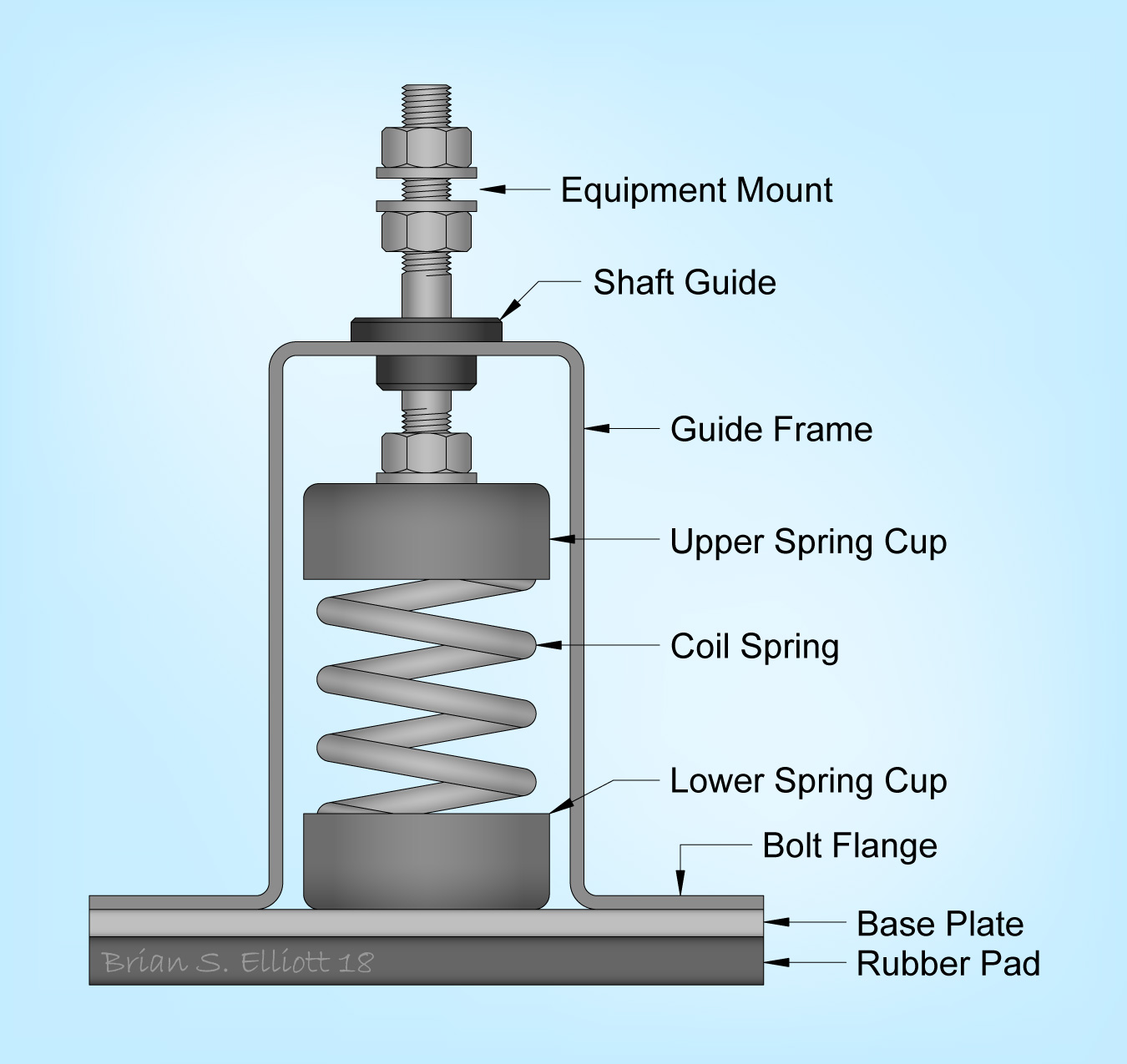
Typical Coil Spring Isolation Mount

Coil spring isolation mounts generally provide the greatest degree of movement and the best low-frequency performance. They are particularly popular for mounting equipment in buildings such as air handlers, filtration units, air conditioning and refrigeration systems and large pipes. Their degree of movement makes them ideal for applications where high flexure and/or expansion and contraction are a consideration.

== Microphone mounts ==
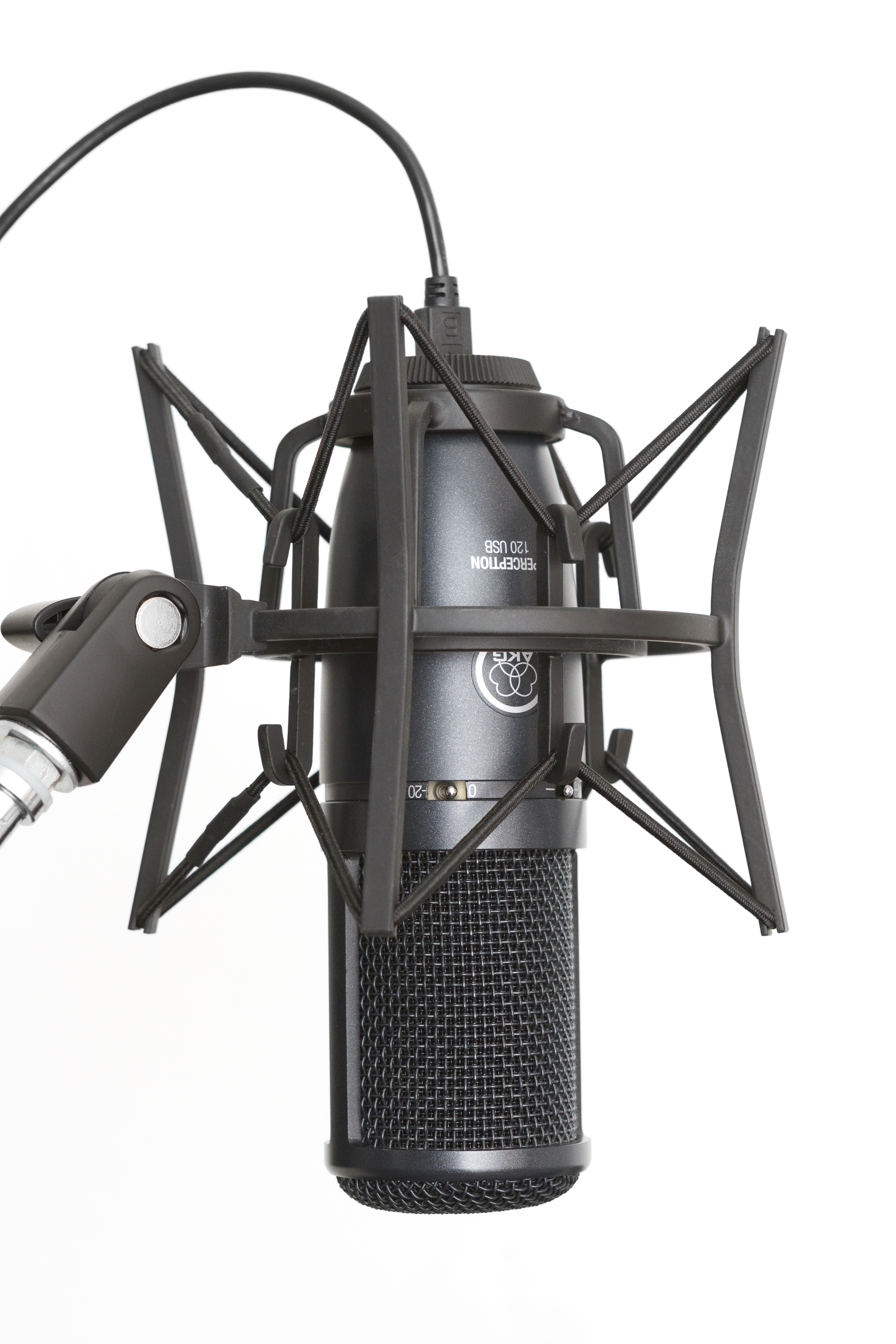
Large element condenser microphone in shock mount

Shock mounts for microphones can provide basic protection from damage, but their prime use is to isolate microphones from mechanically transmitted noise. This can originate as floor vibrations transmitted through a floor stand, or handling noise on boom poles. All microphones behave to some extent as accelerometers, with the most sensitive axis being perpendicular to the diaphragm. Additionally, some microphones contain internal elements such as vacuum tubes and transformers which can be inherently microphonic. These are often cushioned by resilient internal methods, in addition to the employment of external isolation mounts.

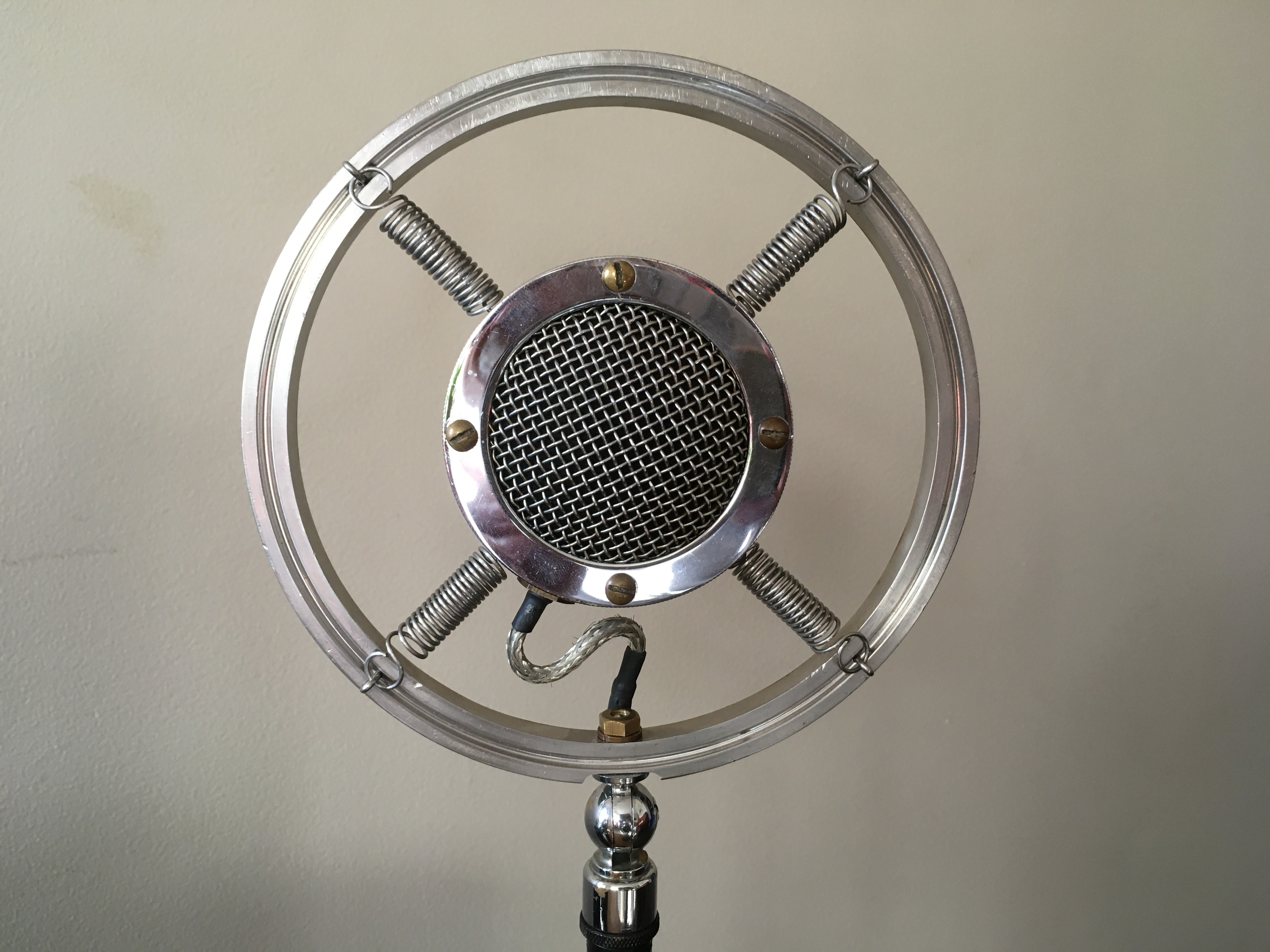
Astatic crystal microphone in a 'ring and spring' mount

Early microphones used a 'ring and spring' mount, where a single rigid ring was mounted and carried the microphone between a number of coil springs, usually four or eight. When early microphones were heavy and omnidirectional, this was adequate. However, the single plane of suspension allowed the microphone to twist very easily; once microphones started to become directional, this twisting caused fading of the signal. A more three-dimensional and less planar suspension would be required.

Large side-address studio microphones are generally strung in "cat's cradle" mounts, using fabric-wound rubber elastic elements to provide isolation. While the elastic elements can deteriorate and sag over time, the low price of the mount and ease of replacing the elastic elements mean they remain a mainstay despite the introduction of elastomer-based designs less susceptible to degradation over time.

The same occurs for end-fire microphones, most often employed for location work; however, positioning consistency issues in mobile contexts mean elastomer-based alternatives have made more inroads: they offer more displacement (positional flexibility) along the prime axis, but better restrict movement along other axes, and have less tendency to keep oscillating after movements, which provide for better control of the microphone's precise position.

== See also ==
- Bushing
- Vibration isolation
- Shock absorber
- MIL-S-901
- Microphonics
- Cushioning
