= Microphone stand =

Mount for a microphone

A microphone stand

A microphone stand is a free-standing mount for a microphone. It allows the microphone to be positioned in the studio, on stage or on location without requiring a person to hold it.

The most basic microphone stand is a straight stand. It uses a dome-shaped round metal base, or a tripod base, into which is threaded a post for mounting the microphone (most commonly a 5/8-27 threaded hole). This post may be made up of two or more telescoping tubes that fit inside each other, allowing for quick height adjustment. The mechanism for adjusting the height is called the clutch.

There are various versions of the straight stand known as the "desk stand" (short version of straight stand) and heavy-duty microphone stand (heavier base and larger tubes) to handle heavy microphones. The tubes used on the straight stand usually have a shiny chrome plating to resist scratching, but may also be finished in a matte black.

A very popular updated version of the straight stand uses the "folding tripod base stand", instead of the round, domed metal base. This folding base allows for easier packing of the stand when moving from location to location and reduces the weight of the stand. However, to compensate for the lack of weight at the base while still maintaining stability, the three "feet" of the tripod must extend out beyond the radius of a round base. The trade-off is that these "feet" may become a trip-hazard on a dark stage.

A number of accessories make microphone stands more useful. Most of these are designed to get the microphone closer to the user without placing the upright portion of the stand directly in front of the performer.

A "boom arm" attaches to the top of the stand so the microphone can move in the horizontal plane. A guitar player, for example, might use this to place the microphone directly in front of his mouth without having the upright portion of the stand in the way of the guitar. It also lets musicians have the microphone closer to the sound source when floor space is at a premium. This can be particularly useful when placing microphones on a drum stand when the microphone stands must compete for space with things like cymbal stands. Boom arms are offered both in fixed length and adjustable (telescoping) lengths.

Another handy device for adjusting microphone placement is a flexible goose neck tube. Made of a spiral-wound core of steel, goosenecks are made in various lengths and finishes and provide the ability to make minute changes in microphone position.

Microphones typically attach to the stand via a detachable microphone holder screwed to the end of the boom. (Some microphones screw directly onto the boom.) Commonly used screw threads (from large to small) are:

- 5/8 in (16 mm) 27 threads per inch (tpi) Unified Special thread (UNS, U.S. and the rest of the world)
- 1/2 in (13 mm) 12 threads per inch (tpi) BSW used in older German and European stands
- 3/8 in (9.5 mm) 16 threads per inch (tpi) BSW (uncommon in the U.S., used in the rest of the world)
- 1/4 in (6.4 mm) 20 threads per inch (tpi) BSW (uncommon in the U.S., used in the rest of the world)

Various male/female adapters are available to connect dissimilar sizes. Note: A compatible 1/4 in (6.4 mm) 20 tpi UNC is common in photography tripods

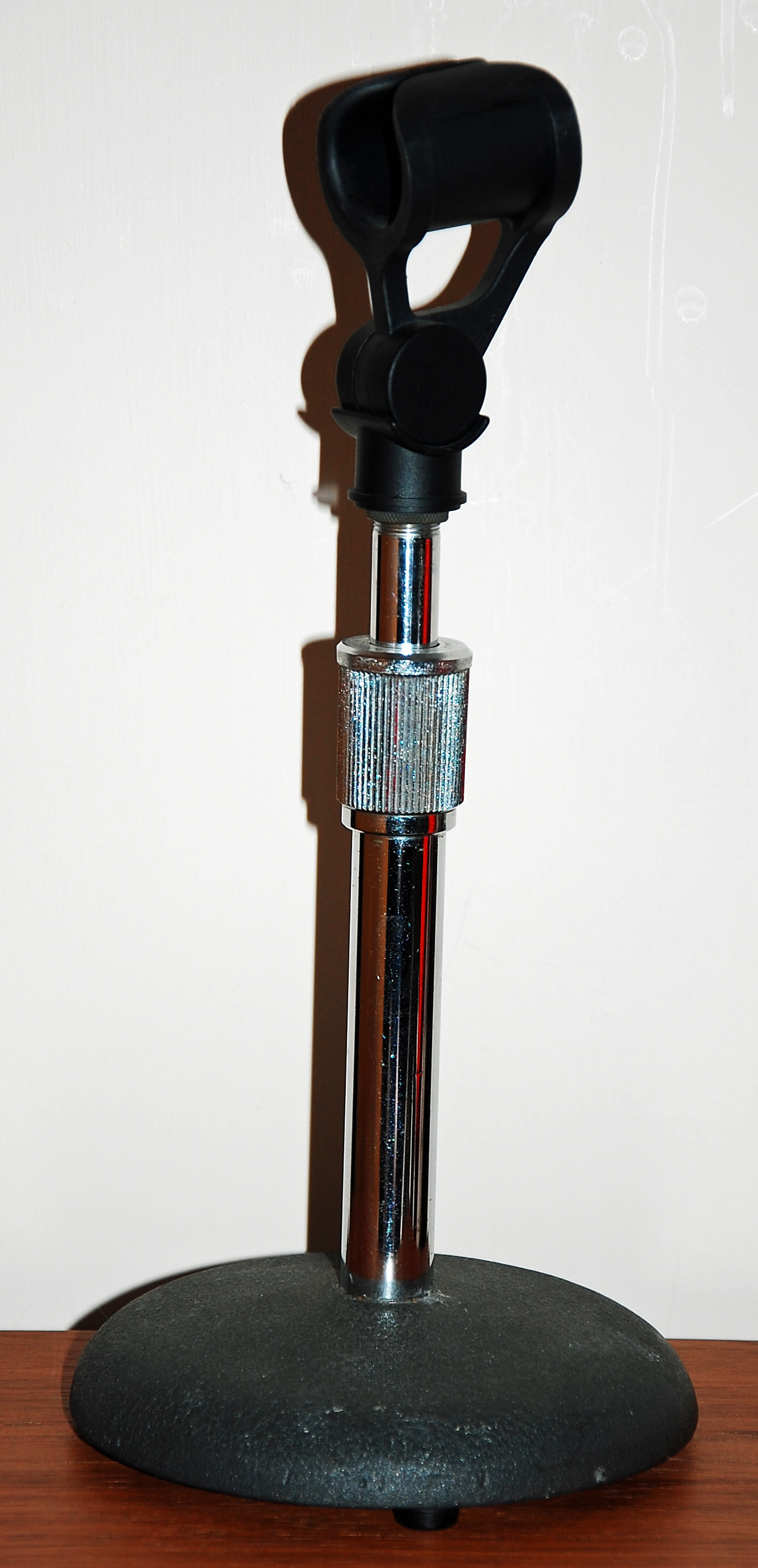
Desktop microphone stand

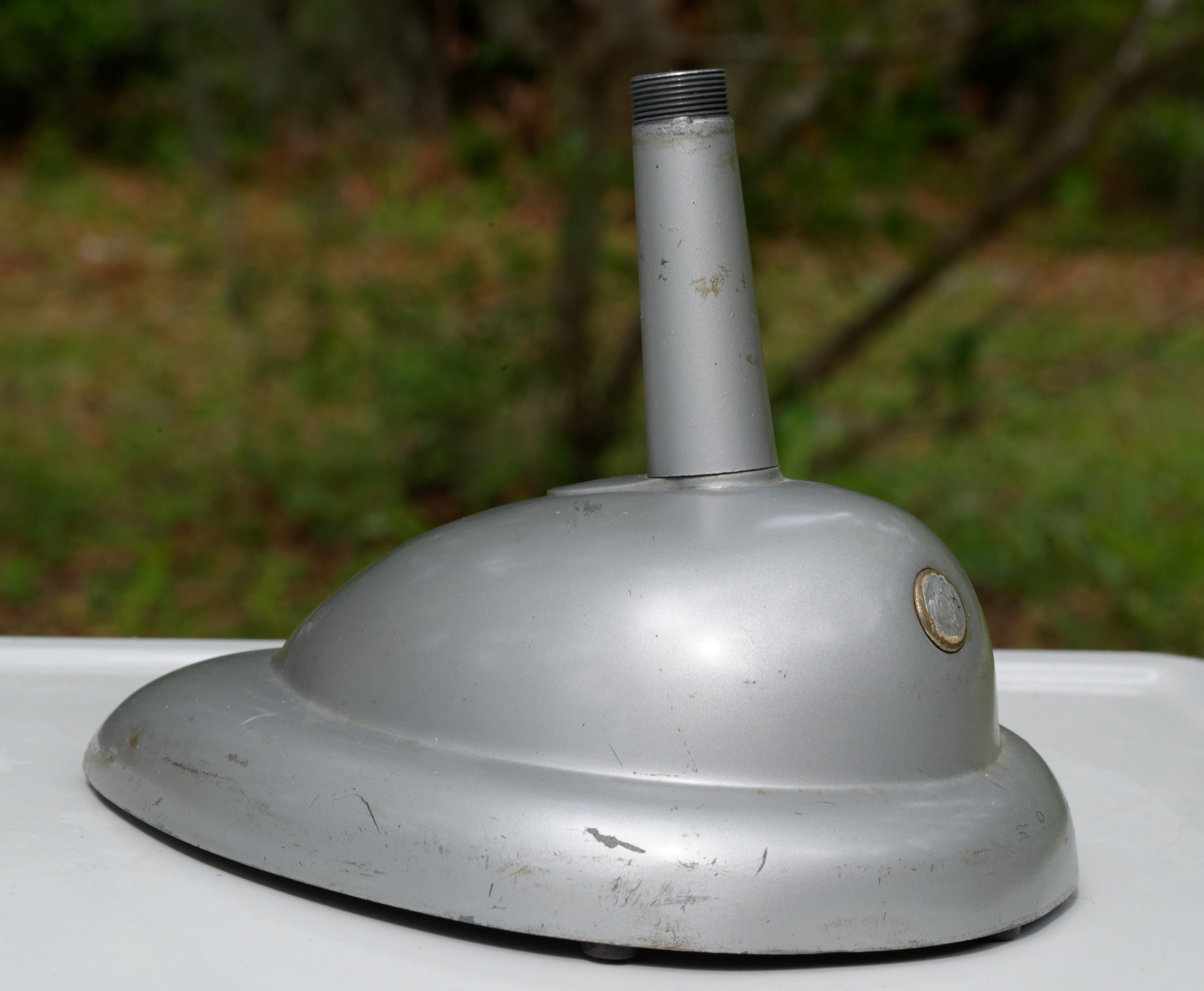
Shure model S36 desktop microphone stand

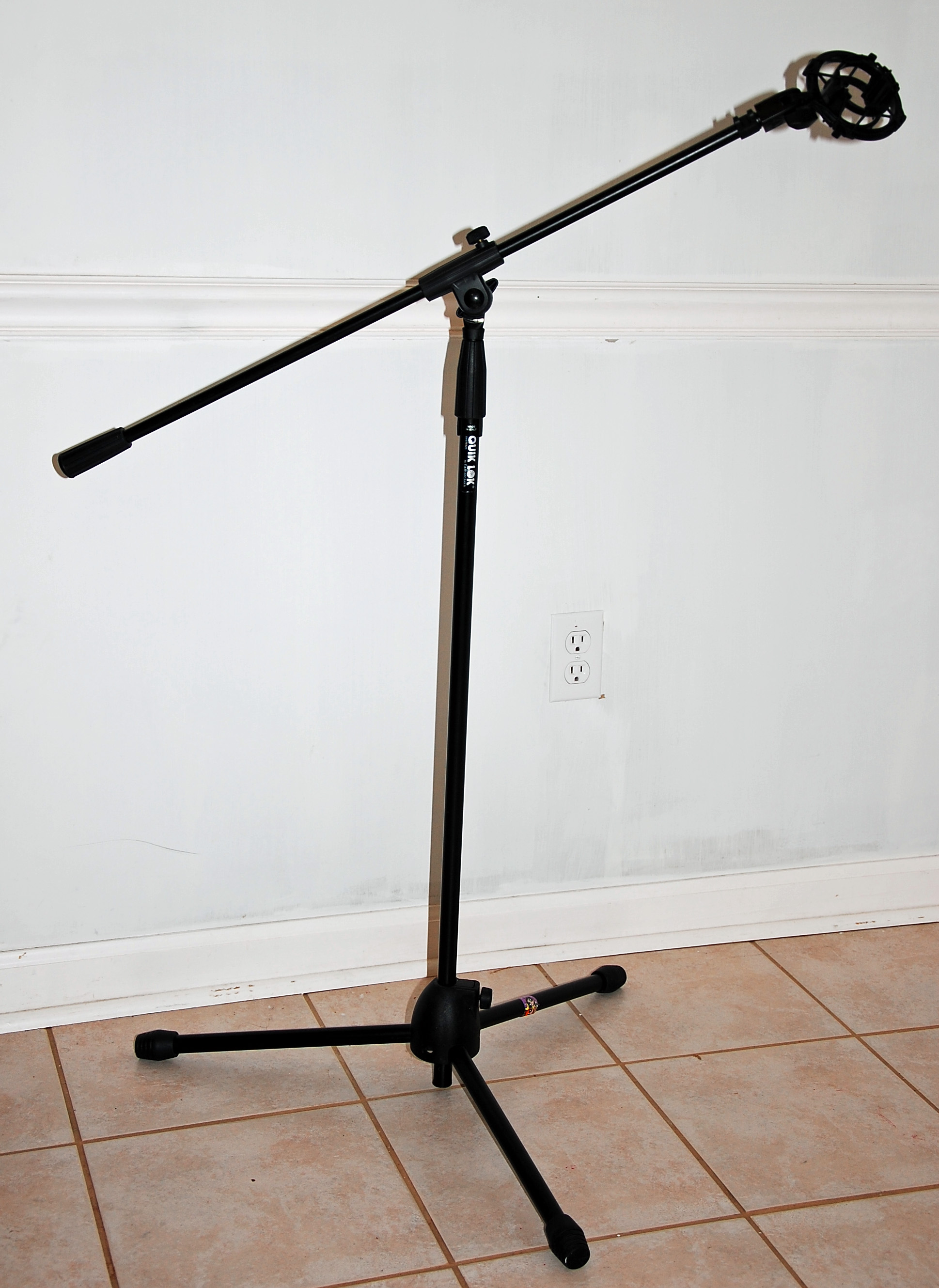
Microphone stand with folding tripod base, boom arm, and shock mount

== Bottomless microphone stand ==
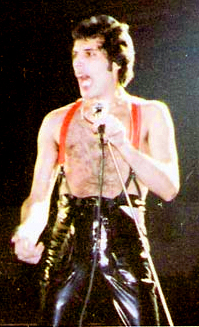
Freddie Mercury using a bottomless microphone stand

A rare type of microphone stand is the bottomless microphone stand—essentially a microphone stand with no base, so a singer must hold it throughout a live performance. It is useful as a mobile prop.

Freddie Mercury (the lead singer of Queen), discovered the device by accident: he grabbed a standard microphone stand with such force that it dislodged from its base. For the rest of his career he used a bottomless microphone stand regularly. Robbie Williams as well as heavy metal singers Joey Belladonna of Anthrax and Chuck Billy of Testament also use bottomless microphone stands.

== See also ==
- Shock mount
