= MIL-S-901 =

US military standard for shock resistance of shipboard equipment

Chassis Plans Rugged 901D Computer

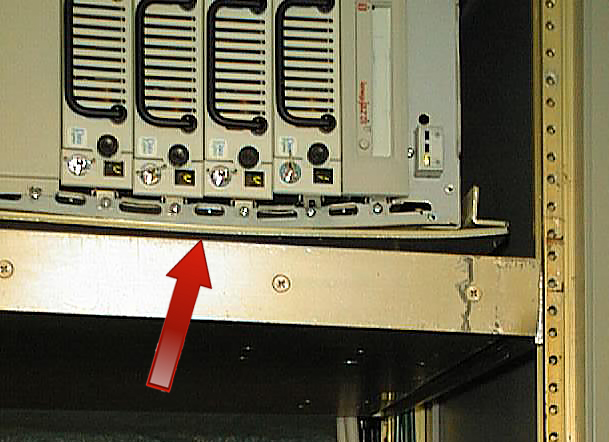
Close-up of Equipment Failure from MIL-S-901D Barge Test

Military Specification MIL-S-901D is for high-impact mechanical shock which applies to equipment mounted on ships. Its publication date was Mar 17, 1989. Two levels apply: Grade A items are items which are essential to the safety and continued combat capability of the ship; Grade B items are items whose operation is not essential to the safety and combat capability of the ship but which could become a hazard to personnel, to Grade A items, or to the ship as a whole as a result of exposure to shock. "Grade C", signifying that no shock qualification is required, is also sometimes referenced in acquisition documents even though the term has no official standing in the specification document. Qualification testing is performed on a specified machine or on a barge floating in a pond where an explosive charge is detonated at various distances and depths in the pond to impart shock to the barges.

The MIL-S-901D specification covers shock testing requirements for ship board machinery, equipment, systems, and structures, excluding submarine pressure hull penetrations. The purpose of these requirements is to verify the ability of shipboard installations to withstand shock loadings which may be incurred during wartime service due to the effects of nuclear or conventional weapons.

== Test classifications ==
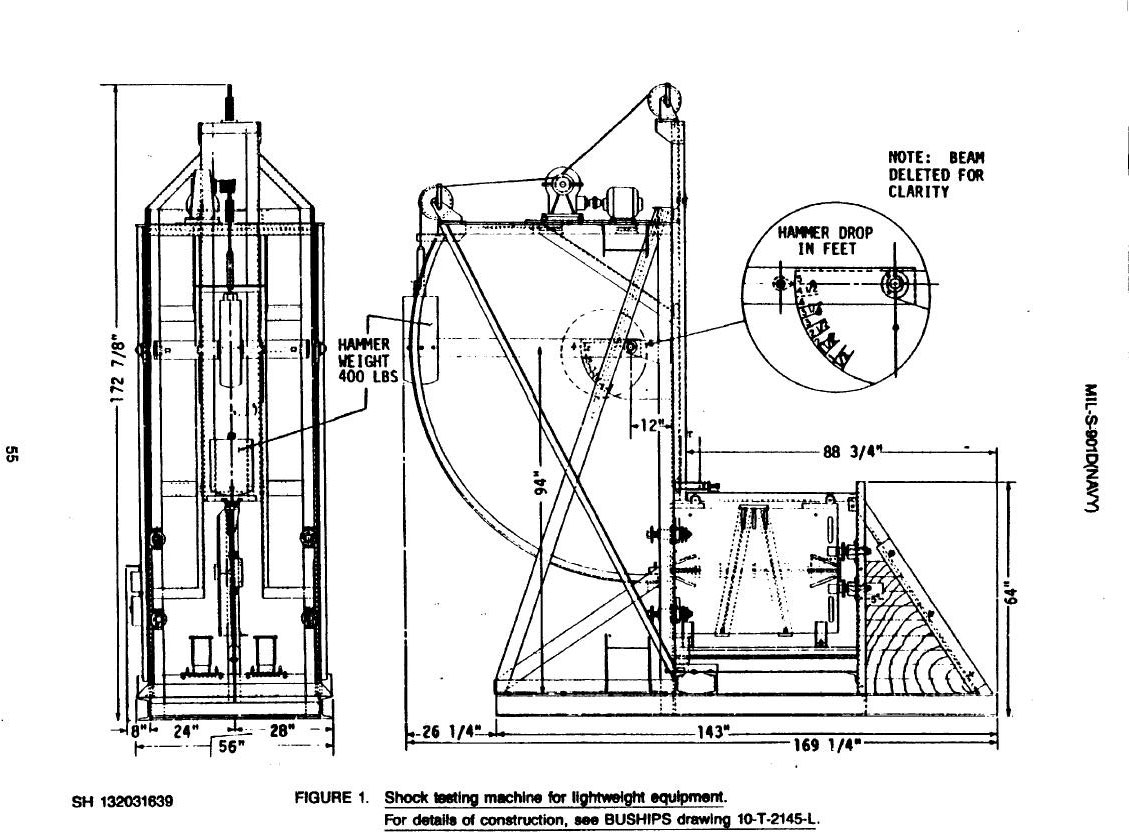
Shock testing machine for light weight equipment

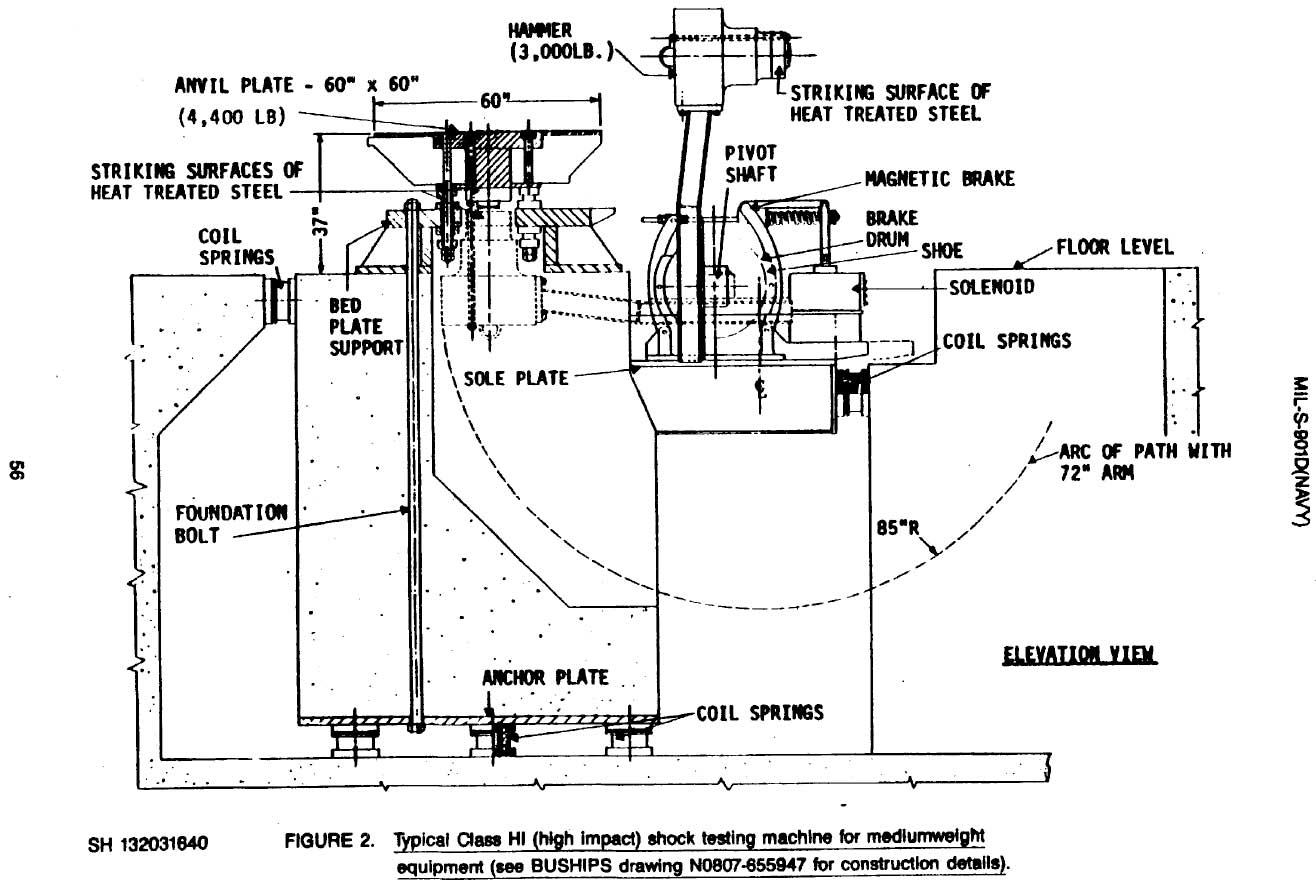
Shock testing machine (high impact) for medium weight equipment

Tests shall be classified in accordance with one of the following test categories, as specified.

- Lightweight. The lightweight test is a test performed on the lightweight shock machine. Weight of the test item including fixture to attach it to the test machine shall be less than a maximum of 550 pounds (250 kg).
- Medium weight. The medium weight test is a test performed on the medium weight shock machine. Weight of the test item including fixture to attach it to the test machine shall be less than a maximum of 7,400 pounds (3,400 kg).
- Heavyweight. The heavyweight test is a test performed on a standard or large floating shock platform.

Items to be tested shall be classified in accordance with one of the following grades, as specified:

- Grade A. Grade A items are items which are essential to the safety and continued combat capability of the ship.
- Grade B. Grade B items are items whose operation is not essential to the safety and combat capability of the ship but which could become a hazard to personnel, to grade A items, or to the ship as a whole as a result of exposure to shock.

Items to be tested shall be classified in accordance with one of the following classes, as specified:

- Class I. Class I equipment is defined as that which is required to meet these shock requirements without the use of resilient mountings installed between the equipment and the ship structure or foundation.
- Class II. Class II equipment is defined as that which is required to meet these shock requirements with the use of resilient mountings installed between the equipment and the ship structure or shipboard foundation.
- Class III. Unless otherwise specified, class III equipment is defined as that which has shipboard application both with and without the use of resilient mountings and is therefore required to meet both class I and class II requirements.

Tests shall be classified in accordance with one of the following types, as specified:

- Type A. A type A test is a test of a principal unit. This is the preferred test. Principal units are items which are directly supported by the ship structure or by a foundation which is directly attached to the ship structure, and items mounted in piping systems, ducting systems, and similar systems which are supported by ship structure. The shock response of a principal unit is primarily a function of the rigidity and mass of the item and the shipboard mounting structure, the shipboard mounting location, and the configuration of the item. Such items typically include diesel generator sets, air conditioning plants, switchboards, radio transmitter, steam generators, missile launchers, and valves (if installed in piping which is supported by ship structure).
- Type B. A type B test is a test of a subsidiary component. Subsidiary components are items which are the major parts of a principal unit. The shock response of the subsidiary component is significantly affected by that of the associated principal unit and all associated subsidiary components. The shock responses of the associated principal unit and all associated subsidiary components are significantly affected by that of the subsidiary component. Examples are the diesel engine of a diesel-generator set, the electric motor of an air conditioning unit, or the power supply section of a radio transmitter.
- Type C. A type C test is a test of a sub-assembly. Sub assemblies are items which are a part of a principal unit or a subsidiary component. The shock response of the sub-assembly is significantly affected by that of the associated principal unit or subsidiary component, but the shock response of the principal unit or subsidiary component is not significantly affected by the sub-assembly. Examples are thermometers, gauges, meters, relays, and resistors. The distinction between sub-assembly and assembly or part as used herein may be different than that used in various equipment specifications or other acquisition documents.

== Barge Test ==
MIL-S-901D Barge Test Video at Moment of Explosion

The barge test or heavyweight test requires the item under test to be mounted on a floating barge. For the standard floating platform, 60 pounds (27 kg) of HBX-1 explosive is placed 24 feet (7.3 m) underwater at various distances from the barge and detonated. There are four 'shots'. The first is placed on the fore-and-aft axis, 40 feet (12 m) from the barge. Shots 2, 3, and 4 are placed athwart ship at distances of 30, 25 and 20 feet (9.1, 7.6 and 6.1 m). The distance refers to the near side of the floating platform.

For the large floating platform, 300 pounds (140 kg) of HBX-1 is placed 20 feet (6.1 m) under water and the distances are 110, 80, 65, and 50 feet (34, 24, 20, and 15 m) from the barge with the first shot fore-and-aft and the other three shots athwart ship.

A hammer test can be used to pre-qualify an item and to identify deficiencies but, ultimately, the items to be certified compliant with MIL-S-901D will be tested on a barge.

== Applicability to products ==
Suppliers can and some do take significant latitude with how they test their products, as well as how they report the test results. As a result, claims of "compliance with MIL-S-901" can be misleading. Users who require rugged products should verify the test methods (i) against which compliance is claimed; (ii) to which parameter limits were actually tested; and (iii) whether the testing was done internally or externally by an independent testing facility.

== Products: electric motors ==
Military standard MIL-DTL-17060G(SH), confirms two types of electric motors, Service C and Service A.

- Service C motors. Service C motors shall be marine type commercial motors. Service C motors shall meet the requirements of MIL-S-901 for Grade B shock.
- Service A motors. Service A for driven auxiliaries including propulsion, which are essential to the military effectiveness of a ship, should be heavy-duty, high impact, shock-resistant motors. Service A motors shall meet MIL-E-917 and the requirements of MIL-S-901 for Grade A. Nonmagnetic electric motors for mine countermeasures vessel and electric motors for submarine service shall always meet Service A.

High-impact shock test for electric motors is defined into weight categories. Tests for lightweight motors shall be nine blows delivered while the motor is operating under no-load at nominal speed. An additional nine blows shall be delivered with the motor stationary. Tests specified in MIL-S-901 for medium weight motors shall be conducted with the motor running under no-load at nominal speed or with the motor stationary. Motors may be submitted for each series of three blows

Motors weighing 250 pounds (110 kg) or less shall be tested on the lightweight shock testing machine. Motors weighing in excess of 250 pounds and up to 6,000 pounds (2,700 kg) shall be tested on a medium weight shock testing machine. Motors weighing over 6,000 pounds shall be tested on a floating shock test platform or barge test.
