= Transit case =

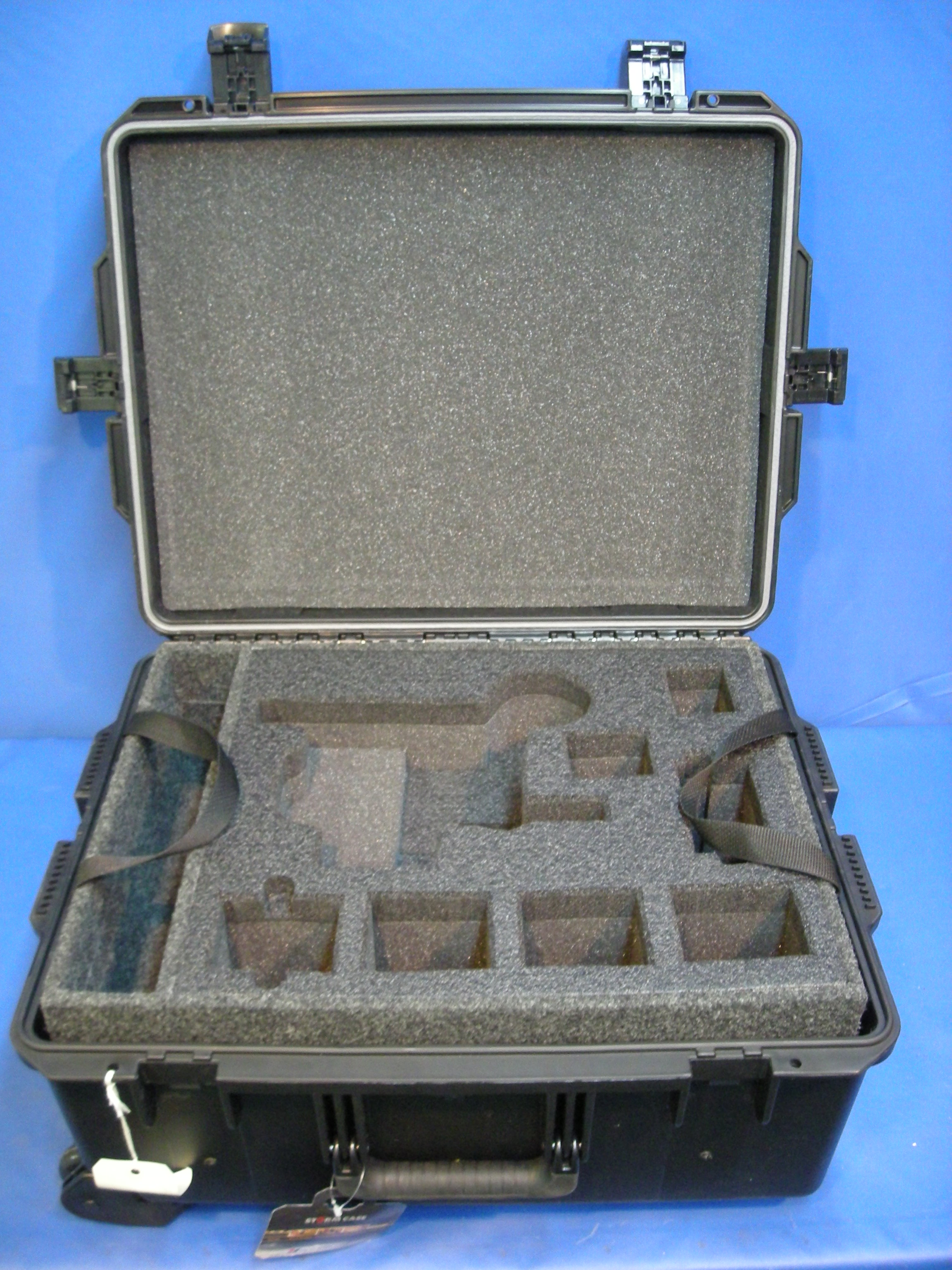
Plastic molded transit case with pre-cut foam interior

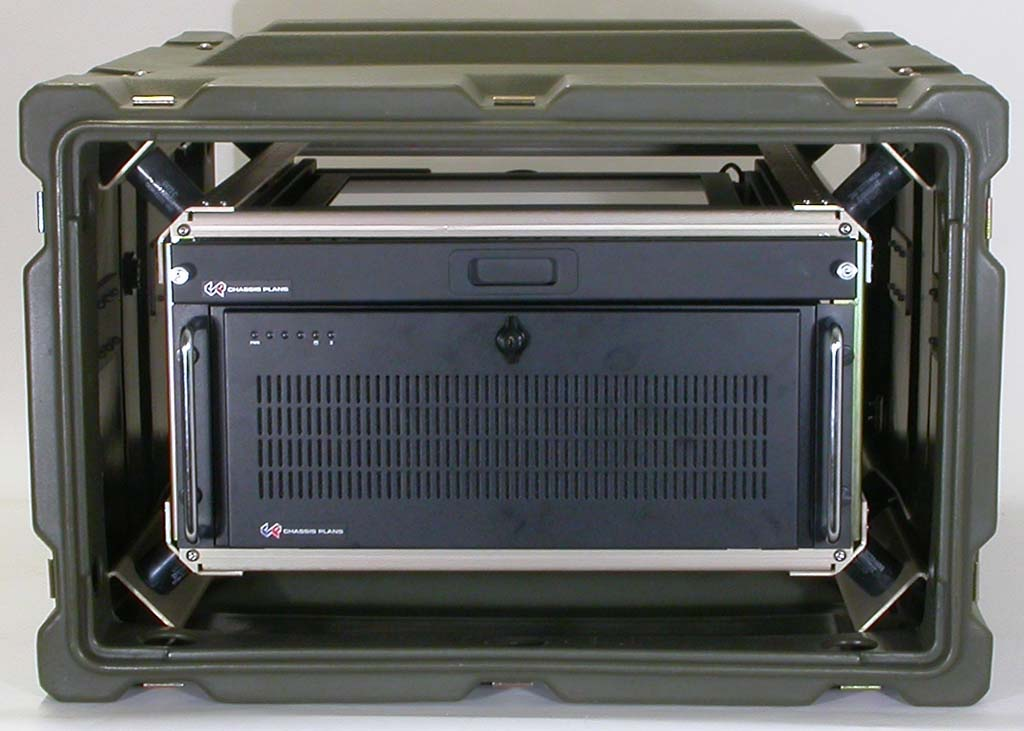
Rack Case with equipment showing internal 19-inch rack with shock mounting

A transit case is a hard-sided case intended for protecting and concealing defined contents during transportation. In some forms, the interior is filled with foam which has pockets molded or cut into it that equipment specifically fits into. Some transit cases are provided with foam inserts that completely fill the interior and the user can pluck out pieces to make the case fit a particular application. Many camera cases are built in this fashion allowing the user to tailor the interior foam to their particular equipment. The outside of the transit case provides protection against the environment and a first level of protection against mechanical damage such as shock. The interior foam or other structure cushions the equipment against shock and vibration and some protection against rapid temperature changes.

The difference between a transit case and a suit case is a transit case is configured with internal foam or other structure to hold and protect specific items. A suit case is an empty case in which items can be placed in any order with no predefined locations other than features such as internal pockets. An empty transit case can be used as a suit case.

Transit cases can be procured in virtually any size to contain something very small to very large which may require several people or a fork lift to move.

Road cases are a subset of transit cases. Road cases are traditionally manufactured with plywood sides and metal corner braces. Transit cases are usually molded or formed from plastic, composite materials or aluminum so the top and bottom sections are seamless.

A rack case is a transit case with provision for mounting rackmount equipment such as amplifiers, computers, displays, radios, encryption devices, and so forth. In many cases, the internal 19-inch rack is mounted to the transit case via shock absorbing mounts giving the rack sway space to attenuate shocks and bumps that might be seen during shipment and handling.

== Features ==
A wide variety of features and options are available for transit cases. The minimum feature set would include: rugged construction to protect the contents from mechanical abuse, tailored internal cushioning, blocking, and bracing, environmental sealing to protect against moisture, humidity, rain, dust, insects, chemicals, etc., multiple draw-down latches to firmly secure the covers on all sides.

Other available features may include the following: hinged or lift-off lid, two removable end caps, pre-cut foam, custom factory-cut foam, or do-it-yourself foam, rackmount rails for installation of 19-inch rackmount equipment, shock mounts for an internal rackmount frame, Retractable handles which are protected in some regard during shipping, airtight seal when the lid is closed and latched down, atmospheric pressure equalization valve, nitrogen filler valve, humidity indicators, wheels or casters, wheels and an extensible handle similar to a pull-around suitcase, legs to allow the removed lid to be used as a desk, and environmental controls: air conditioners, heaters or fans.

== Construction ==
The principle design of a transit case is to assure environmental sealing and protection for the contents in adverse circumstances. Thus, construction techniques that provide seamless components (body, lid, end caps) are primarily used: rotomolded and thermoformed polyethylene, rotomolded LLDPE thermoplastic, deep drawn aluminum, fiberglass reinforced thermoset composites, FRP composite (fiberglass reinforced polyester), carbon fiber composite, carbon fiber / Kevlar composites, laminated materials (mostly used on road cases)

== Standards ==
- ATA 300 for airline transportation survivability
- MIL-HDBK-304C - Package Cushioning Design
- MIL-P-116 - Preservation methods
- MIL-STD-130 - Marking or printing identification data
- MIL-STD-648D - Design Criteria Standard Specialized Shipping Containers
- MIL-STD-810F - Environmental test methods and engineering guidelines
- MIL-STD-1367A - Packaging, Handling Storage and Transportability Program Requirements for Systems and Equipment
- MIL-STD-1472 - Human Engineering
- MIL-STD-2073-1D - Standard Practice for Military Packaging
- MIL-T-4734 - Transit Cases, Combination Cases and Spare Parts Cases for Ground Electronic Equipment
- Fed Test Method Std 101 - Test procedures for packaging materials

== See also ==
- Road case
