= Shock (mechanics) =

Sudden transient acceleration

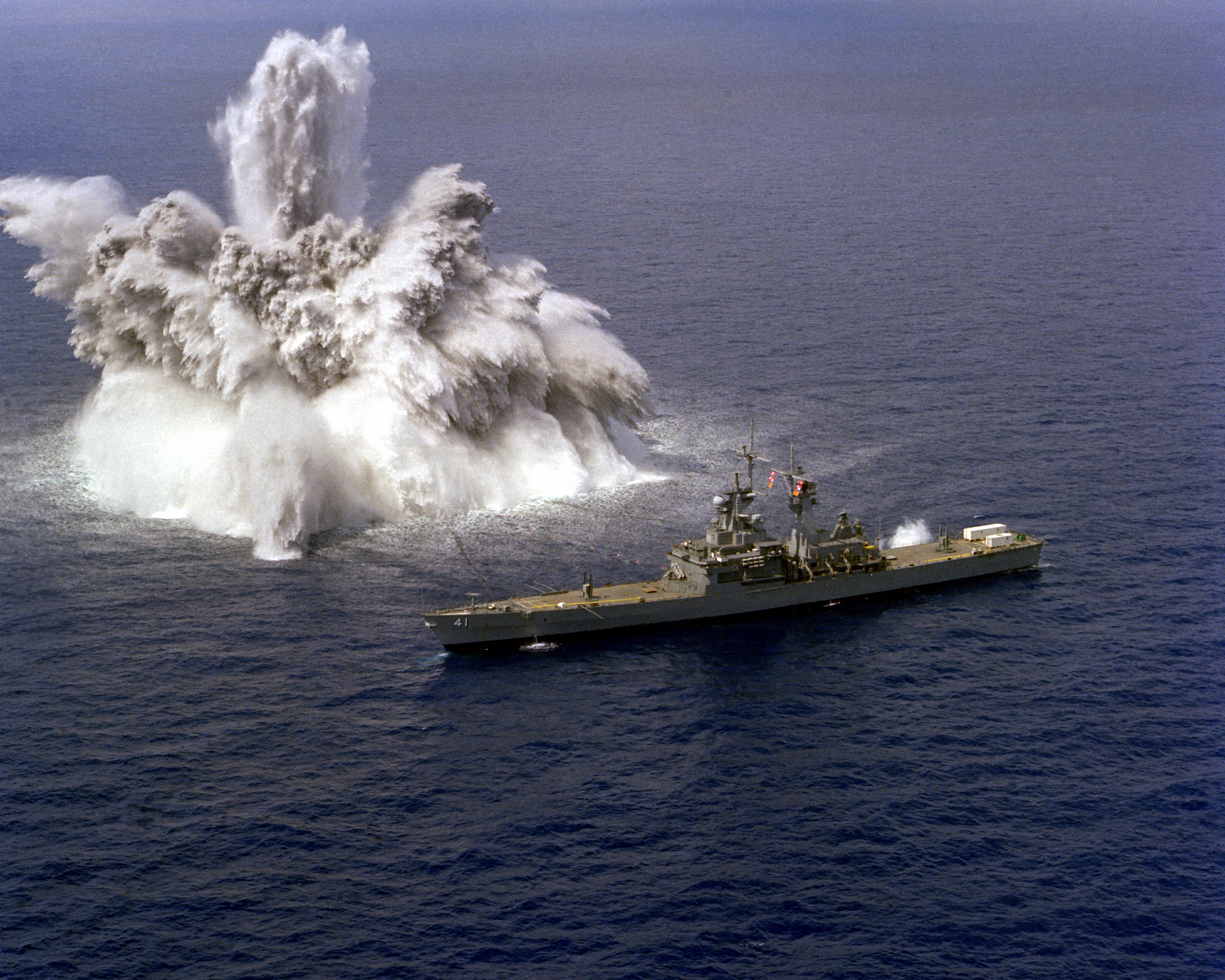
Explosive shock test of naval ship

In mechanics and physics, shock is a sudden and transient acceleration caused, for example, by impact, drop, kick, earthquake, or explosion. A mechanical shock typically consists of a short-duration, high-magnitude acceleration event that can cause structural deformation or failure in components.

Shock describes matter subject to extreme rates of force with respect to time. Shock is a vector that has units of an acceleration (rate of change of velocity). The unit g (or g) represents multiples of the standard acceleration of gravity and is conventionally used.

A shock pulse can be characterised by its peak acceleration, the duration, and the shape of the shock pulse (half sine, triangular, trapezoidal, etc.). The shock response spectrum is a method for further evaluating a mechanical shock.

== Measurement ==
Shock measurement is of interest in several fields such as

- Propagation of heel shock through a runner's body
- Measure the magnitude of a shock need to cause damage to an item: fragility.
- Measure shock attenuation through athletic flooring
- Measuring the effectiveness of a shock absorber
- Measuring the shock absorbing ability of package cushioning
- Measure the ability of an athletic helmet to protect people
- Measure the effectiveness of shock mounts
- Determining the ability of structures to resist seismic shock: earthquakes, etc.
- Determining whether personal protective fabric attenuates or amplifies shocks
- Verifying that a Naval ship and its equipment can survive explosive shocks

Shocks are usually measured by accelerometers but other transducers and high speed imaging are also used. A wide variety of laboratory instrumentation is available; stand-alone shock data loggers are also used.

Field shocks are highly variable and often have very uneven shapes. Even laboratory controlled shocks often have uneven shapes and include short duration spikes; Noise can be reduced by appropriate digital or analog filtering.

Governing test methods and specifications provide detail about the conduct of shock tests. Proper placement of measuring instruments is critical. Fragile items and packaged goods respond with variation to uniform laboratory shocks; Replicate testing is often called for. For example, MIL-STD-810G Method 516.6 indicates: at least three times in both directions along each of three orthogonal axes.

== Testing ==
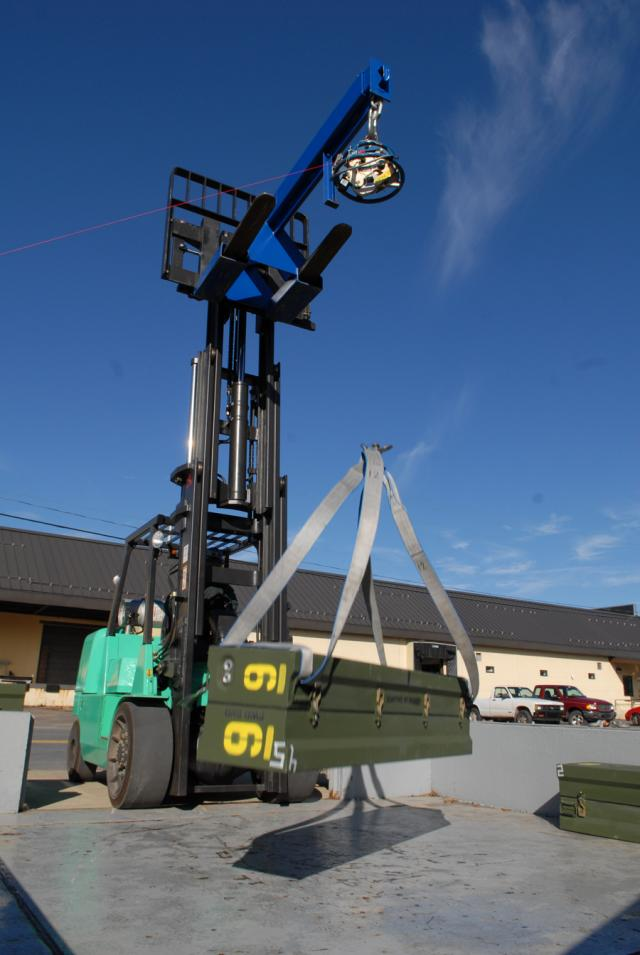
Military shipping container being drop tested

Shock testing typically falls into two categories, classical shock testing and pyroshock or ballistic shock testing. Classical shock testing consists of the following shock impulses: half sine, haversine, sawtooth wave, and trapezoid. Pyroshock and ballistic shock tests are specialized and are not considered classical shocks. Classical shocks can be performed on Electro Dynamic (ED) Shakers, Free Fall Drop Tower or Pneumatic Shock Machines. A classical shock impulse is created when the shock machine table changes direction abruptly. This abrupt change in direction causes a rapid velocity change which creates the shock impulse. Testing the effects of shock are sometimes conducted on end-use applications: for example, automobile crash tests. Pavement testing is typically conducted by subjecting the pavement to mechanical shocks from a falling weight deflectometer.

Use of proper test methods and Verification and validation protocols are important for all phases of testing and evaluation.

== Effects ==
Mechanical shock has the potential for damaging an item (e.g., an entire light bulb) or an element of the item (e.g. a filament in an Incandescent light bulb):

- A brittle or fragile item can fracture. For example, two crystal wine glasses may shatter when impacted against each other. A shear pin in an engine is designed to fracture with a specific magnitude of shock. Note that a soft ductile material may sometimes exhibit brittle failure during shock due to time-temperature superposition.
- A malleable item can be bent by a shock. For example, a copper pitcher may bend when dropped on the floor.
- Some items may appear to be not damaged by a single shock but will experience fatigue failure with numerous repeated low-level shocks.
- A shock may result in only minor damage which may not be critical for use. However, cumulative minor damage from several shocks will eventually result in the item being unusable.
- A shock may not produce immediate apparent damage but might cause the service life of the product to be shortened: the reliability is reduced.
- A shock may cause an item to become out of adjustment. For example, when a precision scientific instrument is subjected to a moderate shock, good metrology practice may be to have it recalibrated before further use.
- Some materials such as primary high explosives may detonate with mechanical shock or impact.
- When glass bottles of liquid are dropped or subjected to shock, the water hammer effect may cause hydrodynamic glass breakage.

== Considerations ==
When laboratory testing, field experience, or engineering judgement indicates that an item could be damaged by mechanical shock, several courses of action might be considered:

- Reduce and control the input shock at the source.
- Modify the item to improve its toughness or support it to better handle shocks.
- Use shock absorbers, shock mounts, or cushions to control the shock transmitted to the item. Cushioning reduces the peak acceleration by extending the duration of the shock.
- Plan for failures: accept certain losses. Have redundant systems available, etc.

== See also ==
- coefficient of restitution – Ratio characterising inelastic collisions
- Cushioning – Protective packaging
- Elastic collision – Collision in which kinetic energy is conserved
- Fracture mechanics – Study of propagation of cracks in materials
- Fracture toughness – Stress intensity factor at which a crack's propagation increases drastically
- g-force – Term for accelerations felt as weight in multiples of standard gravity
- Impact (mechanics) – Great force or shock applied over a short time period during a high-speed collision
- Jerk (physics) – Rate of change of acceleration with time
- Modal testing
- Plastic collision – Collision in which energy is lost to heat
- Pyroshock
- Response spectrum – Response of a structure to oscillation
- Shock mount – Device used for vibration isolation
- Shock data logger – Measurement instrument
- Shock detector – Indicator of physical shock or impact
- Shock factor – Figure of merit
- Shock wave – Propagating disturbance
- Thermal shock – Load caused by rapid temperature change
- Vibration – Mechanical oscillations about an equilibrium point
- Water hammer – Pressure surge when a fluid is forced to stop or change direction suddenly
- MIL-S-901 – US military standard for shock resistance of shipboard eqipment
- MIL-STD-810 – Military standard Section 516.6, Shock
