= History of the football helmet =

Professionals and amateurs alike wear protective headgear (helmets) to reduce the chance of injury while playing American and Canadian football (also known as gridiron football). The football helmet has changed over time and many different materials have become available. The rules of the game have changed as well.

== Origins ==
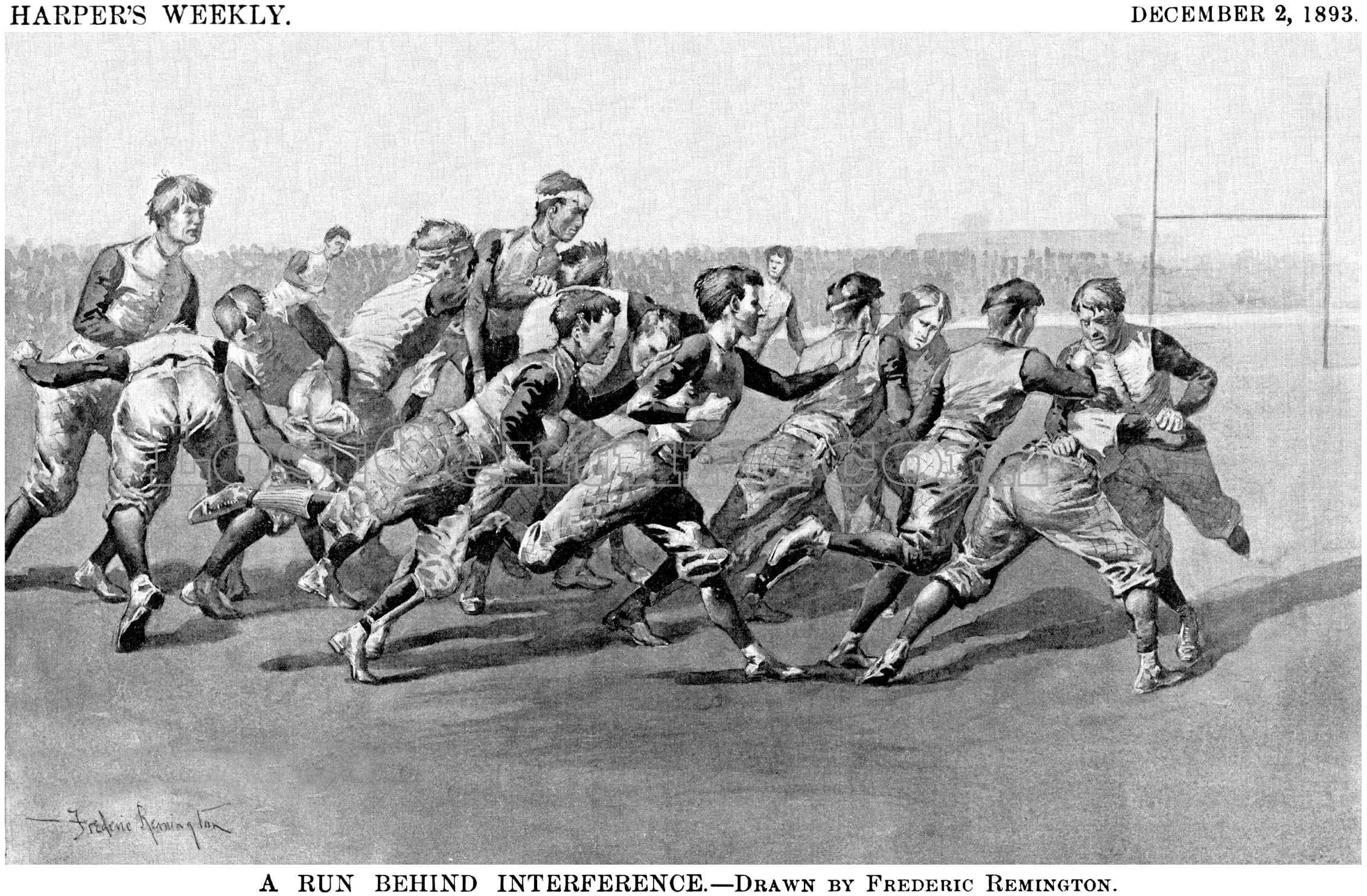
In the early days of American football, players did not wear helmets.

In 1888 the college football rules convention voted to allow tackling below the waist. Players and coaches soon regarded pads as essential for the game. However as in the National Hockey League during the 1970s, helmets were the last thing to be accepted. They were not a mandatory piece of equipment in college gridiron until 1939 and were not made mandatory in the National Football League until 1943 As a side note, "the last NFL player to play in a game without a helmet was Dick Plasman an end for the Chicago Bears in 1940." There is a photograph of him without one taken during the 1940 NFL Championship Game in which Chicago defeated the Washington Redskins 73–0.

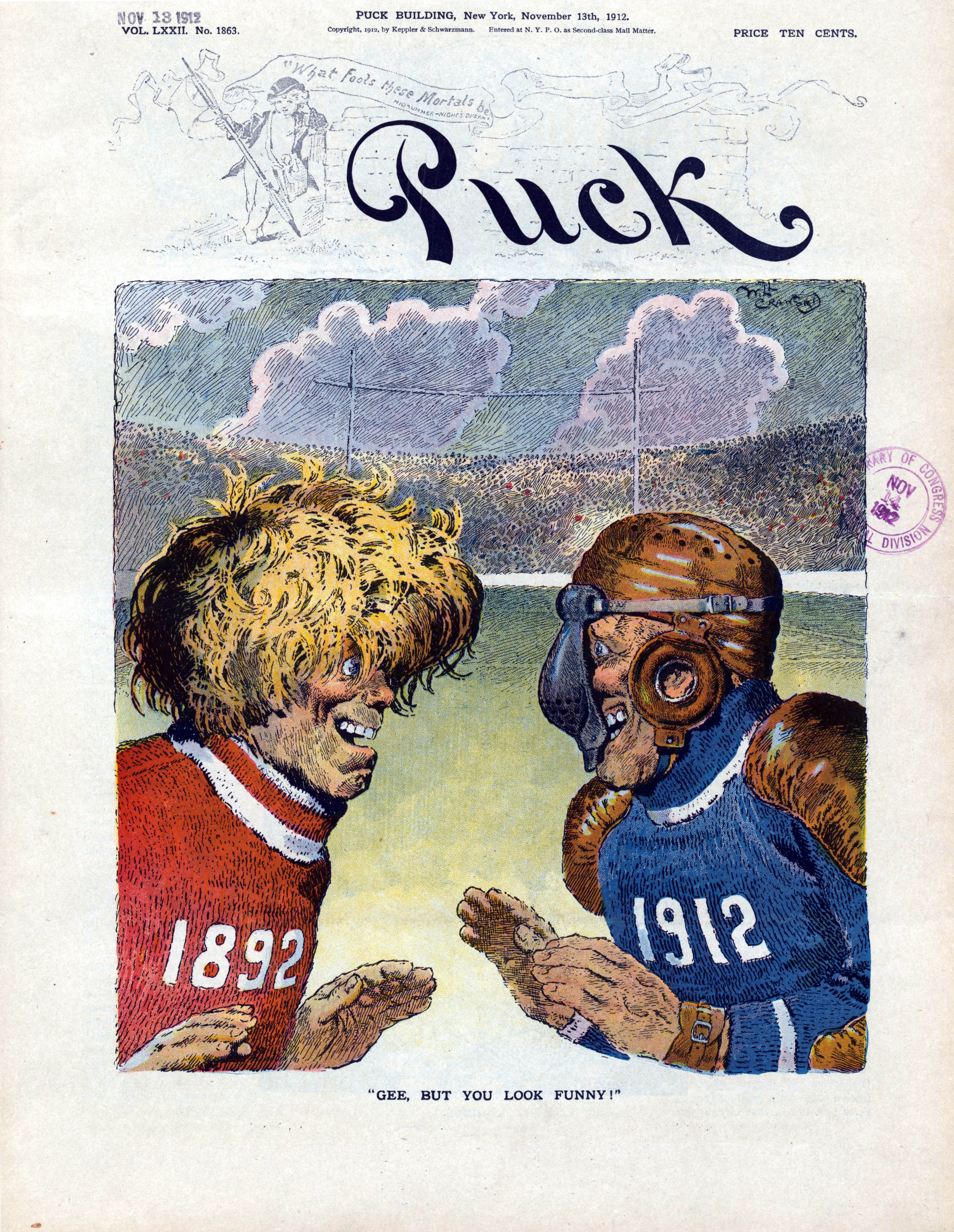
The cover of the November 13, 1912 issue Puck magazine featuring a cartoon of American football players from 1892 and 1912, the caption reads: Gee, but you look funny.. The player from 1892 has grown out hair and not wearing equipment.

Before the invention of the football helmet, players would often grow their hair long, because they believed it would protect their heads. The man largely credited with inventing the first helmet was George Barclay. In 1896 he designed a headgear which soon became known as a "head harness". It had three thick leather straps forming a close fit around his head, made by a harness maker. Additionally, other sources credit the invention of the football helmet to U.S. Naval Academy Midshipman Joseph M. Reeves (later to become the "Father of Carrier Aviation"), who had a protective device for his head made out of mole skin to allow him to play in the 1893 Army–Navy Game after he was told by a Navy doctor that he must give up football or risk death from another kick in the head. Reeves went to a local shoemaker/blacksmith and had a crude leather helmet fabricated to protect his skull. Before the first helmet, Edgar Allan Poe III (grandnephew of the famous writer) developed a small leather nose protector which, however, was found to severely interfere with vision and breathing and to come off easily

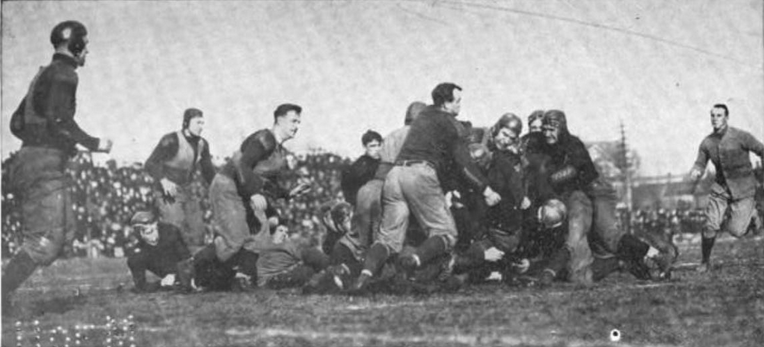
In the early 20th century, some players wore helmets but they were not mandatory.

Later helmets were made of padded leather, and resembled aviators' helmets. The helmet slowly began to take more of the appearance we recognize today when around 1917 more padding and flaps were added with ear holes for better on-field communication. Painted helmets have been around almost as long as helmets themselves: used to show team spirit and to help the quarterback distinguish a down field receiver from the defenders. The helmets of the University of Michigan Wolverines bear logos that follow the original seams of the winged leather helmets. Professional team logos started in 1948 when Fred Gehrke, a halfback for the Los Angeles Rams, began painting a horn design on all of the Rams' helmets. Gehrke studied art at the University of Utah.

The next innovation came probably in 1917 in the form of suspension: to "cradle" the skull away from the foam shell. Straps of fabric formed a pattern inside the helmet. They absorbed and distributed the impact better, and they allowed for ventilation. It was a breakthrough. They were first known as "ZH" or Zuppke helmets named after the Illinois coach who came up with the design. Rawlings and Spalding were some of the first manufacturers.

The first person to design a bar face mask on a football helmet was Vern McMillan, the owner of a sporting goods store in Terre Haute, Indiana. It was a rubber-covered wire mask on a leather helmet. This kind was used in the mid-1930s.

== Plastic helmets ==
The first plastic football helmet came in 1940. It was invented and patented by John T. Riddell and his son John T. Riddell Jr., of the John T. Riddell Company in Chicago, a sporting goods provider. The single molded shell was stronger, lighter, longer-lasting, and did not rot the way leather does when damp. Colors could also be baked into the plastic so the paint jobs would be longer-lasting. In 1940 Riddell also developed the first chin strap to rest on the chin instead of the neck and the first plastic face mask.

There were problems however. The plastic helmets were brittle when hit head on, and the bar hole that was drilled for the face mask tended to pop loose. Because of this Riddell was in trouble and so was the plastic helmet. Riddell's plastic helmet was a little flat on top at first but it changed to its tear-drop shape, which allowed a blow to slide to one side or the other rather than be met head-on. Its web suspension could be raised or lowered to fit the head of a player.

In 1955, G.E. Morgan, a consultant to Riddell, and Paul Brown, the coach of the Cleveland Browns, invented the BT-5 face mask which is the single bar design. The year after the release of the BT-5, a single wave radio was invented by John Campbell and George Sarles, who approached then-Cleveland Browns owner Paul Brown to install a radio inside quarterback George Ratterman's helmet. It only resulted in game time interference, and was outlawed by then-NFL commissioner Bert Bell after only three preseason games. It wasn't until 38 years later in 1994, that the radio transmitter inside the quarterback's helmet was revisited.

In 1971, Morgan, now chairman of the board of Riddell received a patent for "Energy Absorbing and Sizing Means for Helmets." The result were the new HA-91 and HA-92 energy-absorbing, "microfit" helmets. They had valves on their crown to allow air to be pumped into vinyl cushions that were crammed into every space inside the helmet. The player put it on and then had it pumped up to fit firmly around the player's head. Sometimes fluid was also used. An anti-freeze solvent was used by some of the Green Bay Packers players to beat the cold weather of Lambeau Field in late-season games.

Sources are unsure as to who first designed air bladders for football helmets but Dr. Richard Schneider of the University of Michigan Hospital is reported to have believed that air was the most effective way to protect against blunt force. With this theory in mind, he invented an inflatable bladder for use inside a football helmet. The Michigan Wolverines Football team used a prototype and Schutt Sports hired Schneider and started mass-producing the AirTm Helmet in the early 1970s.

Many veteran players still preferred the old web suspended Riddell TK-2 because it was generally lighter and more breathable. Interior helmet pads were then developed that were lighter and did not need to be filled with air or fluid by both the Schutt and Riddell sports companies. And because of safety they were soon preferred by all positions.

In late 1976, because of concern for safety, four point chin straps were required in college ball. These kept the helmet firmly in place.

Space age rigid polycarbonate alloy plastic helmets and vinyl-coated steel alloy face masks became standards in the 1980s and 1990s.

In 2002, Riddell released a new more spherical design for the helmet called the Revolution (or Revo) and it is currently the most widely used helmet in the National Football League The Schutt counterpart is called the DNA Pro Adult Helmet. A study released by the University of Pittsburgh Medical Center shows that the Riddell Revolution, and others like it, reduce the incidences of concussion by 31%. Subsequently, a Senate Commerce Committee meeting on October 19, 2011, heard testimony from Jeffrey Kutcher, an associate professor of neurology at the University of Michigan and chair of the American Academy of Neurology's sports neurology section that "there is no significant data" in the UPMC study for Riddell to make the claim that the helmet reduced concussions by 31%. On or about May 2013, Mary K. Engle, the FTC's associate director for advertising practices wrote that the agency had concluded the UPMC study "did not prove that Revolution varsity football helmets reduce concussions or the risk of concussions by 35%". Riddell has since discontinued use of the 31% claim. Later, Riddell released the Revolution Speed helmet. Other notable Football helmets include the Riddell Speedflex Helmet, The Schutt F7, and The Vicis Pro V1
