= Revolution helmets =

Line of football helmets

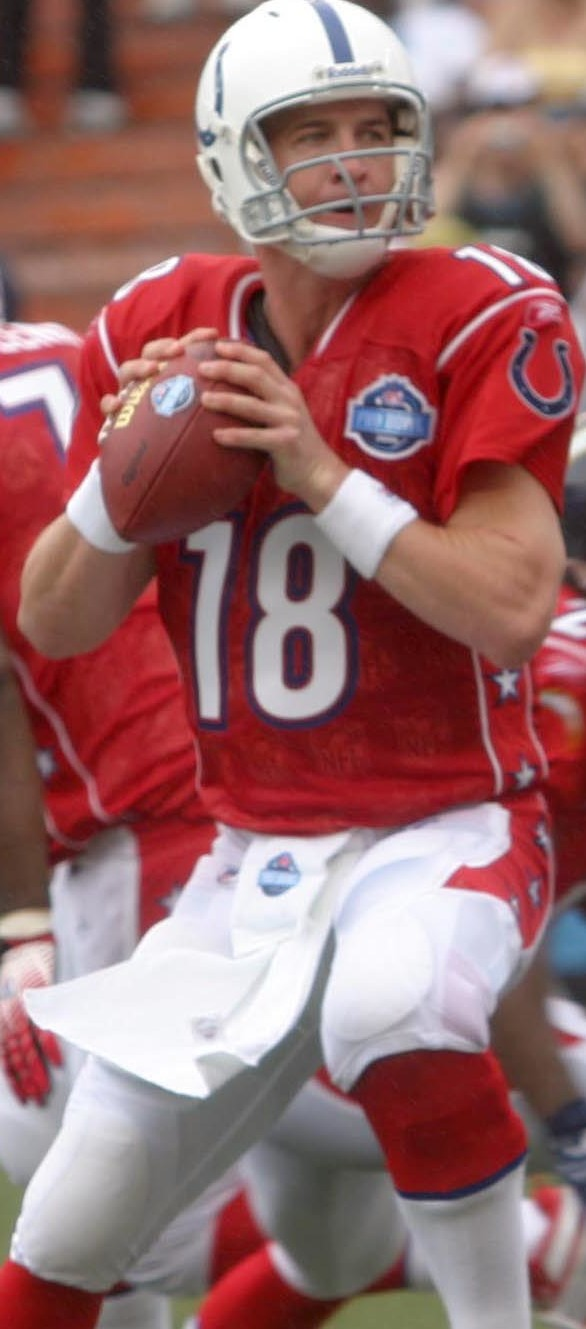
Quarterback Peyton Manning wearing a Revolution helmet in 2006. He switched to the model in 2002 to reduce the risk of head injury.

Revolution helmets are a line of football helmets produced by Riddell Sports Group. The helmet brand was the most popular model in use in the National Football League throughout the 2000s, with 83% of players wearing it in 2008. Newer models in the line like the Speedflex helmet come equipped with Riddell's HITS Technology, which consists of a sensor in the helmet that relays data regarding the severity of each hit to a computer system. The Speedflex also features a built-in hinged panel located on the front near the top. In head-on collisions, this panel gives by up to a quarter of an inch (6 mm), helping to absorb the impact.

The Revolution helmet was conceived in an attempt to reduce the risk of head injuries such as concussions. What research has been done on the helmet's efficacy so far has been inconclusive.

== History ==
The Revolution was first distributed in 2002. As of 2007, Riddell had sold 750,000 Revolution helmets.

The Revolution line was prohibited starting with the 2025 NFL season, one of four helmets from Riddell that were banned following the introduction of newer helmets. The Speedflex remained legal after two updated models were introduced, albeit tagged by the league as "not recommended".

== Revolution Speed Helmet ==
The Speed Helmet was designed around the head's center of gravity, and is intended to reduce the prevalence of concussions. Recent data has brought the issues of football concussions to the public attention. An estimated 5 percent of high school players suffer concussions each year, and there is a widening body of evidence suggesting that long-term football players to a type of brain damage called chronic traumatic encephalopathy. Since most concussion-causing impacts occur on the side of the head and face, the helmet features mandible extensions which the cover the wearer's jaw line. The helmet is lined with a custom fit cellular air pad system made of polyurethane and synthetic rubber foam, and the shell is made of a polycarbonate alloy. A lightweight titanium face guard is attached to the helmet.

=== HITS technology ===
The Revolution helmet can be mounted with Head Impact Telemetry Systems (HITS) technology, a microprocessor, a radio transmitter, and a system of six accelerometers placed inside the helmet which measure the force, location, and direction of an impact on the helmet. When a player's head accelerates due to a collision, the acceleration is registered and brought up on a computer as a three-dimensional image of the head with the location of contact marked with an arrow. A bar graph is used to indicate the force of the blow. While players and staff may be able to use this information in determining whether a player requires medical attention, there is currently no medically conclusive method of determining which impacts might lead to a concussion.

== Injury prevention research and controversy ==
One major study on the helmet's effectiveness (funded by Riddell) was conducted by the University of Pittsburgh Medical Center. The research compared the Revolution helmet with other models. 2,000 high school players participated in the study which took place over the course of three years. The study's results showed that 5.4% of the athletes wearing the Revolution helmet suffered a concussion during a game as opposed to 7.6% of the players wearing the older model helmets. High school players wearing the Revolution helmet were 31% less likely to experience a concussion. The University of Pittsburgh Medical Center later disavowed these results, citing problems with the design of the study, according to the book League of Denial. The Federal Trade Commission also conducted an independent investigation into the safety claims made by Riddell. It concluded that "the study did not substantiate Riddell’s claim that Revolution varsity football helmets reduce concussions or the risk of concussion by 31% compared to other varsity football helmets." It also invalidated all claims relating to youth football and the Revolution youth helmet due to the fact that the UPMC study tested neither youth players nor the youth version of the helmet. Despite determining that Riddell falsely represented numerous claims, the FTC chose not to sanction Riddell as the company had already discontinued use of the 31% claim.
