= Riddell Sports Group =

American football equipment company

Riddell Sports Group, Inc.
- Type: Private Company
- Industry: Sports equipment
- Founded: 1929; 97 years ago
- Founder: John Tate Riddell
- Headquarters: Rosemont, Illinois, United States
- Area served: Worldwide
- Key people: Alison Borsema (CEO)
- Products: Protective equipment (helmets, shoulder pads, face masks); Apparel
- Owner: Fenway Partners
- Website: riddell.com

Riddell Sports Group, commonly known as Riddell (/rəˈdɛl/ rə-DEL), is an American company specializing in sports equipment for Gridiron football. Founded in 1929 by John Tate Riddell, it was headquartered in Rosemont, Illinois, but in 2017, the company relocated to a new facility in Des Plaines, Illinois.

== History ==
The company was founded by John Tate Riddell, who invented the removable cleat. Riddell specialized in cleats until 1939, when John Tate Riddell invented the plastic shell helmet. This was followed by the invention of the plastic suspension helmet in the early 1940s, which was used by the United States Military during the Second World War. Throughout the latter half of the 20th century, the company introduced new helmet technologies, such as facemasks in the 1950s, air-filled padding in the 1960s, and helmets with multiple inflation points in the 1990s. Following the success of helmets designed to reduce concussions in addition to skull injuries, Dan Arment was appointed president of Riddell in 2008. Arment previously worked as executive vice-president and general manager of mass-market business. Riddell is owned by private equity firm Fenway Partners. Fenway acquired the company in 2003 from Lincolnshire Management. In 2008, Riddell sued competitor Schutt Sports. Two years later, Schutt filed a lawsuit, also for patent-infringement, against Riddell. Riddell won, leading to Schutt filing for bankruptcy.

== Products ==
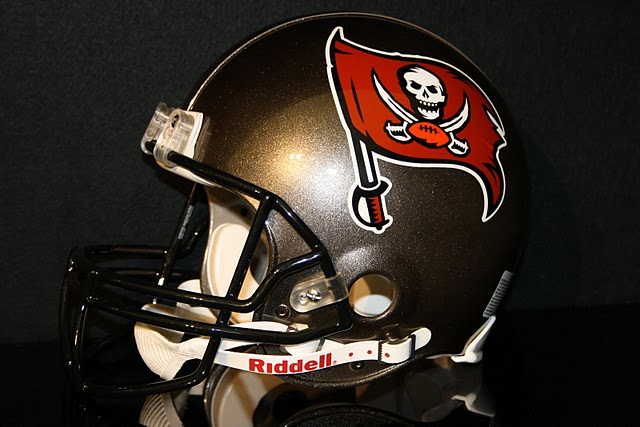
Riddell football equipment: (left): Tampa Bay Buccaneers helmet, (right) shoulder pads

Riddell is widely known for its line of football helmets. In 2002, Riddell released a new helmet design called the Revolution, commonly known as the Revo. The Revolution was released in response to a study on concussions and became popular in the NFL and NCAA, being used by notable athletes such as Peyton Manning and Brady Quinn.

Riddell is also known for the Revolution IQ HITS (Head Impact Telemetry System). Sensors are placed inside the helmet that store data from each impact, and can be transferred to a laptop to be reviewed by coaching staff or physicians. Riddell has continued to develop helmet technologies, such as the Concussion Reduction Technology (CRT) system. This system features strategically placed paddings and liners designed to absorb and disperse impact forces, reducing the risk of concussions.

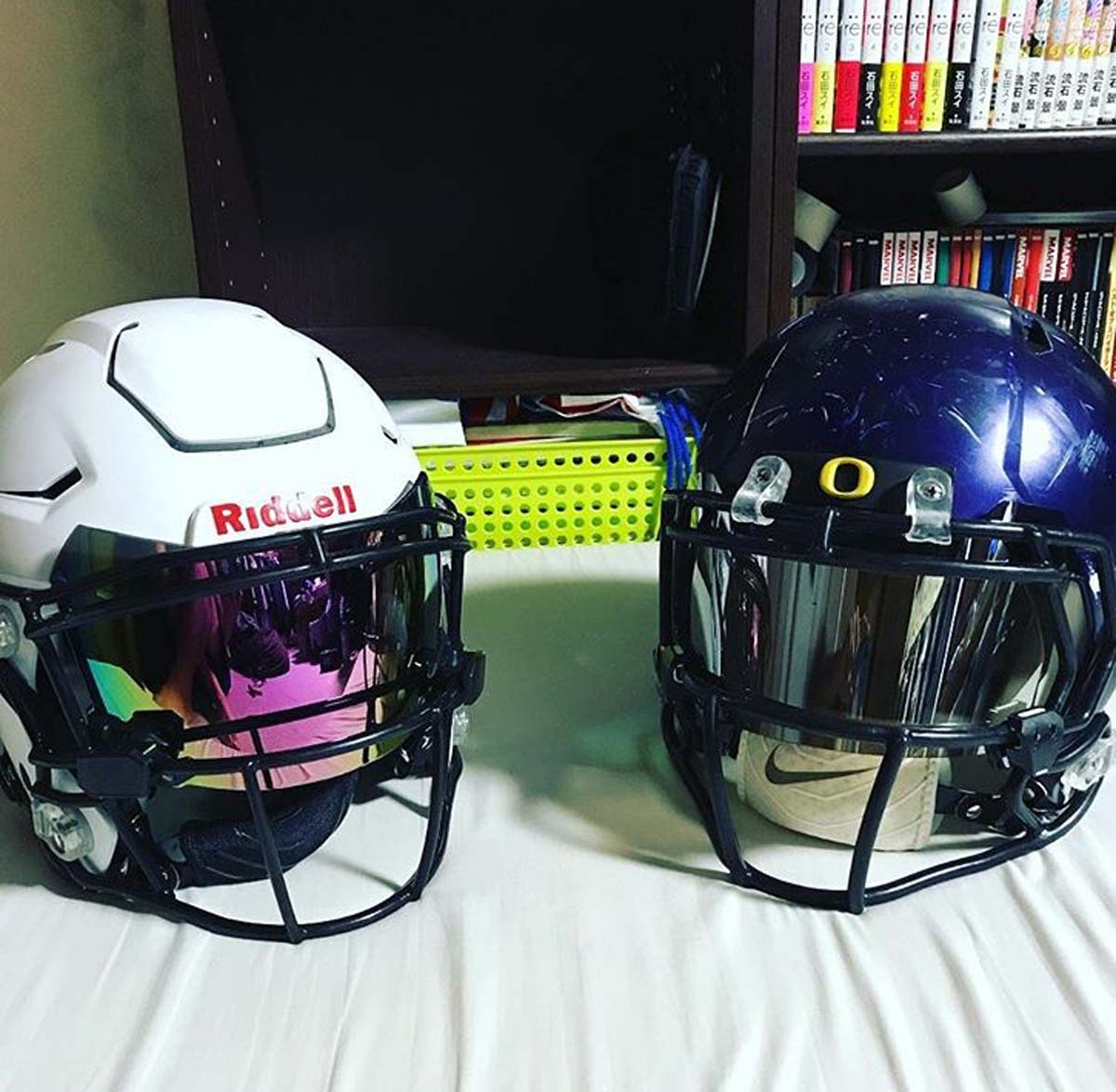
(Left) Riddell Speedflex, (Right) Riddell Speed

Other helmet styles produced by Riddell include the Revolution Speed and the SpeedFlex. The SpeedFlex features a flexible shell and facemask, offering improved protection and impact absorption. The design disperses forces more efficiently, reducing the risk of head and neck injuries. The company also produces a youth line of helmets, which are versions of the adult helmets designed for athletes younger than 14.

== Lawsuits ==
Concussion litigation against Riddell often revolves around claims that the company knew about the risks associated with their helmets but failed to properly warn athletes and teams. Plaintiffs argue that Riddell's helmets did not provide sufficient protection or effectively mitigate the risk of concussions, leading to long-term brain injuries and health complications. A jury in the 2013 case ruled that Riddell was negligent in not warning people about concussion dangers when wearing its helmets. The exact verdict in favor of Mr. Ridolfi was on his claims for negligent failure to warn. Attorney Franklin D. Azar, who represented plaintiffs in the Colorado case, predicted that the $11 million verdict awarded in the 2013 trial could have implications for the larger suit by NFL players. Because Riddell knew in November 2000 of problems in testing of the helmets but did not disclose the information. Azar asserted that the verdict shows that there is no statute of limitations on traumatic brain injuries when manufacturers do not adequately warn of defects. The ruling came as Riddell faced a similar suit in California, as well as a complaint by thousands of NFL players.

One significant legal case involving Riddell was the multidistrict litigation (MDL) brought by former National Football League players. In 2011, thousands of retired NFL players sued the league, alleging that they suffered long-term brain injuries as a result of concussions sustained during their careers. In this MDL, Riddell faced claims that they failed to disclose the long-term risks of concussions to players and that their helmets did not adequately protect against head injuries. Riddell was named as a defendant in this litigation due to their role as the official helmet provider for the NFL.

Riddell has been sued by multiple NFL players. More than 125 former NFL players sued the league and helmet-maker Riddell for not disclosing and, in some instances, allegedly hiding the risks of repeated head injuries. There are "at least three" personal injury cases pending in California and one more in Pennsylvania. According to the AP, the cases represent the "first examples of former players joining together to file concussion-related lawsuits against the NFL."

== See also ==
- Schutt Sports
