= Schutt Sports =

American Manufacturer

Schutt Sports, LLC.
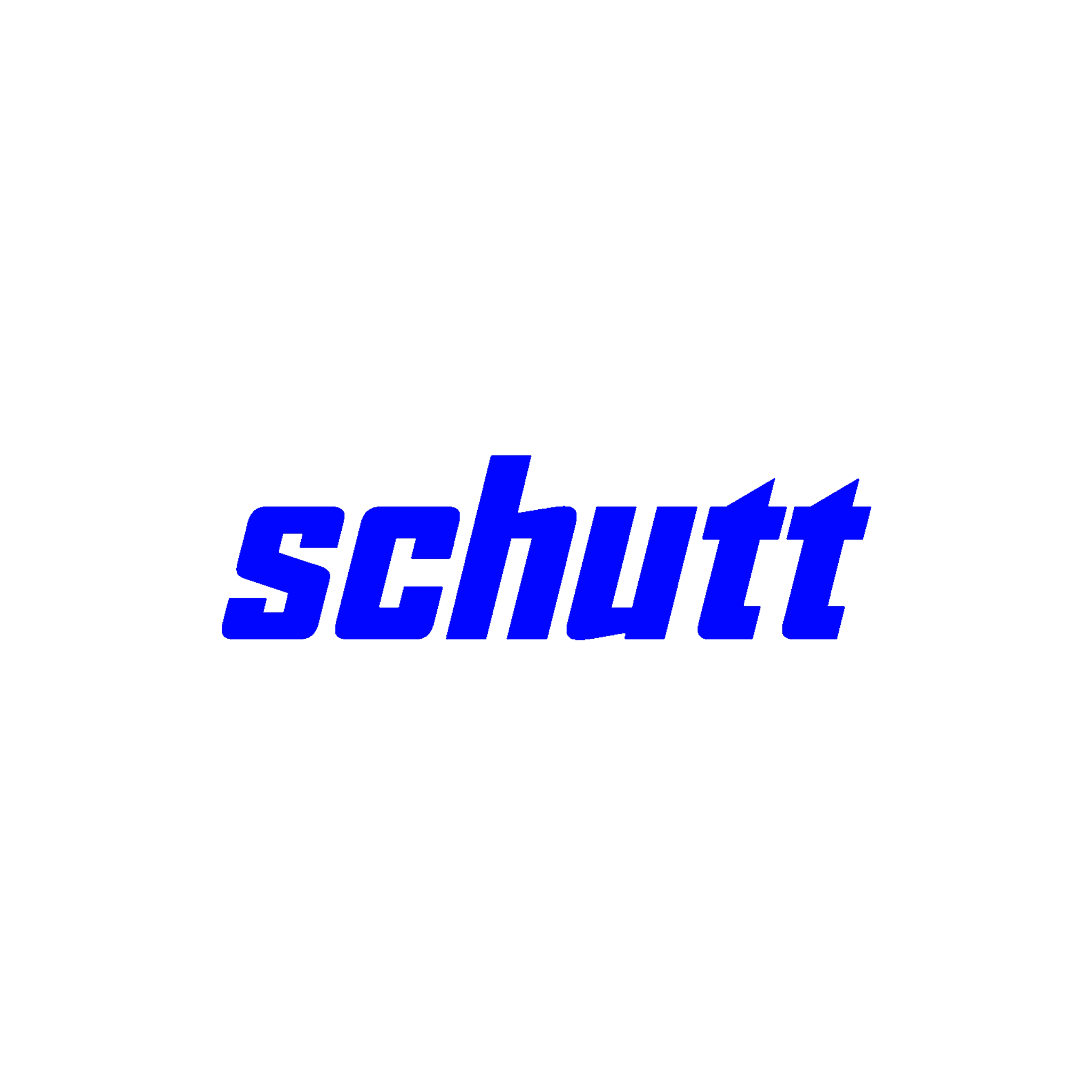
- Type: Private
- Industry: Sports equipment
- Founded: 1918
- Headquarters: Plainfield, IN, U.S.
- Area served: Global
- Products: Football, shoulder pads, sportswear
- Owner: Innovatus Capital Partners
- Parent: Certor Sports
- Website: schuttsports.com

Schutt Sports (a brand of Certor Sports) is an American company that manufactures protective gear for American football. Products manufactured by Schutt, headquartered in Plainfield, Indiana, includes helmets and other protective products such as shoulder pads. Schutt is known for its F7 helmet, which can be seen at or near the top of NFL and Virginia Tech helmet ratings.

Established in 1918 as a basketball equipment manufacturer, during its existence Schutt signed agreements with sports leagues such as Major League Baseball and American Amateur Baseball Congress in the 2010s. The COVID-19 pandemic affected the company's operations severely, causing it to file for bankruptcy in December 2020. Shortly after, Schutt, along with football sister brand VICIS, were bought and revived by Innovatus Capital Partners. Within a year, the company was moved to Plainfield, Indiana in October 2021, where it still maintains operations.

== History ==
The company was established in 1918 as a basketball hoop and dry line developer. It created the first football faceguard in 1935. In 2008, competitor Riddell sued Schutt for infringing on three patents. The three products identified were branded by Schutt under the names "DNA", "ION", and "AIR XP". Two years later, the company sued Riddell, also for patent-infringement. However, Schutt ended up losing in the lawsuit, forcing them to file bankruptcy. Despite this, football helmets and facemask sales in 2011 increased by 15%. After the bankruptcy, Platinum Equity acquired the assets of the company in September 2018. In December 2020, it was announced that Innovatus Capital Partners had acquired the assets of Kranos Corporation including its brands Schutt, ProGear Shoulder Pads, Tucci Bats, Hollywood Bases and Adams USA.

While Schutt was able to emerge from its initial bankruptcy filing and secure new business, such as a 2018 deal with Major League Baseball to supply bases, home plates and pitching rubbers, the company was not able to withstand the damage to its business wrought by the COVID-19 pandemic. On December 18, 2020, Kranos Corporation, which had done business as Schutt Sports, filed for Chapter 7 liquidation. In the petition filed with the court, the company listed $1,219,773 in assets and $58,342,153 in liabilities; as noted by SGI News, the assets consisted entirely of Zamst inventory, a line of sports braces and related sports medicine products that Schutt agreed to distribute exclusively under a multi-year contract with Nippon Sigmax.

Five days after Schutt filed for bankruptcy, it was purchased and revived by Innovatus Capital Partners on December 23, 2020. This put Schutt and all of its brands with the VICIS brand under the newly named Certor Sports brand. Certor Sports, now the parent company of Schutt, VICIS, and TUCCI, relocated the company's headquarters to Plainfield, IN in October 2021. After Schutt was revived, it focused only on on-field football helmets and equipment, ending its baseball, softball, and collectibles business. Schutt baseball and softball gear are now under the Certor Sports' TUCCI brand.

Following success with the original F7 football helmet, Schutt released the F7 LTD and F7 VTD. This was a popular choice amongst NFL players, including Tyreek Hill, Travis Kelce, and Khalil Mack.

After Schutt was brought under Certor Sports with VICIS, the company released the F7 2.0 in January 2023, which had the same shell as prior F7 models from the previous ownership, but an entirely redesigned internal padding and impact protection system. The F7 2.0 became the latest Schutt helmet to receive a Virginia Tech 5-Star Rating, and it maintained its 5-Star rating after Virginia Tech made its rating system much stricter in 2025.

In 2025, Schutt launched the F7 Pro and F7 AiR to extreme success at the NFL, making it the fastest-adopted helmet in NFL history. Notable players to switch into the F7 Pro during the 2025 NFL season from a Riddell model were Jahmyr Gibbs, CeeDee Lamb, and Lane Johnson. Additionally, players who wore older F7 models switched into the F7 Pro, including Drake Maye, Ja'Marr Chase, and Patrick Surtain.

The F7 AiR boasts the same look as the NFL's F7 Pro, but has impact absorption technology most commonly seen at youth and high school football games. Just like the F7 2.0, the F7 AiR also earned a 5-Star rating from Virginia Tech's third-party testing lab.

== Concussion prevention ==
Schutt has been active in developing equipment to prevent concussions in American football, including creating a device in 2008 for Arena Football League players called the "Shockometer". The device is shaped like a triangle, with an adhesive on one side, that sticks to the helmet. When a player is hit by a g-force of more than 100 g, a light in a capsule on the device will flash red. However, fan activity could potentially affect the device as well as calibration Issues. Proper calibration is essential for accurate g-force measurement. If the sensors are not calibrated correctly or if the calibration process is not performed regularly, it can lead to faulty measurements.

In 2012, the company developed a helmet line called "Vengeance", which the company stated will give players "the opportunity to face their foes head-on." Critics and doctors questioned the model's marketing, saying that the statement, as well as the name, can give the wrong message. However, Schutt CEO Robert Erb stated that the name stems from the competition between Schutt and Riddell, and that the name will not appear on the helmet.

Modern football helmets incorporate several features to reduce the risk of concussions. These include improved padding systems, shock-absorbing materials, and enhanced helmet shells. The padding inside the helmet is designed to mitigate the force of impacts and reduce the acceleration experienced by the brain during a collision. Helmets are crucial in minimizing the risk of head injuries, but they cannot completely eliminate the possibility of concussions. Football remains a contact sport with inherent risks. Therefore, it is essential to complement helmet technology with proper tackling techniques, rule changes, and comprehensive concussion protocols to ensure player safety.

Schutt's F7 AiR helmet allows for superior impact absorption compared to prior Schutt helmet models or Riddell helmet models by utilizing TPU-based buckling columns and a "Tektonic mohawk" on the helmet's shell that moves independently from the rest of the helmet. Additionally, the F7 AiR was the first helmet to feature an onboard air pump, allowing the athletes to fine-tune the helmet's fit, comfort, and protection without the need for a handheld pump.

In January 2025, Certor Sports, parent company of Schutt and VICIS, announced a partnership with Guardian Sports, the manufacturer of the Guardian Cap. Schutt and VICIS are the preferred helmet brands of Guardian Cap.

WARNING

Keep your head up. Do not butt, ram, spear or strike an opponent with any part of the helmet or faceguard. This is a violation of football rules and may cause you to suffer severe brain or neck injury, including paralysis or death and possible injury to your opponent. Contact in football may result in Concussion/Brain Injury which no helmet can prevent. Symptoms include loss of consciousness or memory, dizziness, headache, nausea or confusion. If you have symptoms, immediately stop and report them to your coach, trainer and parents. Do not return to a game or contact until all symptoms are gone and you receive medical clearance. Ignoring this warning may lead to another and more serious or fatal brain injury.

— Warning label on the back of Schutt-developed football helmets

== Helmet technologies ==
Schutt employs Thermoplastic Urethane (TPU) cushioning in its helmets. TPU is a resilient material that offers excellent impact absorption and durability, providing enhanced protection against collisions. They also utilize the SUREFIT Air Liner which is a customizable helmet liner system that utilizes inflatable air bladders. It allows players to adjust the fit of the helmet, ensuring a secure and comfortable fit while minimizing movement and potential injury. Additionally, Schutt integrates D3O, a smart material, into key impact zones of their helmets. D3O is a flexible material that instantly hardens upon impact, dissipating and managing the forces exerted during collisions, thereby reducing the risk of injury.

Another very important piece of technology Schutt uses is the Tectonic Plate 3DX Technology. Schutt's Tectonic Plate 3DX technology involves incorporating a multi-layered system in the helmet shell. This design allows for controlled and efficient energy transfer upon impact, providing improved protection against rotational forces and also reducing the risk of concussions.

== Sponsorships ==
The company's basketball equipment was used by various athletic associations; Schutt's rims were the official rims of the SEC men's and women's basketball tournaments. The company was also sponsor of the Illinois High School Association Schutt Sports Slam Dunk Spectacular dunk contest. The Philadelphia 76ers frequently used Schutt's equipment during their summer camps, and was the preferred equipment of the Missouri Valley Conference. Schutts also developed equipment for the United States men's national softball team/women's softball teams, and developed the Aqua Tech helmet in 2012 for the women's team.

Starting with the 2024 NFL Season, Schutt and VICIS became the official helmet sponsor of the Indianapolis Colts. This partnership included a Certor Sports presence at Colts Training Camp, Colts home games, and Colts "Friday Night Lights" high school football events.

In January 2025, Certor Sports, parent company of Schutt and VICIS, announced a partnership with Guardian Sports, the manufacturer of the Guardian Cap. Schutt and VICIS are the preferred helmet brands of Guardian Cap.

== See also ==
- Riddell Sports Group
