= Frank Azar =

American Personal injury lawyer

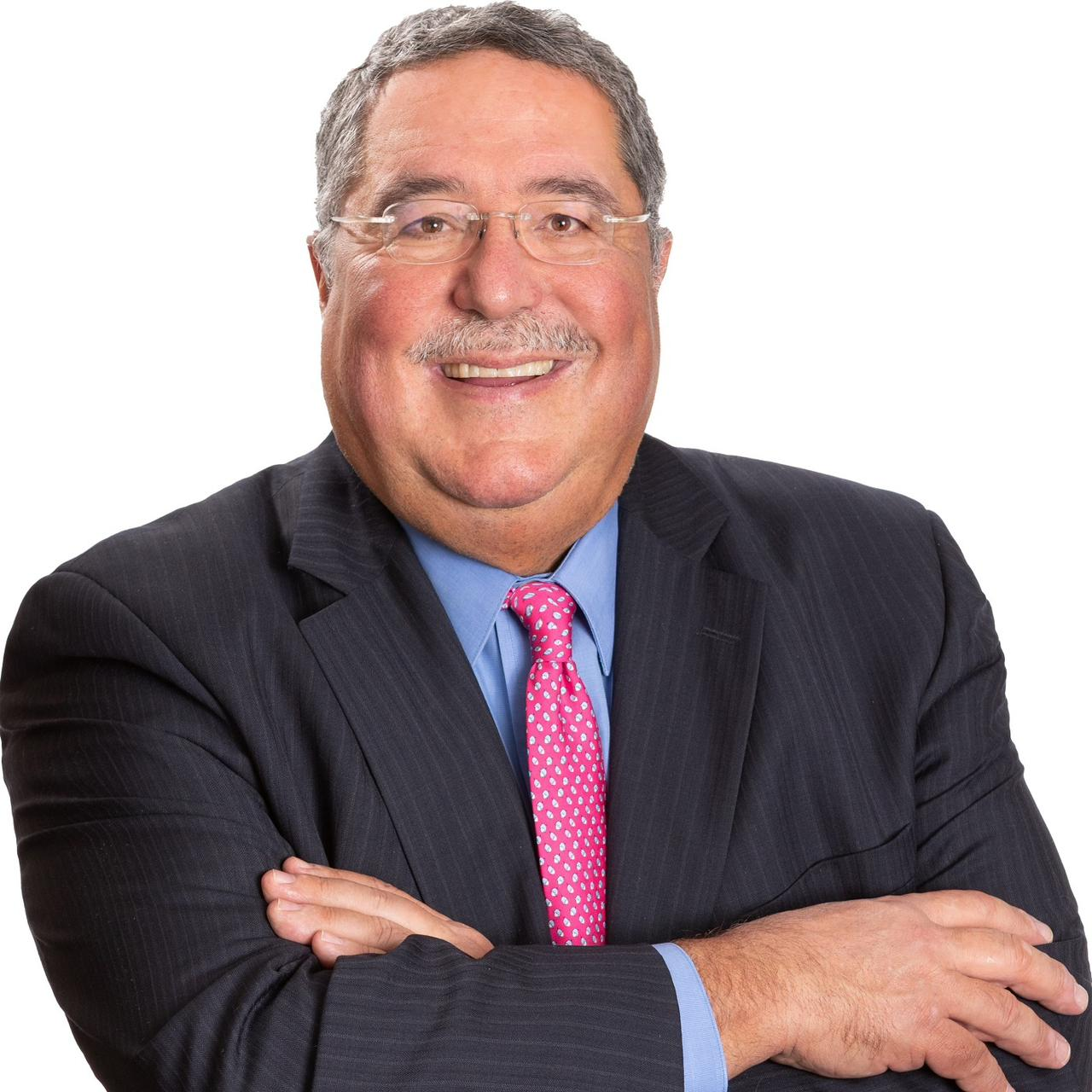
- Azar in 2022
- Born: 18 April 1957 (age 69); Pueblo, Colorado, U.S.
- Education: University of Colorado; University of Denver (JD)
- Occupation: Personal injury lawyer
- Known for: Founder and President of Franklin D. Azar & Associates P.C
- Website: www.fdazar.com/attorneys/franklin-d-azar/

Franklin David Azar (born April 18, 1957) is an American attorney based in the U.S. state of Colorado.

== Early life and education ==
Azar was born in Pueblo, Colorado, and grew up in Trinidad, Colorado. He obtained his bachelor's degree in political science from the University of Colorado Boulder in 1979 and his Juris Doctor from the University of Denver in 1982.

== Career ==
Azar began his legal career serving as the assistant district attorney for the Third Judicial District. In 1987, he established Franklin D. Azar & Associates, P.C, a personal injury law firm based in Colorado.

Azar has litigated and won multiple high profile cases, including defective product and injury cases against Walmart, Meta Platforms, Riddell Sports, and others. He also assisted with Virgie Arthur's legal battles concerning her daughter, former Playboy Playmate Anna Nicole Smith.

In 2024, Azar was appointed to the Plaintiffs’ Steering Committee (PSC) for the Multi-District litigation (MDL) involving DePuy’s faulty Pinnacle hip implants in recognition of his significant contributions to the legal field.

== Philanthropy ==
In 2014, Azar set up a scholarship fund at Trinidad, Colorado, to promote education in his home community. His annual golf tournament, the Azar Invitational, provides academic scholarships to local youths.
