= Protective equipment in gridiron football =

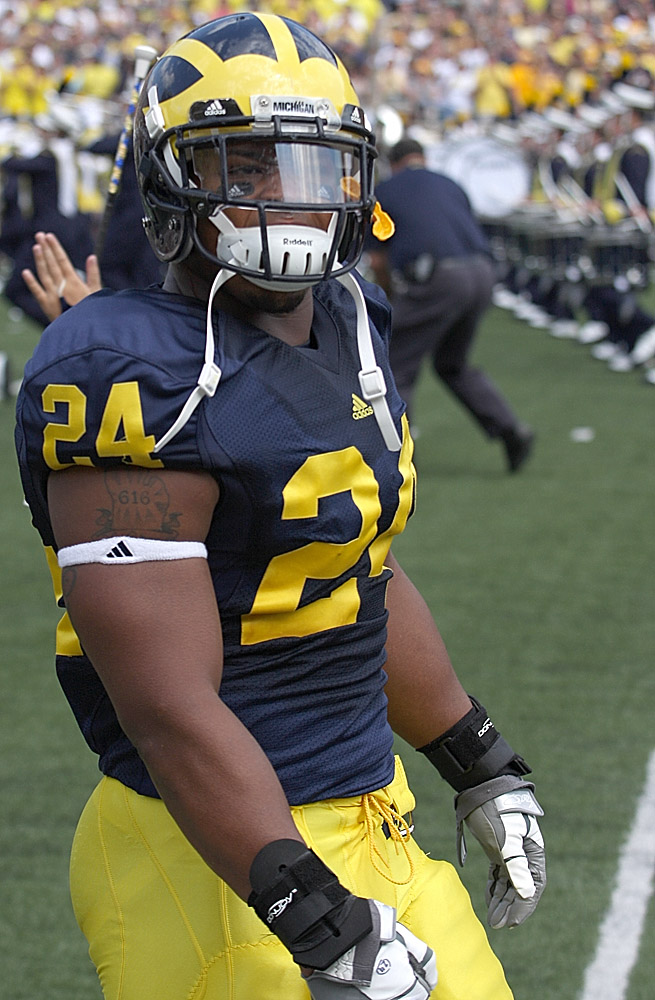
Kevin Grady wearing a winged football helmet with a clear visor and a mouthguard

Gridiron football players wear various pieces of equipment for the protection of the body during the course of a football game. Basic equipment worn by most football players include a helmet, shoulder pads, gloves, shoes, and thigh and knee pads, a mouthguard, and a jockstrap or compression shorts with or without a protective cup. Neck rolls, elbow pads, hip pads, tailbone pads, rib pads, and other equipment may be worn in addition to the aforementioned basics. Football protective equipment is made of synthetic materials: foam rubbers, elastics, and durable, shock-resistant, molded plastic. Football protective equipment has remained consistent in use for decades with some slight modifications made over the years in design and materials. The assignment and maintenance of football gear belongs to the team equipment manager.

== Helmet ==
American football helmet

A professional football helmet consists of several distinct parts: the shell, jaw pads and abdomen bladders, face mask, chin strap, and mouth guard. The shell is constructed of hard plastic with thick padding on the inside, a face mask made of two or more metal bars (usually two spaced far apart and a third close to the middle), and a chinstrap used to secure the helmet. Helmets are a requirement at all levels of organized football, except for non-tackle variations such as flag football. Although they are protective, players can and do still suffer head injuries such as concussion. Football helmets bear the logo of the team and the team colors. By the mid-1980s, the football helmet had become a complex, highly engineered piece of equipment. The inside of the helmets was lined with foam padding and plastic pods, or an inflatable layer designed to absorb the shock of impact and create as tight as fit as possible. In 1995. the football helmet went high-tech, when a new rule permitted quarterbacks to have a radio transmitter in their helmets, making it possible for a team’s coach to call in plays without the need for elaborate sideline semaphore.

There are several styles of face masks and chin straps available. The selection is left to the player, with quarterbacks generally selecting more open masks with maximum visibility. Each position has a different type of face mask to balance protection and visibility. There are at least 15 different facemask styles. New design for the helmet includes an integrated faceguard featuring shock absorbing "Energy Wedges" that reduce the force of impacts to the faceguard.

A recent addition to the football helmet is a visor or eye shield, traditionally used to protect players from eye injuries or glare. Former Chicago Bears quarterback Jim McMahon was the first to wear a visor/shield. The visors started out as clear or smoked, but now come in colors ranging from blue, gold, black, rainbow, silver, or amber. The clear visor/shield is used at the player's discretion. The NFL requires medical clearance related to migraines and sun sensitivity for tinted, sunglass like, visors. An exception has been made for players with Oakley sponsorships: The company's light pink tinted "Prizm Shield" visors may be worn.

The helmet fitting process starts by measuring the player's head with calipers. Based on measurements taken, a helmet shell of the appropriate size and style is chosen. Then, padding is added to ensure that the helmet fits the player's head. Padding consists of both foam rubber pads and inflatable (air) pads. Both the top and side padding include inflatable bladders that customize the fit. Once the helmet is in place on the player's head, the inflator bulb is applied to two points on the outside of the helmet. The jaw pads are fitted to ensure that the lower part of the helmet is snug against the player's face. The helmets that most NFL teams use are remarkably light, and once the pads are in place, there is no movement or shifting on the player's head.

=== Radio ===
The first in-helmet radio transmitter was invented in 1956 by John Campbell and George Sarles, who approached then-Cleveland Browns owner Paul Brown to install a radio inside quarterback George Ratterman's helmet. It only resulted in game time interference, and was outlawed by then-NFL commissioner Bert Bell after only three preseason games. The NFL allowed dummy communication in regular-season games in 1994, 38 years after the Browns' experiment. Rather than coaches calling a time-out in order to give a play to a quarterback, many of today's teams have opted for radios inside their quarterback's helmet. The helmets are set up with a small speaker in each ear hole. Quarterback coaches or offensive coordinators on the sidelines talk to the quarterback with a radio, giving him specific plays and options. Players from the "old school" might argue that this creates an unfair advantage, but proponents say that the radio helmets make for clear coach-to-player communication, even in large, noisy games like the Super Bowl.

NFL rules state that all helmets with a headset in them must have a visible green dot on the back. Since only the quarterback can have a wired helmet, it stops other players using the quarterback's helmet. A few times in 2006 the holder on the field goal attempt was told to pull up and throw or run at the last second because of a change the coaches saw on the field. This gave teams an "unfair advantage" in the eyes of the NFL. The new rules let each team know who is wearing a headset and who is hearing the plays being called.

In 2008 the NFL changed the rules to allow one player for the defense, usually a linebacker, but sometimes a defensive back, to wear a radio helmet with a green dot.

In 2024 the NCAA updated rules to allow one player on the offense and one player on the defense to wear a radio helmet, following rules similar to the NFL's with one major exemption, the radio is cut off when there are 15 seconds remaining on the play clock or when the ball is snapped, whichever comes first. The radio is not re-enabled until the end of that play.

There are limitations to the radio helmet though since it can be distracting for players who are not used to them. Additionally helmets with speakers are generally more expensive than traditional helmets, and they require additional maintenance and care to ensure that the speakers and microphone are working properly.

== Shoulder pads ==
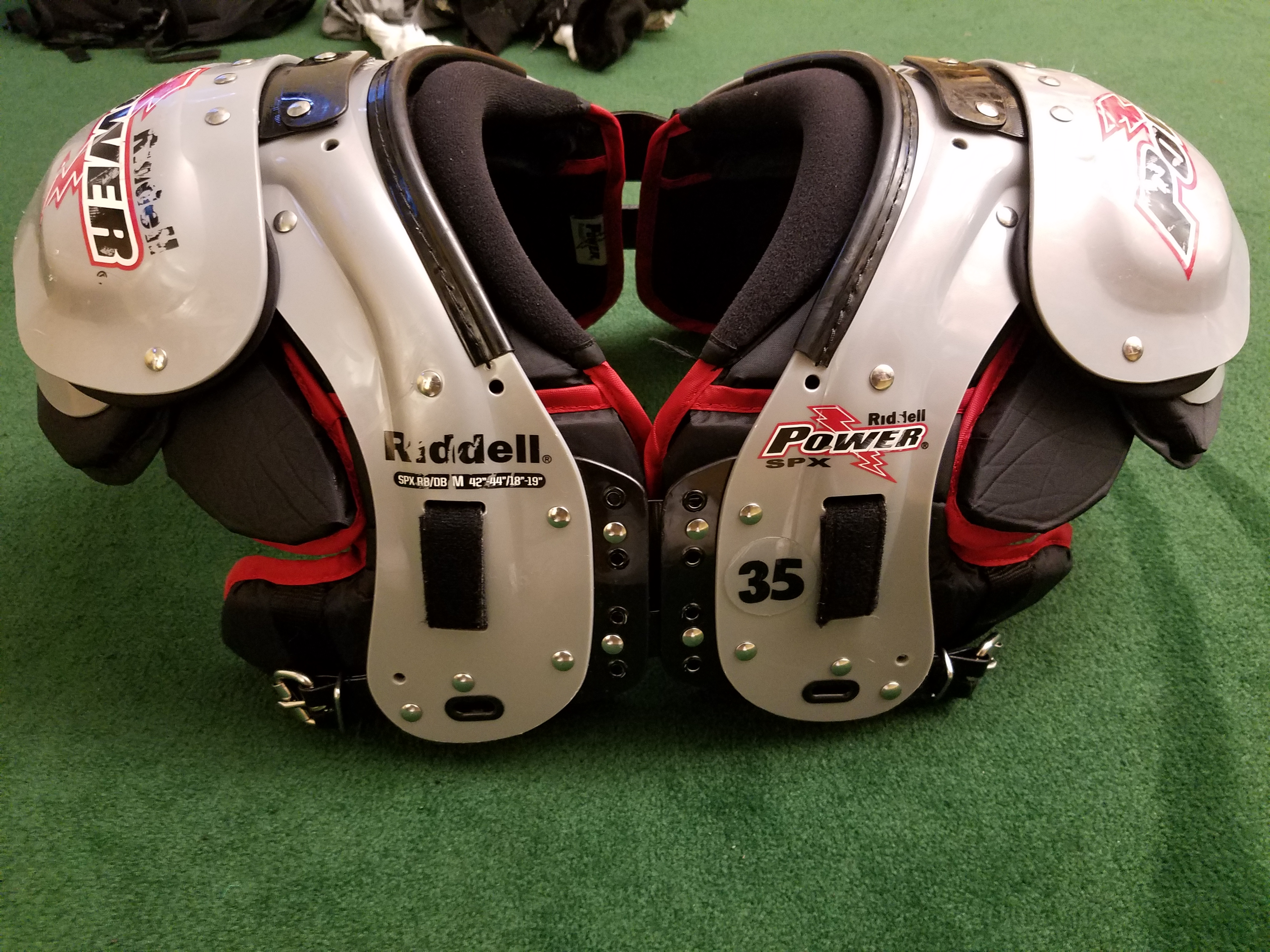
Shoulder pads

The shoulder pads consist of a hard plastic outer shell with shock-absorbing foam padding underneath. The pads fit over the shoulders and the chest and rib area, and are secured with various snaps and buckles. Shoulder pads give football players their typical "broad-shouldered" look, and are fitted to an adult player by measuring across the player's back from shoulder blade to shoulder blade with a soft cloth measuring tape and then adding 1/2 inch. For comfort, shoulder pads are sometimes worn in conjunction with a shoulder pads cushion of foam rubber over a cotton half-tee.

Shoulder pads accomplish two things for a football player: (1) they absorb some of the shock of impact through deformation. The pads at the shoulders are strung on tight webbing and deform on impact, and (2) they distribute the shock through a larger pad that is designed to regulate players' body temperatures during games and practices and also protects against injury.

== Jockstrap, or athletic supporter ==
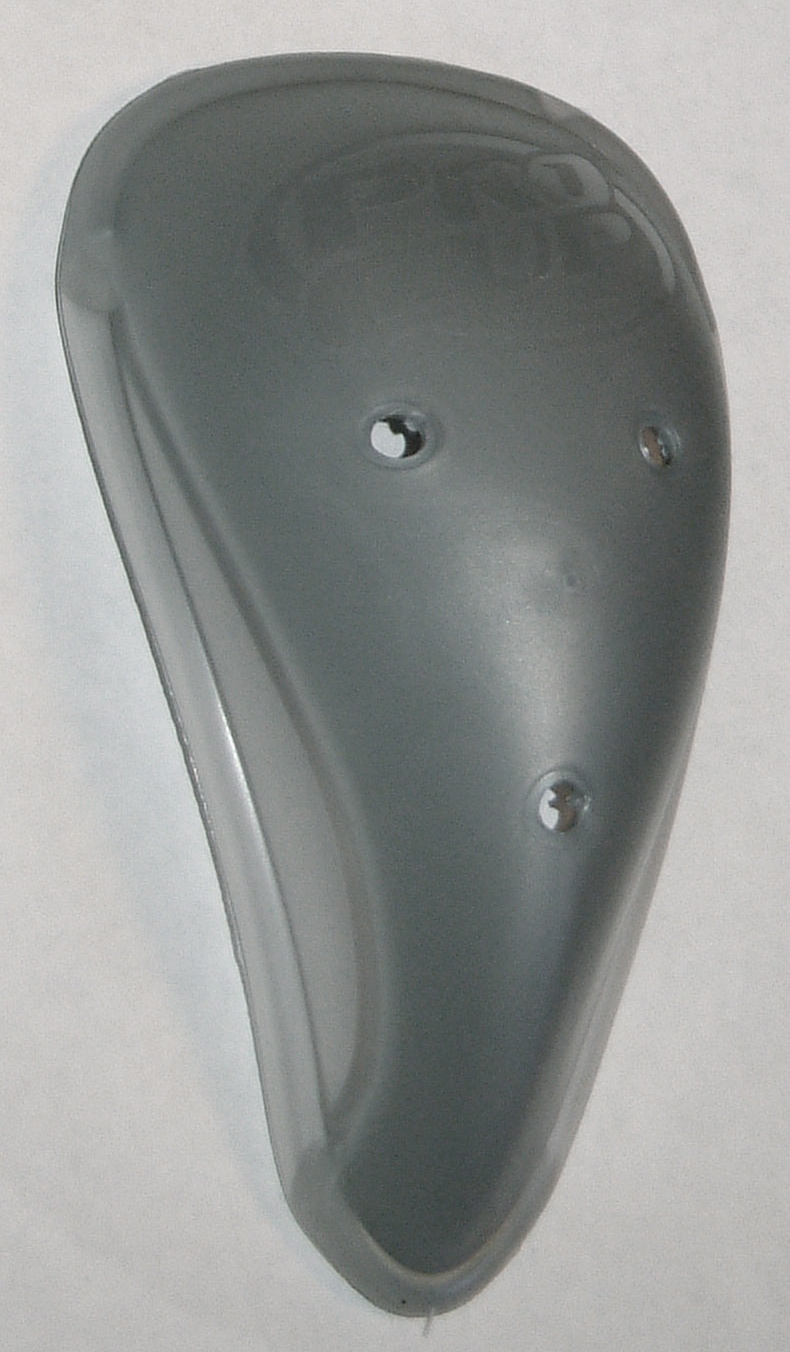
Protective cup

A typical jockstrap used in football is constructed of a wide elastic waistband with a support pouch of cotton/elastic to contain the genitals. Two wide elastic straps affixed to the base of the pouch and to the left and right sides of the waistband at the hip complete the jock. The pouch, in some varieties, may be fitted with a pocket to hold an impact resistant cup (protective cup) to protect the testicles and penis from injury. Many youth football players, such as the Pop Warner leagues, are often required to wear a protective cup. However, they are now not worn as often at the high school, college, and peewee level, although still highly recommended. The jockstrap is the one piece of equipment used in football that predates the sport itself. In 1874, Charles Bennett of the Chicago sporting goods company, Sharp & Smith, created the "bicycle jockey strap" for bicycle riders (or, bicycle jockeys as they were then known). Other athletes adopted the jockey strap in their sports. A mass marketing in 1902 claimed the garment, now termed a "small comforter" was "medically installed" for all males that engaged in sports or harmful activity.

== Jerseys and pants ==
The main purpose of these two garments is to identify the player by name and number, and by his team colors.

Jerseys. The front and back of the jersey are usually nylon, with spandex side panels to keep it taut. The goal is to make it difficult for an opposing player to grab hold of the jersey and use it for leverage. To help this process: Jerseys have an extension at the bottom that wraps around from front to back to keep the jersey tucked in. Jerseys have a wide strip of Velcro at the rear that mates with Velcro inside the waistband of the pants. Many players apply two-sided carpet tape to their shoulder pads so that the jersey sticks to the pads. The players individually choose which of these features (if any) they will use. Each professional football player is usually equipped with a set of practice jerseys as well as four-game jerseys. Players will change jerseys at half time if it is raining. Jerseys will usually have a variety of patches affixed to the shoulders or other parts of the garment. Patches may depict the American flag, the team logo, or other significant information.

Pants. Pants are manufactured in nylon and mesh (for hot weather practices), and nylon and spandex for a tight fit (with team colors) for games. Most pants are manufactured with the traditional lace-up fly as a zippered fly is impractical and subject to damage due to stress in the rough and tumble of the game. The interior sides of the pants legs contain four individual pockets to hold two thigh pads (one for each leg) and two knee pads. The pads are placed in the pockets before the pants are put on in the locker room. The pants are secured with a belt, sometimes with a traditional metal buckle or with several rings. Game-used jerseys and pants are sports collectibles, with those of celebrity athletes realizing high sums.

== Footwear ==
Similar to soccer cleats, gridiron football shoewear have soles that consist of spikes called "cleats" purposefully designed for games on grass. Some cleats have removable cleats that can be screwed into specific holes. Cleat sizes are changed, depending on the conditions of the field (longer cleats provide better traction on a wet field, shorter cleats provide greater speed on a dry field). Flat bottomed shoes, called "turf shoes," are worn on artificial turf (specifically AstroTurf due to the lack of soil that causes friction and grip in artificial fields.

== Other ==
Early protective equipment worn by members of the 1902 Oregon Agricultural football team.

=== Hip, tail, thigh, and knee pads ===
Quilted hip pads date to the 1890s and are one of the earliest pieces of protective football gear known. Today, hip and tailbone pads are made of plastic and protect the hips, pelvis, and coccyx or tailbone. The pads are inserted into the pockets of a girdle worn under the football pants. Thigh and knee pads are made of plastics and inserted into pockets constructed inside the football pants.

=== Nose guard ===
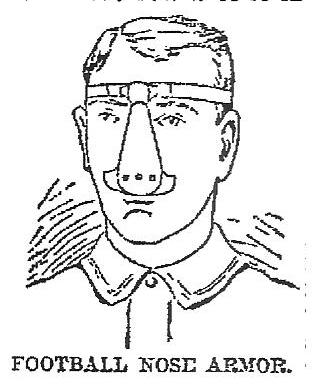
Football nose armor as depicted in The Daily Review (Decatur, Illinois) of December 4, 1892

In the days before helmets, players often wore nose guards or "nose masks" or "nose armor". Football was a brutal sport before the introduction of helmets and other protective gear. Serious injuries and even deaths were common occurrences in the game. Harvard's All-American center, John Cranston, was the first player to wear equipment to protect his face during an American football game. In order to protect Cranston's "weak nose," Harvard captain and 1889 All-American Arthur Cumnock invented a device that he called "nose armor." Cumnock's invention gained popularity, and in 1892, a newspaper article described the growing popularity of the device:

"By the invention of nose armor football players who have been hitherto barred from the field because of broken or weak noses are now able to thrust an armor protected nose (even though it be broken) into the center of the roughest scrimmage without danger to the sensitive nasal organ. The armor is made of fine rubber and protects both the nose and teeth."

Percy Langdon Wendell later invented the most commonly used version of the nose mask.

=== Gloves ===
Many receivers wear gloves that have sticky rubber palms, called tack gloves. Spray on sticky substances (such as Stick 'em) have been illegal since the 1980s. Linemen also wear gloves, for using their hands to fight off opposing linemen. The gloves worn by linemen usually are lined with very thick padding to better protect fingers and hands, which sometimes are caught in an opponent's face mask or are stepped on. Players are not permitted to put gels or "stick 'ems" on their gloves.

== Equipment management ==
The role of an equipment manager has become an important one for football teams. The equipment manager has two main areas of responsibility: first, fitting each player on the team with a customized array of equipment that will provide maximum protection against injury, and, secondly, being responsible for the logistics of handling many pieces of equipment on a daily basis—keeping it repaired and in stock, and moving the equipment for road games.
