= Guardian Cap =

Soft-shell pads on a football or hockey helmet

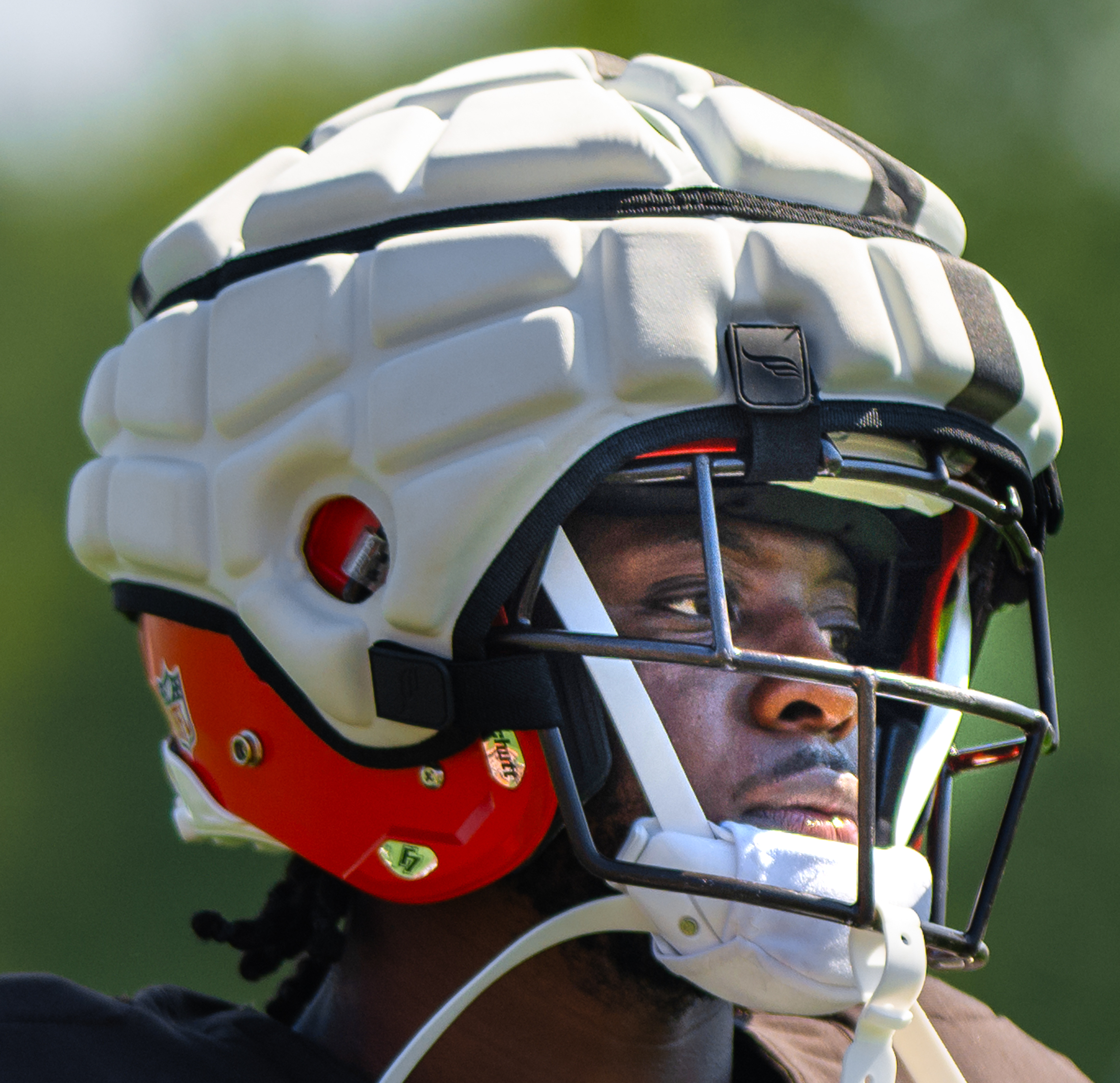
Hassan Hall wearing a Guardian Cap in 2023

A Guardian Cap is a line of soft-shell pads that attach to and cover the outside of a gridiron football or ice hockey helmet. They have been used in football practices since 2015, with the National Football League (NFL) first mandating their use for some position groups since 2022. After expanding this mandate to further position groups in the following years, the NFL officially allowed for their use in live games in 2024 as an optional piece of equipment. The equipment has also been used in the Canadian Football League (CFL), as well as in collegiate and youth levels of American football.

Players have been documented as initially hesitant of the equipment, or critical of its aesthetics, but ultimately recognized the equipment's role in player safety. NFL research has found Guardian Caps reduce impact force and diminish concussion rate, but independent research has not confirmed these findings. Independent studies have not found that the equipment provides substantial improvement in mitigating the effect of head impact.

== Description ==
The Guardian Caps are soft-shell padding that attach to the outer layer of a football helmet, covering it. The caps help to absorb contact on hits to the helmet. According to Calgary Stampeders equipment manager George Hopkins, the caps are lightweight, weighing less than 1 pound (0.45 kg). While much media coverage has centered on the caps' usage in the NFL, the equipment also has documented use in other professional leagues, as well as the collegiate and youth levels. The caps are also used by ice hockey players.

Guardian Sports, a manufacturer of Guardian Caps, have stated that the caps can reduce heat inside a helmet by around 15 to 20 °F (8 to 11 °C) when used in conditions of 90 °F (32 °C) and higher. This is due to the foam of the caps not conducting heat like the polycarbonate used in most helmets and thus the foam of the Guardian Cap behaves more as an insulator.

When used in games, the cap is covered by a wrap resembling the helmet worn by the player's team, such as depicting the logo and patterns. This ensures the headgear matches their teammates'.

== History ==
Ancillary helmet pads had been developed from at least the late 1980s. However, their use voided the warranties and certifications of helmet manufacturers. This position was supported by the US National Operating Committee on Standards for Athletic Equipment (NOCSAE) until 2013, when it recognized third-party certification for add-on equipment. Guardian was formed in 2010 by the owners of a materials science company. They initially developed a soft-shelled football helmet intended to replace the hard-shelled helmets of the 1960s, but it did not gain acceptance. With the change to NOCSAE rules, they decided that a soft-shell cover would be a more viable product while demonstrating the advantages of soft-shell helmet technology. Guardian Caps have been used in high school football programs from 2015.

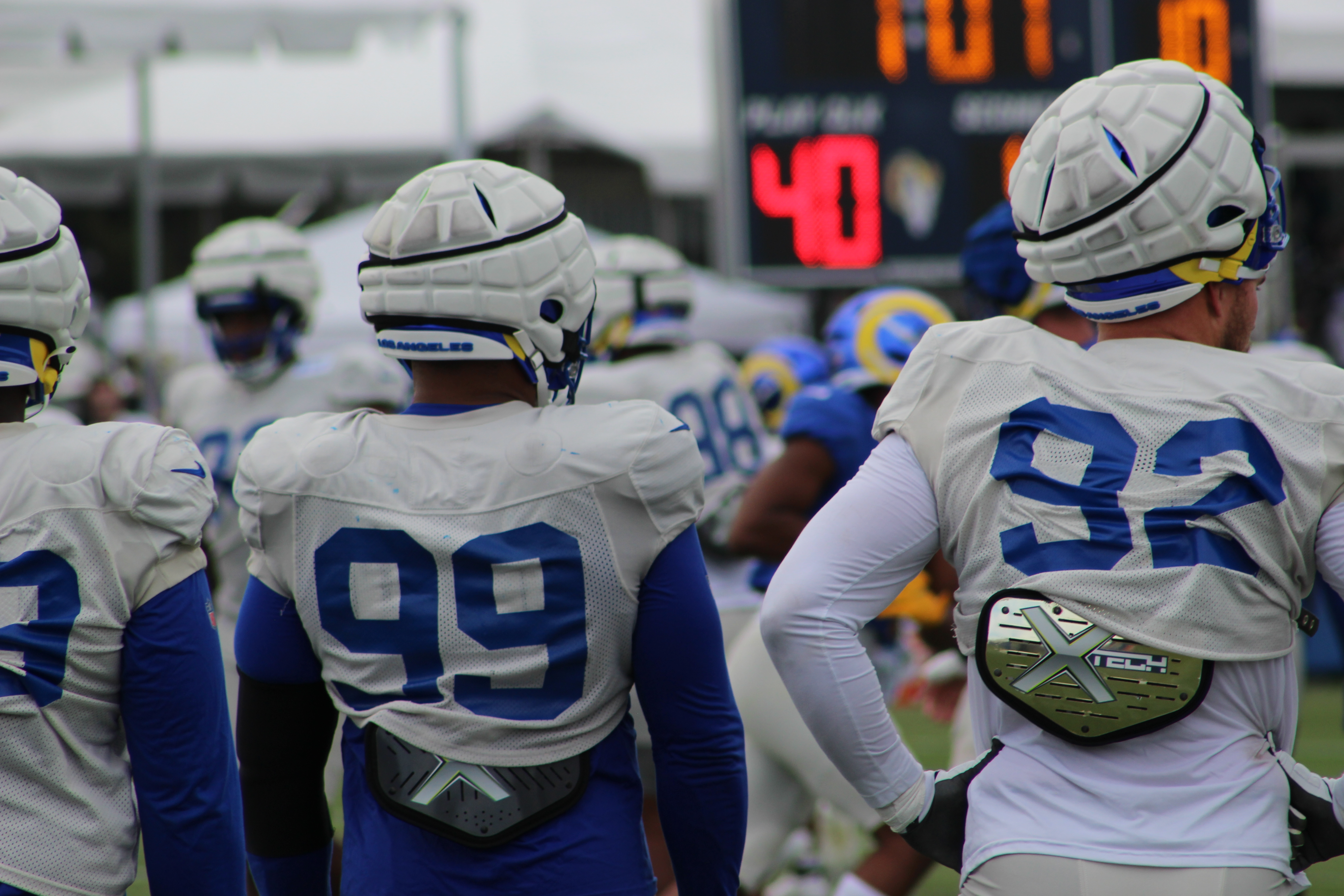
Los Angeles Rams players wearing Guardian Caps during their 2023 training camp. Two years prior, the Rams became an early adopter of the equipment.

Guardian further developed the equipment partly through a grant awarded by the NFL in 2017. Running back Peyton Logan stated he used Guardian Caps in 2020 and 2021, during his college career. The Los Angeles Rams became early adopters of the caps in 2021, after the team's quarterback, Matthew Stafford, injured his hand on an uncapped helmet during training camp.

During the Annual League Meeting in March 2022, the NFL passed a mandate and began requiring offensive and defensive linemen, tight ends, and linebackers to wear Guardian Caps during every preseason practice between the start of the training camp contact period and the second preseason game. This mandate was put into place after discussions with the Competition Committee and the Owners' Health and Safety Advisory Committee, as well as "consultation with [NFL] head coaches".

During the 2023 NFL offseason, the mandates on wearing Guardian Caps were expanded. Running backs and fullbacks were added to the position groups required to wear them, while their use was made required for "every preseason practice, as well as every regular-season and postseason practice with contact". Ahead of the 2023 season, the CFL also mandated the use of Guardian Caps during training camp and padded practices for offensive and defensive linemen, running backs, and linebackers. In August 2023, NFL executive Jeff Miller stated on Good Morning Football that the caps could one day be worn in-game. That month, NFL spokesman Brian McCarthy clarified that a player would be told no if they were to ask to wear a Guardian Cap during a live game. College football programs were noted for using Guardian Caps in 2023, with Auburn players wearing them during practices that fall.

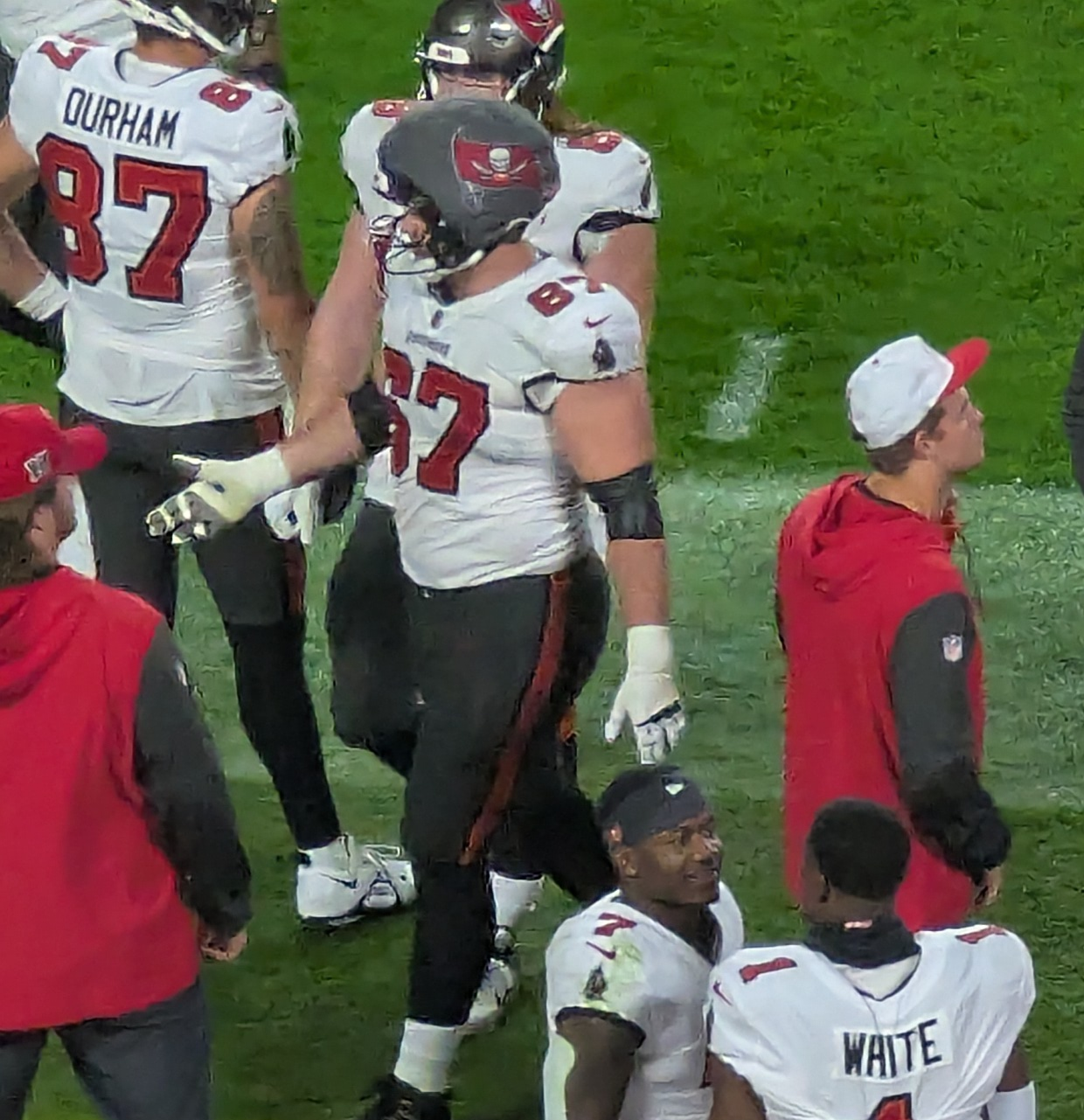
Tampa Bay Buccaneers player Luke Goedeke (center) wearing a Guardian Cap during a regular season game in 2024.

The NFL began requiring wide receivers and defensive backs to wear the equipment during practices in 2024, which left only quarterbacks, kickers, and punters as not being mandated to wear them. Players in those position groups were, however, still allowed to wear them if they chose to do so. Players can also be exempted from using Guardian Caps during the mandated training camp portion "if they wear one of six new helmet models that the league and the NFL Players Association have identified as providing equal or better protection". During an April 2024 webinar, NFL chief administration officer Dawn Aponte announced that the league decided on permitting players to use Guardian Caps during games if they so desired.

The first player to wear a Guardian Cap during any organized game was offensive lineman James Daniels of the Pittsburgh Steelers during an NFL preseason game against the Houston Texans on August 9, 2024. The first player to wear a Guardian Cap during a professional regular season game was running back Thomas Bertrand-Hudon of the Saskatchewan Roughriders during a game against the Montreal Alouettes on August 16, 2024. Several NFL players, including Josh Whyle of the Tennessee Titans, wore Guardian Caps during the 2024 regular season.

Guardian Sports developed a successor model, the Guardian Cap NXT 2.0, that was approved by the NFL for the 2026 season. It has a sleeker surface which allows for stickers to be directly applied.

== Reception ==
Players were noted to be initially hesitant about the caps. During the 2022 NFL offseason, Arizona Cardinals linebacker J. J. Watt joked that "You feel like a bobblehead [wearing a Guardian Cap]. Like you're gonna fall over", though he conceded that he understood why they were being used. Other initial reactions were sometimes negative, with Miller stating that some feedback concentrated around the Caps' fit, as they sometimes "slipped a little bit". Similar to Watt, one CFL player commented on the "bobblehead" aesthetics of the caps. Stampeders defensive lineman Mike Rose stated "They look really goofy, but I mean, they're meant to help our brains and possibly help in CTE prevention". Sportswriter Mike Florio stated that "While the league would likely never put it this way, aesthetics matter," opining that the "Guardian Cap objectively doesn't look good. It's big and it's bulky and it makes the helmet look like someone tried to soundproof it with egg cartons". Ahead of the 2024 season, for example, many players on the Indianapolis Colts had declined to wear the cap for aesthetic reasons; only two players were publicly planning to use it.

Some player reaction has been noted as receptive. In 2024, the Rams' equipment manager Brendan Burger detailed that Guardian Caps became the norm for the team, commenting that "The players know the Caps. They've seen the data, it works. The Guardian Caps have become another piece of equipment that they take to practice". Nate Davis of USA Today wrote that the adoption of the caps for in-game use was "something of a seismic shift as it pertains to game day, but players have generally embraced the padded covers attached to the outside of the helmet".

== Research ==
The NFL has conducted research and disseminated data regarding Guardian Caps. In 2023, Judy Battista wrote for NFL.com about league data showing that during hits to a player's helmet, Guardian Caps "will absorb 11 to 12 percent of the force", and that "if both players are wearing the cap and have a helmet-to-helmet hit, the force of the impact is reduced by around 20 percent". Also in 2023, Miller shared that there was a "52 percent decrease in concussions suffered by players at positions wearing Guardian Caps, compared to the concussion rate of players at the same positions over the last three years of training camps when Guardian Caps weren't worn".

The efficacy of Guardian Caps has also been studied by researchers independent of the NFL; the findings so far have cast doubt on their efficacy. A 2017 study published in the Journal of Athletic Training "could not conclude that the Guardian Cap provided measureable impact mitigation". Another study published in the journal in 2023 suggested that the caps "may not be effective in reducing the magnitude of head impacts experienced by NCAA Division I American football players". Another 2023 study, published in the International Journal of Environmental Research and Public Health found that "protective soft-shell padding did not reduce head impact kinematic outcomes among college football athletes".
