= Shoulder pad (sport) =

Protective sports equipment

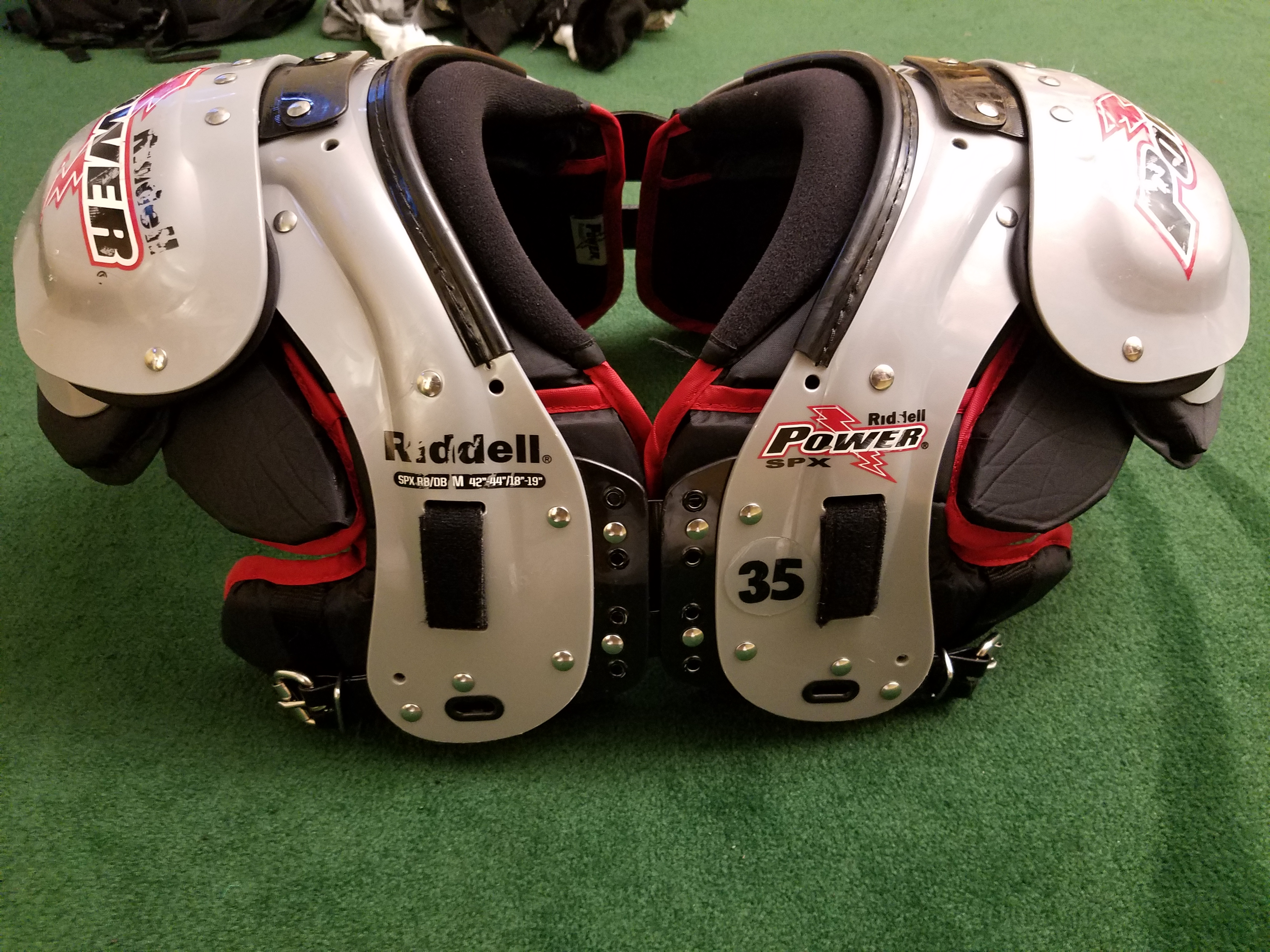
Modern American football shoulder pads

Shoulder pads are a piece of protective equipment used in many contact sports such as gridiron football, lacrosse, and ice hockey and some non-contact sports such as ringette. Most modern shoulder pads consist of a shock absorbing foam material with a hard plastic outer covering. The pieces are usually secured by rivets or strings that the user can tie to adjust the size.

== History ==
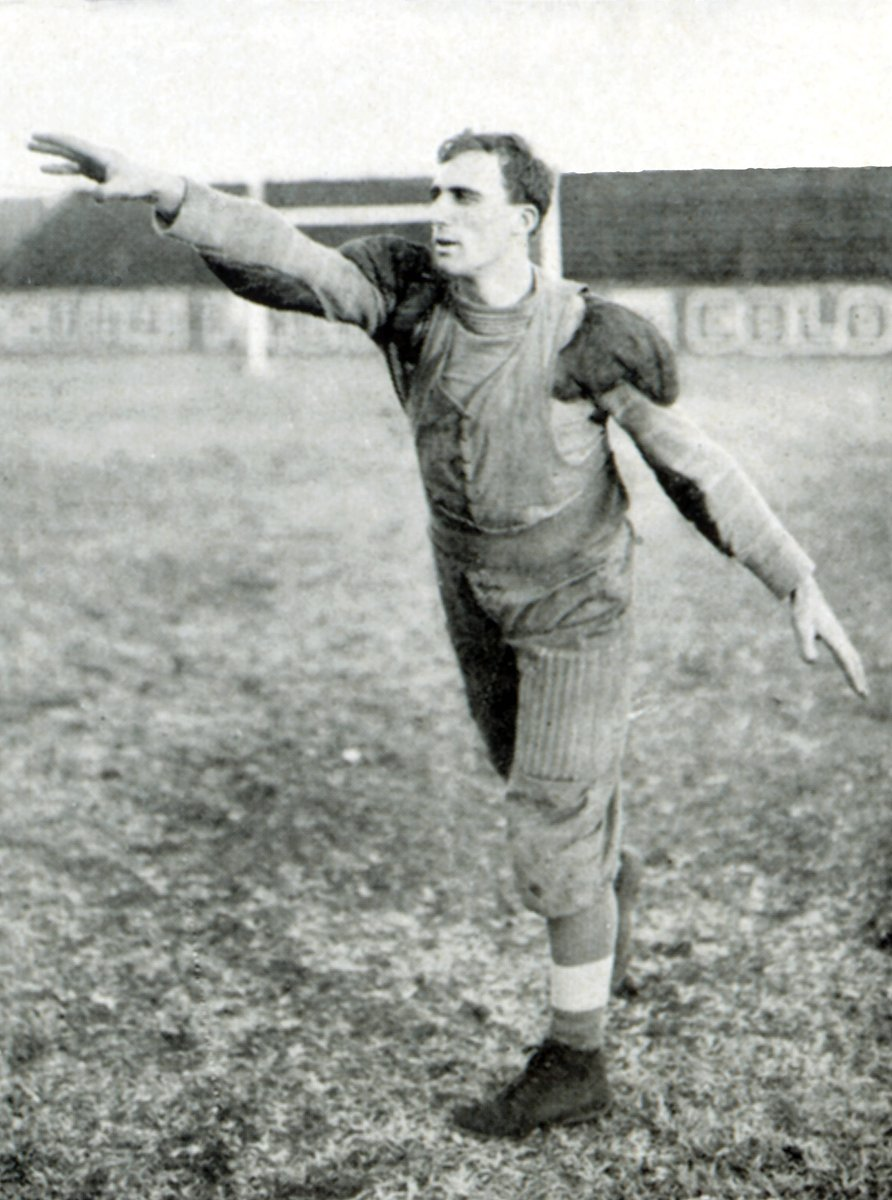
1906 photograph of early American football uniform with rudimentary shoulder pads worn by Bradbury Robinson, who threw the first legal forward pass

The first American football shoulder pads were created by Princeton University student L.P. Smock in 1877. These were made of leather and wool and were thin, light, and did not provide much protection. In the early years of the 1900s decade, many young football players were killed while playing the sport due to the ferocity of the sport combined with the lack of sufficient protection. In 1905 President Theodore Roosevelt took the initiative to clean up the sport. He decried football as a dangerous sport and certain actions needed to be taken so that the sport could remain legal. These shoulder pads were sewn into the players' jerseys rather than being worn as a separate piece of equipment. Allegedly Pop Warner was the first to have his players wear shoulder pads. When he was coaching at the Carlisle Indian Industrial School, he was the first one to use pads made of fiber rather than cotton. The traditional, separate, over the head shoulder pads first made an appearance around 1910 to help make football a safer sport--these are the same style shoulder pads still used today. However, many players still did not use shoulder pads until the 1950s. In the 1960s, newer technology allowed companies to produce shoulder pads that were made of foam with an outer shell of hard plastic, offering improved protection when being hit. The drawback to these pads were that they did not have very much ventilation. Limited ventilation caused players to dehydrate quicker. This issue was fixed in the 1990s when synthetic fibers were added, making the shoulder pads more breathable.

== Pop Warner Safety Measurements ==
Equipment Fitting Guidelines:

Shoulder pads

- Check chest and shoulder measurements by using cloth tape around upper torso at center of chest and over shoulders from tip of the left humerus to tip of the right humerus. Use corresponding shoulder pad sizing chart from manufacturer.
- Place pads over head and complete front lock/laces then pull straps on sides into place. Pads should be tight without irritating the axilla or pinching/binding in the collar or neck opening. This should occur at rest and confirmed with player turning from side to side.
- The foam pad should extend at least 1/4 in. past the humerus, and total coverage should extend over sternum, front and upper aspect of shoulder, scapula, and rhomboid regions.
- Keep in mind that some shoulder pad styles are designed for different football positions to use.
- Always inspect equipment after use

== See also ==
- Protective equipment in gridiron football
- American football
