= Winged football helmet =

Football helmet

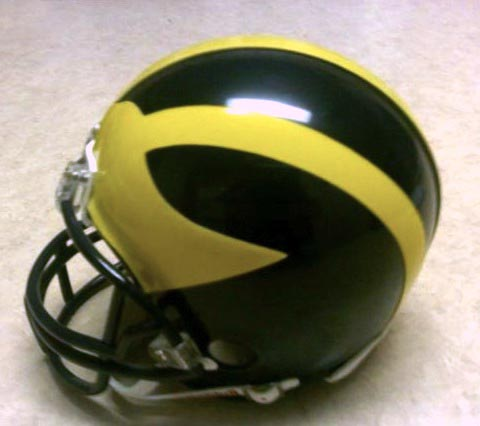
A miniature replica of the Michigan Wolverines football helmet

The winged football helmet is a helmet bearing a distinctive two-toned painted design that typically has sharp outward curves over the forehead forming a wing. It is worn by many high school and college American football teams.

== History ==
A full-size replica of the 1933 Michigan State gold and black winged helmet

Early football helmet designs incorporated panels of leather, which were sometimes manufactured using strips of contrasting color. The Indiana and Michigan State football teams also adopted variations on the design. Michigan State's helmet used a colored stripe (matching the color of the wings) running down the spine of the helmet, while Indiana's version featured three such stripes, nearly identical to the form used today. The Georgetown Hoyas also used a winged helmet for several seasons during the 1930s and 1940s.

Famed football coach Herbert "Fritz" Crisler is credited with popularizing the winged helmet nationwide. In 1935, while head coach at Princeton University, Crisler ordered stock helmets bearing leather wings out of the Spalding catalog. He had the leather panels painted in contrasting orange and black colors, believing the design to have practical advantages on the field. In 1938, Crisler became head football coach and athletic director at the University of Michigan, where he added maize and blue coloring to the stock design. These helmets made their debut at the Wolverines' 1938 season opener against Michigan State and have been worn ever since. It has become an icon of Michigan's football program, which held it exclusively for more than seventy years.

Crisler once recalled his rationale for the design: "Michigan had a plain black helmet and we wanted to dress it up a little. We added some color and used the same basic helmet I had designed at Princeton." There was one other consideration. Crisler thought this unique helmet could be helpful to his passers as they tried to spot their receivers downfield. "There was a tendency to use different-colored helmets just for receivers in those days, but I always thought that would be as helpful for the defense as for the offense," said Crisler.

Princeton abandoned the design after Crisler left in 1938, but in 1998, resurrected the winged design (in orange and black) for the Princeton Tigers. When David M. Nelson, a former Michigan player, became the head coach of the University of Delaware's football team in 1951, Delaware began using a blue and gold winged helmet, which they use to this day. Several high school teams across the country have also adopted the design. Other athletic teams from the University of Michigan have incorporated the design into their headgear, including ice and field hockey, baseball, softball, lacrosse, rowing and swimming.

In 1996, the Connecticut Coyotes of the Arena Football League wore red, white, and blue winged helmets.

There is also evidence that several early National Football League teams wore the winged helmet. The New York Giants wore an early version of the winged helmet in 1930–1931. The Chicago Bears used the winged helmet in 1931 and 1932. The Frankford Yellow Jackets wore the winged helmet in 1931 before the franchise folded due to the Great Depression. The Yellow Jackets successors, the Philadelphia Eagles, used the Yellow Jackets old uniforms (including the winged helmets) for their first two seasons in the NFL, and would later use replicas as a throwback uniform during the 2007 season. The short-lived Cincinnati Reds also used a winged helmet in 1933. The Pittsburgh Pirates (now the Pittsburgh Steelers) wore the winged helmet in 1935 and 1936. Finally, the Giants would wear the winged helmet again from 1937 to 1947, making them the last NFL team to wear the winged helmet on a regular basis as well as the last NFL team to wear them in any occasion until the Eagles wore the Yellow Jackets throwbacks in 2007. In the Canadian Football League, the BC Lions used a winged helmet in 1960 and 1961.

== Colleges that used the winged football helmet ==
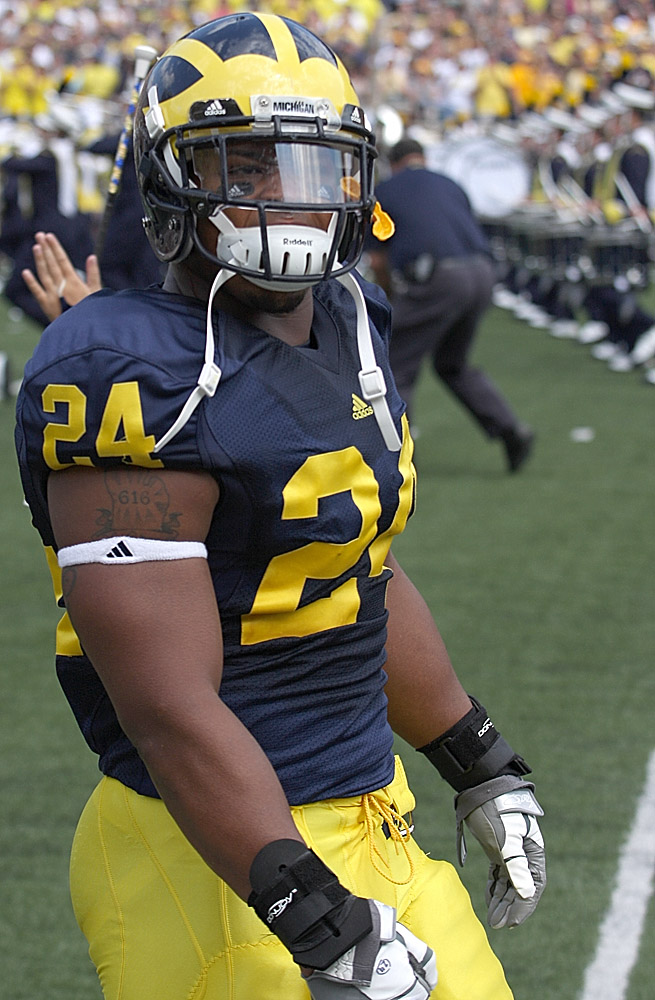
Kevin Grady of Michigan in the winged helmet

=== Division I FBS ===
- University of Michigan (maize and blue)
- University of Delaware (royal blue and gold)

=== Division I FCS ===
- Saint Peter's College, New Jersey (blue and white), before it dropped its football program in 2007 (the college subsequently changed its name to Saint Peter's University in 2012)
- Princeton University (orange and black)

=== Division II ===
- Southwest Baptist University (purple and white), prior to a uniform change in 2008
- Pace University (blue and gold), from 1993 to 2000

=== Division III ===
- Blackburn College (red and black), in 1999
- Grove City College
- Gustavus Adolphus College
- Middlebury College
- Nichols College (white and green), prior to a change in 2011

=== Junior colleges ===
- Alfred State College, through the 2009 season
- Hutchinson Community College (white and black), worn through the 2006 season
- San Bernardino Valley College
