= Concussions in rugby union =

Risk of concussion from playing rugby union

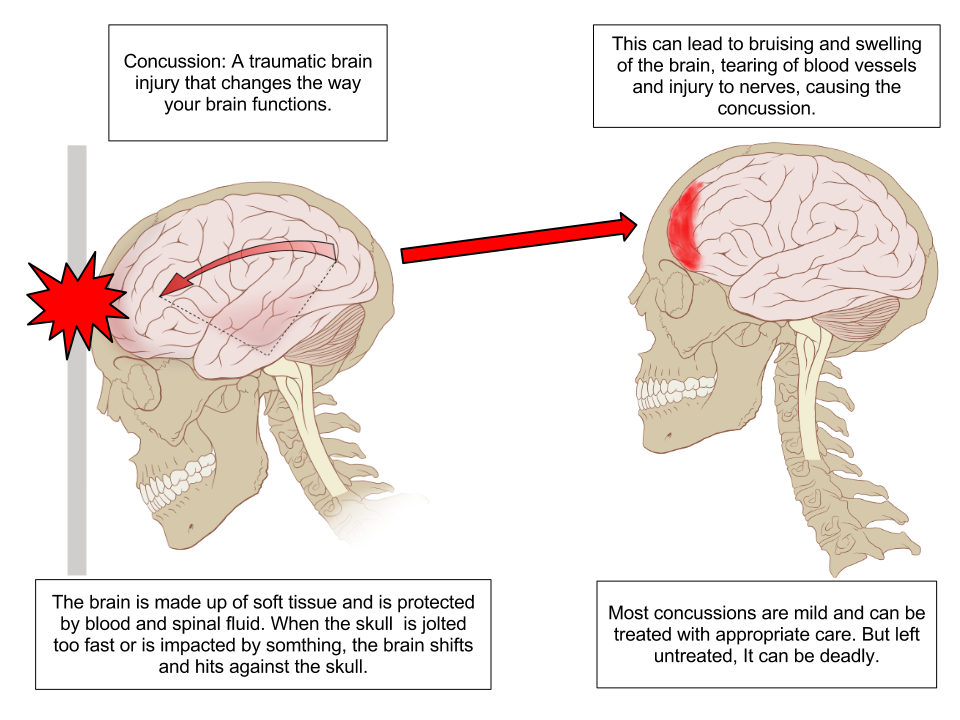
Example of what happens to one's brain inside their skull, when they are impacted by an outside force.

Concussions in professional rugby union are the most common injury received. Concussion can occur where an individual experiences an impact to the head, and are also notable in high-contact sports, including American football, boxing, MMA and Hockey. Concussions can occur in recreational activities like horse riding, jumping, cycling, and skiing as a result of forceful rotational moment, resulting in injuries to the brain due to the contact with the skull, giving the skull not enough time to move with the body, causing the brain to press against the skull. With the development of equipment and training methods, further education on identifying concussion symptoms, as well as adjustments to the terms of contact may allow players to make more informed decisions on their conduct on the pitch.

== History of concussions ==
A concussion, a subset of traumatic brain injury (TBI), defined as a force comes in contact with the head, neck or face, or fast movement of the head, causes a functional injury to the brain. The severity of any injury depends on the location & strength of the impact. Concussions may result in acute or prolonged impairment of neurological function, the brains ability to process information, which may be resolved in seven to ten days. A loss of consciousness is not a prerequisite for a concussion diagnosis, with blackouts occurring in less than 10% of concussions. Second-impact syndrome is when a player has obtained a second concussion when you either return to field the same day, or return to play before a complete recovery from a previous concussion. This is a result from brain swelling, from vascular congestion and increased intracranial pressure, this can be fatal to a player as it is a very difficult medical injury to control. The brain is surrounded by cerebrospinal fluid, which protects it from light trauma. More severe impacts, or the forces associated with rapid acceleration, may not be absorbed by this cushion. Concussion may be caused by impact forces, in which the head strikes or is struck by something, or impulsive forces, in which the head moves without itself being subject to blunt trauma (for example, when the chest hits something and the head snaps forward). Chronic traumatic encephalopathy, or "CTE", is an example of the cumulative damage that can occur as the result of multiple concussions or less severe blows to the head. The condition was previously referred to as "dementia pugilistica", or "punch drunk" syndrome, as it was first noted in boxers. The disease can lead to cognitive and physical handicaps such as parkinsonism, speech and memory problems, slowed mental processing, tremor, depression, and inappropriate behavior. It shares features with Alzheimer's disease.

In a 2013 interview, recently retired Scotland international Rory Lamont was critical of the then-current protocols for handling concussions, notably the Pitchside Suspected Concussion Assessment (PSCA) employed at that time::

The problem with the PSCA is a concussed player can pass the assessment. I know from first hand experience it can be quite ineffective in deciding if a player is concussed. It is argued that allowing the five-minutes assessment is better than zero minutes but it is not as clear cut as one might hope. Concussion symptoms regularly take 10 minutes or longer to actually present. Consequently the five-minute PSCA may be giving concussed players a license to return to the field.

The Concussion bin was replaced by the head bin in 2012 with the player's assessment taking 10 minutes.

== Connection with rugby union ==
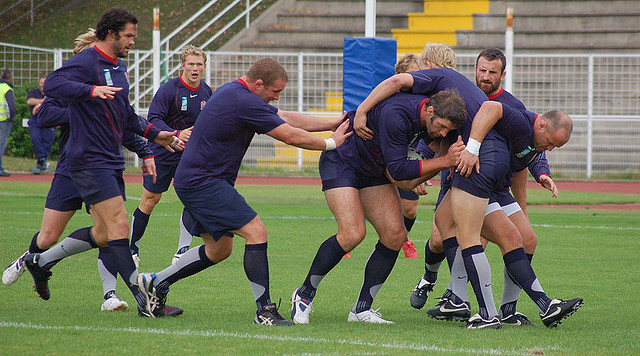
Rugby Union training session, practicing a maul.

Rugby union has been played since the early 19th century. Being a high contact sport it has the highest announced rates of concussions and outside England also has the highest number of catastrophic injuries out of any team sport. About a quarter of rugby players are injured in each season.

Research finding that during match play, concussion was reported at a higher level, and during training at a lower level, but still at a higher level than most players of another sport to receive. With the game being both physically and mentally demanding, it varies from being at high intensities of sprinting, tackling and rucking, with small intensities of jogging and walking. The position of the forwards consists of them having to have a lot of physical strength to get the ball from the other team, or create gaps for their team to run through. Where as the backs are the players that make the play happen, making runs with the ball, with the protection of the forwards stopping attacks, the backs still do get tackled like any other player on the field, so they have to have physical strength as much as a forward.

== Causes and likelihood of concussion ==
Concussion was the most commonly reported Premiership Rugby match injury in 2015–16 (for the 5th consecutive season), constituting appropriately 25% of all match injuries, and the RFU medical officer said that the tackle is where the overwhelming majority of concussions occur. A study found that playing more than 25 matches in the 2015/2016 season meant that sustaining concussion was more likely than not sustaining concussion.

== Signs of concussion ==
Some of the effects that concussion can cause to an individual's mind set can vary, depending on the circumstances and the severity of the impact. The common signs of concussion can be; blank look, slow to get up off of the ground, unsteady on their feet, grabbing their head, confused in where they are or what they are doing, and obviously if they are unconscious. These are the things that a spectator, coach and medical assistant will notice in a player. Sometimes concussion can go unrecognised, so from a players point there can be these symptoms; continual headaches, dizziness, visual problems, feeling of fatigue and drowsiness. These all can occur post game, so a player needs to have knowledge of what these signs could mean.

== Saliva testing ==
Although not commonly used at present, novel experimental methods to rapidly diagnose concussion in the field have been developed by research laboratories in the US and UK, based on the detection of RNA biomarkers in saliva.

== Treatment of the injury ==
Once taken off the field of play due to possible concussion, being unconscious, or showing the symptoms post game, getting medical advice as soon as possible is recommended. At the hospital or medical practice, the player will be under observation, if they are experiencing a headache, mild pain killers will be given. The medical professional will request that no food or drink is to be consumed until advised. They will then assess whether the player needs an x-ray, to check for any possible cervical vertebrae damage, or a computerised axial tomography (CT Scan) to check for any brain or cranium damage. With a mild head injury being sent home to take care and doing activities slower than usual, and maintaining painkillers. If symptoms of concussion do not disappear in the average of seven to ten days, then seek medical advice again as injury could be worse. In post-concussion syndrome, symptoms do not resolve for weeks, months, or years after a concussion, and may occasionally be permanent. About 10% to 20% of people have post concussion syndrome for more than a month.

== Controlling concussions ==
In order to minimise the risk of concussion and repetitive head trauma, the method of the 6 R's is used. Firstly Recognising and Removing a suspected player of concussion, to stop the injury from getting worse. Secondly Refer, whether the player is either recognised or suspected with concussion they must see a medical doctor as soon as possible. 90.8% of players knew they should not continue playing when concussed. 75% of players would continue an important game even if concussed. Of those concussed, 39.1% have tried to influence medical assessment with 78.2% stating it is possible or quite easy to do so. If the player is diagnosed with concussion, they then must Rest, until all signs of concussion are gone. The player must then Recover by just returning to general activities in life, then progressing back to playing. Returning to play, must follow the Graduated Return to Play (GRTP) protocol, by having clearance from a medical professional, and no symptoms of concussion. Despite good knowledge of concussion complications, management players engage in unsafe behaviour with little difference between gender and competition grades. Information regarding symptoms and management should be available to all players, coaches, and parents. On-going education is needed to assist coaches in identifying concussion signs and symptoms. Provision of medical care should be mandatory at every level of competition.

== Effect of concussions on brain functioning in later life ==
A 2017 study found that past participation in rugby or a history of concussion were associated with small to moderate neurocognitive deficits after retirement from competitive sport.

== Ethical Considerations ==
The long-term consequences of concussions should not be viewed solely as risks affecting only the athlete. Neurological damage from repeated head impacts can alter personality, behavior, emotional regulation, and decision-making in ways that profoundly affect family members who never consented to these changes. These symptoms:including aggression, depression, impaired judgment, impulsivity, and increased risk of substance abuse, are well-documented outcomes of Chronic Traumatic Encephalopathy (CTE). As these effects often emerge years or decades after retirement, spouses and children may ultimately bear the burden of a loved one's altered neurological state. Ethical considerations about concussions in youth rugby must also include children. Many begin playing rugby at a very young age, and contact (including tackling) often starts around age ten. Because children are not fully capable of understanding or consenting to the long-term risks of repeated head impacts, allowing them to engage in contact rugby raises moral concerns: they are dependent on adults, coaches, parents, and governing bodies, to act responsibly. While World Rugby has implemented head-impact assessment protocols and penalizes high tackles (those above the neck), these protections do not eliminate the risk: even properly executed low tackles can cause head injury via whiplash when the head hits the ground. Studies demonstrate that youth rugby players suffer concussions at nontrivial rates, with match-concussion incidence ranging from 0.2 to 6.9 per 1,000 player-hours. Long-term evidence among former rugby players links repeated head impacts to neurodegenerative pathology: in one sample, roughly two-thirds of former players showed signs of Chronic Traumatic Encephalopathy (CTE), which is associated with cognitive decline and brain disease later in life. Given these facts, permitting children to engage in contact rugby involves ethical responsibility: adults and governing bodies should weigh whether potential short-term benefits outweigh the risk of lifelong neurological harm, especially since the children themselves cannot give informed consent.

== See also ==
- Head injury
- Rugby union
- Concussions in sport
- Concussions in Australian sport
- Traumatic brain injury
- Chronic traumatic encephalopathy
