= Shock response spectrum =

Graphical representation of vibrations

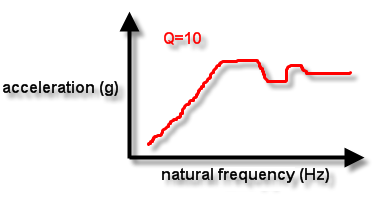
SRS representation of the transient input shown above in SRS form.

A Shock Response Spectrum (SRS) is a graphical representation of a shock, or any other transient acceleration input, in terms of how a Single Degree Of Freedom (SDOF) system (like a mass on a spring) would respond to that input. The horizontal axis shows the natural frequency of a hypothetical SDOF, and the vertical axis shows the peak acceleration which this SDOF would undergo as a consequence of the shock input.

== Calculation ==
The most direct and intuitive way to generate an SRS from a shock waveform is the following procedure:

1. Pick a damping ratio (or equivalently, a quality factor Q) for your SRS to be based on;
2. Pick a frequency f, and assume that there is a hypothetical Single Degree of Freedom (SDOF) system with a damped natural frequency of f ;
3. Calculate (by direct time-domain simulation) the maximum instantaneous absolute acceleration experienced by the mass element of your SDOF at any time during (or after) exposure to the shock in question. This acceleration is a;
4. Draw a dot at (f,a);
5. Repeat steps 2–4 for many other values of f, and connect all the dots together into a smooth curve.

The resulting plot of peak acceleration vs test system frequency is called a Shock Response Spectrum. It is often plotted with frequency in Hz, and with acceleration in units of g

== Example application ==
Consider a computer chassis containing three cards with fundamental natural frequencies of f_{1}, f_{2}, and f_{3}. Lab tests have previously confirmed that this system survives a certain shock waveform—say, the shock from dropping the chassis from 2 feet above a hard floor. Now, the customer wants to know whether the system will survive a different shock waveform—say, from dropping the chassis from 4 feet above a carpeted floor. If the SRS of the new shock is lower than the SRS of the old shock at each of the three frequencies f_{1}, f_{2}, and f_{3}, then the chassis is likely to survive the new shock. (It is not, however, guaranteed.)

== Details and limitations ==
Any transient waveform can be presented as an SRS, but the relationship is not unique; many different transient waveforms can produce the same SRS (something one can take advantage of through a process called "Shock Synthesis"). Due to only tracking the peak instantaneous acceleration the SRS does not contain all the information in the transient waveform from which it was created.

Different damping ratios produce different SRSs for the same shock waveform. Zero damping will produce a maximum response. Very high damping produces a very boring SRS: A horizontal line. The level of damping is demonstrated by the "quality factor", Q which can also be thought of transmissibility in sinusoidal vibration case. Relative damping of 5% results in a Q of 10. An SRS plot is incomplete if it doesn't specify the assumed Q value.

An SRS is of little use for fatigue-type damage scenarios, as the transform removes information of how many times a peak acceleration (and inferred stress) is reached.

The SDOF system model also can be used to characterize the severity of vibrations, with two criteria:

- the exceeding of characteristic instantaneous stress limits (yield stress, ultimate stress etc.). We then define the extreme response spectrum (ERS), similar to the shock response spectrum;
- the damage by fatigue following the application of a large number of cycles, thus taking into account the duration of the vibration (Fatigue damage spectrum (FDS)).

Like many other useful tools, the SRS is not applicable to significantly non-linear systems.

== See also ==
- Shock data logger
- Shock detector
