= List of NHL players with chronic traumatic encephalopathy =

Chronic traumatic encephalopathy (CTE) is a type of brain damage that has been found in 18 of 19 deceased former National Hockey League (NHL) players, according to a 2024 report by the Boston University CTE Center, which has led the effort to diagnose CTE cases. The NHL has not acknowledged a link between playing Ice hockey and being diagnosed, with league commissioner Gary Bettman claiming that isolated cases of players with CTE did not necessarily come from playing in the NHL.

== List ==
=== Deceased players with CTE confirmed post-mortem ===
A common definitive test currently can be made only by examining the brain tissue of a deceased victim. As of December 2024, 18 of 19 NHL players whose brains had been autopsied had CTE.

As the vast majority of deceased former players have not had specialized autopsies done on their brains—the first such autopsy was not performed until 2009, the following list may show a small fraction of NHL players who have had CTE.

- Ralph Backstrom
- Wade Belak
- Derek Boogaard
- Garrett Burnett
- Lyndon Byers
- Todd Ewen
- Reg Fleming
- Bobby Hull
- Greg Johnson
- Dan Maloney
- Rick Martin
- Stan Mikita
- Steve Montador
- Bob Murdoch
- Jeff Parker
- Gino Odjick
- Bob Probert
- Henri Richard
- Rick Rypien
- Chris Simon
- Marek Svatoš
- Zarley Zalapski
- Larry Zeidel

== See also ==
- Chronic traumatic encephalopathy in sports
- Sports-related traumatic brain injury
- Violence in ice hockey
