= Alex Guerrero =

Alex Guerrero may refer to:

- Alex Guerrero (alternative medicine), American alternative medicine practitioner known for his infomercials and work with professional football players
- Alex Guerrero (baseball), Cuban-born professional baseball player
- Alex Guerrero (lineman), American professional football lineman
