= Head impact telemetry system =

Head Impact Telemetry System (HITS) is a hardware and software system intended as a shock detector and logger; the hardware is embedded in football helmets and transmits data to a computer.

The system was developed by Simbex, based on Lebanon, New Hampshire, in collaboration with Virginia Tech, starting around 2000. By 2006 the system weighed about six ounces and had six sensors, a small computer, a battery and a radio; helmets including the system were marketed by Riddell and a set of 40 cost around $50,000 at that time. At that time nine NCAA football teams and a high school team were testing it, and the NFL had decided it not well validated enough to use.
