= Insufficient solder =

Soldering defect

Insufficient solder is a soldering defect in which the amount of solder forming the joint is inadequate to ensure proper mechanical and electrical integrity. The reduced solder volume weakens the solder joint by decreasing its effective cross-sectional area.

In addition to reducing joint strength, insufficient solder also alters the geometry of the solder fillet. This change can modify the path of maximum shear strain within the solder joint when the assembly experiences differential thermal expansion between components and the printed circuit board (PCB). As a result, crack propagation may occur along a smaller cross-sectional area, significantly reducing the joint's reliability and increasing the risk of early failure under thermal or mechanical stress.

== Causes ==
- Low solder paste volume or poor deposition
- Improper soldering parameters (temperature, time, flux)
- Poor pad or component lead design
- Misalignment or contamination
- Inadequate solder wave or stencil design

== Failure Mechanisms ==
- Thermal Shock: Accelerates crack initiation and joint fracture
- Random Vibration: Induces fatigue cracking; orientation-sensitive
- Combined Environment: Thermal shock + vibration accelerates failure
- Bend Test: Fracture under high-strain locations

== Notes ==
Insufficient solder compromises joint reliability under mechanical or thermal stress. Prevention relies on process optimization, proper pad/component design, and correct solder deposition.
