= Concussion substitute =

Multiple sports have concussion substitutes:

- Cricket
- Association football
- Rugby league

== See also ==
- Concussions in sport, a general article
