= Concussions in sport =

A concussion is a type of mild traumatic brain injury that is caused by a direct or indirect hit to the head, body, neck, or face. Concussions can be caused by various mechanisms, is a common injury associated with sports and can affect people of all ages. A concussion is defined as a "complex pathophysiological process affecting the brain, induced by biomechanical forces". A concussion should be suspected in any person who falls or has a hit to their face or their body and has a visible sign/clue that they may have a concussion or experiences any symptoms of concussion. The Concussion Recognition Tool 6 (CRT6) can be used to help non-medically trained people manage sport related concussion on the sideline to ensure that they are directed to the appropriate care. Symptoms of concussion can be felt right away or appear over the first 1–2 days after an accident. If an athlete has a suspected sport-related concussion they should not return to play that day, not be left alone for the first three hours after their injury, not drive until cleared by a medical professional, and not return to any activity that has a risk of hitting their head or falling (i.e. gameplay or scrimmages) until they have a medical assessment. If the person has worsening symptoms or any 'red flag symptoms', they need immediate medical attention (urgent care or an emergency department). A few of these 'red flag' symptoms include: loss of vision or double vision, loss of consciousness, increased confusion, weakness or tingling, severe or increasing headaches, and/or repeated vomiting.

As of 2012, the four major professional sports leagues in the United States and Canada included policies for managing concussion risk. Sports-related concussions are generally analyzed by athletic training or medical staff on the sidelines using an evaluation tool for cognitive function known as the Sport Concussion Assessment Tool (SCAT), a symptom severity checklist, and a balance test. Concussions cannot be seen on X-rays or CT scans.

Repeated concussions are known to cause neurological disorders, particularly chronic traumatic encephalopathy (CTE), which in professional athletes has led to premature retirement, erratic behavior and even suicide. The danger of repeated concussions has long been known for boxers and wrestlers. A form of CTE common in these two sports, dementia pugilistica (DP), was first described in 1928. An awareness of the risk of concussions in other sports began to grow in the 1990s, and especially in the mid-2000s, in both the medical and the professional sports communities, as a result of the study of brains of prematurely deceased American football players, that showed an extremely high incidence of CTE (see concussions in American football).

== Prognosis ==
Most people fully recover from a concussion within 4 weeks. But the recovery time can vary. Up to about 1/3 of people experience persisting symptoms after concussion (PHAC) or persistent post concussion symptoms (PPAC), defined as symptoms that last more than 4 weeks. After an injury, concussion symptoms can begin immediately or be and delayed by 1–2 days at most. The immediate symptoms experienced after concussions include memory loss, disorientation, and poor balance. Delayed symptoms experienced in the later stages include sleeping disorders and behavioral changes. Both immediate and delayed symptoms can continue for long periods of time and have a negative impact on recovery.

=== Post-concussion syndrome / persisting symptoms after concussion ===
There is the potential of persisting symptoms after concussion (sometimes called post-concussion syndrome), defined as a set of symptoms that continue for more than 4 weeks a concussion is sustained. Persisting symptoms can be classified as physical, cognitive, emotional, and sleep symptoms. Physical symptoms include headache, nausea, and vomiting. Athletes may experience cognitive symptoms that include speaking slowly, difficulty remembering and concentrating. Emotional and sleep symptoms include irritability, sadness, drowsiness, and trouble falling asleep. Persisting symptoms interfere with day-to-day functions, particularly in adolescents, such as academic performance, activity levels, and the duration in which they can return to their sport.

=== Second-impact syndrome ===
Subsequent impact can cause a rare condition known as second-impact syndrome, which can result in severe injury or death. Second-impact syndrome is a result of a second head injury before the brain has adequate time to heal between concussions. It typically give signs and symptoms of a post-concussion syndrome (visual, motor, or sensory abnormalities and difficulties with cognitive processes). Even minor repeated head blow may result in malignant cerebral edema and even death. Nonetheless, second-impact syndrome is an infrequent finding, predominately involving young athletes, and only rarely is fatal.

=== Risk from repeated concussions ===
The risks associated with repeated concussions and also repeated sub-concussive impacts in sport, including the potential risk for neurological disorders, are not clear and consensus statements reveal a "spectrum of perspectives" in the medical literature. Repeated concussions have been linked to a variety of neurological disorders among athletes, including chronic traumatic encephalopathy (CTE), Alzheimer's disease, Parkinsonism and amyotrophic lateral sclerosis (ALS).

Repeated concussions or mild-to-moderate traumatic brain injuries (TBI) have also been established to have long-effects on the motor dysfunction and movement disorders, however a systematic review has concluded that more investigation is needed to fully understand the long term effects of concussions and TBIs.

=== Other risks ===
In addition, returning to sports with impaired sensorimotor function after experiencing a sports-related concussion increases the risk of sustaining musculoskeletal (MSK) injuries. In addition, athletes that experience a concussion are twice as likely to sustain a musculoskeletal injury compared to non-concussed athletes. Students, at all age levels, that deal with sports-related concussions may suffer from symptoms that impact their focus in school, grades, and attendance.

== Incidence ==
It is estimated that as many as 1.6–3.8 million concussions occur in the US per year in competitive sports and recreational activities; this is a rough estimate, since as many as 50% of concussions go unreported. Concussions occur in all sports with the highest incidence in American football, ice hockey, rugby, soccer, and basketball. In addition to concussions caused by a single severe impact, multiple minor impacts may also cause brain injury. Less than 10% of cases experience a loss of consciousness, and many typical symptoms appear after the initial concussion evaluation. The overall incidence risk of concussion is higher in adults than in youth, as the injury rate per 1,000 athletic exposures for youth is 0.23, compared to 0.28 in collegiate athletes.

An analysis of National Collegiate Athletic Association (NCAA) injury reports estimated concussion rates among student athletes who participate in NCAA sports during the 2011–2012 through 2014–2015 academic years:

	Sport	Rates per 1000 Athlete-Exposures (95% Confidence Interval)		
	Sport	Overall	Competition	Practice
Men's	Baseball	0.09	0.16	0.04
Men's	Basketball	0.38	0.53	0.34
Men's	Football	0.75	3.25	0.48
Men's	Ice hockey	0.74	2.40	0.20
Men's	Lacrosse	0.30	0.91	0.19
Men's	Soccer	0.26	0.67	0.14
Men's	Wrestling	0.89	4.31	0.48
Women's	Basketball	0.53	1.00	0.39
Women's	Ice hockey	0.78	2.11	0.31
Women's	Lacrosse	0.45	1.28	0.25
Women's	Soccer	0.54	1.65	0.18
Women's	Softball	0.26	0.42	0.18
Women's	Volleyball	0.37	0.64	0.27

=== Women in sport ===
Numerous reports have indicated that female athletes suffer more concussions than male athletes. A December 2008 report states that 29,167 female high school soccer players in the United States suffered from concussions in 2005, compared to 20,929 male players. In high school basketball, 12,923 girls suffered from concussions while only 3,823 boys did. Girls also sustained more concussions in softball, compared to boys in baseball. Female athletes also had longer recovery times than males, and also had lower scores on visual memory tests. Girls also have longer recovery times for concussions, which may be due to a greater rate of blood flow in the brain.

Women's ice hockey was reported as one of the most dangerous sports in the NCAA, with a concussion rate of 2.72 per 1,000 player hours. Even though men's ice hockey allows body checking, while women's ice hockey does not, the rate of concussions for men is 46% lower, at 1.47 per 1,000 player hours. College football also has lower concussion rates than women's hockey, with a rate of 2.34 per 1,000.

Women's basketball is one of the women's sports with the highest risks of getting a concussion. Women have a greater risk of getting a concussion by dribbling/ball handling rather than defending. Also it was found that female college basketball players typically receive concussions during games rather than practices.

Studies have also linked long-term cognitive effects in women's sports as a result of repeated concussions. A cross-sectional study demonstrated women's professional football players with a past of multiple concussions that struggled with attention-related neurocognitive functions.

== By sport ==
=== American football ===
American football causes 250,000 concussions annually, and 20% of high-school football players experience a concussion every year. In 2000, researchers from the Sports Medicine Research Laboratory at the University of North Carolina at Chapel Hill analyzed 17,549 players from 242 different schools. 888 (5.1%) of the players analyzed have at least one concussion a season, and 131 (14.7%) of them have had another concussion the year later. Division III and high-school players have a higher tendency to sustain a concussion than Division II and Division I players. In 2001, the National Football League Players Association partnered with the UNC to determine whether professional football players suffer any health effects after any injuries, although the findings were criticized by the NFL for being unreliable due to being based on self-reporting by the players.

==== National Football League policy ====
The National Football League's (NFL) policy began in 2007, with injured players examined on field by the medical team. The league's policy included the "NFL Sidelines Concussion Exam", which requires players who have taken hits to the head to perform tests of concentration, thinking and balance. In 2011, the league introduced an assessment test which combines a symptoms checklist, a limited neurological examination, a cognitive evaluation, and a balance assessment. For a player to be allowed to return, he must be asymptomatic.

As of October 2022, the NFL and the NFLPA updated their concussion protocol once again following an incident that occurred with Miami Dolphin's quarterback Tua Tagovailoa. Tagovailoa suffered a hit in a game against the Buffalo Bills on September 25, 2022, in the first half, causing him to lose balance which resulted in him exiting the game and being evaluated. He was then placed back in the game after halftime since he passed the protocol despite the signs of gross motor instability (GMI). Following this game, Tagovailoa suffered another brutal hit in a game against the Cincinnati Bengals on September 29, 2022. His head hit the ground and his upper extremities locked into a fencing response. As a result of these events, it was determined that Tagovailoa should have never returned to play after halftime against the Buffalo Bills and caused the NFL and NFLPA to update the concussion protocol so that if any player displays any signs of gross motor instability, they are not to return to play.

If a player is cleared by the Unaffiliated Neurotrauma Consultant (UNC), then they are allowed to play but will be monitored closely throughout the game. If a player is diagnosed with a concussion, then that player is not allowed back in the game. A return to play process is issued, which includes five steps, "1. Rest and recovery 2. Light aerobic exercise 3. Continued aerobic exercise/strength training 4. Football specific activities 5. Full football activity/clearance"

Almost every team has experienced a player who will "keep playing, then manage to stumble off the field, unnoticed by the coaches, cameras or press. He might take a breather for a series or two. But he can walk, so he wants to play. He gets back in the game and back to his teammates."

According to Johns Hopkins University, a study took place which "researchers recruited nine former NFL players who retired decades ago and who ranged in age from 57 to 74. The men had played a variety of positions and self-reported a wide range of concussions, varying from none for a running back to 40 for a defensive tackle."

=== Association football ===
Association football— also known as soccer— is a major source of sports-related concussions around the world. Even though 50–80% of injuries in football are directed to the legs, head injuries have been shown to account for between 4 and 22% of football injuries. There is the possibility that heading the ball could damage the head, as the ball can travel at 100 km/hour; although most professional footballers have reported that they experienced head injuries from colliding with other players and the ground. A multi-year study by the University of Colorado published in JAMA Pediatrics confirmed that athlete-to-athlete collisions that occur during heading, not impact with the ball itself, is generally the cause for concussion.

A 1992 Norwegian study of players of the Norway national football team determined that 3% of active and 30% of former players had persistent symptoms of concussions, and that 35% of the active and 32% of that former players had abnormal electroencephalogram (EEG) readings.

During the 2006-07 English Premier League season, Czech goalkeeper Petr Čech suffered from a severe concussion in a match between his club Chelsea and Reading. During the match, Reading midfielder Stephen Hunt hit Čech's head with his right knee, knocking the keeper out. Čech underwent surgery for a depressed skull fracture and was told that he would miss a year of playing football. Čech resumed his goalkeeper duties on 20 January 2007 in a match against Liverpool, now wearing a rugby helmet to protect his weakened skull.

According to Downs and Abwender in their 2002 article "Neuropsychological Impairment in Soccer Athletes", "participation in soccer may be associated with poorer neuropsychological performance, although the observed pattern of findings does not specifically implicate heading as the cause".

On 2 November 2013 in a match between Tottenham and Everton, Tottenham goal keeper Hugo Lloris sustained a blow to the head by on -coming player Romelu Lukaku's knee. The blow left Lloris knocked out on the ground. Reluctantly manager Andre Villas Boas decided to leave the player on after regaining consciousness and having passed a medical assessment. This broke the rules of the PFA, which state that any player who has lost consciousness must be substituted.

There has been widespread debate on protective headgear in soccer. Known as a sport associated with intricate footwork, speed, and well-timed passes, soccer also is classified as a high- to moderate-intensity contact/collision sport, with rates of head injury and concussion similar to those seen in football, ice hockey, lacrosse, and rugby. While the benefits of helmets and other head protection are more obvious in the other sports, the role of headgear in soccer was unclear as of 2013.

There are clear rules from FIFA regarding what to do when a player gets a concussion. FIFA's guidelines say that a player who has been knocked unconscious should not play again that day. The rules do however allow for "a transient alteration of conscious level" following a head injury, which says that a player can return to play following assessment by medical staff. The rules also state that a player who is injured with head damage is not to be played for five days.

=== Auto racing ===
The death of Dale Earnhardt at the 2001 Daytona 500, along with those of Kenny Irwin, Adam Petty and Tony Roper in 2000, and serious injuries sustained by Steve Park in a wreck in September 2001 at Darlington, led to NASCAR establishing policies to assist in driver safety such as the introduction of the Car of Tomorrow. Drivers were eventually instructed to wear both head and neck restraints, and SAFER barriers have been installed on racetrack walls, with foam-padded supports on each side of the helmet that allow a driver's head to move in the event of a crash. Despite this, 29 concussions were identified between 2004 and 2012.

In 2012, when Dale Earnhardt Jr. suffered a concussion from a crash at the end of the Good Sam Roadside Assistance 500 at Talladega, NASCAR considered adding baseline testing to its concussion policies. NASCAR was one of few motorsport organizations that did not have baseline testing, until 2014, when it began at the start of the seasons.

=== Baseball ===
Major League Baseball's (MLB) policy started in 2007, with injured players examined by a team athletic trainer on the field. On 29 March 2011, MLB and the Major League Baseball Players Association announced new protocols for the league's concussion policy. The new policy includes the following protocols:

- All teams are to run baseline neurocognitive testing for all players and umpires using the ImPACT (Immediate Post-Concussion Assessment and Cognitive Testing) system during spring training or after a player signing.
- If a player sustains head impact during a game, the play is stopped and the player's injury is assessed.
- A Certified Athletic Trainer (ATC) can evaluate and treat a player during a game.
- Trainers can remove the player from the game and to the clubhouse for further evaluation if the player has sustained a concussion.
- The Team Physician may also evaluate the player in the clubhouse. Player completes the SCAT3(Sport Concussion Assessment Tool, version 3)form in the clubhouse. If the player seems to not have sustained a concussion, he can return the game.The trainer can then evaluate the player throughout the entirety of the game after the injury occurs. If the player is thought to have a concussion, the team, the trainer, and team physician can determine whether to place the player on the 7-day or 10 day injured List (IL).
- Players on a 7-day concussion IL still unable to return to play after nine days are automatically transferred to a 10-day IL.

=== Basketball ===
In the 2005 high school basketball year, 3.6% of reported injuries were concussions, with 30.5% of concussions occurring during rebounds. Incidence rates for concussions in NCAA men's basketball is lower than NCAA women's basketball, at 0.16 concussion per 1,000 athletes compared to 0.22 per 1,000 athletes respectively. The difference is found mainly in competition activity compared to practice.

==== National Basketball Association policy ====
On 12 December 2011, the National Basketball Association (NBA) announced the establishment of a concussions policy for league. The players and staff must have annual education on topics surrounding concussion during play, including mechanisms of injury, signs, symptoms and interventions. The policies surrounding concussion management in NBA are:

- If concussion is suspected, the injured player is removed from the game immediately and monitored to ensure safety. A neurological exam is conducted by the team's physician or athletic trainer.
- For 24 hours after the primary evaluation, the player is monitored closely by the team's medical staff, so long as they are not diagnosed with a concussion. The player must complete at least one other evaluation before the next game or practice, whichever comes first.
- If the player is diagnosed with a concussion, they are prohibited from participating (on the same day or the next day) and must undergo the required return-to-participation protocol.
- The player, under direction of the team's medical staff, must avoid physical exertion and exposure to electronic devices, so as not to aggravate symptoms. Physical activity must be reintroduced gradually according to the medical staff's discretion.
- A physician must provide an assessment regarding the presence or absence of concussion within 24 hours of the incident. In addition, the Director of the NBA Concussion Program must be informed about the concussion evaluation.

=== Bicycling ===
Bicycling is a sport that places participants at risk of concussions and head injuries. Each year in the US there are approximately 80,000 bicycling related head injuries that require treatment in an emergency room. Roughly 33% of non-fatal bicyclist injuries are to the head. Many casual and even professional bicyclists don't take safety precautions seriously, and in 2016 more than half of bicyclists involved in fatal crashes were reported not wearing a helmet.

=== Boxing ===
Concussions are one of the most serious injuries that can occur from boxing. In an 80-year span from 1918 to 1998, there were 659 boxers who died from brain injury. Boxing involves repeated blows to the head and can result in chronic traumatic injury, especially in amateur boxing. Rates of concussion in boxing may be miscalculated because concussions do not always result from a knockout blow. Olympic boxers deliver punches with high impact velocity but lower head injury criterion and translational acceleration than in football impacts because of a lower effective punch mass. They cause proportionately more rotational acceleration than in football. Modeling shows that the greatest strain is in the midbrain late in the exposure, after the primary impact acceleration in boxing and football.

Muhammad Ali, possibly the most famous boxer of all time, was "diagnosed with 'a cluster of symptoms that resemble Parkinson's disease,' known as Parkinson's syndrome, which his doctor believed were caused by numerous blows to the head," which led to his death in 2016.

=== Cricket ===
Head injuries that result in concussion are a significant cause of injury in cricket, with the rate of concussion for elite male cricket estimated at an annual average of 0.9 per 100 players.

=== Gymnastics ===
As many skills in gymnastics involve flipping or a blind landing, incidence of head injury is increased. A 15-year study found an incidence of 1.7% for concussion and closed head injury for high school gymnasts.

=== Ice hockey ===
Ice hockey has also been known to have concussions inflict numerous players. Because of this, the NHL made hockey helmets mandatory in the 1979–80 NHL season. According to a data release by the National Academy of Neuropsychology's Sports Concussion Symposium, from 2006 to 2011, 765 NHL players were diagnosed with a concussion. At the Mayo Clinic Sports Medicine Center Ice Hockey Summit: Action on Concussion conference in 2010, a panel made a recommendation that blows to the head are to be prohibited, and to outlaw body checking by 11- and 12-year-olds. For the 2010–11 NHL season, the NHL prohibited blindside hits to the head, but did not ban hits to the face. The conference also urged the NHL and its minor entities to join the International Ice Hockey Federation, the NCAA and the Ontario Hockey League in banning any contact to the head.

==== National Hockey League policy ====
The National Hockey League's (NHL) concussion policy began in 1997, and players who sustain concussions are evaluated by a team doctor in a quiet room. In March 2011, the NHL adopted guidelines for the league's concussion policy. Before the adoptions, examinations on the bench for concussions was the minimum requirement, but the new guidelines make it mandatory for players showing concussion-like symptoms to be examined by a doctor in the locker room.

Dr. Paul Echlin and Dr. Martha Shenton of Brigham and Women's Hospital and other researchers, conducted a study where "Forty-five male and female Canadian university hockey players were observed by independent physicians during the 2011–2012 season. All 45 players were given M.R.I. scans before and after the season. The 11 who received a concussion diagnosis during the season were given additional scans within 72 hours, two weeks and two months of the incident. The scans found microscopic white matter and inflammatory changes in the brains of individuals who had sustained a clinically diagnosed concussion during the period of the study."

"We celebrate the big hit, we don't like the big head hit. There is an important distinction because we celebrate body-checking."

— NHL Commissioner Gary Bettman

The NHL has been criticized for allowing team doctors to determine whether an injured player can return to the ice, instead of independent doctors.

=== Rugby union ===
Concussions are also a significant factor in rugby union, another full-contact sport. In 2011, the sport's world governing body, World Rugby (then known as the International Rugby Board, or IRB), issued a highly detailed policy for dealing with injured players with suspected concussions. Under the policy, a player suffering from a suspected concussion is not allowed to return to play in that game. Players are not cleared to play after the injury for a minimum of 21 days, unless they are being supervised in their recovery by a medical practitioner. Even when medical advice is present, players must complete a multi-step monitoring process before being cleared to play again; this process requires a minimum of six days. In 2012, the IRB modified the policy, instituting a Pitchside Suspected Concussion Assessment (PSCA), under which players suspected of having suffered concussions are to leave the field for 5 minutes while doctors assess their condition via a series of questions. Players who pass the PSCA are allowed to return to play.

However, an incident during the third Test of the 2013 Lions tour of Australia led to criticism of the protocols. During that match, Australian George Smith clashed heads with the Lions' Richard Hibbard and was sent to pitchside. According to ESPN's UK channel, "despite looking dazed and confused, Smith passed the PSCA and was back on the field minutes later."

In 2013, former Scotland international Rory Lamont charged that the established concussion protocols could easily be manipulated. A key part of the protocols is the "Cogsport" test (also known as COG), a computer-based test of cognitive function. Each player undergoes the test before the start of a new season, and is then tested again on it after a head injury, and the results compared, to determine possible impairment. According to Lamont, some players deliberately do poorly on the pre-season test, so that they will be more likely to match or beat their previous results during play.

Lamont was also critical of the PSCA, noting:

The problem with the PSCA is a concussed player can pass the assessment. I know from first hand experience it can be quite ineffective in deciding if a player is concussed. It is argued that allowing the five-minutes assessment is better than zero minutes but it is not as clear cut as one might hope. Concussion symptoms regularly take 10 minutes or longer to actually present. Consequently the five-minute PSCA may be giving concussed players a license to return to the field.

The Concussion bin was replaced by the head bin in 2012 with the players assessment taking 10 minutes. If concussed the player must then recover by first returning to general activities in life, then progressing back to playing. Returning to play, the player must follow the Graduated Return to Play (GRTP) protocol, by having clearance from a medical professional, and no symptoms of concussion.

=== Lacrosse ===
In regards to men's and women's lacrosse, 8.6% of injuries were concussions that occurred during games. Both men and women's lacrosse athletes are nine times more likely to receive a concussion during a game rather than practice. 78.4% of the concussions were due to player-to-player collisions and 10.4% occurred from contact to the head with a stick.

== Youth sports ==
Many children and teenagers participate in sports and extracurricular activities that create a risk of a head injury or concussion, including basketball, cheerleading, soccer, and football. As a consequence, schools and youth sports groups may implement programs to reduce the risk of concussion, ensure prompt diagnosis and provision of medical care, and that young participants are not endangered by a premature return to sports.

In 2010, more high school soccer players suffered concussions than basketball, baseball, wrestling, and softball players combined, according to the Center for Injury Research and Policy.

In 2025, more children and teenagers that participated in collision sports such as rugby, ice hockey, and American football were found to have a higher rate of concussions across 21 observed sports.

The number of girls suffering concussions in soccer accounts for the second-largest amount of all concussions reported by young athletes. According to a study in the JAMA Pediatrics medical journal, many girls do not get necessary care and prevention regarding concussions, and 56 percent of players (or their families) reporting concussion symptoms never sought treatment. Studies show that girls are reporting nearly twice as many concussions as boys in the sports that they both play.

=== Effects ===
The symptoms of concussion may be physical, cognitive, and emotional. Symptoms vary between affected individuals, and symptoms be immediate or delayed.

=== Short-term ===
Possible signs of concussion that may appear in a student-athlete after a jolt to the head or body include:

- a dazed appearance
- confusion
- forgetfulness
- lack of confidence in actions
- clumsiness
- slower than usual
- loss of consciousness
- changes in mood, behavior, or personality, and
- inability to remember events before or after the hit

An injured student may report any of these signs, as well as sensitivity to light or sound, double vision, a headache, or other abnormal feelings. A student who has been diagnosed with a concussion may become frustrated, impatient, and angry about the situation.

=== Long-term ===
Concussions may have consequences that are not immediately apparent. Concussions can affect sleep quality and may cause sleep patterns to become inconsistent. Some nights an individual may sleep for an extended period of time, whereas in others sleep time can be short. With acute concussions, sleep occurs for longer durations when compared to subacute concussions. These irregular sleep patterns can have major health effects by making an individual susceptible to health concerns later on. Concussions have also been shown to increase the risk for mental issues such as depression, CTE, dementia, and other cognitive issues.

Concussions may also have long-term effects on the ability to learn and execute motor patterns. As compared to an individual with no concussions, due to damage to the brain resulting from concussion, a concussed individual may have reduced motor learning speeds and ability to progress in activity.

A term known as Post-concussive Symptoms, or PCS, can be found in many children under 18 years of age. PCS can impact the psychosocial functions and overall quality of life of the individual. Symptoms (headaches, dizziness, memory problems, etc.) can last from weeks to months. PCS is difficult to diagnose, so awareness of this syndrome is very necessary.

The consensus is that concussions have negligible effect on educational performance and school grades in youth. However, a recent study found that male students who sustained a sports-related concussion or sports-related fracture experienced significant drops in school grades post-injury, by approximately 1.73%. In addition, students with a concussion or head trauma missed significantly more days of school.

== Prevention efforts and technologies ==
Concussion prevention and management have seen many advances over the years that have aided in improving diagnostic methods, recovery, and rehabilitation regarding sports-related concussions. These advances include sideline concussion tools for assessing potential concussions and online testing to indicate head trauma. There have been numerous attempts at preventing concussions, such as the establishment of the PACE (Protecting Athletes Through Concussion Education) program, which works with the imPACT system used by every NFL and some NHL teams as of 2012. In 2008, the Arena Football League tested an impact monitor created by Schutt Sports called the "Shockometer", which is a triangular device attached to the back of football helmets that has a light on the device that turns red when a concussion occurs. Riddell has also created the Head Impact Telemetry System (HITS) and Sideline Response System (SRS) to record the frequency and severity of player hits during practices and games. On every helmet with the system, MX Encoders are implemented, which can automatically record every hit. Eight NFL teams had originally planned to use the system in the 2010 season, but the NFL Players Association ultimately blocked its use. Other impact-detection devices include CheckLight, by Reebok and MC10., and the online test providers ImPACT Test, BrainCheck, and XLNTbrain which establish cognitive function baselines against which the athlete is monitored over time. The CCAT online tool developed by Axon Sports is another test to assist doctors in assessing concussion.

In addition to force impact sensors used to assess traumatic brain injury, studies have been conducted to assess levels of biological markers for the presence of brain concussion. A variety of concurrently researched biomarkers have been associated with concussions, including S100B, Tau protein and glial fibrillary acid protein (GFAP). In 2018, the FDA approved Banyan Biomarkers Inc. to market devices involving the use of blood samples to evaluate concussions in adults. Banyan BTI (Brain Trauma Indicator) is a blood sample product that the FDA permitted for use before the decision to further assess head injury with CT scanning.

Neck collar technology is being explored for more widespread use in sports since 2019. The Q-Collar (previously known as Bauer Neuroshield) is an example of such a device. Neck collars are designed to gently constrict blood flow through the jugular vein in the neck, increasing fluid pressure in the head. The aim of this technology is to allow greater cushioning for neurological structures in the event of head trauma. Despite being unable to prevent serious traumatic brain injury, the device has been associated with a protective effect against microstructural changes in the brain after regular impact. However, further research is necessary to determine if the device's efficacy is substantiated. Since Health Canada's approval of the Q-Collar as a Class 1 Medical Devices, a few players in the Canadian Football League have used it in play. The FDA approved the collar after the manufacturer updated its manual to say that the device does not prevent concussion and that any claims of cognitive projection have not been demonstrated. In October 2025, a peer-reviewed investigation of the Q-Collar called for the FDA to review its approval of the product.

Efforts to manage concussion risk in youth and high school sports include online informational resources designed for coaches and parents. For example, the US Centre for Disease Control and Prevention created the HEADS UP program, a free online informational tool. It was launched in 2007, aiming to improve concussion identification and management. The online tool is available on CDC's website and has been used by 2 million individuals into 2019. The online resource was updated in 2016 and an interventional study conducted an assessment of the efficacy of the updated version.

A systematic review investigated the effects of policies on preventing sports injuries of children at school (ages 4–18) including 26 policies, 14 of which were from the US, and 10 of which were concussion-specific . Of the 10 studies specific to concussion, and 6 studies on guidelines on preventing concussions. The most common recommendation for primary prevention was the "education of athletes, colleagues and the public ...". Several other guidelines included rule changes, and the adherence of rules during games. Regarding helmets, there was consensus that they may not always protect against concussions. 2 guidelines recommended the development of concussion policies, or the incorporation of concussions into existing head injury policies. Another 2 guidelines recommended supervision of sports injuries. Further research into the effectiveness of guidance for schools on concussion prevention is needed.

A systematic review conducted by the Social Science Research Unit in London in 2007 concluded that athletic injuries for young people (ages 12–24) are reduced under supervision by a coach, however strong evidence for interventions to reduce sports-related injuries remains lacking. As such, the authors endorse the establishment of a national sports injury database in order to strengthen the base of evidence for interventions. The review outlined several interventions to prevent injuries specific to certain sports.

=== Rugby ===
Custom-fitted mouth guards were found to be effective in 4 of 5 studies done in a review. Having the playing season in the autumn/winter decreases the risk of injury, with the highest risk occurring in the summer. Another study found a change in the rules associated with tackles, scrums and mauls decrease the number of rugby union players suffering permanent quadriplegia.

=== Play in public playgrounds and sports fields ===
A UK-based community study found reductions in injury rates after the removal of monkey bars and increases in depth of the bark beneath equipment. A community intervention trial in New Zealand concluded the effectiveness of programs encouraging schools to reduce playground hazards. Another study found a change of environment in sports fields and playgrounds to reduce the incidence of injuries, including 'quick release bases', bases which detach easily from the ground upon contact with a player sliding, often used in recreational softball.

=== Baseball ===
Two reviews independently concluded that modified/'break-away bases' are more effective than standard bases in the prevention of sliding-related injuries.

=== Ice hockey ===
A review found regulatory approaches to be effective in reducing injury rates. E.g. mandatory use of protective equipment, implementation of new rules such as disallowing 'checking' from behind and 'high sticking' (raising the stick above shoulder height). A study found an inverse relationship between ice surface size and injury rate, and the use of correctly fitted helmets in injury reduction. Another review found an association between the use of face protectors and a decrease in facial injuries.

=== Alpine skiing ===
Ten low-quality studies in a review suggested the beneficial effects of lessons for beginners, mainly composed of children and young adults. Numerous studies have also suggested that while helmets can be of great use in reducing the risk and severity of head injury, they have little effect on the incidence of concussions. Sensation seeking and risk-taking behavior appear to be two domains that need to be addressed in order to optimize prevention efforts for traumatic brain injury in this sport.

=== Horse riding ===
A review found one multi-agency collaboration in publicising the risks of head injury effective in raising awareness and increasing sales of horse-riding helmets.

=== American football ===
A review concluded that the use of face protectors is effective in decreasing facial injuries. Moreover, it was concluded that mouth guards lead to less oral and head injuries. Conflicting evidence was found for the use of knee braces.

=== Bicycling ===
One approach to reduction of head injuries in bicycling involves developing and improving helmets in order to protect bicyclists in the event of an accident that results in a blow to the head. Other important prevention strategies include having proper supervision while riding and reducing ride speed. If it is a race setting, a prevention strategy is to limit the number of participants in the race to avoid any potential collisions.

== Media coverage ==
Recent documentaries and films, such as Concussion, portray the issue as a common cause of long-term neurological disability and the direct cause of a chronic traumatic encephalopathy (CTE), a neurodegenerative tauopathy found in individuals with a history of exposure to severe or repeated head trauma. The increasing concern over the potential long-term effects of sport-related concussions has heightened scrutiny of the practice of collision sports, particularly American football, with some individuals advocating for its abolition.

Sports concussion has been discussed in mainstream media over many years. Media coverage of professional athletes experiencing irreversible damage after repeated brain trauma and of the under-reported rates and risks of paediatric concussion have heightened awareness surrounding head injury in sports and recreation. The frequency of concussion in some of the world's biggest sports such as soccer, football, and rugby has increased the amount of media coverage.

Terminology in media for sports related concussions differs based on the geographical location. Articles in America used the descriptors "head trauma" (11.7%) and "brain trauma" (6.8%) the most, while articles from the UK and Ireland primarily mentioned "blow to head" (22.2%). Australia used the descriptors "head injury" (57.1%), and "brain injury" (28.6%) the most while New Zealand used "head knock" (46.7%), "head clash" (13.3%), and "brain damage" (13.3%). For the consequences of concussion, the UK and Ireland mentioned "Second Impact Syndrome "(22.2%), "Chronic Traumatic Encephalopathy" (22.2%) and "Parkinson's disease and other neurological conditions" (11.1%) the most. America most commonly mentioned "Alzheimer's, dementia and neurocognitive problems" (13.6%) and "Amyotrophic Lateral Sclerosis" (11.7%), while Canada saw the most frequent mention of "depression and suicide" (10.5%). Also, the use of misleading terms such as "mild concussion", "minor concussion" and "slight concussion" are commonplace in the media. Although media articles are often written by individuals (i.e. journalists) who are not medically trained, these articles have been found to potentially influence perceptions regarding concussion for a wide audience due to the global reach of the internet.

In 2012, film producer Steve James created the documentary film Head Games, interviewing former NHL player Keith Primeau, and the parents of Owen Thomas, who hanged himself after sustaining brain damage during his football career at Penn. The documentary also interviewed former athletes Christopher Nowinski, Cindy Parlow, and New York Times reporter Alan Schwarz, among other athletes, journalists, and medical researchers.

League of Denial was a 2013 book by sports reporters Mark Fainaru-Wada and Steve Fainaru about concussions within the NFL. The American documentary series Frontline covered the topic in two episodes, one based on the book and also called "League of Denial", and the other called "Football High" Political sports journalist Dave Zirin has also covered the topic in detail.

== Policies summary ==
=== Policies by major professional sports league ===
League	Year policy introduced	Year baseline testing began	Year current policy began	First step after injury	Person who approves/denies player to return	Person who decides player return
NFL	2007	2008	2009	Evaluation by medical team	Medical staff	Medical staff/Consultant
MLB	2007	2011	2007	Evaluation by an athletic trainer using National Association Guidelines	Medical staff	Head physician/Medical director
NBA	2011	2011	2011	Depends on team	Depends on team	Depends on team
NHL	1997	1997	2011	Neuropsychological evaluation by team doctor off rink	Team doctor	Team doctor
MLS	2011	2003	2011	Evaluation by medical team	Team physician	Team physician/Neuropsychologist
NASCAR	2003	2003	2003	Ambulance to infield care center	NASCAR	NASCAR

== See also ==
- Concussions in Australian sport
- Concussion grading systems
- Head injury criterion
- Shock data logger
- Impact sensor
- Sports-related traumatic brain injury
- List of NFL players with chronic traumatic encephalopathy
