= Sports-related traumatic brain injury =

Type of physical injury

A sports-related traumatic brain injury is a serious accident which may lead to significant morbidity or mortality. Traumatic brain injury (TBI) in sports are usually a result of physical contact with another person or stationary object, These sports may include boxing, gridiron football, field/ice hockey, lacrosse, martial arts, rugby, soccer, wrestling, auto racing, cycling, equestrian, rollerblading, skateboarding, skiing or snowboarding.

The most common TBIs in sports are cerebral contusions, second-impact syndrome concussions, chronic traumatic encephalopathy, and hematomas.

== Epidemiology ==
Sport TBI has been shown to be an important issue of global public health importance. A systematic review in 2020 showed that the incidence rate of TBI due to sports in hospitalized settings was between 3.5 to 31.5 per 100,000 persons, while a community-based analysis had a much higher incidence rate of 170 per 100,000 persons, which shows significant underestimation in the data from hospitals only. The majority of documented injuries are mild TBI, such as concussions. Men and adolescents have been shown to be at high risk of developing such conditions. Incidence rates across studies are not comparable due to varying definitions.

== Concussions ==
=== Definition ===
A concussion is defined as a stunning, damaging, or shattering effect from a hard blow; especially: a jarring injury of the brain resulting in disturbance of cerebral function. Concussions are also sometimes referred to as mTBI (Mild Traumatic Brain Injury). Concussions are injuries to the head which cause a temporary lapse in the normal operation of brain function. Concussions have many symptoms which could be displayed in a physical, psychological or emotional manner. Concussions symptoms can sometimes be hard to determine because they present in a subtle manner. A symposium was held in 2008 in Zurich, Switzerland, where a definition for concussions was developed. A concussion is now defined as "a complex pathophysiological process affecting the brain, induced by traumatic biomechanical forces."

There are five major features in conjunction with the definition:

- Concussion may be caused either by a direct blow to the head, face, or neck or elsewhere on the body with an "implosive" force transmitted to the head.
- Concussion typically results in the rapid onset of short-lived impairment of neurologic function that resolves spontaneously.
- Concussion may result in neuropathological changes, but the acute clinical symptoms largely reflect a functional disturbance rather than a structural injury.
- Concussion results in a graded set of clinical symptoms that may or may not involve loss of consciousness. Resolution of the clinical and cognitive symptoms typically follows a sequential course; however, in a small percentage of cases, post-concussive symptoms may be prolonged.
- No abnormality on standard structural neuroimaging studies is seen in concussion.

=== Signs and symptoms in sports ===
Signs and symptoms of concussions can be hard to determine because they may not present strongly and because they may not present for several hours after the incident has occurred. There are 4 categories that symptoms of a concussion can be classified within: physical, cognitive, emotional and sleep disturbance. The most common symptom is a headache as well as the feeling of being "fog like". Other, more subtle symptoms that can accompany headaches are emotional changes, irritability, slowed reaction times and drowsiness. Accompanying symptoms can include sensitivity to light, and noise, fatigue, dizziness, nausea and vomiting. The loss of consciousness is another identifiable characteristic of concussions but it is not a required symptom to diagnose it. The loss of consciousness occurs in only 10% of concussions, so it cannot be a reliable sign of a concussion. Other distinguishing characteristics of concussions are retrograde amnesia (loss of memory just prior to injury) and posttraumatic amnesia (impaired recall of time between the injury or resumption of consciousness and the point at which new memories are stored and retrieved).

=== Diagnosis in sports ===
There are many diagnostic tools and tests within sports. While the tests and scales may vary greatly from sport to sport, in the end, they effectively gain the same information regardless. The first initial assessment that should take place with every athlete found to be unconscious after head or neck trauma is the "ABC's" (airway, breathing, and circulation). There is an array of initial sideline evaluations that can be conducted after a possible concussive incident such as Maddocks questions, Standardized Assessment of Concussion (SAC), Balance Error Scoring System (BESS), or Sport Concussion Assessment Tool 2 (SCAT2). "The Maddocks questions are a brief set of questions to evaluate orientation as well as short and long-term memory related to the sport and current game. The questions are for sideline use only and are included in the SCAT2." The BESS test is a test based on an athlete's posture. There are 3 positions that the athlete tests in and a composite score of their errors over the 6 rounds of testing determines their scores. The SCAT2 uses both the BESS and SAC test. The SAC and SCAT-2 evaluations also contain symptoms checklists which can determine immediate cognitive and motor deficits, although many symptoms may present hours after the initial injury. 85% of certified athletic trainers use symptom checklists as part of a concussion assessment according to a recent survey.

Limited research of the test since its release from the Zurich Concussion statement has not allowed it to be verified as a successful testing method. The SAC however, does have sufficient evidence regarding its reliability, with researchers finding the test having a test-retest reliability of 53%. Many major professional sports organizations like the NFL, NHL, MLB and NBA have taken stronger looks at in game concussions through extensive studies to develop safer equipment and playing conditions for the players. In doing this they have developed their own initial sideline testing and concussion protocols. The NFL has adopted a standardized testing evaluation form based on the SCAT2 that it has implemented into all head and neck trauma incidents. In 2011 the NFL changed their concussion protocol and built upon their previous SCAT2 standardized test. "The new implementations include a focused screening neurological examination to exclude cervical spine and intracranial bleeding, assessment of orientation, immediate and delayed recall, concentration, as well as a balance evaluation."

Similarly, in 2011, the NHL adopted a new league-wide concussion protocol which would remove players from the bench, who may have possibly sustained head or neck trauma, and bring them back to an undisclosed quiet room. Players would be held there for a minimum of 15 minutes while completing tests similar of those to the NFL's testing protocol. In 2007 Major League Baseball also adopted a concussion program for umpires and players. In 2011 the policy was revised and 4 new features were added to the program. The first of which is that all umpires and players are to conduct baseline testing during spring training or after a player signing. Secondly, the SCAT2 has been adopted as the official sideline test for all MLB teams. Thirdly, a 7-day disabled list has been set up for players with concussions; players on the list for 14 days are moved to the 15-day disabled list. Lastly, the leagues medical director must clear all players who have suffered a concussion before they can return to play. Of the four major professional sports in the U.S., the NBA is the only league to have not adopted a sideline concussion policy. Each team and their medical staff proceed differently with their policies.

A study led by Marc Weisskopf, Cecil K., and Philip Drinker Professor of Environmental Epidemiology and Physiology at the Harvard Chan School looked at 6,000 athletes between the years of 1979 and 2013. During that period, there were 517 deaths among NFL players and 431 deaths among MLB players, translating into a 26% higher mortality rate among football players compared with baseball players. The findings showed that while NFL players died of neurodegenerative diseases at a higher rate than MLB players, both groups of athletes were more likely to die of cardiovascular disease than brain diseases. Overall NFL players had rates of neurodegenerative mortality that were three times higher than the general population.

=== Prognosis (short/long-term effects) ===
==== Short-term effects ====
Short-term effects deal mostly with Post-concussion Syndrome, which has no clearly defined definition. A person with a single concussive incident typically has a strong recovery rate. The most common Post-concussion symptom is a persistent headache which usually disappears within 1–2 weeks. Other common short-term effects include dizziness, vomiting, nausea, sensitivity to light and sound, irritability, cognitive lapses and memory impairment. 20-90% of the persons affected develop one symptom within a month of the incident, after 3 months 40% of the affected persons show at least 3 symptoms.

==== Long-term effects ====
Receiving multiple concussive incidents has long been known to cause a cumulative effect on the brain. It is also known that each successive concussion makes it easier to obtain another concussion in the future. Receiving multiple concussions can lead to long-term memory loss, psychiatric disorders, brain damage and other neurological disorders. There are no clearly defined guidelines for the retirement of an athlete, but it has been proposed that an athlete who sustains 3 concussive incidents in a single season or has post-concussion symptoms for more than 3 months should consider a lengthy period away from the sport. Especially with sports, when multiple concussions are received it is likely that a doctor will advise the player in question to avoid returning to sports where contact is possible. A specific research study targeting adolescents provides a slightly different view. In a meta-analysis of studies published in 2023 and carried out by Hou et al., it was determined that whereas adolescents who suffered from sports concussion showed cognitive impairment during the acute stage, none of those individuals demonstrated objective cognitive impairment after the injury if there were no repeat injuries. Short-term impairments of functions like visual memory and processing speed were found, but recovery time was within weeks. Persistent cognitive impairments were only observed in adolescents who had suffered multiple concussions.

==== Second-impact syndrome ====
Second-impact syndrome (SIS) occurs when an athlete sustains a second concussive incident before the symptoms of a prior concussive incident have fully healed. It does not take a severe concussion to cause SIS, even a mild grade concussion can lead to it. The condition is often fatal, and if death does not occur severe disability is probable. SIS is most often developed in young athletes, who are thought to be particularly vulnerable.

=== Prevention in sports ===
==== Helmets ====
Throughout the progression of contact sports, there have been continual innovations in protective gear, especially in terms of limiting head and neck traumas. The earliest known use of football helmets is documented in an 1893 Army–Navy game. Early helmets were typically only constructed of leather padding. Throughout the early 1900s helmets developed to include metal and plastics to better protect the player. In 1939 helmets became mandatory for college players, and a year later the NFL adopted the same policy. The increasing development and standardization of helmets along with rule changes that would protect players, would eventually cut down on head and neck traumas.

Like the NFL the NHL took steps to protecting players by mandating helmets in 1979. As of 2009 about 60% of NHL players wore a half visor for upper face protection.

In 2012 testing was conducted on a new type of helmet which battles rotational acceleration which is linked closer to concussions than typical impacts. This helmet is called the Multidirectional Impact Protection System (MIPS). This new generation of helmet was shown to decrease rotational acceleration by 55% compared to the traditional football helmet.

==== Mouth guards ====
Many sports including football, ice hockey, lacrosse, field hockey, and boxing implemented mandatory mouth guard policies during the 1960s and '70s. These policies were introduced to cut down on a player's chance of orofacial injury and concussions. Several studies conducted in many various professional and collegiate sports have yet to validate the claim that mouth guards cut down on concussions; although a study conducted by the NHL showed that symptom severity had significantly decreased with the use of mouth guards. In addition to equipment, there have been studies which have pointed to the effectiveness of modifying and enforcing rules as interventions which have the strongest evidentiary basis when it comes to preventing concussions in sports. According to a systematic review conducted in 2023, while equipment does play some role in minimizing mild TBI incidents, rule modification has emerged as the most effective preventive measure in existence. In addition to rule modification, the study also considered neuromuscular training programs and education campaigns as alternative prevention methods.

== Cerebral contusions ==
=== Epidemiology ===
Cerebral contusions are bruises to the brain caused by a direct blow to the head causing the brain to bounce against the inside of the skull and bruise brain tissue. The force of the blow causes either a tearing or twisting of the structure and blood vessels which hinders the ability of the receptors to send feedback to the brain. With the tearing or twisting of structure, the brain begins to swell and bleed. Since the brain cavity has no room to expand due to the swelling, bruises begin to form. Due to the nature of the injury, most of the contusive damage is found deeper in the brain.

In sports, most cerebral contusions are caused when the brain is either suddenly accelerated, decelerated, or strikes an immovable object. When the blow happens, brain tissue can be damaged, sometimes resulting in the need for hospitalization and surgery. A resection of the contused tissue is needed within surgery pending the severity of the incident. The highest rates of contusions occur in men between the ages of 15 and 24, somewhat due to their aggressive nature. If a person sustains a contusion one time, they are more likely to sustain a repeated one.

(see cerebral contusion for more information)

=== Signs and symptoms in sports ===
In the heat of a game, it may be hard to see or feel symptoms relating to cerebral contusions. If any of these signs are visible or as an athlete, you feel them, remove yourself from competition immediately. Cerebral contusions and other injuries can occur in any sport, not just in the traditional "collision" sports. The most popular sport to cause cerebral contusions is American football due to the drastic acceleration/deceleration of the brain.

==== Immediate signs of a cerebral contusion ====
- Headache
- Nausea
- Slurred speech
- Restlessness
- Pupil dilation
- Memory loss
- Personality shift
- Seizures

==== Post-game symptoms ====
- Loss of consciousness
- Severe headaches
- Coma (due to loss of consciousness)

If any of these symptoms are felt or noticed, a hospital visit is needed where further machine testing is done. In boxing, the rapid deceleration of the brain after an impact causes the symptoms to progress much faster or at a more traumatic rate. Doctors ringside monitor a boxer's attitude and brain function throughout the fight and are able to stop the match following startling news.

=== Diagnosis in sports ===
Contusions are identified with two forms of diagnosis: acceleration of the brain and direct trauma. A direct trauma injury is much more severe than an acceleration injury (in most cases) and requires much more intensive diagnosis and testing. The full extent of the injury may not be known until testing done in a hospital is complete.

In football, medical trainers are well versed to diagnose symptoms pertaining to a traumatic brain injury. They are not, however, able to determine what type of injury it is or the extent the injury stems. Football trainers can medically clear or not clear players based on brain injury symptoms. If a trainer feels that certain symptoms exist that are similar to that of cerebral contusions, they will take the player out of the game and rush them to the hospital. Upon admission into the hospital, a CT scan will be ordered. A CT scan is the quickest method to diagnose cerebral contusions because it can be performed immediately and have fairly exact findings. The best method, as suggested by medical doctors, is an MRI because they present more sensitive and accurate findings. MRI's, however, must be scheduled and cannot be completed immediately following the injury. MRI's also take a long time to perform where the injury a player sustained may get worse within that time frame.

==== Case study example ====
History: The individual is possibly unconscious when examined by medical personnel on the field. A common symptom is prolonged unconsciousness (coma), however this player reports headache, dizziness, nausea, vomiting, and weakness of the extremities (paresis) and makes inappropriate responses to questions.

Physical exam: The individual's level of consciousness is disturbed. A neurological examination may not reveal any localizing signs. The individual with no other serious injuries than cerebral contusion will not have a fractured skull or any signs of opening or penetration of the skull.

Tests: Skull x-rays check for a fracture. CT or MRI detect any bleeding in the skull. The Glasgow Coma Scale classifies the severity of brain injury, with a score of 15 as normal and progressively lower scores indicating greater neurologic injury to the brain.

After testing is completed, doctors will make an estimate on the extent of the injury and possible recovery time. If cranial bleeding and swelling is minor, a short hospital stay (up to a week) is needed with close observation. If bleeding is severe, the player may be treated as a patient with a severe head injury (with surgery as the main option). This process requires the patient to be admitted into an intinsive care unity with close monitoring of blood levels and brain activity.

=== Prognosis (short/long-term effects) ===
The effects of a cerebral contusion depend on the cause of the injury and what part of the brain was most affected. Outcomes vary from minor injuries that require short recovery times to severe injuries that can lead to death. Short-term effects of cerebral contusions can range from a mild headache to feeling lightheaded for a few days. Most short-term effects match that of a mild head injury while long-term effects can be much more serious. Most long-term injuries require surgery, rehabilitation, and close monitoring. In small cases, cerebral contusions can lead to death (about 15 per 100,000 people). If a cerebral contusion leads to a coma, recovery can be very long and rehabilitation extensive. If the coma is long, the probability of dying or permanent neurological damage is very possible.

=== Prevention in sports ===
Rules exist within each sport to help prevent cerebral contusions and traumatic brain injuries. However, individual athletes are the best prevention against their own injuries. In a game, athletes notice when they have the symptoms of a cerebral contusion and should take themselves out of the game. It may be hard for medical personnel or coaches to notice when a player has a traumatic brain injury, so it is in the player's best interest to be removed from play. In hockey, traumatic brain injuries constitute 10%-15% of all head injuries. With the high percent of injuries being traumatic, extensive design improvements have been made to helmets. These improvements reduce the risk of cerebral contusions by providing more padding around the skull and a chin strap that keeps the helmet snug. In baseball, major improvements to helmets have been made to protect batters from the impact a baseball can have when hitting their head. Helmets, before this major improvement, were designed to withstand a velocity of 70 mph from a pitch or foul ball. Since the company Rawlings' new design, helmets can withstand a velocity of 100 mph and have further padding around the softer parts on the side of the skull. American football players have sued the National Football League (NFL) for $1 billion for misrepresenting the long-term health impacts associated with on-field head injuries. However, even if a sports organization has an accurate understanding of the value of injury prevention techniques, the management team (such as coaching staff and medical staff) may fail to communicate this knowledge effectively to elite athletes. Previous studies argued that there is no one-size-fits-all program contributing to better knowledge or understanding of injury consequences to elite athletes.

== Dementia pugilistica (punch-drunk syndrome) ==
=== Epidemiology ===
A syndrome affecting boxers that is caused by cumulative cerebral injuries and is characterized by impaired cognitive processes (as thinking and remembering), Parkinsonism, impaired and often slurred speech, and slow poorly coordinated movements especially of the legs. Dementia Pugilistica, more commonly known as "Punch Drunk Syndrome", is a degenerative brain disorder resulting from head trauma. Dementia Pugilistica (DP) is typically associated with the sport of boxing; although symptoms of DP may appear immediately after a single traumatic brain injury, they are typically described following the cessation of exposure to chronic brain injury.

=== Signs and symptoms in sports ===
Some of the subjective symptoms experienced after a Knockout are headaches, tinnitus, forgetfulness, impaired hearing, dizziness, nausea and impaired gait. Approximately ten percent of these active boxers reported constantly experiencing forgetfulness, headaches and other symptoms. Symptoms can be progressive and can develop late into a boxer's career or possibly years into retirement. Some of the earlier symptoms of "punch drunk syndrome" are noticeable in extremities; such as trembling hands or feet, or an instability in equilibrium. Signs of chronic brain damage can also affect irritability, paranoia and cause violent outbursts.

=== Diagnosis in sports ===
Dementia pugilistica is difficult to diagnose until the later stages of a boxer's life. Symptoms are not apparent until boxer's are years into retirement. The damage is done in four primary sites of the brain: the septal regions, the cerebellum, the substantia nigra and the neurons. The septa end up separated and torn apart while the ventricles become enlarged. "The main motor pathways in the cerebellum and substantia nigra are affected, as well as the foramen magnum." Lastly, the neurons in the brains of boxer's have a "bizarre tendency for many neurons, mainly in the deep temporal grey matter, to develop abnormal neurofibrils called Alzheimer tangle. The most successful way to diagnose DP is through magnetic resonance imaging techniques, more commonly known as an MRI. Segmented inversion recovery ratio imaging technique is based on the ratio of a white matter suppressed image and gray matter suppressed image. "The (SIRRIM) technique improves the differentiation of gray matter from white matter and is sensitive to detect abnormalities of intracellular space, including changes during cellular death."

=== Prognosis (short/long-term effects) ===
Multiple studies have concluded that there is neurological evidence of damage to pyramidal, extrapyramidal and cerebellar systems with associated psychosis, memory loss or dementia, personality change and social instability. After fighting, boxers show raised cerebrospinal fluid levels of neurofilament light chain and total tau then they did after three months with no boxing.

=== Prevention in sports ===
Protective measures have been taken especially in amateur boxing, such as the wearing of a head guard, more heavily cushioned gloves (weighing 10 ounces in amateur boxing and 8 ounces in professional boxing), shorter and fewer rounds, the addition of the 'outclassed rule' (where the point difference becomes greater than 20), and the option for the boxer to interrupt the fight itself.

== Hematoma ==
=== Epidemiology ===
A hematoma is a localized collection of blood that gathers outside the blood vessels in an area it does not belong. Specifically a hematoma is tissue damage due to acceleration or deceleration from unrestricted movement, in which the result is shearing of the brain tissue. Two types of hematomas occurring within the brain are: subdural and extradural hematomas, which are classified as a traumatic brain injury (TBI). When a direct blow to the head occurs, there is bruising to the brain and damage to the internal tissue and blood vessels. Additionally, the jarring of the brain against the skull causes hematomas. Injuries commonly occur during contact sport such as boxing, football, basketball, motor cycling, scuba diving, mountaineering, hang gliding, skydiving, and horseback riding. Council on scientific affairs. Following a serve brain injury or a skull fracture one of the two hematomas may occur. An extradural hematoma is a TBI where blood collects between the inside of the skull and the dura, the thick outer covering of the brain. A subdural hematoma is a localized collection of blood under the surface of the dura matter. Blood collects on the outermost layer of the brain and creates an intracranial pressure.

=== Signs and symptoms in sports ===
Generally, symptoms for hematomas are confused speech, difficulty with balance or walking, headaches, lethargy or confusion, nausea or vomiting, numbness, seizures, slurred speech, visual disturbances, and weakness. For example, an athlete who experiences a subdural hematoma will experience loss of consciousness with little or no lucidity. Pupils are often dilated or unequal. Additionally, hemiparesis, seizure activity, and vomiting, may be apparent. An epidural hematoma typically results in serve a headache which is followed by a brief loss of consciousness and variable levels of lucidness. This may last for several hours while the brain function deteriorates. If untreated epidural hematoma causes increased blood pressure, shortness of breath, damage to brain function and may result in death.

=== Diagnosis in sports ===
Subdural and epidural hematomas are serious conditions and should be immediately diagnosed and treated by a physician. Hematomas may not show the full extent of the problem initially after the head injury, but it may be revealed after comprehensive medical evaluation and diagnostic test. Diagnostic test may include: blood test, x-ray, computed tomography scan (CT/CAT scan), electroencephalogram (EEG), and magnetic resonance imaging (MRI). The two most important diagnostic tests are the CT scan and the MRI. The CT scan reveals evidence of blood within the skull, fractures, and signs of compression on the brain from the hematoma. The MRI is a more thorough evaluation of injuries to the brain tissue. Yet, an MRI cannot take place if the injured patient is in a confused state. Small hematomas may not require surgery if there is no pressure on the brain and minimal symptoms. Small hematomas may be monitored closely to ensure the hematoma is not enlarging and resolved properly. A large hematoma larger than 1 cm at its thickest point produces severe headaches and brain function deterioration requires immediate surgery by a neurosurgeon. Surgery reduces the pressure within the brain and stops the bleeding.

=== Prognosis (short/long-term effects) ===
The most crucial aspect for recovery in patients with severe hematomas is rapid diagnosis and appropriate treatment. Once the clot has been removed the intracranial pressure is monitored for several days. Conditions which are also monitored after surgery are seizures, clot accumulation, and infection. If complications do occur, sometime the hematoma needs to be re-drained. Additional complications following a surgical or nonsurgical treatment may include temporary or permanent weakness, numbness, difficulty speaking, memory loss, dizziness, headache, anxiety, difficulty concentrating, seizures, and/or brain herniation. The most helpful predictors of the treatment outcome is the glasgow coma scale (GCS). This is a standardized pupil response assessment of the neurologic status of the patient. GCS helps assess many different types of head injuries and predicts how a patient will recover following a hematoma. Factors such as elevated intracranial pressure, increased patients age, and abnormal GCS results lead to a poor prognosis. The mortality rate following a hematoma could be as high as 80% and survivors many not regain the same pre-injury function. Subdural and epidural hematomas are serious injuries and recovery varies widely depending on the severity of the hematoma. Severity depends on type and location of the injury, the size of the blood collection, and how quickly treatment is obtained. Hence, it is difficult to determine when an athlete can return to sports after his/her injury. A variety of multidisciplinary people such as sports medicine physicians, neurologist/neurosurgeons, athletic trainers, coaches, and family require input. If an athlete is approved to return, he or she is required to complete asymptomatic at rest and with exertion. The athlete also has to clear a CT scan indicating the hematoma has entirely resolved. Lastly, the athlete needs to be slowly brought back into the sport with close monitoring to be sure the symptoms do not recur.

=== Prevention in sports ===
Preemptive measures include using safety equipment to reduce your risk of a head injury. Equipment examples are hard hats, bicycle or motorcycle helmets, and seat belts. To reduce the risk of hematomas, factors to avoid are taking anticoagulant medication (blood thinners, such as aspirin), long-term abuse of alcohol, repeated falls, and reoccurring head injury.

== See also ==
- Concussions in sport
- Sports injury
- Impact monitor
