= Motion amplification =

Motion amplification is an optical-visual technique for detecting and visualizing vibrations and resonances. It works by detecting small variations in pixels from video that are otherwise difficult to perceive, and amplifying these variations to produce a visualization that makes it easier to perceive small movements, including transients. In this way, one can get clues about the sources of backlash, run-out and structural weaknesses in machines and structures.

It can be a tool for more targeted work by preventing wear by identifying necessary adjustments, avoiding downtime by replacing wearparts in a timely manner before failure occurs, or to help with fault detection during repairs. In industry, motion amplification is particularly used for the inspection of rotating equipment such as fans, pumps and engines. In healthcare, motion amplification can be used in rehabilitation to improve movement patterns in patients. An example of a patented commercial motion amplification product is the Iris M from RDI Technologies.

== See also ==
- Backlash, looseness between two mechanical components due to clearance
- Data logger, recording device
- Pattern recognition, field within machine learning
- Shock and vibration data logger, device recording shocks or vibrations over time
- Shock detector, device which indicates whether a physical shock or impact has occurred
