= Alex Guerrero (alternative medicine) =

Canadian alternative medicine practitioner (born 1965)

- Born: 1965 (age 60–61)
- Occupations: Alternative medicine practitioner, writer

Alejandro "Alex" Guerrero (born 1965) is an Argentine alternative medicine practitioner, pseudoscientist, and alkaline diet advocate. He is best known for his infomercials that contained alternative health claims and his work with professional football players, including Tom Brady and many other current and former New England Patriots players.

== Education and early career ==
Guerrero received a master's degree in traditional Chinese medicine from Samra University of Oriental Medicine in Los Angeles, California, an institution that closed in 2010 after the state of California dissolved the Bureau of Private Postsecondary and Vocational Education board in 2007, which had provided the school's accreditation.

After graduating, Guerrero opened his own health treatment practice in 1996, and soon began working with individual professional athletes.

== 2004 book ==
In 2004, Guerrero wrote a book called In Balance for Life: Understanding & Maximizing Your Body's pH Factor. The book promoted what he called a "nutritional supplement program that will take your health to the next level", with a "14-Day Diet Plan to quick-start your journey to vibrant vitality". In the book, he said the principles of the program were "easy to understand, and even easier to implement", and said "In fact, the principles that support it have been scientifically verified time and time again by researchers throughout the world. For the most part, however, they remain all but ignored by conventional and alternative health-care providers alike. As a result, our society is increasingly burdened with health-care problems." The book referred to "the important role that the pH Factor plays in health and overall balance of the body" and said that "unhealthy pH levels―a disruption of proper acid-alkaline balance―are at the root of all disease conditions".

== Infomercials and sanctioning by the FTC ==
In 2005, Guerrero was sanctioned by the U.S. Federal Trade Commission for falsely presenting himself as a doctor and claiming to be able to cure cancer, AIDS, multiple sclerosis, diabetes, arthritis, and Parkinson's disease using a dietary supplement called "Supreme Greens". He had made these claims in infomercials on the channels Spike TV and We TV. He claimed to have conducted extensive scientific studies of the benefits of his program with 200 patients that had been diagnosed as terminally ill before his treatments, but he later admitted that no such studies existed. The FTC fined him and barred him for life from ever again presenting himself as a doctor or from ever again marketing Supreme Greens or any substantially similar product as an effective treatment for any disease. Barrie Cassileth, Ph.D., the founder of the Integrative Medicine Service at the Memorial Sloan Kettering Cancer Center, who helped in the FTC investigation, referred to his practices as "just out and out quackery". She said that a major danger of such useless treatments is that they may delay patients from seeking proper evidence-based medical care, and that "this is fatal for many patients". She said "The organizations and people who make these claims and produce these false treatments really are doing something horrific."

He later founded a new company called 6 Degree Nutrition, which marketed various nutritional supplements including a product called Neurosafe. Neurosafe was called "a seatbelt for your brain", and was claimed to protect its users "from the consequences of sports-related traumatic brain injury". The product was advertised as being endorsed by prominent professional football players that had experienced concussions, with a claim that "When used consistently, NeuroSafe helps to dramatically improve recovery from head trauma by providing the brain the nutrients it needs to repair itself." Wes Welker, a wide receiver who had suffered repeated concussions, was quoted as saying "NeuroSafe is essential. It keeps me safe. I've seen what concussions do to people. With NeuroSafe I know it's protecting what my helmet can't." Champion quarterback Tom Brady was quoted saying "NeuroSafe makes me feel comfortable that if I get a concussion I can recover faster and more fully. There is no other solution on the market today that can do what NeuroSafe does. It's that extra level of protection that gives me comfort when I'm out on the field." The FTC intervened again in 2012, reaching a settlement with Guerrero that resulted in closure of the company and the cessation of the marketing of the product.

The Boston Globe reported that Guerrero also had "a long history of financial troubles, bankruptcies, and legal entanglements". He was sued twice for allegedly defrauding investors in his health product business enterprises of hundreds of thousands of dollars in investment funds, and resolved the cases with settlements under undisclosed terms.

== Work with football players ==
Guerrero has treated a number of professional football players, and is especially closely associated with Tom Brady, a former NFL quarterback who previously played for the New England Patriots and the Tampa Bay Buccaneers and is widely regarded as the greatest quarterback of all time. Brady refers to Guerrero as his "body coach" and "body engineer", and has said Guerrero "has been a huge part of what I do" and is a "huge, huge reason why I'm still playing". In addition to Brady, Guerrero has worked with many different players for the Patriots, particularly including Danny Amendola, Jacoby Brissett, Julian Edelman, Jimmy Garoppolo, Rob Gronkowski, Duron Harmon, Chris Hogan, Ty Law, and Willie McGinest. In December 2017, it was estimated that Guerrero was treating about 20 of the then-current Patriots players. The dietary and training techniques espoused by Guerrero and Brady have also been influential with other NFL players outside of the Patriots. As in Guerrero's 2004 book, aspects of Guerrero's dietary guidelines are phrased in terms of pH balance, with Brady saying he has a primarily alkaline diet that is 80 percent alkaline and 20 percent acidic. The diet is mostly vegan while avoiding foods that are claimed to cause inflammation, including tomatoes, peppers, mushrooms, and eggplants.

Earlier in his career, Guerrero also worked with LaDainian Tomlinson and Keenan McCardell of the San Diego Chargers. Wide receiver T. J. Houshmandzadeh, then with the Cincinnati Bengals, was treated by Guerrero during the same time frame.

Guerrero and Brady have become collaborators and business partners in various ventures branded as "TB12" (with "TB" being the initials for Tom Brady, and 12 his jersey number). Together they created a peak performance website TB12Sports.com and opened a facility in 2013 called the TB12 Sports Therapy Center next to Gillette Stadium, the home of the New England Patriots. Guerrero helped Brady develop a health program that Brady wrote about in a 2017 book, The TB12 Method. Guerrero and Brady also developed "The TB12 Nutrition Manual", a line of TB12-branded snacks, protein bars, and prepared meals, and a line of TB12 workout gear and clothing (including "recovery pajamas" that are said to help the wearer recover from physical exertion and trauma). The practices of Guerrero and the TB12 Center were investigated by several Massachusetts state agencies in 2013, but the agencies took no enforcement action, partly due to regulatory exceptions granted for work that was considered massage therapy. In 2014, after an allegation that he was practicing physical therapy without a license, he was sent a letter instructing him to abide by state regulations when supervising the work of licensed therapists.

Although Guerrero has treated many members of the New England Patriots, there has been substantial friction with the Patriots' management and training staff over his involvement, and in December 2017, the head coach Bill Belichick and the Patriots staff stripped Guerrero of many of his team privileges. However, there has been no such friction in Tampa Bay, with Guerrero treating multiple players at a facility near Raymond James Stadium and Brady and Gronkowski treated on-site during games.

Dr. Jessica Flynn, a specialist in sports medicine at the Lahey Hospital & Medical Center, criticized Guerrero's practices in 2017, saying that although she truly believes "there is a lot of good going on at TB12", she is troubled that Guerrero has implied that doctors don't really care about the functional outcomes for their athletic patients. In an otherwise-positive account of one writer's experience, Guerrero had reportedly told his patient that "your surgeon's number one goal is to protect his surgery site. He doesn't care if you ever run again. He doesn't care if you want to climb Mount Everest." Moreover, Flynn said she is concerned that at TB12 "they continue to profit from non-proven treatments, supplements, and other therapies and none of those profits seem to be invested in studying their efficacy." She said "Guerrero functions in a different world than doctors. He doesn't have to prove his therapies work, or even that they are safe."

In an article on the sports website Deadspin, the sports writer Tom Ley used even more harsh language. He called Guerrero a "dangerous quack guru" and said "In a just world, Guerrero would be shunned from public life and quickly identified as a scam artist who has preyed on desperate and even dying people when making any attempt to present himself as a credible fitness guru."

In July 2018, Guerrero became the subject of inquiries about his association with the receiver Julian Edelman, and Edelman's suspension for using performance-enhancing drugs. Guerrero issued a statement saying "Here at our facility, we take a natural, holistic, appropriate and, above all, legal approach to training and recovery for all of our clients. And anyone who would suggest otherwise is irresponsible, and just plain wrong." When a reporter said to Brady that a lot of people thought Edelman's violation might be connected to Guerrero, Brady said "It's just ridiculous. I'm out. See you guys," and abruptly ended the press conference. Brady reacted similarly a month later when asked about Guerrero in late August. During a weekly interview segment that Brady regularly held with WEEI radio, Brady was asked about whether Guerrero was traveling with the team and about the relationship between Guerrero and team management. Brady said he didn't want to talk in detail about the topic, and when the reporter asked follow-up questions, he said "Yeah. Alright, guys. Have a great day. I'll talk to you later," and hung up the phone.

== Selected publications ==
- In Balance for Life: Understanding and Maximizing Your Body's pH Factor (Square One, 2004) ISBN 978-0757002649
