= Axon Sports =

- Industry: Sports training, Cognitive studies
- Founded: 2010; 16 years ago
- Area served: Worldwide
- Website: http://www.axonsports.com

Axon Sports, LLC produces cognitive training products for athletes. These tools are intended to accelerate skill acquisition and develop cognitive skills for success on the field of play. Axon Sports' training products have been adopted by professional teams, prominent USA NCAA Division I athletic departments and elite high performance training centers in both the United States and the United Kingdom.

== Company history and corporate structure ==
Axon Sports LLC launched in August 2010 in the United States as a joint venture between CogState Ltd and Quixote Investment, a Portland, Oregon-based investment group. Their first product was the Computerised Cognitive Assessment Tool (CCAT), an online product to help medical practitioners determine whether an athlete had suffered concussion and to assist them in making return to play decisions. The CCAT has been adopted by three major professional leagues in the United States, as well as Rugby Football Union, Rugby League Football, the Australian Football League and the Professional Jockeys Association. At the consumer level, many school districts, youth sports associations and leading medical providers use the CCAT to safeguard the cognitive health of athletes of all ages and further prevention of concussions in sport. In 2011, Cogstate acquired the remainder of the shares of Axon Sports from Quixote Investment, making Axon a wholly owned but independently operated subsidiary of CogState.

== Cognitive training ==
Axon Sports cognitive training products are grounded in principles of neuroscience. Current products focus on the development of sport-specific high speed decision making (e.g. Axon Sport Baseball Hitting Assessment). Through high speed repetition, occlusion and expert feedback, the products are intended to help athletes accelerate development of cognitive skills. The principles of pattern recognition, 'chunking' and the automatization of decision making are all established pillars of expert performance.

Axon has also released two iPad apps (Axon Athletic Brain Trainer), one for baseball and the other for American Football.

== Axon Science Board ==
Axon's product development is guided by the neuroscientists and learning specialists on the Axon Science Board. Current board members include:

- Dr. Peter Fadde, Associate Professor of Learning Systems Design & Technology, Southern Illinois University
- Dr. Scott Frey, Director, Brain Imaging Center Adjunct Professor in the Departments of Neurology, University of Missouri
- Dr. Len Zaichkowsky, Professor of Education and Graduate Medical Sciences, Boston University
- Dr. Maruff, Chief Science Officer, Cogstate and Professor, Centre for Neuroscience University of Melbourne
- Dr. Paul Ward, Professor of Applied Cognitive Psychology, University of Huddersfield

== Partnerships ==
Axon Sports is partnered with a wide variety of organizations ranging from high performance training centers, sports equipment companies and several sporting organizations and governing bodies. Partners as of 2013 include Athletes Performance Inc., GlaxoSmithKline, Easton, and US Youth Soccer.
