= Random vibration =

Type of motion in mechanical engineering

In mechanical engineering, random vibration is vibration motion which does not repeat exactly after a certain period of time. It is non-deterministic, meaning that the exact behavior at a future point in time cannot be predicted, but general trends and statistical properties can be known. The randomness is a characteristic of the excitation or input, not the mode shapes or natural frequencies. Some common examples include an automobile riding on a rough road, wave height on the water, or the load induced on an airplane wing during flight. Structural response to random vibration is usually treated using statistical or probabilistic approaches. Mathematically, random vibration is characterized as an ergodic and stationary process.

The acceleration spectral density (ASD) or power spectral density (PSD) are the usual ways to specify random vibrations. The root mean square acceleration (G_{rms}) is the square root of the area under the ASD curve in the frequency domain. The G_{rms} value is typically used to express the overall energy of a particular random vibration and is a statistical value used in mechanical engineering for structural design and analysis.

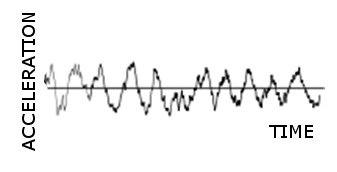
Typical random vibration in the time domain

== Random vibration testing ==
Test specifications can be established from real environment measurements using an ASD envelope or a fatigue damage equivalence criterion (Extreme response spectrum and Fatigue damage spectrum). Random vibration testing is one of the more common types of vibration testing services performed by vibration test labs. Some of the more common random vibration test standards are MIL-STD-810, RTCA DO-160, and IEC 60068-2-64.

== See also ==
- Random noise
