= Extreme response spectrum =

Certain theory

The Extreme Response Spectrum (ERS) (or Maximum Response Spectrum (MRS)) is defined as a curve giving the value of the highest peak of the response of a linear Single Degree of Freedom System (SDOF system) to vibration, according to its natural frequency, for a given damping ratio. The response is described here by the relative movement of the mass of this system in relation to its support. The x-axis refers to the natural frequency and the y-axis to the highest peak multiplied by the square of the quantity (2 π x natural frequency), by analogy with the relative displacement shock response spectrum.

The severity of a vibration can be evaluated by calculating the stresses on a mathematical or finite element model of the structure and, for example, comparison with the ultimate stress of the material. This is the method used to dimension the structure. Generally, however, the problem is instead to evaluate the relative severity of several vibrations (vibrations measured in the real environment, measured vibrations with respect to standards, establishment of a specification etc.). This comparison would be difficult to carry out if one used a fine model of the structure and besides, this is not always available, in particular at the stage of the development of the specification of dimensioning.

A solution consists of applying the vibration under consideration to a “standard” mechanical system, which thus does not claim to be a model of the real structure, composed of a support and N linear one-degree-of-freedom resonators, each one comprising a mass, a spring and a damping device.

A vibration A is considered as more severe than a vibration B if it produces a highest relative displacement (i.e. a highest stress) on this SDOF system than the vibration B.

An ERS is generated from a vibration signal using the following process:
1. Choose a damping ratio for the ERS to be based on;
2. Assume a hypothetical Single Degree of Freedom System, with a given natural frequency (Hz);
3. Calculate (by time base simulation or from a Power Spectral Density (PSD) of the vibratory signal) the highest instantaneous relative displacement experienced by the mass element of this SDOFs at any time during exposure to the vibration in question. Plot this value multiplied by the square of (2 π x natural frequency) against the natural frequency of the hypothetical system;
4. Repeat steps 2 and 3 for other values of the natural frequency.

The resulting plot is called an Extreme response spectrum.

== Note ==
Vibrations can damage a mechanical system as a result of several processes, among which are:

- the exceeding of characteristic instantaneous stress limits (yield stress, ultimate stress etc.)
- the damage by fatigue following the application of a large number of cycles.

ERS is used according to the first criterion. The second is considered with the fatigue damage spectrum (FDS).
