= Shock detector =

Indicator of physical shock or impact

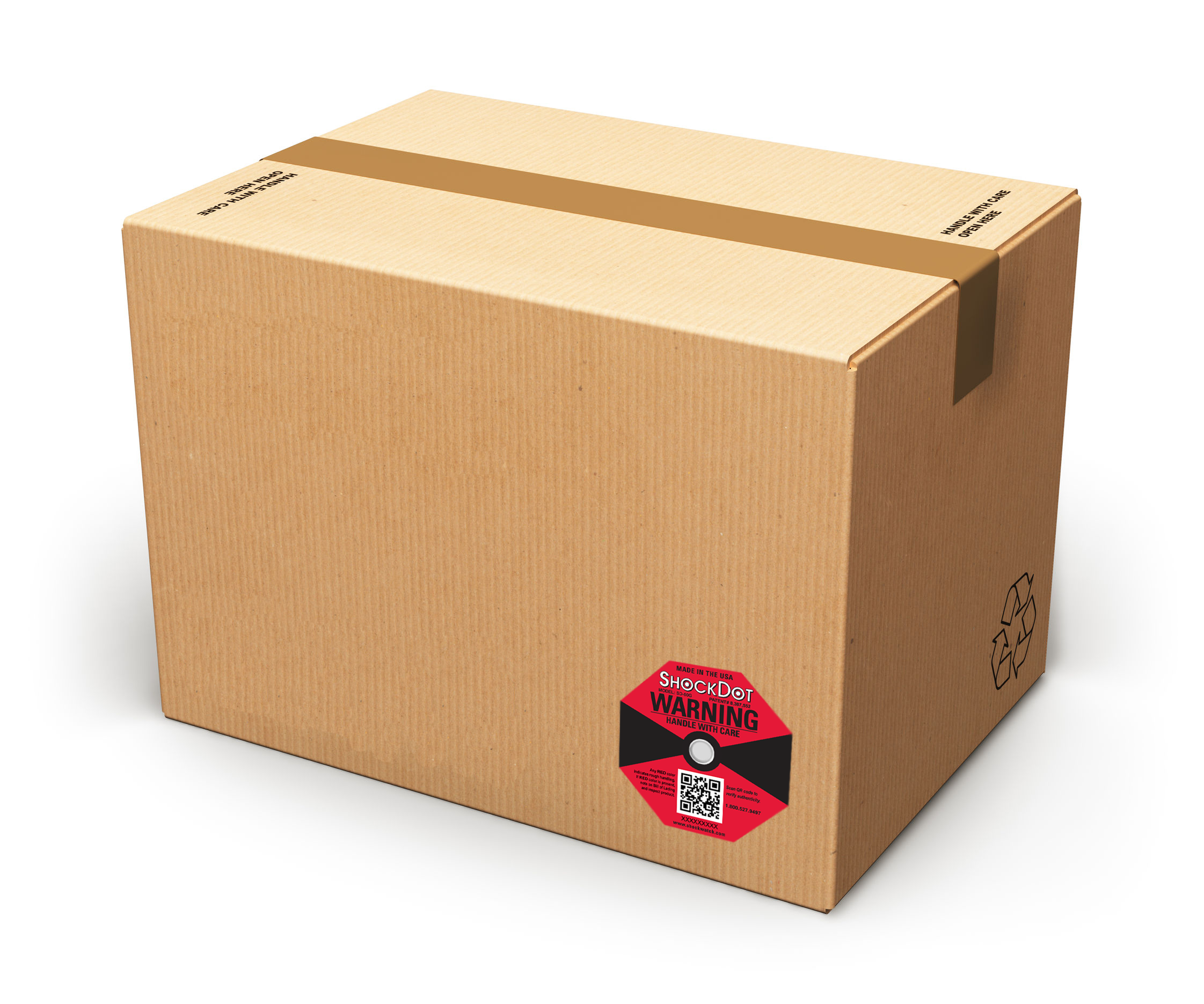
Shock detector on a package

Shock detectors can be mounted in sports helmets to help monitor impacts.

A shock detector, shock indicator, or impact monitor is a device which indicates whether a physical shock or impact has occurred. These usually have a binary output (go/no-go) and are sometimes called shock overload devices. Shock detectors can be used on shipments of fragile valuable items to indicate whether a potentially damaging drop or impact may have occurred. They are also used in sports helmets to help estimate if a dangerous impact may have occurred.

By contrast, a shock data logger is a data acquisition system for analysis and recording of shock pulses.

== Overview ==
Shocks and impacts are often specified by the peak acceleration expressed in g-s (sometimes called g-forces). The form of the shock pulse and particularly the duration are equally important. For example, a short 1 ms 300 g shock has little damage potential and is not usually of interest but a 20 ms 300 g shock might be critical. Depending on the use, the response to this time sensitivity of a shock detector needs to be matched to the sensitivity of the item it is intended to monitor.

The mounting location also affects the response of most shock detectors. A shock on a rigid item such as a sports helmet or a rigid package might respond to a field shock with a jagged shock pulse which, without proper filtering is difficult to characterize. A shock on a cushioned item usually has a smoother shock pulse., and thus more consistent responses from shock detector.

Shocks are vector quantities with the direction of the shock being important to the item of interest, Shock detectors also can be highly sensitive to the direction of the input shock.

A shock detector can be evaluated:

- Separately in a laboratory physical test, perhaps on an instrumented shock machine.
- Mounted to its intended item in a testing laboratory with controlled fixturing and controlled input shocks.
- In the field with uncontrolled and more highly variable input shocks.

Use of proper test methods and verification and validation protocols are important for all phases of evaluation.

== Technologies ==
A wide variety of technologies are available ranging from simple analog indicators to more sophisticated electronics. Usually a device provides an optical indication of a triggered event but sometimes electrical or RFID signals can be provided. Hundreds of shock detectors are described in patents listed in patent classification 01P15/00: "Measuring acceleration; Measuring deceleration; Measuring shock, i.e. sudden change of acceleration"

Analogue constructions - disruption of the surface tension of a liquid

Analogue constructions include:

- Spring-mass systems which can be triggered by a shock
- Magnetic balls which can be dislodged from a holder
- Disruption of the surface tension of a liquid
- Breakage of an inexpensive brittle component with a known fragility

More sophisticated electronic systems use accelerometers and associated microelectromechanical systems.

While both analogue and electronic shock detection technologies are widely used, they serve different operational purposes.

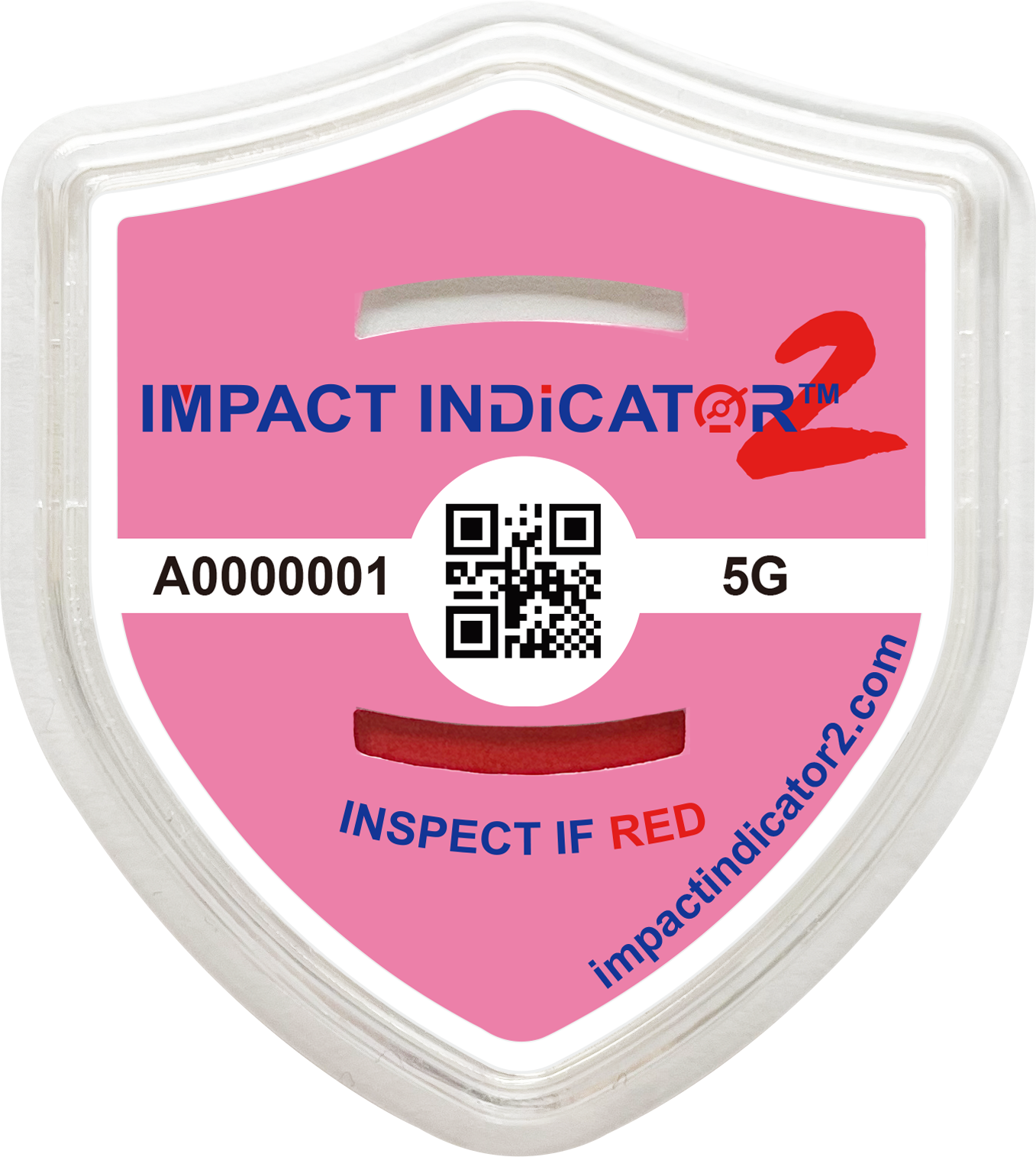
Single-Use Spring-Mass System Shock Detector

Analogue shock indicators are typically passive, single-use devices designed to provide a clear and immediate visual indication when a predefined shock threshold is exceeded. Their simple construction, low unit cost, and tamper-evident nature make them particularly suitable for large-scale logistics applications and mass shipments where continuous data logging is not required. In contrast, electronic shock detectors incorporate accelerometers and microelectromechanical systems to record detailed acceleration data over time. These systems are often reusable and capable of storing or transmitting data electronically, but they generally involve higher costs, power requirements, and more complex data interpretation.

Various constructions of shock indicators are used in commercial transportation and packaging where cost efficiency and ease of deployment are desired.

== Monitor shipments ==
Shock detector activation after excessive handling

A shock detector can be mounted on a package (inside or outside) or directly on the product being shipped. Mounting on the package is usually done to detect excessive handling such as high drop heights while mounting on the product is done to more closely indicate product damage.

Some shipments need more than one shock detector to better monitor all directions of impacts. Large or long items sometimes have shock detectors at both ends of the shipping container.

The shock detector indicates whether the goods in transit were likely to have been subjected to potentially damaging conditions. Based on this data, the options may be:

- If there have not been unusual shock, continue to use the shipment as is, without special inspection
- If potentially damaging hazards have occurred, thoroughly inspect the shipment for damage or conduct extra calibration prior to use
- The consignee may choose to negotiate with the carrier, shipper, or supplier or even to reject a shipment where sensors indicate severe handling

Shock and impact are not the only hazards that can cause damage; vibration, puncture, and compression can also cause damage yet would not trigger a shock detector.

== Impacts to people ==
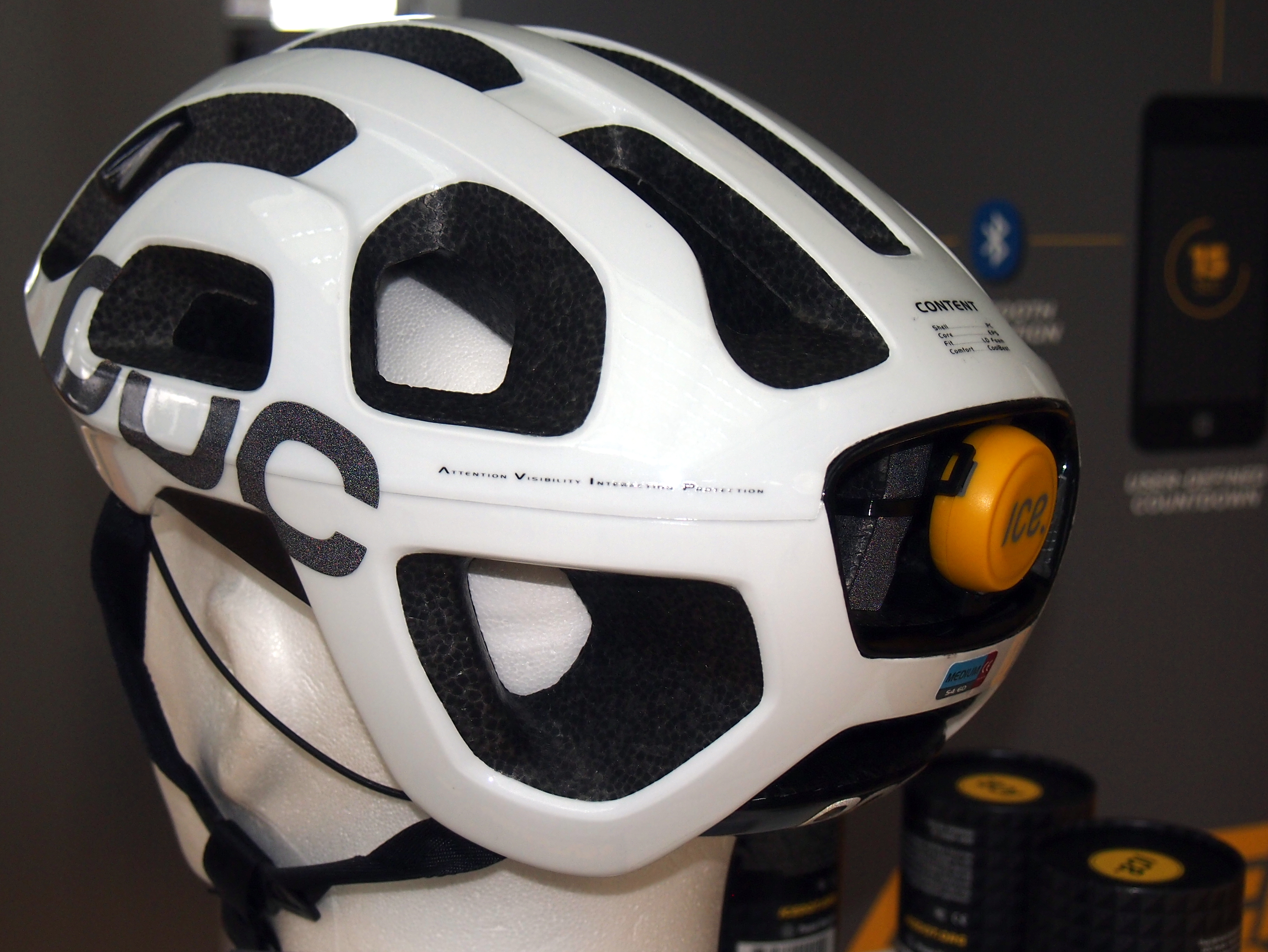
Shock detector in bicycle helmet signals when a crash has occurred

Personal protective equipment such as helmets are sometimes equipped with impact monitors. These are intended to help managers know if an excessive impact has occurred and help direct needed rest or medical attention. Research is continuing, including specialized mouthguards to help classify head impacts.

Crash sensors on bicycle helmets can detect a crash and call for assistance. Fall sensors are available to senior citizens to call for help when a fall is detected.

== Other uses ==
A related use of an impact detector is as automobile air bag sensor. These sophisticated sensors are used to trigger the protective air bag system used on current vehicles.

Active hard-drive protection systems sense impacts to laptop computers to help minimize damage from drops.

Some emergency locator beacons, such as Emergency Locator Transmitters, are activated by a specified shock or impact.

== Interpretation ==
Shock detectors are used to indicate if a significant impact has occurred: This helps determine the need for follow-up actions. Variability is always present and must be accounted for in the analysis:

- Shock detectors have some variation of response to shocks under controlled laboratory conditions.
- People respond as individuals to impacts. What might cause injury to one person might not be as severe to another.
- Fragile items and packaged goods respond with variation to uniform laboratory shocks,
- Field shocks are highly variable

Of course, it is best when the shock detector properly signals when damage or injury is likely and when it is not. It is very possible to have false positive signals where a shock detector is triggered but there is no damage to a product or no injury to a person. Likewise false negatives are also possible.

| | Damage or Injury | No Damage or Injury |
|---|---|---|
| Shock Detector Activated | Correct Signal | False Positive |
| Shock Detector Not Activated | False Negative | Correct Signal |

Shock detectors are intended to indicate a single severe shock or impact. In some instances a series of lesser shocks might cause damage or injury but would not trigger a shock detector.

== See also ==
- Concussion grading systems
- Concussions in sport
- Confusion matrix
- Evaluation of binary classifiers
- Football helmet
- Head injury criterion
- Head impact telemetry system
- Motion amplification, optical-visual technique for detecting and visualizing vibrations or other movement
- Package cushioning
- Sudden Motion Sensor
- Type I and type II errors

== Bibliography ==
- DeSilva, C. W., "Vibration and Shock Handbook", CRC, 2005, ISBN 0-8493-1580-8
- Harris, C. M., and Peirsol, A. G. "Shock and Vibration Handbook", 2001, McGraw Hill, ISBN 0-07-137081-1
- Yam, K.L., "Encyclopedia of Packaging Technology", John Wiley & Sons, 2009, ISBN 978-0-470-08704-6
