= Concussion grading systems =

Criteria used to determine the severity of a concussion

Concussion grading systems are sets of criteria used in sports medicine to determine the severity, or grade, of a concussion, the mildest form of traumatic brain injury. At least 16 such systems exist, and there is little agreement among professionals about which is the best to use. Several of the systems use loss of consciousness and amnesia as the primary determinants of the severity of the concussion.

== Uses ==
The systems are widely used to determine when it is safe to allow an athlete to return to competition. Concern exists that multiple concussions received in a short time may present an added danger, since an initial concussion may leave the brain in a vulnerable state for a time. Injured athletes are prohibited from returning to play before they are symptom-free during rest and exertion and their neuropsychological tests are normal again, in order to avoid a risk of cumulative effects such as decline in mental function and second-impact syndrome, which may occur on very rare occasions after a concussion that occurs before the symptoms from another concussion have resolved.

It is estimated that over 40% of high school athletes return to action prematurely and over 40,000 youth concussions occur annually. Concussions account for nearly 10% of sport injuries, and are the second leading cause of brain injury for young people ages 15–24.

== Particular systems ==
Three grading systems are followed most widely: the first by neurosurgeon Robert Cantu, another by the Colorado Medical Society, and a third by the American Academy of Neurology.

=== Cantu system ===
The Cantu system has become somewhat outdated.

- Grade I Grade one concussions come with no loss of consciousness and less than 30 minutes of post-traumatic amnesia.
- Grade II Grade two concussion patients lose consciousness for less than five minutes or have amnesia for between 30 minutes and 24 hours.
- Grade III People with grade three concussions have a loss of consciousness lasting longer than five minutes or amnesia lasts for 24 hours.

=== Glasgow Coma Scale ===
Originally developed by Teasdale and Jennett in 1974, the Glasgow Coma Scale (GCS) is a scoring scale for eye opening, motor, and verbal responses that can be administered to athletes on the field to objectively measure their level of consciousness. A score is assigned to each response type for a combined total score of 3 to 15 (with 15 being normal). An initial score of less than 5 is associated with an 80 percent chance of a lasting vegetative state or death. An initial score of greater than 11 is associated with a 90 percent chance of complete recovery. Because most concussed individuals score 14 or 15 on the 15-point scale, its primary use in evaluating individuals for sports-related concussions is to rule out more severe brain injury and to help determine which athletes need immediate medical attention.

=== Colorado Medical Society guidelines ===
The guidelines developed by the Colorado Medical Society were published in 1991 in response to the death of a high school athlete due to what was thought to be second-impact syndrome. According to the guidelines, a grade I concussion consists of confusion only, grade II includes confusion and post-traumatic amnesia, and grade III and IV involve a loss of consciousness.

By these guidelines, an athlete who has suffered a concussion may return to sports after having been free of symptoms, both at rest and during exercise, as shown in the following table:

Colorado Medical Society guidelines for return to play
Grade	First concussion	Subsequent concussions
I	15 minutes	1 week
II	1 week	2 weeks, with physician approval
IIIa (unconscious for seconds)	1 month	6 months, with physician approval
IIIb (unconscious for minutes)	6 months	1 year, with physician approval

=== American Academy of Neurology guidelines ===
The guidelines devised in 1997 by the American Academy of Neurology (AAN) were based on those formulated by the Colorado Medical Society. However, in 2013 the AAN published a revised set of guidelines that moved away from concussion grading, emphasizing more detailed neurological assessment prior to return to play. The guidelines emphasized that younger patients should be managed more conservatively and that risk of recurrent concussion was highest within 10 days following the initial injury. Risk of concussion was also stratified by sport, training time, and player Body Mass Index.

The guideline also called into question the existence of the "second impact syndrome", proposing instead that athletes with a previous concussion may be more vulnerable to severe injury due to decreased reaction time and coordination, symptoms of the initial injury.

== See also ==
- Sports injury
- Head injury criterion
- Concussions in sport
- Chronic traumatic encephalopathy
- Frontotemporal dementia
