= Shock and vibration data logger =

Measurement instrument

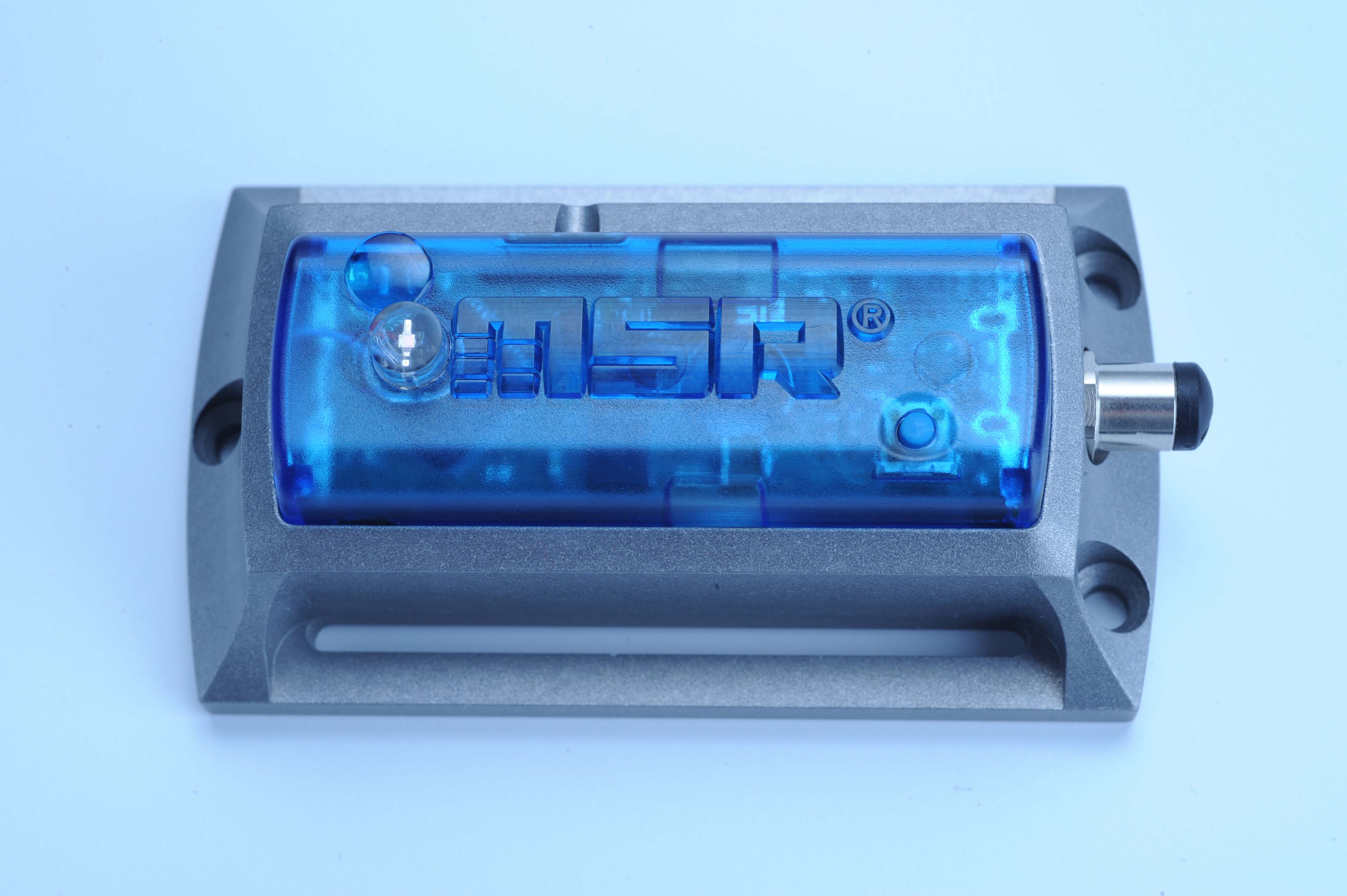
Shock and vibration logger with integrated 3-axis digital accelerometer and lithium-polymer battery

A shock data logger or vibration data logger is a measurement instrument that is capable of autonomously recording shocks or vibrations over a defined period of time. Digital data is usually in the form of acceleration and time. The shock and vibration data can be retrieved (or transmitted), viewed and evaluated after it has been recorded.

In contrast with a shock data logger, a shock detector is used to indicate whether or not the threshold of specified shock has occurred.

== Functions ==
A logger comprises sensors such as accelerometers, storage media, a processor and power supply. The sensors measure and store shocks either as the entire waveform, summary data, or an indication of whether a threshold value was observed . Some devices have accelerometers built into the unit while others can use external accelerometers. The processor processes the measured data and saves it on the storage media together with the associated measurement times. This allows the measurement data to be retrieved after the measurements have been completed, either directly on the logger or via an interface to a computer. Some have an RFID interface. Software is used to present the measured data in the form of tables or graphs and provides functions for the evaluation of the measurement data. The shock and vibration data is either recorded continuously over a defined time period or on an event-driven basis where the recording of data is determined by certain criteria. Employing such an event-based measurement method allows the recording of specific shocks that exceed a critical length of time or strength. Some have wireless capability such as Bluetooth transmissions to smartphones.

Acceleration loggers usually use non-volatile storage media for recording the measurement data. These may be hard disc drives or EEPROMs for instance. Such devices will not lose the data when the device is powered down. This also means that the measured data will remain stored in the event of a power failure.

== Overview of shock measurement ==
Shocks and impacts are often described by the peak acceleration expressed in g-s (sometimes called g-forces). The form of the shock pulse and particularly the pulse duration are equally important. For example, a short 1 ms 300 g shock has little damage potential and is not usually of interest but a 20 ms 300 g shock might be critical. Use of shock response spectrum analysis is also useful.

The mounting location also affects the response of most shock detectors. A shock on a rigid item such as a sports helmet or a rigid package might respond to a field shock with a jagged shock pulse which, without proper filtering is difficult to characterize. A shock on a cushioned item usually has a smoother shock pulse., and thus more consistent responses from shock detector.

Shocks are vector quantities with the direction of the shock often being important to the item of interest.

A shock data logger can be evaluated: separately in a laboratory physical test, perhaps on an instrumented shock machine; or mounted to its intended item in a testing laboratory with controlled fixturing and controlled input shocks; or in the field with uncontrolled and more highly variable input shocks.

Use of proper test methods, calibration, and Verification and validation protocols are important for all phases of evaluation.

== Monitoring of goods in transit ==
Shock loggers can be used to monitor fragile and valuable goods during transit and to measure the transportation shock and vibration environment. The loggers can be rigidly attached to the goods, packaging, or transport vehicles so that they can record the shocks and vibrations acting upon them. Some large items may have several shock sensors to measure different locations. The measured data reveals whether the goods in transit have been subjected to potentially damaging conditions. Based on this data, the options may be:

- If there have not been unusual shock or vibration continue to use the shipment as is, without special inspection
- If potentially damaging hazards have occurred, thoroughly inspect the shipment for damage or conduct extra calibration prior to use
- The consignee may choose to reject a shipment where sensors indicate severe handling
- The time of the damage, or GPS tracking, may be able to determine the location of the damaging shock or vibration to direct appropriate corrective action.

Shock and vibration data from multiple replicate shipments can be used to: compare the shipment severity of different routings or of logistics providers; or develop composite data to be used in package testing protocols. The shock handling data is often most useful converted from accelerations to drop heights or other means of quantifying the severity of impacts. Several means of statistical analysis of drops and impacts are available. Vibration data is often most useful in power spectral density format which can be used in to control random vibration testing in a laboratory.

== Other applications ==
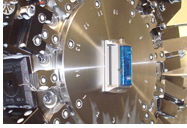
Acceleration logger measuring vibrations on a tool carousel of a CNC lathe

Among other applications, acceleration sensors are used to:

- Measure accelerations in motor vehicles, for example during the reconstruction of road accidents.
- Monitor machinery used on production lines that is sensitive to shocks or vibrations.
- Monitor and reduce wear in industrial plants and for increasing the performance of machines.
- Monitor and record earthquakes.
- Monitor trucks for excessive jolts
- Measure vibrations in wind turbines
- Record input shocks and vibrations to humans
- Record movement data for health management, patient monitoring.
- Animal monitoring of breathing, walking, standing, lying and sleeping behaviour.
- Measuring acceleration for avalanche emergency systems.
- Measure impacts to sports helmets and biomechanics testing
- Determine the g-forces acting on people when riding rollercoasters.
- Establish accelerations for objects on conveyor belts.

== See also ==
- Accelerometer
- Data logger
- Motion amplification, optical-visual technique for detecting and visualizing vibrations
- Shock detector
- Temperature data logger
