= Second-impact syndrome =

- Specialty: Neurology

Second-impact syndrome (SIS) occurs when the brain swells rapidly, and catastrophically, after a person has a second concussion before symptoms from an earlier one have subsided. This second blow may occur minutes, days, or weeks after an initial concussion, and even the mildest grade of concussion can lead to second impact syndrome. The condition is often fatal, and almost everyone who is not killed is severely disabled. The cause of SIS is uncertain, but it is thought that the brain's arterioles lose their ability to regulate their diameter, and therefore lose control over cerebral blood flow, causing massive cerebral edema.

In order to prevent SIS, guidelines have been established to prohibit athletes from returning to a game prematurely. For example, professionals recommend that athletes not return to play before symptoms of an initial head injury have resolved.

== Signs and symptoms ==
SIS is a potential complication from an athlete returning to a game before symptoms from a minor head injury have subsided. Such symptoms include headache, cognitive difficulties, or visual changes.

The initial injury may be a concussion, or it may be another, more severe, type of head trauma, such as cerebral contusion. However, the first concussion need not be severe for the second impact to cause SIS. Also, the second impact may be very minor, even a blow such as an impact to the chest that causes the head to jerk, thereby transmitting forces of acceleration to the brain. Loss of consciousness during the second injury is not necessary for SIS to occur. Both injuries may take place in the same game.

The athlete may continue playing in the game after the second concussion, and may walk off the field without assistance, but symptoms quickly progress and the condition can rapidly worsen. Neurological collapse can occur within a short period, with rapid onset of dilating pupils, loss of eye movement, unconsciousness, and respiratory failure. Failure of the brain stem frequently occurs between two and five minutes after the second impact, and death can follow shortly.

SIS is sometimes associated with a small subdural hematoma.

== Risk factors ==
Second-impact syndrome shares all the risk factors of a concussion; that is, those who are at increased risk for a concussion are also at higher risk for SIS. Thus, people who participate in sports such as boxing, Association football, American football, baseball, rugby, basketball, ice hockey, pro wrestling, horse riding, sailing, and skiing (especially Alpine) are at increased risk. The condition most commonly occurs in American football.

Second-impact syndrome disproportionately affects teenagers. All documented cases occurred in people younger than 20 except in boxing. As of 2000, the syndrome had never been reported in the medical literature in children younger than adolescent age. Young athletes have been found to be both more susceptible to concussions and more likely to get second-impact syndrome than their older counterparts. However, SIS is also a concern for adult athletes. Adolescent and young adult males who play American football or hockey, or who box or ski are the most common individuals with the condition. Most documented cases of SIS have occurred in males, but it is not known whether this is due to a special vulnerability or to a greater exposure of males to second impacts.

In Canada, a law mandating concussion education for coaches, athletes, and medical practitioners was passed as a result of the death of Rowan Stringer, a female high school athlete who died after receiving three blows to the head in the course of one week in 2013. She showed only mild symptoms of headache following the first two impacts, but lost consciousness and never regained it following the third. Medical examiners found that SIS was the cause of her death.

Studies have found that people who have received one concussion are at a higher risk to receive a concussion in the future.

== Pathophysiology ==
Types of brain herniation 1) Uncal 2) Central - The brainstem herniates caudally. 3) Cingulate herniation - The brain squeezes under the falx cerebri. 4) Transcalvarial herniation - through a skull fracture 5) Upward herniation of the cerebellum 6) Tonsillar herniation - the cerebellar tonsils herniate through the foramen magnum.

A concussion temporarily changes the brain's function. It is believed that the brain is left in a vulnerable state after a concussion and that a second blow is linked to SIS. The actual mechanism behind the catastrophic brain swelling is controversial. A second injury during this time is thought to unleash a series of metabolic events within the brain. Changes indicative of SIS may begin occurring in the injured brain within 15 seconds of the second concussion. Pathophysiological changes in SIS can include a loss of autoregulation of the brain's blood vessels, which causes them to become congested. The vessels dilate, greatly increasing their diameter and leading to a large increase in cerebral blood flow. Progressive cerebral edema may also occur. The increase of blood and brain volume within the skull causes a rapid and severe increase in intracranial pressure, which can in turn cause uncal and cerebellar brain herniation, a disastrous and potentially fatal condition in which the brain is squeezed past structures within the skull.

Studies on animals have shown that the brain may be more vulnerable to a second concussive injury administered shortly after a first. In one such study, a mild impact administered within 24 hours of another one with minimal neurological impairment caused massive breakdown of the blood brain barrier and subsequent brain swelling. Loss of this protective barrier could be responsible for the edema found in SIS.

Animal studies have shown that the immature brain may be more vulnerable to brain trauma; these findings may provide clues as to why SIS primarily affects people under age 18.

== Diagnosis ==
Magnetic resonance imaging and computed tomography are the most useful imaging tools for detecting SIS. The congestion in the brain's blood vessels may be visible using CT scans.

SIS is distinct from repetitive head injury syndrome, in which a person has a series of minor head injuries over time and experiences a slow decline in functions such as cognitive abilities. Unlike SIS, repetitive head injury syndrome may still occur even when symptoms from prior injuries have completely resolved. SIS is thought to be more severe than repetitive head injury syndrome in both the short- and long-term.

== Prevention ==
Measures that prevent head injuries in general also prevent SIS. Thus athletes are advised to use protective gear such as helmets, though helmets do not entirely prevent the syndrome.

Experts advise that athletes who have had one concussion and still complain of concussion-related symptoms be prohibited from returning to the game due to the possibility of developing SIS. Athletes are also discouraged from returning to play until after they have been evaluated and approved for resuming the sport by a healthcare provider skilled in evaluating concussion. Some athletes may deny concussion symptoms because they do not wish to be prevented from rejoining the game. An initial head injury may impair an athlete's judgment and ability to decide to refrain from participating in risky activity, so some healthcare providers encourage family members and other acquaintances to pressure an athlete not to return to play.

Several different sets of return-to-play guidelines exist for athletes who have had minor head trauma. These exist in part to prevent the player from developing SIS. A variety of concussion grading systems have been devised, in part to aid in this determination. Every return-to-play guideline recommends that an athlete not return to competition until all concussion symptoms are absent during both rest and exercise. The American Academy of Neurology recommends that young athletes be prohibited from returning to play for at least a week in most cases of concussion.

Some think that the current return-to-play guidelines may not be strict enough to protect young athletes from SIS. Others say they may be too strict for professional football players, as evidence that the syndrome exists in this population is lacking.

== Treatment ==
Treatment of the loss of auto regulation of the brain's blood vessels may be difficult or impossible. When SIS occurs, surgery does not help and there is little hope for recovery. Treatment requires immediate recognition and includes administration of osmotic agents and hyperventilation in order to lower intracranial pressure.

== Prognosis ==
The mortality rate for SIS approaches 50%, and morbidity (disability) is almost 100%. Since the condition is so rare, the connection between SIS and future disability has been difficult to establish and is therefore poorly understood.

When SIS is not fatal, the effects are similar to those of severe traumatic brain injury can occur, including persistent muscle spasms and tenseness, emotional instability, hallucinations, post-traumatic epilepsy, mental disability, paralysis, coma, and brain death.

== Epidemiology ==
Though the incidence of second-impact syndrome is unknown, the condition is rare; very few cases have been confirmed in medical literature. The controversy surrounding the existence of second impact syndrome may play a role in the known and recorded incidence. The United States seemingly has far more reported cases of second-impact syndrome than elsewhere. The patients affected most often include young adults and adolescents that are 16 to 19 years old. Adolescents who sustain a head injury that goes unrecognized could be placing themselves at a greater risk due to the effects of longer and more diffuse cerebral swelling that occurs in their body. The adolescent brain is 60 times more sensitive to components of the metabolic chain reaction that occurs after trauma, resulting in more diffuse cerebral swelling. After the initial concussion, the children and young adults are more likely to sustain a second impact within the first two weeks.

In athletics, the susceptible population includes those that participate in contact sports such as American football, boxing and hockey. In the 13-year period from 1980 to 1993, 35 American football related cases of SIS were recorded; 17 of these were confirmed by autopsy or surgery and magnetic resonance imaging to be due to SIS, and 18 cases were found to be probably SIS-related. Additionally, the initial trauma commonly goes unreported, adding to the confusion about how often the syndrome occurs. The prevalence of unreported trauma is common as a study showed that 25% of athletes thought that a concussion requires loss of consciousness. A study by Sullivan et al. found that 83% of male rugby athletes were aware of concussion signs and symptoms, but only 50% understood or were aware of the protocol to return to play after an injury. When coaches were surveyed, 45% of participants did not believe immediate removal from play is warranted after a concussion. Of this group surveyed, 62% identified proper post concussion management and this lack of proper post concussion management could lead to SIS.

Both direct blows to the head and blows to the body can produce subdural hematomas, diffuse cerebral edema, subarachnoid hemorrhage, and ischemic stroke, all pathologies that can lead to death. By one estimate, the syndrome kills four to six people under the age of 18 per year. According to the Centers for Disease Control, about 1.5 people die each year from a concussion in the US; in most of these cases, the person had received another concussion previously. In the presence of second-impact syndrome, the mortality rate is at best 50% when diffuse cerebral swelling occurs.

In part due to the poor documentation of the initial injury and continuing symptoms in recorded cases, some professionals think that the condition is over-diagnosed, and some doubt the validity of the diagnosis altogether. Due to the nature of the impact, the validity may be in question as subdural hematomas or other structural anomalies may directly affect the outcome. Along with the short term effects that occur with second-impact syndrome, improper care for concussions can lead to longer term effects as well. These include early onset dementia or Alzheimer's, and early onset of Parkinson's disease. Increased loss of vision and risk of stroke can occur further on in their lives.

== History ==
The condition was first described in 1973 by R.C. Schneider, and the term second-impact syndrome was coined in 1984. In 1984, R.L. Saunders described the death of a football player who had died after a second, unremarkable concussion and hypothesized that the second blow caused a catastrophic rise in ICP, possibly through loss of vasomotor tone, because the brain was in a vulnerable state. Between 1984 and 1991, only four cases were documented. Between 1992 and 1998, reports of the condition began to be made more frequently than they had before, a fact is thought to be due to wider recognition of the syndrome by clinicians. In 1991, J.P. Kelly and others reported another football death after repeated concussions and coined the term "vascular congestion syndrome".

In 2005, Preston Plevretes, a football player for LaSalle University, had his life changed forever by second-impact syndrome. After undergoing a head-to-head hit at football practice, a university nurse practitioner diagnosed Plevretes with a concussion and two days later was told he was allowed to resume play. Three games after returning Plevretes sustained another concussion resulting in second-impact syndrome. He was rushed to the hospital where doctors cut the right side of his skull. Five years after the injury, he still struggled to do everyday activities. Because of Plevretes, the NCAA revised concussion guidelines. The NCAA strongly urges schools to have a concussion management plan. They also require that an athlete have clearance by a team doctor before being allowed to return.

In 2006, Zachary Lystedt, a thirteen-year-old football player, sustained a concussion during one of his games. He shrugged off the hit and went back in the game a few plays later. At the end of the game, he collapsed on the field. Lystedt had second-impact syndrome. He was airlifted to a hospital where surgeons cut both sides of his skull so that the blood clot could be taken out. He was in the hospital for months and reportedly still has trouble with physical tasks such as walking. To prevent other families from going through what they went through, the Lystedt family made it their goal to make a law that athletes who are suspected of a concussion are not allowed to return to play unless he or she is cleared by a licensed physician. The law is now effective in over thirty states.

In 2018, eighteen-year-old boxer Jeanette Zacarias Zapata went into convulsions after receiving multiple blows in a match with Marie Pier Houl. Zapata was in a coma for five days before her death attributed to SIS. Further investigation revealed that falsified documents cleared her to fight after suffering a previous knockout defeat three months prior.

By 2003, 21 cases of SIS had been reported in medical literature.

== Controversy ==
The existence of SIS is in question and is somewhat controversial. The sudden collapse seen in patients may be due to a type of cerebral edema that can follow an initial impact in children and teenagers, rather than to SIS. This type of edema, referred to as diffuse cerebral swelling, may be the real reason for the collapse which young people sometimes experience and which is commonly thought to be due to SIS. Those who doubt the validity of the diagnosis cite the finding that diffuse cerebral swelling is more common in children and adolescents as an explanation for the greater frequency of SIS diagnoses in young people. One group found that of 17 previously identified cases of SIS, only 5 met their diagnostic criteria for the syndrome, with some cases not clearly involving a second impact. They found that diagnoses of SIS were frequently based on bystander accounts of previous injuries, which they showed to be unreliable. Teammates of players who are thought to have SIS may over-report the initial concussion, giving the appearance of a greater number of second impacts than actually exist. Thus critics argue that the small number of reported cases leaves the question of whether SIS really causes the brain to swell catastrophically unanswered.

Whether a second impact is really involved in the diffuse cerebral swelling that occurs on rare occasions after a mild traumatic brain injury is controversial, but some experts agree that such catastrophic brain swelling does occur after a very small number of mild brain injuries and that young age is associated with increased risk. It is also agreed that some people may be particularly vulnerable to catastrophic brain swelling as the result of multiple head injuries.

== See also ==
- Brain damage
- Dementia pugilistica (punch-drunk syndrome)
- Post-concussion syndrome
- Coup and contrecoup injury
