= 1993 Pittsburgh Steelers season =

Pittsburgh Steelers 61st US football season

- Owner: The Rooney Family
- General manager: Tom Donahoe
- Head coach: Bill Cowher
- Offensive coordinator: Ron Erhardt
- Defensive coordinator: Dom Capers
- Home stadium: Three Rivers Stadium

Results
- Record: 9–7
- Division place: 2nd AFC Central
- Playoffs: Lost Wild Card Playoffs (at Chiefs) 24–27 (OT)
- All-Pros: 3: Dermontti Dawson (1st team); Greg Lloyd (1st team); Rod Woodson (1st team)
- Pro Bowlers: 6: PK Gary Anderson; C Dermontti Dawson; RB Barry Foster; TE Eric Green; OLB Greg Lloyd; CB Rod Woodson
- Team MVP: Rod Woodson
- Team ROY: Chad Brown

The 1993 Pittsburgh Steelers season was the franchise's 61st season as a professional sports franchise and as a member of the National Football League.

The Steelers looked to continue the progress made under second year head coach Bill Cowher. However, the team would take a slight step backwards, finishing 9–7 (three games behind the eventual AFC Central champion Houston Oilers). Despite that, the Steelers clinched a wild card spot, making the playoffs for the second consecutive year. The team would lose to the Kansas City Chiefs 27–24 in overtime in the AFC Wild Card Round of the playoffs, in what is considered one of the best playoff games in NFL history even though the Steelers were on the losing end.

In the second week of the season, the Steelers suffered a shutout loss to the Los Angeles Rams 27–0, in the team's penultimate visit to the Los Angeles area until 2019. The day was highlighted by the emergence of Rams rookie Jerome Bettis running over the Steelers defense. Though no one knew it at the time, it would foreshadow what was to come with Bettis' career—as a member of the Steelers, who would acquire Bettis in a draft day trade with the Rams three years later.

1993 was also the season in which the Steelers began their policy of "blacking out" regular season contract negotiations. Early in the season the Steelers had reached contract extensions with Rod Woodson and Barry Foster and continued negotiations with other players. However, this led to discord in the locker room, and management felt that contract talk was taking the team's focus off of winning. At mid-season the Steelers broke off all contract negotiations and have refused to negotiate contracts during the regular season since.

== Offseason ==
Additions	Subtractions
QB Mike Tomczak (Browns)	QB Bubby Brister (Eagles)
LB Kevin Greene (Rams)	LB Jerrol Williams (Chargers)
OL David Viaene (Packers)	LB Hardy Nickerson (Buccaneers)
LB Louis Cooper (Chiefs)	T Tunch Ilkin (Packers)
LB Greg Clark (Seahawks)	DE Aaron Jones (Patriots)
WR Louis Lipps (Saints)	RB Warren Williams (Colts)

=== NFL draft ===
1993 Pittsburgh Steelers draft
Round	Pick	Player	Position	College	Notes
1	23	Deon Figures	Cornerback	Colorado	
2	44	Chad Brown *	Linebacker	Colorado	
3	76	Andre Hastings	Wide receiver	Georgia	
4	108	Kevin Henry	Defensive end	Mississippi State	
5	135	Lonnie Palelei	Guard	UNLV	
5	140	Marc Woodard	Linebacker	Mississippi State	from Dallas
6	162	Willie Williams	Cornerback	Western Carolina	
7	185	Jeff Zgonina	Defensive tackle	Purdue	from Washington
7	189	Craig Keith	Tight end	Lenoir–Rhyne	
8	216	Alex Van Pelt	Quarterback	Pittsburgh	
Made roster

=== Undrafted free agents ===
1993 undrafted free agents of note
Player	Position	College
Reggie Barnes	Linebacker	Oklahoma
Randy Cuthbert	Running back	Duke
Boris Graham	Linebacker	West Virginia
Martin Houston	Fullback	Alabama
Toby Lawrence	Guard	Kansas State
Gary Reid	Defensive linemen	Cincinnati
Tim Samec	Center	Virginia
Ricky Sutton	Defensive linemen	Auburn

== Personnel ==
=== Coaches / Staff ===
1993 Pittsburgh Steelers staff
Front office: President – Daniel M. Rooney; Vice president – John R. McGinley; Vice president – Arthur J. Rooney, Jr.; Secretary & counsel – Arthur J. Rooney II; Administration advisor – Chuck Noll; Director of communications – Joe Gordon; Public relations coordinator – Dan Edwards; PR Assistant/Community Relations – Ron Miller; Controller – Michael J. Hagan; Assistant controller – Dan Ferens; Assistant controller – Jim Ellenberger; Ticket sales manager – Geraldine Glenn; Football operations; Director of football operations – Tom Donahoe; Football business manager – James A. Boston; Player development coordinator – Anthony Griggs; Scouting staff; Director of scouting – Tom Modrak; Pro personnel coordinator – Charles Bailey; Administrative – Ralph Berlin; College scout – Phil Kreidler; BLESTO College Scout – Bob Lane; College scout – Max McCartney; College scout – Bob Schmitz; Head coaches: Head coach – Bill Cowher; Offensive coaches: Offensive coordinator – Ron Erhardt; Offensive backfield – Dick Hoak; Wide receivers – Bob Harrison; Tight ends – Pat Hodgson; Offensive line – Kent Stephenson	Defensive coaches: Defensive coordinator – Dom Capers; Defensive line – Steve Furness; Linebackers – Marvin Lewis; Defensive backs – Dick LeBeau; Special teams coaches: Special teams – John Guy; Strength and conditioning: Conditioning coordinator – Chet Fuhrman; Medical staff; Ophthalmologist – Dr. Randy Beatty; Physician, orthopedic – Dr. James P. Bradley; Neurological surgery consultant – Dr. Joseph Maroon; Physician, M.D. – Dr. Richard Rydze; Physician, consultant – Dr. Abraham J. Twerski; Physician, M.D. – Dr. Anthony P. Yates; Training staff; Head trainer – John Norwig; Assistant trainer – Rick Burkholder; Equipment manager – Anthony Parisi; Field manager – Rodgers Freyvogel; Video coordinator – Bob McCartney; Video assistant – Pat Dolan; Photographers – Mike Fabus, Bill Amatucci

Notable additions include Chad Brown, Kevin Greene and Willie Williams

=== Final roster ===
1993 Pittsburgh Steelers roster
Quarterbacks (QB): 14 Neil O'Donnell; 11 Rick Strom; 18 Mike Tomczak; Running backs (RB): 42 Randy Cuthbert; 33 Merril Hoge FB; 30 Victor Jones; 34 Leroy Thompson; Wide receivers (WR): 80 Charles Davenport; 81 Jeff Graham; 88 Andre Hastings KR; 89 Ernie Mills; 20 Dwight Stone KR; 82 Yancey Thigpen; Tight ends (TE): 87 Adrian Cooper; 86 Eric Green; 84 Tim Jorden; 85 Craig Keith	Offensive linemen (OL): 63 Dermontti Dawson C; 77 Carlton Haselrig G; 65 John Jackson T; 67 Duval Love G; 68 Lonnie Palelei G; 72 Leon Searcy T; 69 Ariel Solomon C; 73 Justin Strzelczyk G; Defensive linemen (DL): 64 Kenny Davidson DE; 66 Donald Evans DE; 79 Mike Finn DE; 76 Kevin Henry DE; 93 Joel Steed NT; 96 Ricky Sutton DE; 98 Gerald Williams DE; 97 Jeff Zgonina NT	Linebackers (LB): 50 Reggie Barnes ILB; 94 Chad Brown ILB; 91 Kevin Greene OLB; 53 Bryan Hinkle OLB; 54 Dave Hoffmann ILB; 99 Levon Kirkland ILB; 95 Greg Lloyd OLB; 56 Rico Mack OLB; Defensive backs (DB): 21 Deon Figures CB; 22 Larry Griffin SS; 28 Alan Haller CB; 44 D. J. Johnson CB; 25 Gary Jones FS; 37 Carnell Lake SS; 39 Darren Perry FS; 27 Willie Williams CB; 26 Rod Woodson CB; Special teams (ST): 1 Gary Anderson K; 60 Kendall Gammon LS; 3 Mark Royals P	Practice squad: 23 Chuckie Dukes RB; 36 Fred Foggie S; 83 Leslie Shepherd WR; 61 Tim Simpson G/C; Reserve: 29 Barry Foster RB (IR); 55 Jerry Olsavsky LB (IR); 24 Richard Shelton S (IR); Rookies in italics 53 active, 3 reserve, 4 practice squad

== Preseason ==
=== Schedule ===
Week	Date	Opponent	Result	Record	Venue
1	August 1	vs. San Francisco 49ers	L 21–14	0–1	Estadi Olímpic (Barcelona, Spain)
2	August 7	New York Jets	W 17–13	1–1	Three Rivers Stadium
3	August 14	at New York Giants	W 23–17	2–1	Giants Stadium
4	August 22	Washington Redskins	L 3–10	2–2	Three Rivers Stadium
5	August 26	at Minnesota Vikings	L 13–30	2–3	Hubert H. Humphrey Metrodome

== Regular season ==
=== Schedule ===
Week	Date	Opponent	Result	Record	Venue
1	September 5	San Francisco 49ers	**L** 13–24	0–1	Three Rivers Stadium
2	September 12	at Los Angeles Rams	**L** 0–27	0–2	Anaheim Stadium
3	September 19	**Cincinnati Bengals**	**W** 34–7	1–2	Three Rivers Stadium
4	September 27	at Atlanta Falcons	**W** 45–17	2–2	Georgia Dome
5	Bye				
6	October 10	San Diego Chargers	**W** 16–3	3–2	Three Rivers Stadium
7	October 17	New Orleans Saints	**W** 37–14	4–2	Three Rivers Stadium
8	October 24	at **Cleveland Browns**	**L** 23–28	4–3	Cleveland Municipal Stadium
9	Bye				
10	November 7	at **Cincinnati Bengals**	**W** 24–16	5–3	Riverfront Stadium
11	November 15	Buffalo Bills	**W** 23–0	6–3	Three Rivers Stadium
12	November 21	at Denver Broncos	**L** 37–13	6–4	Mile High Stadium
13	November 28	at **Houston Oilers**	**L** 3–23	6–5	Astrodome
14	December 5	New England Patriots	**W** 17–14	7–5	Three Rivers Stadium
15	December 13	at Miami Dolphins	**W** 21–20	8–5	Joe Robbie Stadium
16	December 19	**Houston Oilers**	**L** 17–26	8–6	Three Rivers Stadium
17	December 26	at Seattle Seahawks	**L** 6–16	8–7	Kingdome
18	January 2	**Cleveland Browns**	**W** 16–9	9–7	Three Rivers Stadium
Note: Intra-division opponents are in **bold** text.

=== Standings ===
AFC Central
	W	L	T	PCT	PF	PA	STK
^{(2)} Houston Oilers	12	4	0	.750	368	238	W11
^{(6)} Pittsburgh Steelers	9	7	0	.563	308	281	W1
Cleveland Browns	7	9	0	.438	304	307	L1
Cincinnati Bengals	3	13	0	.188	187	319	L1

=== Game summaries ===
==== Week 1 (Sunday September 5, 1993): vs. San Francisco 49ers ====
	1	2	3	4	Total
**49ers**	10	7	0	7	**24**
Steelers	0	3	10	0	**13**

at Three Rivers Stadium, Pittsburgh, Pennsylvania

- Game time: 1:00 pm EDT
- Game weather: 74 °F (23 °C) (Mostly Sunny)
- Game attendance: 57,502
- Referee: Gordon McCarter
- TV announcers: (CBS) Dick Stockton (play by play), Dan Fouts (color commentator)

Scoring drives:

- San Francisco – FG Cofer 37
- San Francisco – Rice 5 pass from Young (Cofer kick)
- San Francisco – Rice 6 pass from Young (Cofer kick)
- Pittsburgh – FG Anderson 29
- Pittsburgh – Foster 5 run (Anderson kick)
- Pittsburgh – FG Anderson 39
- San Francisco – B. Jones 5 pass from Young (Cofer kick)

==== Week 2 (Sunday September 12, 1993): at Los Angeles Rams ====
	1	2	3	4	Total
Steelers	0	0	0	0	**0**
**Rams**	0	14	3	10	**27**

at Anaheim Stadium, Anaheim, California

- Game time: 4:00 pm EDT
- Game weather: 72 °F (22 °C) (Cloudy)
- Game attendance: 50,588
- Referee: Dick Hantak
- TV announcers: (NBC) Dan Hicks (play by play), Joe Gibbs (color commentator)

Scoring drives:

- Los Angeles Rams – Drayton 22 pass from Everett (Zendejas kick)
- Los Angeles Rams – Gary 6 run (Zendejas kick)
- Los Angeles Rams – FG Zendejas 54
- Los Angeles Rams – FG Zendejas 50
- Los Angeles Rams – Bettis 29 run (Zendejas kick)

==== Week 3 (Sunday September 19, 1993): vs. Cincinnati Bengals ====
	1	2	3	4	Total
Bengals	0	7	0	0	**7**
**Steelers**	7	10	10	7	**34**

at Three Rivers Stadium, Pittsburgh, Pennsylvania

- Game time: 1:00 pm EDT
- Game weather: 66 °F (19 °C) (Mostly Sunny)
- Game attendance: 53,682
- Referee: Gerald Austin
- TV announcers: (NBC) Tom Hammond (play by play), Cris Collinsworth (color commentator)

Scoring drives:

- PIttsburgh – Mills 3 pass from O'Donnell (Anderson kick)
- Pittsburgh – FG Anderson 33
- Cincinnati – Pickens 15 pass from Klingler (Pelfrey kick)
- Pittsburgh – Thigpen 18 pass from O'Donnell (Anderson kick)
- Pittsburgh – FG Anderson 34
- Pittsburgh – Stone 9 pass from O'Donnell (Anderson kick)
- PIttsburgh – Stone 38 run (Anderson kick)

==== Week 4 (Monday September 27, 1993): at Atlanta Falcons ====
	1	2	3	4	Total
**Steelers**	7	17	7	14	**45**
Falcons	14	3	0	0	**17**

at Georgia Dome, Atlanta

- Game time: 9:00 pm EDT
- Game weather: Dome
- Game attendance: 65,477
- Referee: Bob McElwee
- TV announcers: (ABC) Al Michaels (play by play), Frank Gifford & Dan Dierdorf (color commentators)

Scoring drives:

- Pittsburgh – Foster 30 run (Anderson kick)
- Atlanta – T. Smith 97 kickoff return (N. Johnson kick)
- Atlanta – Clark 46 fumble return (N. Johnson kick)
- Pittsburgh – FG Anderson 21
- Atlanta – FG N. Johnson 49
- Pittsburgh – Foster 7 run (Anderson kick)
- Pittsburgh – Stone 4 pass from O'Donnell (Anderson kick)
- Pittsburgh – Thigpen 7 pass from O'Donnell (Anderson kick)
- Pittsburgh – Foster 1 run (Anderson kick)
- Pittsburgh – Davidson 18 fumble return (Anderson kick)

==== Week 6 (Sunday October 10, 1993): vs. San Diego Chargers ====
	1	2	3	4	Total
Chargers	0	3	0	0	**3**
**Steelers**	3	7	3	3	**16**

at Three Rivers Stadium, Pittsburgh, Pennsylvania

- Game time: 4:00 pm EDT
- Game weather: 47 °F (8 °C) (Partly Sunny)
- Game attendance: 55,264
- Referee: Gary Lane
- TV announcers: (NBC) Dan Hicks (play by play), Dan Hampton (color commentator)

Scoring drives:

- Pittsburgh – FG Anderson 37
- Pittsburgh – FG Anderson 34
- San Diego – FG Carney 33
- Pittsburgh – Kirkland 16 fumble return (Anderson kick)
- Pittsburgh – FG Anderson 35

==== Week 7 (Sunday October 17, 1993): vs. New Orleans Saints ====
	1	2	3	4	Total
Saints	0	0	0	14	**14**
**Steelers**	14	10	6	7	**37**

at Three Rivers Stadium, Pittsburgh, Pennsylvania

- Game time: 1:00 pm EDT
- Game weather: 65 °F (18 °C) (Light Rain)
- Game attendance: 56,056
- Referee: Howard Roe
- TV announcers: (CBS) Tim Ryan (play by play), Matt Millen (color commentator)

Scoring drives:

- Pittsburgh – Woodson 63 interception return (Anderson kick)
- Pittsburgh – Foster 20 pass from O'Donnell (Anderson kick)
- Pittsburgh – FG Anderson 40
- Pittsburgh – Foster 1 run (Anderson kick)
- Pittsburgh – FG Anderson 22
- Pittsburgh – FG Anderson 29
- Pittsburgh – Green 26 pass from Tomczak (Anderson kick)
- New Orleans – Small 3 pass from Buck (Anderson kick)
- New Orleans – Early 63 pass from Buck (Anderson kick)

==== Week 8 (Sunday October 24, 1993): at Cleveland Browns ====
	1	2	3	4	Total
Steelers	0	14	6	3	**23**
**Browns**	0	14	7	7	**28**

at Cleveland Municipal Stadium, Cleveland, Ohio

- Game time: 4:00 pm EDT
- Game weather:
- Game attendance: 78,118
- Referee: Tom White
- TV announcers: (NBC) Tom Hammond (play by play), Cris Collinsworth (color commentator)

Scoring drives:

- Cleveland – Jackson 62 pass from Testaverde (Stover kick)
- Cleveland – Metcalf 91 punt return (Stover kick)
- Pittsburgh – Foster 4 run (Anderson kick)
- Pittsburgh – Foster 1 run (Anderson kick)
- Pittsburgh – FG Anderson 30
- Cleveland – Wolfey 4 pass from Testaverde (Stover kick)
- Pittsburgh – FG Anderson 46
- Pittsburgh – FG Anderson 30
- Cleveland – Metcalf 75 punt return (Stover kick)

==== Week 10 (Sunday November 7, 1993): at Cincinnati Bengals ====
	1	2	3	4	Total
**Steelers**	0	14	0	10	**24**
Bengals	3	13	0	0	**16**

at Riverfront Stadium, Cincinnati

- Game time: 1:00 pm EST
- Game weather:
- Game attendance: 51,202
- Referee: Johnny Grier
- TV announcers: (NBC) Drew Goodman (play by play), Dan Hampton (color commentator)

Scoring drives:

- Cincinnati – FG Pelfrey 32
- Cincinnati – Williams 97 interception return (kick failed)
- Cincinnati – Query 7 pass from Schroeder (Pelfrey kick)
- Pittsburgh – Green 71 pass from O'Donnell (Anderson kick)
- Pittsburgh – Hoge 9 pass from O'Donnell (Anderson kick)
- Pittsburgh – Foster 1 run (Anderson kick)
- Pittsburgh – FG Anderson 23

==== Week 11 (Monday November 15, 1993): vs. Buffalo Bills ====
	1	2	3	4	Total
Bills	0	0	0	0	**0**
**Steelers**	7	3	10	3	**23**

at Three Rivers Stadium, Pittsburgh, Pennsylvania

- Game time: 9:00 pm EST
- Game weather: 50 °F (10 °C) (Cloudy)
- Game attendance: 60,265
- Referee: Ed Hochuli
- TV announcers: (ABC) Al Michaels (play by play), Frank Gifford & Dan Dierdorf (color commentators)

Scoring drives:

- Pittsburgh – Thompson 9 run (Anderson kick)
- Pittsburgh – FG Anderson 37
- Pittsburgh – Green 1 pass from O'Donnell (Anderson kick)
- Pittsburgh – FG Anderson 19
- Pittsburgh – FG Anderson 31

==== Week 12 (Sunday November 21, 1993): at Denver Broncos ====
	1	2	3	4	Total
Steelers	0	0	6	7	**13**
**Broncos**	10	10	14	3	**37**

at Mile High Stadium, Denver, Colorado

- Game time: 4:00 pm EST
- Game weather:
- Game attendance: 74,840
- Referee: Gordon McCarter
- TV announcers: (NBC) Bob Costas (play by play), Joe Gibbs (color commentator)

Scoring drives:

- Denver – FG Elam 48
- Denver – Delpino 1 run (Elam kick)
- Denver – Russell fumble recovery in end zone (Elam kick)
- Denver – FG Elam 27
- Pittsburgh – FG Anderson 37
- Denver – Delpino 1 run (Elam kick)
- Denver – V. Johnson 13 pass from Elway (Elam kick)
- Pittsburgh – FG Anderson 38
- Denver – FG Elam 28
- Pittsburgh – Thigpen 39 pass from Tomczak (Anderson kick)

==== Week 13 (Sunday November 28, 1993): at Houston Oilers ====
	1	2	3	4	Total
Steelers	0	3	0	0	**3**
**Oilers**	0	10	10	3	**23**

at Astrodome, Houston, Texas

- Game time: 8:00 pm EST
- Game weather: Dome
- Game attendance: 61,238
- Referee: Gerald Austin
- TV announcers: (ESPN) Mike Patrick (play by play), Joe Theismann (color commentator)

Scoring drives:

- Houston – FG Del Greco 43
- Pittsburgh – FG Anderson 42
- Houston – Brown 3 run (Del Greco kick)
- Houston – Jeffires 66 pass from Moon (Del Greco kick)
- Houston – FG Del Greco 21
- Houston – FG Del Greco 28

==== Week 14 (Sunday December 5, 1993): vs. New England Patriots ====
	1	2	3	4	Total
Patriots	14	0	0	0	**14**
**Steelers**	17	0	0	0	**17**

at Three Rivers Stadium, Pittsburgh, Pennsylvania

- Game time: 1:00 pm EST
- Game weather: 42 °F (6 °C) (Cloudy)
- Game attendance: 51,358
- Referee: Ron Blum
- TV announcers: (NBC) Don Criqui (play by play), Paul Maguire (color commentator)

Scoring drives:

- New England – Coates 3 pass from Bledsoe (Sisson kick)
- New England – Russell 3 run (Sisson kick)
- Pittsburgh – Hoge 5 pass from O'Donnell (Anderson kick)
- Pittsburgh – FG Anderson 35
- Pittsburgh – Hoge 1 pass from O'Donnell (Anderson kick)

==== Week 15 (Monday December 13, 1993): at Miami Dolphins ====
	1	2	3	4	Total
**Steelers**	0	7	7	7	**21**
Dolphins	3	3	0	14	**20**

at Joe Robbie Stadium, Miami, Florida

- Game time: 9:00 pm EST
- Game weather: 68 °F (20 °C) (Partly cloudy)
- Game attendance: 70,232
- Referee: Jerry Markbreit
- TV announcers: (ABC) Al Michaels (play by play), Frank Gifford & Dan Dierdorf (color commentators)

Scoring drives:

- Miami – FG Stoyanovich 22
- Pittsburgh – Thompson 3 run (Anderson kick)
- Pittsburgh – Hoge 2 pass from O'Donnell (Anderson kick)
- Miami – K. Jackson 3 pass from DeBerg (Stoyanovich kick)
- Miami – McDuffie 72 punt return (Stoyanovich kick)

==== Week 16 (Sunday December 19, 1993): vs. Houston Oilers ====
	1	2	3	4	Total
**Oilers**	14	6	3	3	**26**
Steelers	0	3	7	7	**17**

at Three Rivers Stadium, Pittsburgh, Pennsylvania

- Game time: 1:00 pm EST
- Game weather: 37 °F (3 °C) (Cloudy)
- Game attendance: 57,592
- Referee: Bernie Kukar
- TV announcers: (NBC) Tom Hammond (play by play), Cris Collinsworth (color commentator)

Scoring drives:

- Houston – G. Brown 38 pass from Moon (Del Greco kick)
- Houston – Orlando 38 interception return (Del Greco kick)
- Houston – FG Del Greco 34
- Houston – FG Del Greco 22
- Pittsburgh – FG Anderson 26
- Houston – FG Del Greco 33
- Pittsburgh – Green 36 pass from O'Donnell (Anderson kick)
- Houston – FG Del Greco 21
- Pittsburgh – Hoge 5 run (Anderson kick)

==== Week 17 (Sunday December 26, 1993): at Seattle Seahawks ====
	1	2	3	4	Total
Steelers	0	3	0	3	**6**
**Seahawks**	7	3	3	3	**16**

at Kingdome, Seattle, Washington

- Game time: 4:00 pm EST
- Game weather: Dome
- Game attendance: 51,814
- Referee: Bob McElwee
- TV announcers: (NBC) Charlie Jones (play by play), Todd Christensen (color commentator)

Scoring drives:

- Seattle – Green 2 pass from Mirer (Kasay kick)
- Seattle – FG Kasay 32
- Pittsburgh – FG Anderson 42
- Seattle – FG Kasay 48
- Pittsburgh – FG Anderson 43
- Seattle – FG Kasay 35

==== Week 18 (Sunday January 2, 1994): vs. Cleveland Browns ====
	1	2	3	4	Total
Browns	0	9	0	0	**9**
**Steelers**	0	3	3	10	**16**

at Three Rivers Stadium, Pittsburgh, Pennsylvania

- Game time: 1:00 pm EST
- Game weather: 32 °F (0 °C) (Cloudy)
- Game attendance: 49,208
- Referee: Dick Hantak
- TV announcers: (NBC) Marv Albert (play by play), Paul Maguire (color commentator)

Scoring drives:

- Pittsburgh – FG Anderson 36
- Cleveland – FG Stover 36
- Cleveland – FG Stover 47
- Cleveland – FG Stover 44
- Pittsburgh – FG Anderson 38
- Pittsburgh – Green 14 pass from O'Donnell (Anderson kick)
- Pittsburgh – FG Anderson 26

== Playoffs ==
=== Game summary ===
==== AFC Wild Card Playoff (Saturday January 8, 1994): at Kansas City Chiefs ====
	1	2	3	4	OT	Total
Steelers	7	10	0	7	0	24
Chiefs	7	0	3	14	3	27

at Arrowhead Stadium, Kansas City, Missouri

- Game time: 12:30 pm EST
- Game weather: 34 °F (1 °C) (Sunny)
- Game attendance: 75,868
- Referee: Gary Lane
- TV announcers: (ABC) Al Michaels (play by play), Frank Gifford & Dan Dierdorf (color commentators)

Scoring drives:

- Pittsburgh – Cooper 10 pass from O'Donnell (Anderson kick)
- Kansas City – Birden 23 pass from Krieg (Lowery kick)
- Pittsburgh – FG Anderson 30
- Pittsburgh – Mills 26 pass form O'Donnell (Anderson kick)
- Kansas City – FG Lowery 23
- Kansas City – Allen 2 run (Lowery kick)
- Pittsburgh – Green 22 pass from O'Donnell (Anderson kick)
- Kansas City – Barnett 7 pass from Montana (Lowery kick)
- Kansas City – FG Lowery 32
