= 1994 Pittsburgh Steelers season =

Pittsburgh Steelers 62nd US football season

- Owner: The Rooney Family
- General manager: Tom Donahoe
- Head coach: Bill Cowher
- Offensive coordinator: Ron Erhardt
- Defensive coordinator: Dom Capers
- Home stadium: Three Rivers Stadium

Results
- Record: 12–4
- Division place: 1st AFC Central
- Playoffs: Won Divisional Playoffs (vs. Browns) 29–9; Lost AFC Championship (vs. Chargers) 13–17
- All-Pros: 5: Dermontti Dawson (1st team); Kevin Greene (1st team); Greg Lloyd (1st team); Rod Woodson (1st team); Carnell Lake (2nd team)
- Pro Bowlers: 7: C Dermontti Dawson; OLB Kevin Greene; SS Carnell Lake; OLB Greg Lloyd; OT Duval Love; CB Rod Woodson; TE Eric Green
- Team MVP: Greg Lloyd
- Team ROY: Bam Morris

The 1994 Pittsburgh Steelers season was the franchise's 62nd season as a professional sports franchise and as a member of the National Football League.

This season marked as their third consecutive trip to the playoffs under head coach Bill Cowher. For the second time in Cowher's three seasons as head coach of the Steelers the team was the top seed in the AFC playoffs. Pittsburgh won its first playoff game since 1989 with a win in the divisional playoffs over their division rival Cleveland Browns, 29–9, to advance to their first AFC Championship Game in 10 years. The following week the Steelers failed to advance to the Super Bowl after losing to the San Diego Chargers 17–13, in the AFC Championship game.

== Offseason ==
Additions	Subtractions
TE Jonathan Hayes (Chiefs)	RB Leroy Thompson (Patriots)
RB John L. Williams (Seahawks)	DE Donald Evans (Jets)
DE Ray Seals (Buccaneers)	FB Merril Hoge (Bears)

=== NFL draft ===
1994 Pittsburgh Steelers draft
Round	Pick	Player	Position	College	Notes
1	17	Charles Johnson	Wide receiver	Colorado	
2	50	Brentson Buckner	Defensive end	Clemson	
3	88	Jason Gildon *	Linebacker	Oklahoma State	
3	91	Bam Morris	Running back	Texas Tech	
4	122	Ta'ase Faumui	Defensive end	Hawaii	
5	140	Myron Bell	Safety	Michigan State	
5	148	Gary Brown	Tackle	Georgia Tech	
6	178	Jim Miller	Quarterback	Michigan State	
6	180	Eric Ravotti	Linebacker	Penn State	
7	209	Brice Abrams	Running back	Michigan State	
Made roster * Made at least one Pro Bowl during career

=== Undrafted free agents ===
1994 undrafted free agents of note
Player	Position	College
Frank Adams	Cornerback	South Carolina
Mike Baker	Wide receiver	West Virginia
Dominic Callway	Cornerback	Memphis
Pheathur Edwards	Defensive end	Jackson State
Elbert Ellis	Wide receiver	Pittsburgh
Corey Holliday	Wide receiver	North Carolina
Latish Kinsler	Safety	Cincinnati
Curtis Parker	Tackle	North Carolina
Walter Rasby	Tight end	Wake Forest
Ed Robinson	Linebacker	Florida
Patrick Scott	Linebacker	South Carolina State
Chris Williams	Defensive end	Hampton

== Staff ==
1994 Pittsburgh Steelers staff
Front office: President – Daniel M. Rooney; Vice president – John R. McGinley; Vice president – Arthur J. Rooney, Jr.; Secretary & counsel – Arthur J. Rooney II; Administration advisor – Chuck Noll; Director of communications – Joe Gordon; Media relations coordinator – Rob Boulware; PR Assistant/Community Relations – Ron Miller; Controller – Michael J. Hagan; Assistant controller – Dan Ferens; Assistant controller – Jim Ellenberger; Ticket sales manager – Geraldine Glenn; Football operations; Director of football operations – Tom Donahoe; Scouting staff; College personnel coordinator – Tom Modrak; Pro personnel coordinator – Charles Bailey; College scout – Bob Schmitz; College scout – Max McCartney; College scout – Phil Kreidler; BLESTO College Scout – Bob Lane; Head coaches: Head coach – Bill Cowher; Offensive coaches: Offensive coordinator – Ron Erhardt; Running backs – Dick Hoak; Wide receivers – Chan Gailey; Tight ends – Pat Hodgson; Offensive line – Kent Stephenson	Defensive coaches: Defensive coordinator – Dom Capers; Defensive line – John Mitchell; Linebackers – Marvin Lewis; Defensive backs – Dick LeBeau; Special teams coaches: Special teams – Bobby April; Strength and conditioning: Conditioning coordinator – Chet Fuhrman; Medical staff; Ophthalmologist – Dr. Randy Beatty; Physician, orthopedic – Dr. James P. Bradley; Neurological surgery consultant – Dr. Joseph Maroon; Physician, M.D. – Dr. Richard Rydze; Physician, consultant – Dr. Abraham J. Twerski; Physician, M.D. – Dr. Anthony P. Yates; Training staff; Head trainer – John Norwig; Assistant trainer – Rick Burkholder; Equipment manager – Anthony Parisi; Field manager – Rodgers Freyvogel; Video coordinator – Bob McCartney; Video assistant – Pat Dolan; Player development coordinator – Anthony Griggs; Football operations – Bill Davis; Photographers – Mike Fabus, Bill Amatucci

Notable additions include Bam Morris, Jason Gildon and Brenston Buckner

== Roster ==
1994 Pittsburgh Steelers roster
Quarterbacks (QB): 16 Jim Miller; 14 Neil O'Donnell; 18 Mike Tomczak; Running backs (RB): 43 Steve Avery; 23 Anthony Daigle; 29 Barry Foster; 35 Fred McAfee; 33 Bam Morris; 22 John L. Williams FB; Wide receivers (WR): 80 Charles Davenport; 88 Andre Hastings; 81 Charles Johnson; 89 Ernie Mills; 20 Dwight Stone KR; 82 Yancey Thigpen; Tight ends (TE): 86 Eric Green; 85 Jonathan Hayes; 87 Craig Keith; 84 Walter Rasby	Offensive linemen (OL): 63 Dermontti Dawson C; 65 John Jackson T; 67 Duval Love G; 66 Lonnie Palelei G; 72 Leon Searcy T; 61 Tim Simpson G; 69 Ariel Solomon C; 73 Justin Strzelczyk G/T; Defensive linemen (DL): 96 Brentson Buckner DE; 78 Ta'ase Faumui DE; 76 Kevin Henry DE; 97 Ray Seals DE; 93 Joel Steed NT; 90 Jeff Zgonina NT	Linebackers (LB): 94 Chad Brown ILB; 92 Jason Gildon OLB; 91 Kevin Greene OLB; 99 Levon Kirkland ILB; 95 Greg Lloyd OLB; 55 Jerry Olsavsky ILB; 57 Eric Ravotti OLB; 51 Ed Robinson ILB; Defensive backs (DB): 40 Myron Bell SS; 21 Deon Figures CB; 36 Fred Foggie CB/S; 25 Gary Jones FS; 37 Carnell Lake SS; 24 Tim McKyer CB; 39 Darren Perry FS; 27 Willie Williams CB; 26 Rod Woodson CB; Special teams (ST): 1 Gary Anderson K; 60 Kendall Gammon LS; 3 Mark Royals P	Practice squad: 17 Corey Holliday WR; 28 Kenny McEntyre CB; 46 Patrick Scott LB; 74 Maa Tanuvasa DE; Reserve: 62 Todd Kalis G (IR); 56 Rico Mack LB (IR); 98 Gerald Williams DE (IR); Rookies in italics 53 active, 3 reserve, 4 practice squad

== Preseason ==
=== Schedule ===
Week	Date	Opponent	Result	Record	Venue
1	August 6	at Miami Dolphins	L 14–24	0–1	Joe Robbie Stadium
2	August 13	Los Angeles Raiders	W 29–17	1–1	Three Rivers Stadium
3	August 20	Indianapolis Colts	L 14–17	1–2	Three Rivers Stadium
4	August 26	at Washington Redskins	L 21–22	1–3	RFK Stadium

== Regular season ==
=== Schedule ===
Week	Date	Opponent	Result	Record	Venue
1	September 4	Dallas Cowboys	**L** 9–26	0–1	Three Rivers Stadium
2	September 11	at **Cleveland Browns**	**W** 17–10	1–1	Cleveland Municipal Stadium
3	September 18	Indianapolis Colts	**W** 31–21	2–1	Three Rivers Stadium
4	September 25	at Seattle Seahawks	**L** 13–30	2–2	Husky Stadium
5	October 3	**Houston Oilers**	**W** 30–14	3–2	Three Rivers Stadium
6	Bye				
7	October 16	**Cincinnati Bengals**	**W** 14–10	4–2	Three Rivers Stadium
8	October 23	at New York Giants	**W** 10–6	5–2	Giants Stadium
9	October 30	at Arizona Cardinals	**L** 17–20 (OT)	5–3	Sun Devil Stadium
10	November 6	at **Houston Oilers**	**W** 12–9 (OT)	6–3	Astrodome
11	November 14	Buffalo Bills	**W** 23–10	7–3	Three Rivers Stadium
12	November 20	Miami Dolphins	**W** 16–13 (OT)	8–3	Three Rivers Stadium
13	November 27	at Los Angeles Raiders	**W** 21–3	9–3	Los Angeles Memorial Coliseum
14	December 4	at **Cincinnati Bengals**	**W** 38–15	10–3	Riverfront Stadium
15	December 11	Philadelphia Eagles	**W** 14–3	11–3	Three Rivers Stadium
16	December 18	**Cleveland Browns**	**W** 17–7	12–3	Three Rivers Stadium
17	December 24	at San Diego Chargers	**L** 34–37	12–4	Jack Murphy Stadium
Note: Intra-division opponents are in **bold** text.

=== Standings ===
AFC Central
	W	L	T	PCT	PF	PA	STK
^{(1)} Pittsburgh Steelers	12	4	0	.750	316	234	L1
^{(4)} Cleveland Browns	11	5	0	.688	340	204	W1
Cincinnati Bengals	3	13	0	.188	276	406	W1
Houston Oilers	2	14	0	.125	226	352	W1

=== Game summaries ===
==== Week 1 (Sunday September 4, 1994): vs. Dallas Cowboys ====
	1	2	3	4	Total
**Cowboys**	3	13	0	10	**26**
Steelers	0	3	0	6	**9**

at Three Rivers Stadium, Pittsburgh, Pennsylvania

- Game time: 4:00 pm EDT
- Game weather: 68 °F (20 °C) (Partly cloudy)
- Game attendance: 60,156
- Referee: Bob McElwee
- TV announcers: (FOX) Pat Summerall (play by play), John Madden (color commentator)

Scoring drives:

- Dallas – FG Boniol 40
- Dallas – FG Boniol 31
- Pittsburgh – FG Anderson 41
- Dallas – Johnston 2 pass from Aikman (Boniol kick)
- Dallas – FG Boniol 21
- Dallas – FG Boniol 32
- Pittsburgh – O'Donnell 2 run (pass failed)
- Dallas – E. Smith 2 run (Boniol kick)

==== Week 2 (Sunday September 11, 1994): at Cleveland Browns ====
	1	2	3	4	Total
**Steelers**	0	14	0	3	**17**
Browns	7	3	0	0	**10**

at Cleveland Municipal Stadium, Cleveland, Ohio

- Game time: 1:00 pm EDT
- Game weather:Sunny
- Game attendance: 77,774
- Referee: Ron Blum
- TV announcers: (NBC) Tom Hammond (play by play), Cris Collinsworth (color commentator)

Scoring drives:

- Cleveland – Reeves 1 pass from Testaverde (Stover kick)
- Cleveland – FG Stover 23
- Pittsburgh – Thigpen 31 pass from O'Donnell (Anderson kick)
- Pittsburgh – Foster 1 run (Anderson kick)
- Pittsburgh – FG Anderson 25

==== Week 3 (Sunday September 18, 1994): vs. Indianapolis Colts ====
	1	2	3	4	Total
Colts	7	7	7	0	**21**
**Steelers**	0	17	0	14	**31**

at Three Rivers Stadium, Pittsburgh, Pennsylvania

- Game time: 1:00 pm EDT
- Game weather: 66 °F (19 °C) (Mostly sunny)
- Game attendance: 54,040
- Referee: Gerry Austin
- TV announcers: (NBC) Don Criqui (play by play), Beasley Reece (color commentator)

Scoring drives:

- Indianapolis – Humphrey 95 kickoff return (Biasucci kick)
- Indianapolis – Coryatt 78 fumble return (Biasucci kick)
- Pittsburgh – Green 27 pass from O'Donnell (Anderson kick)
- Pittsburgh – Foster 29 run (Anderson kick)
- Pittsburgh – FG Anderson 46
- Indianapolis – Dawkins 19 pass from Harbaugh (Biasucci kick)
- Pittsburgh – Williams 8 pass from O'Donnell (Anderson kick)
- Pittsburgh – Morris 1 run (Anderson kick)

==== Week 4 (Sunday September 25, 1994): at Seattle Seahawks ====
	1	2	3	4	Total
Steelers	3	3	0	7	**13**
**Seahawks**	7	13	0	10	**30**

at Husky Stadium, Seattle, Washington

- Game time: 6:00 pm EDT
- Game weather:
- Game attendance: 59,637
- Referee: Red Cashion
- TV announcers: (NBC – Local) Don Criqui (play by play), Todd Christensen (color commentator)

This game was played at Husky Stadium due to ceiling tiles falling off in the Kingdome.

Scoring drives:

- Seattle – Warren 3 run (Kasay kick)
- Pittsburgh – FG Anderson 31
- Seattle – FG Kasay 31
- Seattle – Junkin 1 pass from Mirer (Kasay kick)
- Seattle – FG Kasay 40
- Pittsburgh – FG Anderson 38
- Seattle – Watters 35 interception return (Kasay kick)
- Pittsburgh – C. Johnson 36 pass from O'Donnell (Anderson kick)
- Seattle – FG Kasay 31

==== Week 5 (Monday October 3, 1994): vs. Houston Oilers ====
	1	2	3	4	Total
Oilers	0	0	0	14	**14**
**Steelers**	20	3	0	7	**30**

at Three Rivers Stadium, Pittsburgh, Pennsylvania

- Game time: 9:00 pm EDT
- Game weather: 51 °F (11 °C) (Clear)
- Game attendance: 57,274
- Referee: Larry Nemmers
- TV announcers: (ABC) Al Michaels (play by play), Frank Gifford & Dan Dierdorf (color commentators), Lynn Swann (sideline reporter)

Scoring drives:

- Pittsburgh – FG Anderson 42
- Pittsburgh – FG Anderson 25
- Pittsburgh – E. Green 3 pass from O'Donnell (Anderson kick)
- Pittsburgh – Foster 1 run (Anderson kick)
- Pittsburgh – FG Anderson 22
- Pittsburgh – Morris 2 run (Anderson kick)
- Houston – Givins 76 pass from Richardson (Del Greco kick)
- Houston – Jeffires 2 pass from Richardson (Del Greco kick)

==== Week 7 (Sunday October 16, 1994): vs. Cincinnati Bengals ====
	1	2	3	4	Total
Bengals	0	0	7	3	**10**
**Steelers**	0	14	0	0	**14**

at Three Rivers Stadium, Pittsburgh, Pennsylvania

- Game time: 1:00 pm EDT
- Game weather: 67 °F (19 °C) (Mostly sunny)
- Game attendance: 55,353
- Referee: Johnny Grier
- TV announcers: (NBC) Don Criqui (play by play), Beasley Reece (color commentator)

Scoring drives:

- Pittsburgh – Williams 13 pass from O'Donnell (Anderson kick)
- Pittsburgh – Mills 14 pass from O'Donnell (Anderson kick)
- Cincinnati – Cothran 7 pass from Johnson (Pelfrey kick)
- Cincinnati – FG Pelfrey 47

==== Week 8 (Sunday October 23, 1994): at New York Giants ====
	1	2	3	4	Total
**Steelers**	0	3	0	7	**10**
Giants	3	3	0	0	**6**

at Giants Stadium, East Rutherford, New Jersey

- Game time: 1:00 pm EDT
- Game weather:
- Game attendance: 71,819
- Referee: Bernie Kukar
- TV announcers: (NBC) Dick Enberg (play by play), Bob Trumpy (color commentator)

Scoring drives:

- New York Giants – FG Treadwell 19
- New York Giants – FG Daluiso 49
- Pittsburgh – FG Anderson 29
- Pittsburgh – Morris 6 run (Anderson kick)

==== Week 9 (Sunday October 30, 1994): at Arizona Cardinals ====
Week 9: Pittsburgh Steelers at Arizona Cardinals – Game summary

Quarter	1	2	3	4	OT	Total
Steelers (5–3)	0	14	0	3	0	**17**
Cardinals (3–5)	7	10	0	0	3	**20**

at Sun Devil Stadium • Tempe, Arizona

- Date: October 30, 1994
- Game time: 8:00 p.m. EST
- Game weather: Clear; 73 °F (23 °C), relative humidity 39%, wind 4 miles per hour (6.4 km/h; 3.5 kn)
- Game attendance: 73,400
- Referee: Ron Blum
- TV announcers (TNT): Gary Bender (play-by-play), Pat Haden (color commentator) and Kevin Kiley (sidelines)

Team	Category	Player	Statistics
PIT	Passing	Neil O'Donnell	18/31, 260 YDS, 1 TD, 1 INT
PIT	Rushing	Bam Morris	14 CAR, 72 YDS, 1 TD
PIT	Receiving	John L. Williams	6 REC, 50 YDS
ARI	Passing	Steve Beuerlein	13/26, 251 YDS
ARI	Rushing	Ronald Moore	30 CAR, 67 YDS, 1 TD
ARI	Receiving	Ricky Proehl; Gary Clark	3 REC, 94 YDS; 3 REC, 38 YDS

Scoring summary

Quarter	Time	Drive			Team	Scoring information	Score	
Quarter	Time	Plays	Yards	TOP	Team	Scoring information	PIT	ARI
1	3:50	3	71	1:36	Cardinals	Centers 4-yard touchdown run, Davis kick good	0	7
2	12:58	6	51	2:09	Steelers	Morris 11-yard touchdown run, Anderson kick good	7	7
2	3:13	15	67	9:45	Cardinals	20-yard field goal by Davis	7	10
2	2:53	2	60	0:20	Steelers	Thigpen 60-yard touchdown reception from O'Donnell, Anderson kick good	14	10
2	1:10	8	74	1:43	Cardinals	Moore 1-yard touchdown run, Davis kick good	14	17
4	0:51	9	78	2:12	Steelers	39-yard field goal by Adnerson	17	17
OT	13:28	4	–1	1:22	Cardinals	51-yard field goal by Davis	17	20
"TOP" = time of possession. For other American football terms, see Glossary of American football.							17	20

- Point spread: Steelers +2
- Over/Under: 35.0 **(over)**
- Time of Game:

Steelers	Game Statistics	Cardinals
12	First downs	16
20–85	Rushes–yards	37–99
260	Passing yards	251
18–31–0	Passes	13–27–0
4–28	Sacked–yards	2–15
232	Net passing yards	236
317	Total yards	335
125	Return yards	94
6–41.3	Punts	7–43.3
2–2	Fumbles–lost	1–1
3	Turnovers	1
7–36	Penalties–yards	4–45
3–11	Third Down Conversion	3–14
0–1	Fourth Down Conversion	1–1
25:11	Time of possession	36:29

Starting Lineups

Position	Starting Lineups at Arizona
**Offense**
QB	Neil O'Donnell
RB	Bam Morris
FB	John L. Williams
WR	Andre Hastings
WR	Charles Johnson
TE	Eric Green
LT	John Jackson
LG	Duval Love
C	Dermontti Dawson
RG	Todd Kalis
RT	Leon Searcy
**Defense**
LDE	Gerald Williams
NT	Joel Steed
RDE	Kevin Henry
LOLB	Kevin Greene
LILB	Levon Kirkland
RILB	CChad Brown
ROLB	Greg Lloyd
LCB	Rod Woodson
RCB	Deon Figures
SS	Carnell Lake
FS	Darren Perry

Individual stats

Steelers Passing
	C/ATT^{1}	Yds	TD	INT	Sk	Yds	LG^{3}	Rate
O'Donnell	18/31	260	1	1	4	28	60	82.7

Steelers Rushing
	Car^{2}	Yds	TD	LG^{3}
Morris	14	72	1	12
O'Donnell	3	13	0	8
Anderson	1	3	0	3
J. Williams	1	2	0	2
Johnson	1	–5	0	–5

Steelers Receiving
	Rec^{4}	Yds	TD	LG^{3}
J. Williams	6	50	0	19
Green	5	97	0	46
Thigpen	3	95	1	60
Morris	2	12	0	7
Johnson	1	6	0	6
Hastings	1	0	0	0

Steelers Kicking
	FGM–FGA	XPM–XPA
Anderson	2–2	1–1

Steelers Punting
	Pnt	Yds	Y/P	Lng	Blck
Royals	6	248	41.3	55	

Steelers Kick Returns
	Ret	Yds	Y/Rt	TD	Lng
Johnson	2	39	19.5	0	
Thigpen	1	27	27.0	0	
Woodson	1	20	20.0	0	

Steelers Punt Returns
	Ret	Yds	Y/Rt	TD	Lng
Woodson	3	29	9.7	0	0
Johnson	1	10	10.0	0	0

Steelers Sacks
	Sacks
Lloyd	2.0

Steelers Tackles
	Comb	Solp	Ast
Brown	12	10	2
Kirkland	11	6	5
Perry	10	5	5
Lloyd	9	8	1
G. Williams	7	3	4
Lake	5	5	0
Steed	4	4	0
Figures	3	2	1
Seals	3	1	2
Greene	2	1	1
Woodson	2	2	0
Bell	1	1	0
Henry	1	1	0

==== Week 10 (Sunday November 6, 1994): at Houston Oilers ====
	1	2	3	4	OT	Total
**Steelers**	0	6	0	3	3	**12**
Oilers	3	3	0	3	0	**9**

at Astrodome, Houston

- Game time: 1:00 pm EST
- Game weather: Dome
- Game attendance: 47,822
- Referee: Jerry Markbreit
- TV announcers: (NBC) Don Criqui (play by play), Todd Christensen (color commentator)

Scoring drives:

- Houston – FG Del Greco 32
- Pittsburgh – FG Anderson 50
- Pittsburgh – FG Anderson 39
- Houston – FG Del Greco 49
- Pittsburgh – FG Anderson 37
- Houston – FG Del Greco 38
- Pittsburgh – FG Anderson 40

==== Week 11 (Monday November 14, 1994): vs. Buffalo Bills ====
	1	2	3	4	Total
Bills	0	3	7	0	**10**
**Steelers**	10	6	7	0	**23**

at Three Rivers Stadium, Pittsburgh, Pennsylvania

- Game time: 9:00 pm EST
- Game weather: 64 °F (18 °C) (Cloudy)
- Game attendance: 59,019
- Referee: Ed Hochuli
- TV announcers: (ABC) Al Michaels (play by play), Frank Gifford & Dan Dierdorf (color commentators), Lynn Swann (sideline reporter)

Scoring drives:

- Pittsburgh – FG Anderson 39
- Pittsburgh – Woodson 37 interception return (Anderson kick)
- Pittsburgh – FG Anderson 39
- Buffalo – FG Christie 52
- Pittsburgh – FG Anderson 30
- Buffalo – Reed 19 pass from Kelly (Christie kick)
- Pittsburgh – G. Williams recovered fumble in end zone (Anderson kick)

==== Week 12 (Sunday November 20, 1994): vs. Miami Dolphins ====
	1	2	3	4	OT	Total
Dolphins	0	7	3	3	0	**13**
**Steelers**	3	3	0	7	3	**16**

at Three Rivers Stadium, Pittsburgh, Pennsylvania

- Game time: 1:00 pm EST
- Game weather: 55 °F (13 °C) (Partly sunny)
- Game attendance: 59,148
- Referee: Tom White
- TV announcers: (NBC) Jim Lampley (play by play), Todd Christensen (color commentator)

Scoring drives:

- PIttsburgh – FG Anderson 19
- Miami – Jackson 2 pass from Marino (Stoyanovich kick)
- Pittsburgh – FG Anderson 48
- Miami – FG Stoyanovich 34
- Pittsburgh – Foster 10 run (Anderson kick)
- Miami – FG Stoyanovich 48
- Pittsburgh – FG Anderson 39

==== Week 13 (Sunday November 27, 1994): at Los Angeles Raiders ====
	1	2	3	4	Total
**Steelers**	7	0	0	14	**21**
Raiders	0	3	0	0	**3**

at Los Angeles Memorial Coliseum, Los Angeles

- Game time: 4:00 pm EST
- Game weather:
- Game attendance: 58,327
- Referee: Red Cashion
- TV announcers: (NBC) Charlie Jones (play by play), Randy Cross (color commentator)

Scoring drives:

- Pittsburgh – Thigpen 27 pass from Tomczak (Anderson kick)
- Los Angeles Raiders – FG Jaeger 32
- Pittsburgh – Green 15 pass from Tomczak (Anderson kick)
- Pittsburgh – Morris 3 run (Anderson kick)

==== Week 14 (Sunday December 4, 1994): at Cincinnati Bengals ====
	1	2	3	4	Total
**Steelers**	7	7	7	17	**38**
Bengals	7	0	0	8	**15**

at Riverfront Stadium, Cincinnati

- Game time: 1:00 pm EST
- Game weather:
- Game attendance: 53,401
- Referee: Gordon McCarter
- TV announcers: (NBC) Charlie Jones (play by play), Randy Cross (color commentator)

Scoring drives:

- Pittsburgh – Morris 1 run (Anderson kick)
- Cincinnati – Pickens 7 pass from Blake (Pelfrey kick)
- Pittsburgh – Green 5 pass from O'Donnell (Anderson kick)
- Pittsburgh – Morris 8 run (Anderson kick)
- Pittsburgh – FG Anderson 41
- Pittsburgh – Woodson 27 interception return (Anderson kick)
- Cincinnati – Blake 5 run (Blake run)
- Pittsburgh – Hayes 3 pass from O'Donnell (Anderson kick)

==== Week 15 (Sunday December 11, 1994): vs. Philadelphia Eagles ====
	1	2	3	4	Total
Eagles	3	0	0	0	**3**
**Steelers**	0	0	0	14	**14**

at Three Rivers Stadium, Pittsburgh, Pennsylvania

- Game time: 1:00 pm EST
- Game weather: 31 °F (−1 °C) (Flurries)
- Game attendance: 55,474
- Referee: Bob McElwee
- TV announcers: (FOX) Kevin Harlan (play by play), Jerry Glanville (color commentator)

Scoring drives:

- Philadelphia – FG Murray 21
- Pittsburgh – Hastings 18 pass from O'Donnell (Anderson kick)
- Pittsburgh – Williams 3 run (Anderson kick)

==== Week 16 (Sunday December 18, 1994): vs. Cleveland Browns ====
	1	2	3	4	Total
Browns	0	7	0	0	**7**
**Steelers**	14	0	0	3	**17**

at Three Rivers Stadium, Pittsburgh, Pennsylvania

- Game time: 4:00 pm EST
- Game weather: 38 °F (3 °C) (Cloudy)
- Game attendance: 60,808
- Referee: Ed Hochuli
- TV announcers: (NBC) Charlie Jones (play by play), Randy Cross (color commentator)

Scoring drives:

- PIttsburgh – Thigpen 40 pass from O'Donnell (Anderson kick)
- Pittsburgh – Foster 1 run (Anderson kick)
- Cleveland – Carrier 14 pass from Testaverde (Stover kick)
- Pittsburgh – FG Anderson 49

==== Week 17 (Saturday December 24, 1994): at San Diego Chargers ====
	1	2	3	4	Total
Steelers	0	13	6	15	**34**
**Chargers**	3	14	7	13	**37**

at Jack Murphy Stadium, San Diego

- Game time: 4:00 pm EST
- Game weather:
- Game attendance: 58,379
- Referee: Dick Hantak
- TV announcers: (NBC) Jim Lampley (play by play), Todd Christensen (color commentator)

Scoring drives:

- San Diego – FG Carney 37
- Pittsburgh – FG Anderson 28
- San Diego – Coleman 90 kickoff return (Carney kick)
- Pittsburgh – FG Anderson 28
- Pittsburgh – C. Johnson 19 pass from O'Donnell (Anderson kick)
- San Diego – Seay 2 pass from Humphries (Carney kick)
- San Diego – Means 2 run (Carney kick)
- Pittsburgh – McAffee 6 run (pass failed)
- Pittsburgh – C. Johnson 84 pass from Tomczak (Stone pass from Tomczak)
- San Diego – FG Carney 40
- Pittsburgh – Hastings 11 pass from Tomczak (Anderson kick)
- San Diego – Means 20 run (Carney kick)
- San Diego – FG Carney 32

== Playoffs ==
=== Game summaries ===
==== AFC Divisional Playoff (Saturday January 7, 1995): vs. Cleveland Browns ====
	1	2	3	4	Total
Browns	0	3	0	6	9
Steelers	3	21	3	2	29

at Three Rivers Stadium, Pittsburgh, Pennsylvania

- Game time: 12:30 pm EST
- Game weather: 29 °F (−2 °C) (Light snow)
- Game attendance: 58,185
- Referee: Bob McElwee
- TV announcers: (NBC) Marv Albert (play by play), Paul Maguire (color commentator)

Scoring drives:

- Pittsburgh – FG Anderson 39
- Pittsburgh – Green 2 pass from O'Donnell (Anderson kick)
- Pittsburgh – a Williams 26 run (Anderson kick)
- Cleveland – FG Stover 22
- Pittsburgh – Thigpen 9 pass from O'Donnell (Anderson kick)
- Pittsburgh – FG Anderson 40
- Cleveland – McCardell 20 pass from Testaverde (pass failed)
- Pittsburgh – Safety, Lake sacked Testaverde in end zone

==== AFC Championship game (Sunday January 15, 1995): vs. San Diego Chargers ====
	1	2	3	4	Total
Chargers	0	3	7	7	17
Steelers	7	3	3	0	13

at Three Rivers Stadium, Pittsburgh, Pennsylvania

- Game time: 12:30 pm EST
- Game weather: 59 °F (15 °C) (Rain & Fog)
- Game attendance: 61,545
- Referee: Gerry Austin
- TV announcers: (NBC) Dick Enberg (play by play), Bob Trumpy (color commentator)

Scoring drives:

- PIttsburgh – Williams 16 pass from O'Donnell (Anderson kick)
- San Diego – FG Carney 20
- Pittsburgh – FG Anderson 39
- Pittsburgh – FG Anderson 23
- San Diego – Pupunu 43 pass from Humphries (Carney kick)
- San Diego – Martin 43 pass from Humphries (Carney kick)

== Honors and awards ==
=== Pro Bowl Representatives ===
See: 1995 Pro Bowl

- No. 26 Rod Woodson-Cornerback
- No. 37 Carnell Lake-Safety
- No. 63 Dermontti Dawson-Center
- No. 67 Duval Love-Offensive Guard
- No. 86 Eric Green-Tight End
- No. 91 Kevin Greene-Outside Linebacker
- No. 95 Greg Lloyd-Outside Linebacker
