= 1995 Pro Bowl =

National Football League all-star game

1995 NFL Pro Bowl
AFC	NFC
41	13
Head coach: Bill Cowher (Pittsburgh Steelers)	Head coach: Barry Switzer (Dallas Cowboys)
	1	2	3	4	Total
AFC	0	17	3	21	41
NFC	10	0	3	0	13
- Date: February 5, 1995
- Stadium: Aloha Stadium; Honolulu, Hawaii
- MVP: Marshall Faulk (Indianapolis Colts)
- Referee: Larry Nemmers
- Attendance: 49,121

TV in the United States
- Network: ABC

The 1995 Pro Bowl was the NFL's all-star game for the 1994 season. The game was played on February 5, 1995, at Aloha Stadium in Honolulu, Hawaii. The final Score was AFC 41, NFC 13. This was the AFC's largest margin of victory since the AFL-NFL merger. Rookie Marshall Faulk of the Indianapolis Colts rushed for a Pro Bowl record 180 yards and was the game's MVP. Chris Warren of the Seattle Seahawks added 127 yards rushing as the AFC posted records for rushing yards (400) and total yards (552). Both Warren and Faulk broke the Pro Bowl rushing record, formerly held by O. J. Simpson.

The coaches were Dallas’ Barry Switzer and Bill Cowher of the Pittsburgh Steelers. The game was viewed by 49,121 at Aloha Stadium. The referee was Larry Nemmers.

== Rosters ==
AFC Roster
QB
Drew Bledsoe – N.E.
John Elway – DEN
Jeff Hostetler – L.A.
Dan Marino – MIA

RB
Leroy Hoard – CLE
Marshall Faulk – IND
Natrone Means – SD
Eric Metcalf – CLE
Chris Warren – SEA

WR
Tim Brown – LA
Irving Fryar – MIA
Rob Moore – NYJ
Andre Reed – BUF
Steve Tasker – BUF

TE
Ben Coates – N.E.
Shannon Sharpe – DEN
Eric Green – PIT (injury replacement)

OL
Bruce Armstrong – N.E.
Dermontti Dawson – PIT
Kevin Gogan – LA
Duval Love – PIT
Bruce Matthews – HOU
Keith Sims – MIA
Richmond Webb – MIA
Steve Wisniewski – LA
Gary Zimmerman – DEN

DL
Rob Burnett – CLE
Cortez Kennedy – SEA
Chester McGlockton – LA
Michael Dean Perry – CLE
Bruce Smith – BUF
Neil Smith – K.C.
Leslie O'Neal – SD

LB
Bryan Cox – MIA
Kevin Greene – PIT
Pepper Johnson – CLE
Greg Lloyd – PIT
Junior Seau – SD
Derrick Thomas – K.C.

DB
Steve Atwater – DEN
Dale Carter – K.C.
Carnell Lake – PIT
Darryll Lewis – HOU
Terry McDaniel – LA
Eric Turner – CLE
Rod Woodson – PIT

K
John Carney – SD

P
Rick Tuten – SEA

NFC Roster
QB
Troy Aikman – DAL
Warren Moon – MIN
Steve Young – SF

RB
Jerome Bettis – LA
Daryl Johnston – DAL
Barry Sanders – DET
Emmitt Smith – DAL
Ricky Watters – SF

WR
Cris Carter – MIN
Michael Irvin – DAL
Terance Mathis – ATL
Herman Moore – DET
Jerry Rice – SF
Sterling Sharpe – GB

TE
Brent Jones – SF
Jay Novacek – DAL

OL
Lomas Brown – DET
Randall McDaniel – MIN
Nate Newton – DAL
Bart Oates – SF
William Roaf – N.O.
Jesse Sapolu – SF
Mark Stepnoski – DAL
Mark Tuinei – DAL
Kevin Glover - DET

DL
Chris Doleman – ATL
William Fuller – PHI
Charles Haley – DAL
Leon Lett – DAL
Wayne Martin – NO
John Randle – MIN
Dana Stubblefield – SF
Reggie White – GB

LB
Jack Del Rio – MIN
Ken Harvey – WAS
Seth Joyner – ARI
Bryce Paup – GB
Chris Spielman – DET
Jessie Tuggle – ATL

DB
Eric Allen – PHI
Merton Hanks – SF
Tim McDonald – SF
Deion Sanders – SF
Elbert Shelley – ATL
Aeneas Williams – ARI
Darren Woodson – DAL

K
Fuad Reveiz – MIN

P
Reggie Roby – WAS
