= Carnell Lake =

American football player and coach (born 1967)

No. 37
- Position: Safety

Personal information
- Born: July 15, 1967 (age 59); Salt Lake City, Utah, U.S.
- Listed height: 6 ft 1 in (1.85 m)
- Listed weight: 213 lb (97 kg)

Career information
- High school: Culver City (Culver City, California)
- College: UCLA
- NFL draft: 1989: 2nd round, 34th overall pick

Career history

Playing
- Pittsburgh Steelers (1989–1998); Jacksonville Jaguars (1999–2000); Baltimore Ravens (2001)

Coaching
- Pittsburgh Steelers (2011–2017) Defensive backs coach; Tampa Bay Bandits (2022) Defensive backs coach; Memphis Showboats (2023–2024) Defensive coordinator

Awards and highlights
- 2× First-team All-Pro (1997, 1999); 3× Second-team All-Pro (1992, 1994, 1995); 5× Pro Bowl (1994–1997, 1999); NFL 1990s All-Decade Team; PFWA All-Rookie Team (1989); Pittsburgh Steelers All-Time Team; Pittsburgh Steelers Hall of Honor; First-team All-American (1988); Second-team All-American (1987); 2× First-team All-Pac-10 (1987, 1988)

Career NFL statistics
- Tackles: 823
- Interceptions: 16
- Sacks: 25
- Forced fumbles: 15
- Fumble recoveries: 17
- Touchdowns: 5
- Stats at Pro Football Reference

Carnell Augustino Lake (born July 15, 1967) is an American former professional football player and coach. He was a safety in the National Football League (NFL). He is a member of the NFL 1990s All-Decade Team. He was the cornerbacks coach for the UCLA Bruins under head coach Rick Neuheisel in 2009 before leaving after one season for family reasons. He was the Pittsburgh Steelers defensive backs coach until February 2018.

== College career ==
Lake played linebacker for the UCLA Bruins from 1985 through 1988. He finished his college career with 45.5 tackles for loss and 25.5 sacks. Those totals, as of the 2016 season, were first and fourth, respectively, in UCLA football history.

“We don't have a better player on the team than Carnell Lake. He's marvelous.”

— Terry Donahue
UCLA Bruins' head football coach (1987)

== NFL career ==
On January 15, 1989, Lake played in the East-West Shrine Game and was part of the West who lost 24–6 to the East. On January 21, 1989, Lake was part of Los Angeles Rams' head coach John Robinson's South team that defeated the North 13–12. Lake played safety in both games as multiple teams were interested in moving him to safety as he was considered to be too small to continue to play linebacker professionally.

Pre-draft measurables
Height	Weight	40-yard dash	10-yard split	20-yard split	20-yard shuttle	Vertical jump	Broad jump	Bench press
6 ft 0 3/4 in (1.85 m)	205 lb (93 kg)	4.36 s	1.55 s	2.61 s	4.29 s	35.5 in (0.90 m)	9 ft 9 in (2.97 m)	15 reps
All values from NFL Combine

=== Pittsburgh Steelers ===
The Pittsburgh Steelers selected Lake in the second round (34th overall) of the 1989 NFL draft. Lake was the third safety drafted in 1989.

==== 1989 ====
On May 10, 1989, the Pittsburgh Steelers signed Lake to a three-year, $850,000 contract.

Head coach Chuck Noll named Lake the starting strong safety to begin his rookie season, alongside free safety Thomas Everett and cornerbacks Rod Woodson and Dwayne Woodruff. Lake played his first three seasons under defensive backs coach John Fox.

He made his professional regular season debut and first career start in the Pittsburgh Steelers' season-opening 51–0 loss to the Cleveland Browns. On October 15, 1989, Lake recorded five combined tackles, made two pass deflections, recovered a fumble, and made his first career interception during a 17–7 win at the Cleveland Browns in Week 6. Lake made a one-handed interception off of a pass by Browns' quarterback Bernie Kosar. His exceptional performance in Week 6 earned him AFC Defensive Player of the Week Award. In Week 9, Lake made his first career sack on Broncos' quarterback John Elway in the Steelers' 34–7 loss at the Denver Broncos. He finished his rookie season in 1989 with 70 combined tackles, six fumble recoveries, two forced fumbles, one interception, and one sack in 15 games and 15 starts.

The Pittsburgh Steelers finished the season third in the AFC Central with a 9–7 record and earned a wildcard berth. On December 31, 1989, Lake started in his first career playoff game as the Steelers defeated the Houston Oilers 26–23 in the AFC Wildcard Game. The following week, they lost 24–23 at the Denver Broncos in the AFC Divisional Round.

==== 1990 ====
The Pittsburgh Steelers promoted linebackers coach Dave Brazil to defensive coordinator after Rod Rust accepted the head coaching position with the New England Patriots. Brazil retained Lake and Thomas Everett as the starting safety tandem in 1990. Lake started in all 16 games in 1990 and recorded 67 combined tackles, two forced fumbles, a fumble recovery, an interception, and a sack.

==== 1991 ====
Head coach Chuck Noll retained Lake and Thomas Everett as the starting safety tandem in 1991, along with cornerbacks Rod Woodson and D. J. Johnson. On December 27, 1991, Pittsburgh Steelers' head coach Chuck Noll announced his decision to retire after the Steelers finished with a 7–9 record in 1991. He started in all 16 games in 1991 and recorded 83 combined tackles and a sack.

==== 1992 ====
On January 21, 1992, the Pittsburgh Steelers announced the hiring of former Kansas City Chiefs' defensive coordinator Bill Cowher as their new head coach. On January 31, 1992, Cowher announced the hiring of former New Orleans Saints' secondary coach Dom Capers as their new defensive coordinator.

On August 24, 1992, the Pittsburgh Steelers signed Lake to a three-year contract.

Head coach Bill Cowher retained Lake the starting strong safety in 1992. Lake started alongside free safety Darren Perry and cornerbacks Rod Woodson and D.J. Johnson. He started in all 16 games in 1992 and recorded 85 combined tackles and two sacks.

==== 1993 ====
Lake and Darren Perry returned as the starting safety duo in 1993 and played under defensive backs coach Dick LeBeau. On September 12, 1993, Lake collected a season-high 11 combined tackles, but was carted off the field due to an injury as the Steelers lost 27–0 at the Los Angeles Rams in Week 2. His injury sidelined him for the next two games (Weeks 3–4). In Week 13, Lake recorded six combined tackles and made a season-high two sacks on Oilers quarterback Warren Moon in the Steelers' 23–3 loss at the Houston Oilers. On December 13, 1993, Lake recorded six combined tackles and made an interception off a pass by Dolphins' quarterback Steve DeBerg during a 21–20 victory at the Miami Dolphins in Week 13. He finished the season with 91 combined tackles, five sacks, a career-high four interceptions, two fumble recoveries, and a forced fumble in 14 games and 14 starts.

==== 1994 ====
Head coach Bill Cowher retained Lake and Darren Perry as the starting safeties in 1994. He started in the Pittsburgh Steelers' season-opener against the Dallas Cowboys and recorded a season-high 12 combined tackles in their 26–9 loss. On December 16, 1994, it was announced that Lake was selected to play in the 1995 Pro Bowl as the Starting Strong Safety, to mark the first Pro Bowl selection of his career. He started in all 16 games in 1994 and recorded 68 combined tackles, three forced fumbles, one fumble recovery, a sack, and an interception.

==== 1995 ====
On February 15, 1995, the Pittsburgh Steelers chose to apply their franchise tag to Lake. August 15, 1995, the Pittsburgh Steelers signed Lake to a four-year, $9.20 million contract that includes a signing bonus of $2 million. Lake and Darren Perry returned as the starting safeties to begin the regular season.

In Week 6, he collected a season-high eight combined tackles during a 20–16 loss at the Jacksonville Jaguars. Lake was moved to cornerback and replaced Alvoid Mays after the Pittsburgh Steelers' defense allowed Bengals' quarterback Jeff Blake to throw three touchdown passes in a 27-9 loss on October 19. Head coach Bill Cowher moved Lake to cornerback for the remainder of the season as a replacement for Rod Woodson, who tore his ACL in the season-opener against the Detroit Lions. On December 15, 1995, it was announced that Lake was selected to the 1996 Pro Bowl as a safety. Lake started in all 16 games in 1995 and recorded 63 combined tackles, 1.5 sacks, one interception, a forced fumble, and fumble recovery. He started the last nine regular season games at cornerback.

The Pittsburgh Steelers finished first in the AFC Central with an 11–5 record and earned a first round bye. On January 6, 1996, Lake recorded five combined tackles and intercepted a pass by Bills' quarterback Jim Kelly during a 40–21 win against the Buffalo Bills in the AFC Divisional Round. The following week, the Pittsburgh Steelers defeated the Indianapolis Colts 20–16 in the AFC Championship Game. On January 28, 1996, Lake recorded five combined tackles as the Steelers lost 27–17 to the Dallas Cowboys in Super Bowl XXX.

==== 1996 ====
On December 13, 1996, it was announced that Lake was selected to play in the 1997 Pro Bowl, marking the third consecutive Pro Bowl selection or his career.

==== 1997 ====
In 1997, Lake was named AFC Defensive Player of the Year by the Kansas City Committee of 101. For the second time, Lake played the majority of the season at corner. He also received a vote for MVP from Sports Illustrated writer Peter King, which created a situation where Barry Sanders and Brett Favre tied for the award that season.

=== Jacksonville Jaguars ===
In 1999, Lake departed the Pittsburgh Steelers and joined the Jacksonville Jaguars in free agency. The Jaguars signed Lake to a four-year, $18 million contract which made him the highest paid safety in the league. Lake was moved to a new position as free safety, making the Pro Bowl for a fifth time. He was reunited with Jaguars' defensive coordinator Dom Capers, who had previously held the same position with the Pittsburgh Steelers.

On August 17, 2000, Lake underwent surgery on a recurring injury to his left foot and was expected to miss the entire 2000 NFL season. Lake elected to have a bone graft and had a piece of his hip bone grafted to his injured left foot. Lake had undergone a surgery on his foot in March due to a stress fracture in the navicular bone near his ankle. He underwent another surgery on the foot in May and returned to training camp in August.

On September 2, 2001, the Jaguars released Lake in a salary cap-related maneuver.

=== Baltimore Ravens ===
On September 11, 2001, the Baltimore Ravens signed Lake to a one-year, $477,000 contract at the veteran minimum. Lake was reunited Baltimore Ravens' defensive coordinator Marvin Lewis, who was a linebackers coach with the Pittsburgh Steelers from 1992 to 1995, and former teammates Rod Woodson and Leon Searcy.

== Coaching career ==
In summer 2009, Lake, along with former Steeler Greg Lloyd, was a coaching intern at the Philadelphia Eagles training camp at Lehigh University in Bethlehem, Pennsylvania.

In June 2010, Lake was hired by Jerry Simon to be the assistant coach of the Marina High School boys' basketball team.

On March 7, 2011, Lake was hired as the Pittsburgh Steelers defensive backs coach. He left that position as of February 7, 2018, to "return to California to be a part of his youngest son’s last year of high school football".

== NFL career statistics ==
Legend
**Bold**	Career high

=== Regular season ===
Year	Team	Games		Tackles				Interceptions					Fumbles			
Year	Team	GP	GS	Comb	Solo	Ast	Sck	Int	Yds	Avg	Lng	TD	FF	FR	Yds	TD
1989	PIT	15	15	70	—	—	1.0	1	0	0.0	0	0	2	**6**	2	0
1990	PIT	16	16	67	—	—	1.0	1	0	0.0	0	0	2	1	0	0
1991	PIT	16	16	83	—	—	1.0	0	0	0.0	0	0	0	0	0	0
1992	PIT	16	16	85	—	—	2.0	0	0	0.0	0	0	2	1	12	0
1993	PIT	14	14	**91**	—	—	5.0	**4**	31	7.8	26	0	1	2	0	0
1994	PIT	16	16	82	**68**	14	1.0	1	2	2.0	2	0	**3**	1	0	0
1995	PIT	16	16	73	63	10	1.5	1	32	32.0	32	**1**	1	1	0	0
1996	PIT	13	13	54	44	10	2.0	1	**47**	**47.0**	**47**	**1**	2	2	**85**	**1**
1997	PIT	16	16	60	43	**17**	**6.0**	3	16	5.3	11	0	2	1	38	**1**
1998	PIT	16	16	69	63	6	1.0	**4**	33	8.3	27	**1**	0	1	-2	0
1999	JAX	16	16	58	51	7	3.5	0	0	0.0	0	0	0	0	0	0
2000	JAX	Did not play due to injury														
2001	BAL	15	1	31	29	2	0.0	0	0	0.0	0	0	0	1	0	0
Career		185	171	823	361	66	25.0	16	161	10.1	47	3	15	17	135	2

== Personal life ==
Lake grew up primarily in Southern California. Lake did, however, live in the San Francisco Bay Area for three years (1979–1981) and attended Bowditch Middle School in Foster City, California. There he also played Pop Warner Football where he was a stand-out tailback and cornerback for those two years.

Lake attended Culver City High School, where he played varsity football for three years. He started on both sides of the ball as running back and linebacker. He also attended elementary school in Culver City prior to his move to San Francisco.

He and his wife, Monica, have three children. Lake and his family live in Irvine, California. Lake is a member of Alpha Phi Alpha, an African American Greek-letter fraternity. His son, Quentin, plays safety for the Los Angeles Rams.

== See also ==
- 2009 UCLA Bruins football team
