= 1994 Pro Bowl =

National Football League all-star game

1994 NFL Pro Bowl
| NFC | AFC |
|---|---|
| 17 | 3 |
| Head coach: George Seifert (San Francisco 49ers) | Head coach: Marty Schottenheimer (Kansas City Chiefs) |
| | 1 | 2 | 3 | 4 | Total |
|---|---|---|---|---|---|
| NFC | 3 | 0 | 7 | 7 | 17 |
| AFC | 0 | 3 | 0 | 0 | 3 |
- Date: February 6, 1994
- Stadium: Aloha Stadium; Honolulu, Hawaii
- MVP: Andre Rison (Atlanta Falcons)
- Referee: Gordon McCarter
- Attendance: 50,026

TV in the United States
- Network: ESPN
- Announcers: Mike Patrick and Joe Theismann

The 1994 Pro Bowl was the NFL's all-star game for the 1993 season. The game was played on February 6, 1994, at Aloha Stadium in Honolulu, Hawaii. The final Score was NFC 17, AFC 3. Andre Rison of the Atlanta Falcons was the game's MVP. This was also Joe Montana's last Pro Bowl appearance (coincidentally, the coaches for this game were from both teams that Montana played for in his career: Kansas City's Marty Schottenheimer and San Francisco's George Seifert). The referee was Gordon McCarter.

The game was tied 3-3 at halftime on field goals by Norm Johnson of the Atlanta Falcons and Gary Anderson of the Pittsburgh Steelers. The NFC scored late in the 3rd quarter on a 4-yard touchdown run by Los Angeles Ram rookie, Jerome Bettis. The NFC scored again in the 4th quarter on a touchdown pass from Bobby Hebert (Falcons) to Cris Carter (Minnesota Vikings) to provide the final margin.

Emmitt Smith, Troy Aikman, Thomas Everett, Bruce Smith and Andre Reed were selected for the 1994 Pro Bowl, but backed out due to injuries from Super Bowl XXVIII.

== AFC roster ==
=== Offense ===
| Position: | Starters: | Reserves: |
|---|---|---|
| Quarterback | 7 John Elway, Denver | 1 Warren Moon, Houston; 7 Boomer Esiason, N.Y. Jets; 19 Joe Montana, Kansas City |
| Running back | 34 Thurman Thomas, Buffalo | 32 Marcus Allen, Kansas City; 29 Barry Foster, Pittsburgh; 42 Chris Warren, Seattle |
| Fullback | 41 Keith Byars, Miami | |
| Wide receiver | 81 Tim Brown, L.A. Raiders; 83 Anthony Miller, San Diego | 83 Andre Reed, Buffalo; 84 Haywood Jeffires, Houston; 89 Webster Slaughter, Houston; 80 Irving Fryar, Miami |
| Tight end | 84 Shannon Sharpe, Denver | 86 Eric Green, Pittsburgh |
| Offensive tackle | 75 Howard Ballard, Buffalo; 78 Richmond Webb, Miami | 76 John Alt, Kansas City |
| Offensive guard | 63 Mike Munchak, Houston; 76 Steve Wisniewski, L.A. Raiders | 69 Keith Sims, Miami; 65 Max Montoya, L.A. Raiders |
| Center | 63 Dermontti Dawson, Pittsburgh | 74 Bruce Matthews, Houston |

=== Defense ===
| Position: | Starters: | Reserves: |
|---|---|---|
| Defensive end | 78 Bruce Smith, Buffalo; 90 Neil Smith, Kansas City | 96 Sean Jones, Houston; 75 Howie Long, L.A. Raiders; 91 Leslie O'Neal, San Diego |
| Defensive tackle | 79 Ray Childress, Houston; 96 Cortez Kennedy, Seattle | 92 Michael Dean Perry, Cleveland |
| Outside linebacker | 58 Derrick Thomas, Kansas City; 95 Greg Lloyd, Pittsburgh | 97 Cornelius Bennett, Buffalo |
| Inside linebacker | 55 Junior Seau, San Diego | 77 Karl Mecklenburg, Denver |
| Cornerback | 37 Nate Odomes, Buffalo; 26 Rod Woodson, Pittsburgh | 36 Terry McDaniel, L.A. Raiders |
| Free safety | 41 Eugene Robinson, Seattle | 27 Steve Atwater, Denver |
| Strong safety | 49 Dennis Smith, Denver | |

=== Special teams ===
| Position: | Player: |
|---|---|
| Punter | 9 Greg Montgomery, Houston |
| Placekicker | 1 Gary Anderson, Pittsburgh |
| Kick returner | 21 Eric Metcalf, Cleveland |
| Special teamer | 89 Steve Tasker, Buffalo |

== NFC roster ==
=== Offense ===
| Position: | Starters: | Reserves: |
|---|---|---|
| Quarterback | 8 Steve Young, San Francisco | 3 Bobby Hebert, Atlanta; 8 Troy Aikman, Dallas; 4 Brett Favre, Green Bay; 11 Phil Simms, N.Y. Giants |
| Running back | 22 Emmitt Smith, Dallas | 20 Barry Sanders, Detroit; 36 Jerome Bettis, L.A. Rams; 27 Rodney Hampton, N.Y. Giants; 32 Ricky Watters, San Francisco |
| Fullback | 48 Daryl Johnston, Dallas | |
| Wide receiver | 84 Sterling Sharpe, Green Bay; 80 Jerry Rice, San Francisco | 80 Andre Rison, Atlanta; 88 Michael Irvin, Dallas; 80 Cris Carter, Minnesota |
| Tight end | 84 Brent Jones, San Francisco | 84 Jay Novacek, Dallas |
| Offensive tackle | 79 Erik Williams, Dallas; 79 Harris Barton, San Francisco | 75 Lomas Brown, Detroit; 76 Jumbo Elliot, N.Y. Giants |
| Offensive guard | 61 Nate Newton, Dallas; 64 Randall McDaniel, Minnesota | 62 Guy McIntyre, San Francisco |
| Center | 53 Mark Stepnoski, Dallas | 61 Jesse Sapolu, San Francisco; 65 Bart Oates, N.Y. Giants |

=== Defense ===
| Position: | Starters: | Reserves: |
|---|---|---|
| Defensive end | 92 Reggie White, Green Bay; 56 Chris Doleman, Minnesota | 95 Richard Dent, Chicago |
| Defensive tackle | 93 John Randle, Minnesota; 90 Sean Gilbert, L.A. Rams | 67 Russell Maryland, Dallas |
| Outside linebacker | 57 Rickey Jackson, New Orleans; 59 Seth Joyner, Philadelphia | 56 Pat Swilling, Detroit; 97 Renaldo Turnbull, New Orleans |
| Inside linebacker | 56 Hardy Nickerson, Tampa Bay | 51 Ken Norton, Jr., Dallas |
| Cornerback | 24 Deion Sanders, Atlanta; 21 Eric Allen, Philadelphia | 21 Donnell Woolford, Chicago |
| Free safety | 20 Mark Carrier, Chicago | 27 Thomas Everett, Dallas |
| Strong safety | 35 LeRoy Butler, Green Bay | 46 Tim McDonald, San Francisco |

=== Special teams ===
| Position: | Player: |
|---|---|
| Punter | 5 Rich Camarillo, Arizona |
| Placekicker | 9 Norm Johnson, Atlanta |
| Kick returner | 33 Tyrone Hughes, New Orleans |
| Special teamer | 37 Elbert Shelley, Atlanta |
