= Dick LeBeau =

American football player and coach (born 1937)

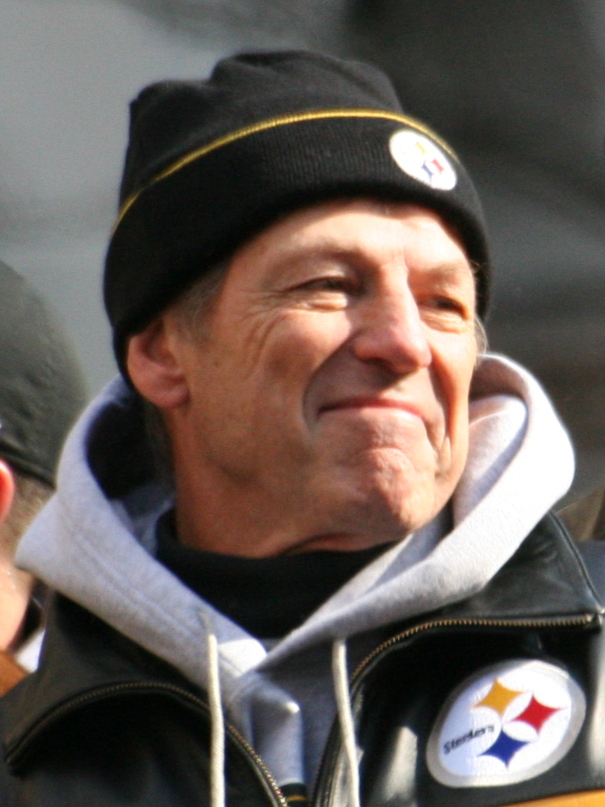
- LeBeau during Super Bowl XLIII parade in 2009

Personal information
- Born: September 9, 1937 (age 89); London, Ohio, U.S.
- Listed height: 6 ft 1 in (1.85 m)
- Listed weight: 185 lb (84 kg)

Career information
- Position: Cornerback (No. 24, 44)
- High school: London
- College: Ohio State (1956–1958)
- NFL draft: 1959: 5th round, 58th overall pick

Career history

Playing
- Cleveland Browns (1959)*; Detroit Lions (1959–1972)
- * Offseason or practice squad member only

Coaching
- Philadelphia Eagles (1973–1975) Special teams coach; Green Bay Packers (1976–1979) Defensive backs coach; Cincinnati Bengals (1980–1991); Defensive backs coach (1980–1983); Defensive coordinator (1984–1991); Pittsburgh Steelers (1992–1996); Defensive backs coach (1992–1994); Defensive coordinator (1995–1996); Cincinnati Bengals (1997–2002); Assistant head coach & defensive coordinator (1997–2000); Head coach (2000–2002); Buffalo Bills (2003) Assistant head coach; Pittsburgh Steelers (2004–2014) Defensive coordinator; Tennessee Titans (2015–2017) Assistant head coach & defensive coordinator

Awards and highlights
- As player: 4× Second-team All-Pro (1964–1966, 1970); 3× Pro Bowl (1964–1966); Pride of the Lions; Detroit Lions 75th Anniversary Team; Detroit Lions All-Time Team; National champion (1957); As coach: 2× Super Bowl champion (XL, XLIII); Sporting News Coordinator of the Year (2008); Pittsburgh Steelers Hall of Honor; Pittsburgh Pro Football Hall of Fame

Career NFL statistics
- Interceptions: 62
- Touchdowns: 4
- Stats at Pro Football Reference
- Coaching profile at Pro Football Reference
- Pro Football Hall of Fame

Charles Richard LeBeau (/ləˈboʊ/ lə-BOH; born September 9, 1937) is an American former professional football player and coach in the National Football League (NFL). He was active at field level in the NFL for 59 consecutive seasons, 14 playing as a cornerback with the Detroit Lions and 45 as a coach. LeBeau spent the majority of his coaching career as a defensive assistant, most notably as the defensive coordinator of the Cincinnati Bengals and Pittsburgh Steelers. Described as an "innovator" and "defensive football genius", he is considered to be one of the greatest defensive coordinators of all time.

LeBeau began his NFL playing career with the Lions in 1959, receiving three Pro Bowl and four second-team All-Pro selections. Upon retiring as a player in 1972, LeBeau began his coaching career the following season as the special teams coach of the Philadelphia Eagles and landed his first defensive role as the Green Bay Packers' defensive backs coach in 1976. He joined the Bengals in 1980, where he spent 19 non-consecutive years, including 12 years as defensive coordinator. During his first stint as Cincinnati's defensive coordinator, LeBeau popularized the "zone blitz", which helped the Bengals make two Super Bowl appearances in Super Bowl XVI and Super Bowl XXIII. He also served as the Bengals' head coach from 2000 to 2002, his sole head coaching position.

In between his two stints with Cincinnati, LeBeau began a defensive assistant tenure for the Steelers in 1992 and rejoined them in 2004 after one season as the Buffalo Bills' assistant head coach. His time in Pittsburgh spanned 16 non-consecutive years, holding the position of defensive coordinator for 13 years. LeBeau helped the Steelers make four Super Bowl appearances as their defensive coordinator, winning Super Bowl XL and Super Bowl XLIII during his second stint. After leaving the Steelers for the second time in 2014, LeBeau served as the defensive coordinator and assistant head coach of the Tennessee Titans until 2017. He was inducted to the Pro Football Hall of Fame as a player in 2010.

== Playing career ==
=== College ===
LeBeau attended Ohio State University playing for famed coach Woody Hayes and was on the 1957 national championship team, playing as a halfback on offense and a cornerback on defense. Also in 1957, playing both sides of the ball, he scored two touchdowns as Ohio State came back to beat Michigan 31–14.

=== NFL ===
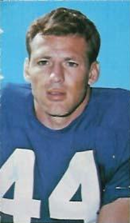
1969 Glendale Stamp of LeBeau for Detroit Lions

LeBeau was selected in the fifth round in 1959 by the Cleveland Browns but was cut in training camp. A few months later, he was signed by the Detroit Lions. He played 14 seasons in Detroit and was teamed with Hall of Famers Dick "Night Train" Lane, Yale Lary, and Lem Barney as part of a Detroit secondary that was one of the most feared in the NFL. Johnny Unitas always had respect for him, stating, "Dick is a good corner. I am just glad Night Train Lane is gone.

LeBeau is widely considered to be one of the greatest defensive backs in Lions history. He recorded 62 interceptions for 762 yards and four touchdowns. LeBeau's 62 interceptions are still a Lions franchise record, and he is tied for tenth all-time in NFL history while his 762 interception return yards rank third all-time in team history.

LeBeau was also one of the most durable players in the league. In 14 seasons, he played 185 games, placing him fourth on Detroit's all-time list. LeBeau is third all-time for most seasons played (14) and previously held the NFL record for consecutive appearances by a cornerback with 171, which has since been broken by Ronde Barber. LeBeau also recovered nine fumbles, returning them for 53 yards and a touchdown.

During his career, LeBeau was named to three consecutive Pro Bowls (1964–1966). In 1970, he established a career-high nine interceptions (tied for sixth on the team's all-time single-season interceptions list). LeBeau was a major defensive contributor to the Lions finishing with a 10–4 record that season. The Lions finished second in the NFC Central and earned a berth in the playoffs.

In 2010, LeBeau was voted into the Pro Football Hall of Fame along with running back Floyd Little. That same year, LeBeau was honored by the Lions and inducted into the Pride of the Lions.

== Coaching career ==
=== Early jobs ===
After retirement as a player, LeBeau immediately went into coaching with the Philadelphia Eagles as a special teams coach under coach Mike McCormack, spending three seasons in Philadelphia. In 1976, LeBeau coached the secondary for the Green Bay Packers under Pro Football Hall of Fame QB Bart Starr. In his first season, Willie Buchanon, Johnnie Gray, Steve Luke, and Perry Smith combined for 10 interceptions. In 1977, Mike C. McCoy replaced Smith, and that quartet combined for 11 interceptions. In 1979, Estus Hood replaced Buchanan, and the secondary combined for another 11 interceptions.

=== Cincinnati Bengals ===
In 1980, LeBeau became the Cincinnati Bengals' secondary coach; in that season, his starting secondary intercepted seven passes.

In 1981, Cincinnati had an outstanding defense that had not given up more than 30 points in any of their regular season or playoff games. Their line was anchored by defensive ends Ross Browner and Eddie Edwards, who were effective at stopping the run. Cincinnati's defense was also led by defensive backs Louis Breeden and Ken Riley and linebackers Bo Harris, Jim LeClair, and Reggie Williams, who intercepted four passes and recovered three fumbles. The Bengals intercepted 19 passes for 318 yards and also recorded 41 total sacks. The Bengals played in their first AFC Championship Game, defeating San Diego 27–7, limiting the Chargers' offense to only 7 points. In Super Bowl XVI, the Bengals trailed 20–0 at halftime and lost to San Francisco, 26–21.

In 1984, LeBeau was promoted to be the Bengals' defensive coordinator. His defenses rarely allowed more than 30 points in a game to an opponent. In 1984, his first season as defensive coordinator, the Bengals dropped from the top-ranked defense in 1983 (when they were coordinated by Hank Bullough) to 13th, allowing 339 points all season. In 1985, they dropped from 13th to 22nd. In 1986, points allowed were cut to 394 and the team finished with the 20th-ranked defense in the NFL. In 1987, they cut the points allowed to 370.

In 1988, the Bengals defense ranked 17th in the league, allowing 5,556 yards and 329 points during the regular season. Cincinnati had a superb defensive line, led by pro bowl defensive tackle Tim Krumrie, along with linemen Jim Skow (9 1/2 sacks), David Grant (five sacks), and Jason Buck (six sacks). Pro Bowl defensive backs Eric Thomas and David Fulcher combined for 12 interceptions. The team won the AFC Central Division with a 12–4 record but lost Super Bowl XXIII to the San Francisco 49ers for the second time in franchise history. The following season, 1989, the Bengals defense was 15th in the NFL, an improvement of two spots and was in the top half of NFL defenses due to LeBeau's scheme. In 1990 and 1991 the Bengals' defense ranked 25th and 28th respectively, out of 28 teams, and the team made a change in defensive coordinators.

=== Pittsburgh Steelers ===
LeBeau was hired by the Pittsburgh Steelers in 1992 as the secondary coach. In 1994, four defensive players were called to play in the 1995 Pro Bowl (Kevin Greene, Carnell Lake, Greg Lloyd and Rod Woodson). As a secondary coach LeBeau strongly influenced Lake and Woodson.

In 1995, LeBeau was promoted to be the defensive coordinator and the 1995 Pittsburgh defense ranked third in the league in total yards allowed after they had finished as the second-ranked defense in 1994 in that same category, so the drop off was minimal with LeBeau at the helm. They did allow 327 points in 1995 as opposed to 234 the year before when the Steelers defense was coordinated by Dom Capers, but they got to the Super Bowl in 1995 with a much-improved offense. Pro Bowl linebacker Kevin Greene led the team in sacks with nine, while Pro Bowl linebacker Greg Lloyd led the team in tackles with 86. The secondary was led by Pro Bowl defensive backs Carnell Lake and Hall of Famer Rod Woodson. The Steelers lost to the Dallas Cowboys in Super Bowl XXX, making it the third Super Bowl loss for him.

=== Cincinnati Bengals (second stint) ===
In 1997, LeBeau returned to the Bengals as defensive coordinator. The defense was ranked 25th in 1996, and in his first year back they dropped to 28th and allowed just over 400 points. In 1998 they remained 28th in the NFL (of 30 teams) and allowed 452 points. In 1999 the zone blitz scheme began to take hold and although the Bengals defense allowed 460 points, they improved to 25th in the NFL (out of 31 teams).

==== Head coach ====
LeBeau was named interim head coach for the Bengals in 2000 following head coach Bruce Coslet's resignation during the 2000 season. Following the season, he was named permanent head coach.

Despite LeBeau's considerable defensive coaching talent, his offenses were not nearly as successful as head coach, and his teams finished 4–9, 6–10, and 2–14, respectively, in his three seasons. LeBeau's overall record as a head coach was 12–33. He was fired after the 2002 season.

=== Buffalo Bills ===
Shortly after being fired by the Bengals, LeBeau was hired by the Buffalo Bills to be their assistant head coach.

=== Pittsburgh Steelers (second stint) ===
LeBeau returned to the Steelers in 2004 as their defensive coordinator. He was the Steelers defensive coordinator until 2014. During this time frame, LeBeau helped lead the Steelers to three Super Bowl appearances, winning two. He was named "Coordinator of the year" by the Sporting News for the 2008 season. On January 10, 2015, LeBeau resigned as defensive coordinator of the Steelers.

=== Tennessee Titans ===
A month after resigning from the Steelers, LeBeau was hired as the assistant head coach and defensive coordinator of the Tennessee Titans.

On January 20, 2016, LeBeau was officially named assistant head coach/defensive coordinator of the Titans after the departure of Ray Horton to the Cleveland Browns. Said LeBeau, "I like Tennessee a lot. I really love being here." On January 22, 2018, it was reported that LeBeau was considering retirement after not being retained after head coach Mike Mularkey and the Tennessee Titans agreed to part ways and Houston Texans defensive coordinator Mike Vrabel was hired as the new head coach. Although LeBeau was open to returning to the Titans under Vrabel, the Titans decided to not invite him to be part of their new coaching staff.

=== Legacy, defensive strategy ===
Dick LeBeau is arguably the best ever to coach defense. … He has done it on such a consistent basis over a long period of time.

— Ron Jaworski, ESPN analyst and former NFL quarterback.

It was a thought process kind of born out of necessity. It was basically an outcropping of the run-and-shoot [offense] that was becoming pretty prevalent in the league back then. We were in the same division as Houston, and they were tremendous at it with Moon and Co. Then the West Coast offense was spreading throughout the league. Those were all quick-rhythm, get-the-ball-out-of-your-hands-and-cut-up-the-defense types of passing games. We were just looking for ways to get pressure without exposing our defensive backs to have to cover the whole field all of the time.

— Dick LeBeau, on the origin of the 'zone blitz'.

As an assistant coach, LeBeau is credited with inventing the "Fire Zone" or "zone blitz" defense, which employs unpredictable pass rushes and pass coverage from various players. His defenses typically employ 3–4 sets, with any of the four linebackers (and frequently a defensive back) among the pass rushers, while defensive linemen may drop back into short pass coverage zones to compensate for the pass rush coming from other positions. The design is intended to confuse the opposition's quarterback and frustrate its blocking schemes. Since zone blitzes don't identify any of the prospective rushers, the offense may be unsure on each play of which defenders will rush the passer and which will drop into coverage. While often described as a "blitzing" scheme (implying more than the typical number of four pass-rushers used by most defenses), the call on any particular "zone blitz" play may involve only three or four pass rushers but from unpredictable positions and angles.

LeBeau is beloved among his players, many of whom refer to him as "Coach Dad." Steelers players have given LeBeau many gifts, including a Rolex watch.

=== Head coaching record ===
| Team | Year | Regular season | | | | | Postseason | | | |
| Team | Year | Won | Lost | Ties | Win % | Finish | Won | Lost | Win % | Result |
|---|---|---|---|---|---|---|---|---|---|---|
| CIN | 2000* | 4 | 9 | 0 | .308 | 5th in AFC Central | - | - | - | - |
| CIN | 2001 | 6 | 10 | 0 | .375 | 6th in AFC Central | - | - | - | - |
| CIN | 2002 | 2 | 14 | 0 | .125 | 4th in AFC North | - | - | - | - |
| Total | | 12 | 33 | 0 | .267 | | 0 | 0 | .000 | |

*Interim head coach

== Personal life ==
LeBeau has four children with his first wife, Phyllis Geer LeBeau, who died from cancer in 2002: Richard Jr., Linda, Lori, and Fe. LeBeau has been married to his current wife, Nancy, since 1973 and they have a son named Brandon together.

LeBeau acted in the 1970 film Too Late the Hero, where he played Michael Caine's double in a scene. LeBeau is said to regularly recite A Visit from St. Nicholas by heart to his players every Christmas season. LeBeau credits his London High School coach, Jim Bowlus, with influencing him to take up coaching after his playing years ended. LeBeau says seeing the effect that Coach Bowlus had on him and his teammates clinched it for him at that point.

LeBeau attended the American Legion Ohio Buckeye Boys State program in 1954 as a delegate. On June 10, 2019, he was inducted into the Buckeye Boys State Hall of Fame.
