= Eric Green (tight end) =

American football player (born 1967)

No. 86
- Position: Tight end

Personal information
- Born: June 22, 1967 (age 59); Savannah, Georgia, U.S.
- Listed height: 6 ft 5 in (1.96 m)
- Listed weight: 279 lb (127 kg)

Career information
- High school: Alfred E. Beach (Savannah, Georgia)
- College: Liberty (1985–1989)
- NFL draft: 1990: 1st round, 21st overall pick

Career history
- Pittsburgh Steelers (1990–1994); Miami Dolphins (1995); Baltimore Ravens (1996–1998); New York Jets (1999)

Awards and highlights
- 2× Pro Bowl (1993, 1994); PFWA NFL All-Rookie Team (1990); Liberty Flames No. 86 retired

Career NFL statistics
- Receptions: 362
- Receiving yards: 4,390
- Receiving touchdowns: 36
- Stats at Pro Football Reference

Bernard Eric Green (born June 22, 1967) is an American former professional football player who was a tight end in the National Football League (NFL). He was selected by the Pittsburgh Steelers in the first round (21st overall) of the 1990 NFL draft. Green was a two-time Pro Bowl selection for the Steelers in 1993 and 1994.

== Professional career ==
Pre-draft measurables
Height	Weight	Arm length	Hand span	40-yard dash	10-yard split	20-yard split	Bench press
6 ft 4 1/2 in (1.94 m)	274 lb (124 kg)	31 3/4 in (0.81 m)	9 3/4 in (0.25 m)	4.84 s	1.70 s	2.77 s	12 reps
All values from NFL Combine

Green played in 10 NFL seasons from 1990 to 1999 for the Steelers, the Miami Dolphins, the Baltimore Ravens, and the New York Jets.

=== Pittsburgh Steelers ===
Green was drafted in the first round with the 21st overall pick by the Pittsburgh Steelers in the NFL Draft. He initially held out for 54 days, causing him to miss training camp, preseason, and the opening game of the 1990 NFL season. Initially Green had threatened to sit out the entire season, which would have made him eligible for the 1991 NFL Draft. It took a call from Liberty head coach Sam Rutigliano to the Steelers front office to tell them to keep pursuing Green and that a deal could be made. Green signed the day after the season opening game, but did not play until week five. When Green did return to the Steelers lineup, his impact was immediately noticed. The Steelers offense did not score a touchdown until Green returned to the lineup. When he returned, he caught five of Bubby Brister's seven touchdown passes. With Green's return being noticed, defensive line coach Joe Greene commented, "Without Eric Green, we might not have scored a touchdown last year.". Green's versatility was shown in his rookie season by having him play several different positions, including wide receiver, slotback, wingback, H-back, and even running back.

On November 9, 1992, Green received a six-game suspension for violating the National Football League's drug policy. The league did not say which part of the policy that Green violated, but did confirm that it was not for steroids. At the time of the suspension, players who tested positive for steroids received a six-game suspension. Although the league would not confirm, this was the second time Green had violated the drug policy. A player receives treatment and counseling for a first offense and no announcement is made.

After a Pro Bowl season in 1993 season where Green achieved career highs in receptions (63), yards (942), and yards per reception (15.0), Green chose to hold out at the beginning of the 1994 season. "I want to be compensated for what I've done, but the Steelers weren't prepared to do that," said the 290-pound Green, the NFL's biggest tight end. With the ultimatum of either signing with the Steelers or miss the opening weekend game against the Dallas Cowboys, Green signed a one-year, $1.4 million contract on September 1, 1994. Green had rejected the Steelers earlier offer of a $10 million contract and took the lower offer to ensure his right to free agency after the season. After back to back Pro Bowl seasons with the Steelers, Green became an unrestricted free agent at the end of the 1994 NFL season.

=== Miami Dolphins ===
On March 11, 1995, Green signed a six-year, $12 million contract with the Miami Dolphins. At the time of the signing, Green's contract made him the highest paid tight end in NFL history. Green had also visited with the Raiders prior to signing with the Dolphins, but they did not make him an offer.

On July 9, 1996, Green was released from the Miami Dolphins. His weight problems and work ethic caused then-coach Jimmy Johnson to release Green from the team, which terminated his six-year, $12 million contract. Green attempted to collect his $1.5 million salary by going to arbitration. He said that his knee injury was caused by jogging with the team at mini-camp, while the Dolphins said it occurred while jogging at home.

=== Baltimore Ravens ===
Green worked out with the Ravens in late September 1996 and later announced that he and former Steelers teammate Bam Morris each signed two-year contracts with the team.

=== New York Jets ===
Green finished his NFL career with the New York Jets. Of the 10 games that he played with the Jets organization, he started 7 games and caught 7 passes for 37 yards.

=== NFL statistics ===
Year	Team	Games	Receptions	Yards	Yards per Reception	Longest Reception	Touchdowns	First Downs	Fumbles	Fumbles Lost
1990	PIT	13	34	387	11.4	46	7	0	0	0
1991	PIT	11	41	582	14.2	49	6	29	0	0
1992	PIT	7	14	152	10.9	24	2	10	0	0
1993	PIT	16	63	942	15.0	71	5	46	3	2
1994	PIT	15	46	618	13.4	46	4	31	2	2
1995	MIA	14	43	499	11.6	31	3	26	0	0
1996	BAL	6	15	150	10.0	23	1	9	0	0
1997	BAL	16	65	601	9.2	37	5	30	1	1
1998	BAL	12	34	422	12.4	56	1	21	4	3
1999	NYJ	10	7	37	5.3	10	2	3	0	0
Career		120	362	4,390	12.1	71	36	205	10	8

== Personal life ==
Once retired from the NFL, Green settled down in Florida with his wife and two children. He has three sons, and four daughters.

Green's son, Elijah, was drafted 5th overall by the Washington Nationals in the 2022 Major League Baseball draft.
