= Neil O'Donnell =

American football player (born 1966)

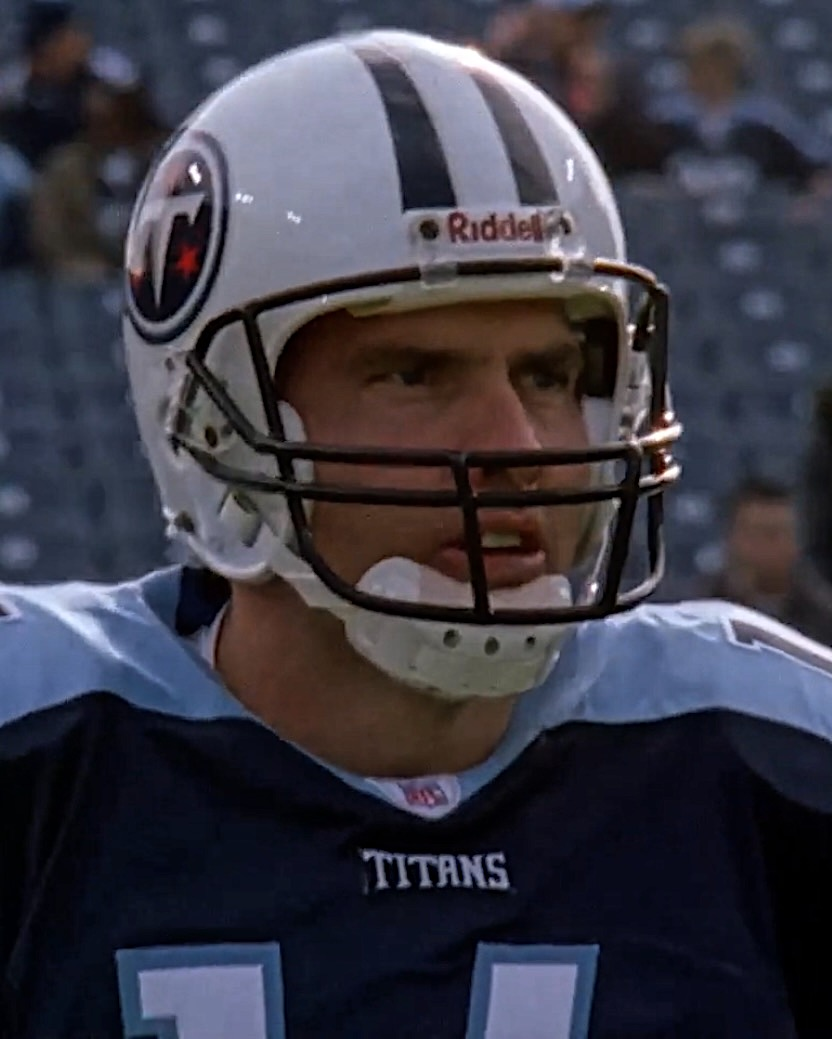
- O’Donnell with the Tennessee Titans

No. 14, 12
- Position: Quarterback

Personal information
- Born: July 3, 1966 (age 60); Morristown, New Jersey, U.S.
- Listed height: 6 ft 3 in (1.91 m)
- Listed weight: 228 lb (103 kg)

Career information
- High school: Madison (Madison, New Jersey)
- College: Maryland (1986–1989)
- NFL draft: 1990: 3rd round, 70th overall pick

Career history
- Pittsburgh Steelers (1990–1995); New York Jets (1996–1997); Cincinnati Bengals (1998); Tennessee Titans (1999–2003)

Awards and highlights
- Pro Bowl (1992)

Career NFL statistics
- Passing attempts: 3,229
- Passing completions: 1,865
- Completion percentage: 57.8%
- TD–INT: 120–68
- Passing yards: 21,690
- Passer rating: 81.8
- Stats at Pro Football Reference

Neil Kennedy O'Donnell (born July 3, 1966) is an American former professional football quarterback who played in the National Football League (NFL) for 14 seasons. He played college football for the Maryland Terrapins and was selected by the Pittsburgh Steelers in the third round of the 1990 NFL draft. During his six seasons with the Steelers, O'Donnell received Pro Bowl honors and helped lead them to an appearance in Super Bowl XXX. After leaving Pittsburgh, he was a member of the New York Jets for two seasons and the Cincinnati Bengals for one. O'Donnell spent his last five seasons as Steve McNair's backup on the Tennessee Titans, seeing playing time in relief of an injured McNair with the team that would appear in Super Bowl XXXIV.

== Early life ==
Neil Kennedy O'Donnell was born on July 3, 1966, in Morristown, New Jersey, and grew up in Madison, New Jersey, where he played high school football at Madison High School. His four older brothers played for local coaching legend Ted Monica and won state championships. Stephen O’Donnell was an All-State quarterback who went on to play for Duke. Coach Monica had retired by the time Neil enrolled at Madison High School, but mentored him throughout much of his young football life. O'Donnell was the star of the Dodgers varsity team as a sophomore and junior, but the team won just three games in those two seasons. During his senior year as quarterback, O'Donnell led the team to a respectable 4–2–3 season in 1985. Coach Bobby Ross recruited him to the University of Maryland despite lacking the stats and honors of other high school stars.

== College career ==
At the University of Maryland, College Park, O'Donnell redshirted the 1986 season, then played for the Terrapins for three seasons and was the starting quarterback in the 1988 and 1989 seasons. He played under head coach Joe Krivak, who was promoted from quarterback coach after Bobby Ross left the program in 1986. The Krivak era was marked by mediocre results and the O'Donnell years featured an especially tough out-of-conference schedule. The Terps finished 5–6 in 1988 and 3–7–1 in 1989, notably tying Penn State, only the second time Maryland had avoided losing to the Nittany Lions in the series up to that point. The Terps failed to reach a bowl game during O'Donnell's career there. He was backed up by QB Scott Zolak, who pushed O'Donnell for playing time during both of his seasons as a starter. O'Donnell wore #14 for the Terps and for most of his Pro Career. He was awarded the Ray Krouse Award for Maryland team MVP in 1989, and finished his Maryland career with 26 touchdown passes, 3 rushing touchdowns, and 5,069 total yards.

== Professional career ==
Pre-draft measurables
Height	Weight	Arm length	Hand span	40-yard dash	10-yard split	20-yard split	20-yard shuttle	Vertical jump
6 ft 2 1/4 in (1.89 m)	217 lb (98 kg)	31 1/4 in (0.79 m)	9 1/8 in (0.23 m)	4.89 s	1.63 s	2.89 s	4.03 s	32.5 in (0.83 m)
All values from NFL Combine

=== Pittsburgh Steelers ===
==== 1990–1991 ====
O'Donnell was selected by the Pittsburgh Steelers with the 70th overall pick in the 1990 NFL draft.

As a rookie, he sat behind incumbent starter Bubby Brister and did not see the field once. In 1991, he was once again named the team’s backup quarterback. He would relieve Brister for one drive during Week 1’s 26–20 victory over the San Diego Chargers. O’Donnell completed one pass on four attempts. His first ever NFL completion was an 89 yard touchdown pass to Dwight Stone. On October 14, he relieved an injured Brister once again. In his first NFL start, O’Donnell completed 11 passes on 21 attempts for 152 yards and two touchdowns as the Steelers lost to the New York Giants 23–20. He continued to start sporadically in place of Brister due to poor play. O’Donnell finished 1991 with a completion percentage of 54.5 (156-of-286) for 1,963 yards, 11 touchdowns, and seven interceptions. He started in eight regular season games and helped lead the Steelers to a 7–9 record, missing the playoffs.

==== 1992 ====
As the Steelers began the 1992 season, Steelers head coach Chuck Noll retired with Bill Cowher stepping into the role. Cowher preferred O’Donnell to Brister, promoting him to the starting quarterback position.

In a 23–6 victory over the San Diego Chargers, O’Donnell would have one of his statistically best games of his career. O’Donnell scored three touchdowns, two passing and one rushing, completed 17 of 24 passes for 215 yards and only committed one turnover. He finished the season throwing for 2,283 passing yards, 13 touchdowns, and 9 interceptions as he led the Steelers to an 11–5 record and took the AFC Central division title, but lost to the Buffalo Bills 24–3 in a divisional playoff game. At the conclusion of the season, O’Donnell was named to the Pro Bowl, the only one of his career.

==== 1993–1994 ====
In 1993, he finished the season with a passer rating of 79.4, throwing for a career-high 3,208 passing yards, 14 touchdowns, and 7 interceptions finishing with a 1.4 interception percentage, the second lowest in his career. In a Week 3 blowout victory over the division rival Cincinnati Bengals, O'Donnell completed 21-of-25 passes for 189 yards and three touchdowns to lead the Steelers to a final score of 34–7. O'Donnell followed up this season by throwing for 2,443 yards, 13 touchdowns, and nine interceptions as he led his team to a playoff berth yet again. He and the Steelers defeated the Cleveland Browns with a final score of 29–9 in which he threw 16-of-23 pass attempts for 186 yards and two touchdowns. The Steelers would lose the AFC Championship to the San Diego Chargers 17–13. He only completed 59.3% of his passes (32-of-54) for 349 yards (a career high), and one touchdown.

==== 1995: Super Bowl XXX ====
On September 3, 1995, O'Donnell led the Steelers to a Week 1 win over the Detroit Lions, throwing seven completions on 10 attempts for 63 yards, but failed to score a touchdown. During the game, O'Donnell was injured and replaced by backup Mike Tomczak. O'Donnell would not make a regular season appearance until the 20–16 loss to the expansion team Jacksonville Jaguars on October 8. He threw his first touchdown of the season during the game on an 18 yard pass to running back Steve Avery. He had his statistically best game of the season on November 19, 1995 as the Steelers defeated the Cincinnati Bengals 49–31. O'Donnell threw for 377 yards, completed 24-of-31 passes, and threw three touchdowns in what would be his fourth game of the season throwing for multiple touchdowns. The Steelers finished the regular season with a record of 11–5 and clinched the AFC Central yet again earning a first-round bye for the team for the fifth consecutive season.

In the divisional playoff round, O'Donnell led the Steelers to a victory over the Buffalo Bills by a final score of 40–21. In the game, O'Donnell threw a touchdown pass to have the Steelers take a 14–0 lead to begin the second quarter. On January 14, O'Donnell won his first AFC Championship 20–16 over the Indianapolis Colts. O'Donnell threw a five yard touchdown pass to Kordell Stewart in his only score of the game.

The Steelers would make their fifth franchise Super Bowl appearance in Super Bowl XXX on January 28, 1996 against the Dallas Cowboys. During the game, he threw one touchdown on a six yard pass to Yancey Thigpen and completed 28-of-49 passes. Infamously, O'Donnell threw two nearly identical interceptions to Larry Brown (with one apparently due to a missed route by Andre Hastings) that set up short touchdown drives in the second half. He tacked on a third interception as well late in the game. These interceptions proved costly for the Steelers as it led to them losing 27–17.

O'Donnell was not re-signed to the team following his Super Bowl performance, making him a free agent at the end of the season.

=== New York Jets ===
==== 1996 ====
On February 29, 1996, he signed a 5-year, $25 million contract with the New York Jets that was both more money than Pittsburgh and also close to his home in Madison, New Jersey.

O’Donnell was named the Jets’ starting quarterback going into the 1996 season. His first outing with the team was a far cry from his tenure with the Steelers, throwing just seven completions of 13 attempts for 50 yards and an interception. His passer rating of 30.9 was a career low for O’Donnell as the Jets lost to the Denver Broncos 31–6.

Through his first six starts of the season, O’Donnell led the Jets to an 0–6 record and only completed 110-of-188 passes for 1,147 yards, four touchdowns, and seven interceptions. He was also sacked 18 times for 127 yards. He suffered a season ending shoulder injury during a 34–13 loss to the Oakland Raiders.

==== 1997 ====
His performance improved the following season under new head coach Bill Parcells. He led the Jets to a Week 1 victory over the Seattle Seahawks in which he completed 18-of-25 passes for 270 yards and five touchdowns. In contrast with the previous season’s opener, his passer rating of 146.7 was a career high for O’Donnell.

He eventually fell out of favor with Parcells and lost his starting job to Glenn Foley. O'Donnell refused to re-negotiate his contract, which paid him $6.65 million for the upcoming season, Parcells chose to waive O'Donnell. He stated later that he had no regrets, stating, "It was exciting, but the change was hard, I'll be honest with you. I mean the locker room change, the environment change. We were at Hofstra [University on Long Island], which was horrible. I never thought it would affect me, but every game was an away game. That's how it felt. It was a constant battle even to get to a so-called home game at Giants Stadium."

=== Cincinnati Bengals ===
On July 7, 1998, O'Donnell signed a 4-year, $17 million contract with the Cincinnati Bengals. In the 1998 NFL season, with the then 1–3 Bengals, O'Donnell threw a 25-yard touchdown pass to Carl Pickens with 20 seconds remaining to score the winning touchdown against 3–1 Pittsburgh. O'Donnell's 90.2 passer rating was sixth among regular starting quarterbacks in the NFL and third in the AFC. However, due to a struggling defense, the Bengals went on to finish 3–13. O'Donnell was released at the end of the season to make room for rookie quarterback Akili Smith.

=== Tennessee Titans ===
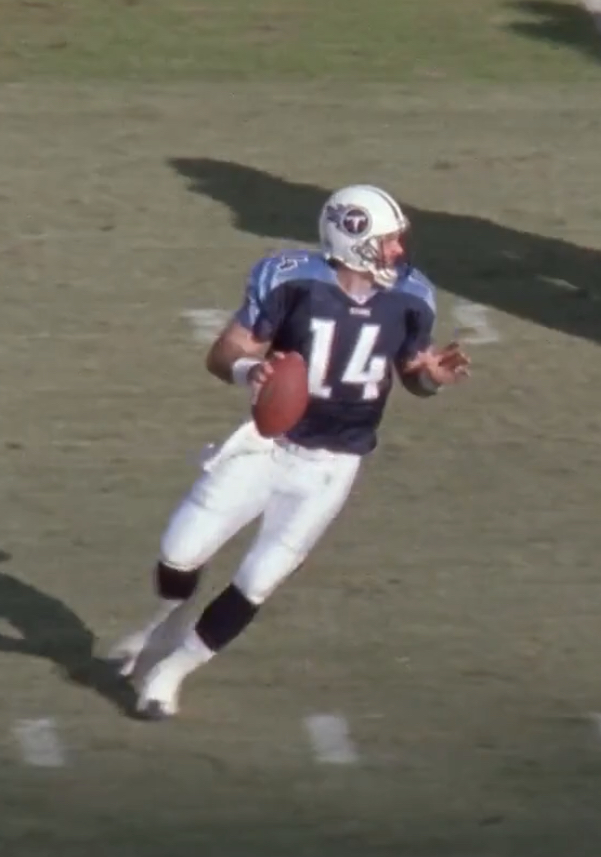
O’Donnell in 2003

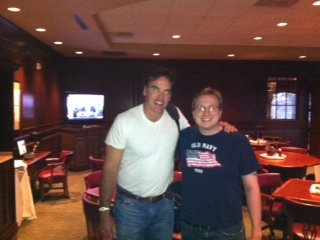
O’Donnell with a fan in 2011

On July 24, 1999, O'Donnell signed a multi-year contract with the Tennessee Titans, where he served as Steve McNair's backup. He performed well, winning four of his five starts for an injured McNair in 1999, leaving a perennial .500 team at 5–1 upon McNair's return. Later, O'Donnell came off the bench and led Tennessee to a 47–36 victory over Pittsburgh in Week 17 en route to the AFC Championship and Super Bowl XXXIV, in which he was not an active participant.

O'Donnell retired after the 2002 season, but was talked into coming back for one game in December 2003 when McNair and Billy Volek were injured. He started in the regular season finale and delivered a strong performance, completing 18 of 27 passes for 232 yards and two touchdowns, leading the Titans to a 33–13 victory over the Tampa Bay Buccaneers.

O'Donnell ended his career with the lowest interception percentage in NFL history, averaging just 2.11 interceptions for every 100 pass attempts. Aaron Rodgers and Jacoby Brissett have since eclipsed the record (both 1.4 interception percentage through the 2024-25 season). O'Donnell also wore number 14 during most of his career except during his one-year stint with the Bengals, where he wore number 12. The Bengals did not issue number 14 after the retirement of former quarterback and West Coast offense pioneer Ken Anderson in 1986 until Andy Dalton started wearing number 14 for the Bengals in 2011.

== NFL career statistics ==
Legend
	Pro Bowl selection
	Led the league
**Bold**	Career high

Year	Team	Games			Passing								
Year	Team	GP	GS	Record	Cmp	Att	Pct	Yds	Avg	TD	Int	Lng	Rtg
1991	PIT	12	8	2–6	156	286	54.5	1,963	6.9	11	7	**89**	78.8
1992	PIT	12	12	9–3	185	313	59.1	2,283	7.3	13	**9**	51	83.6
1993	PIT	**16**	**15**	9–6	**270**	**486**	55.6	**3,208**	6.6	14	7	71	79.5
1994	PIT	14	14	**10–4**	212	370	57.3	2,443	6.6	13	**9**	60	78.9
1995	PIT	12	12	9–3	246	416	59.1	2,970	7.1	**17**	7	71	87.7
1996	NYJ	6	6	0–6	110	188	58.5	1,147	6.1	4	7	78	67.8
1997	NYJ	15	14	8–6	259	460	56.3	2,796	6.1	**17**	7	70	80.3
1998	CIN	13	11	2–9	212	343	61.8	2,216	6.5	15	4	76	90.2
1999	TEN	8	5	4–1	116	195	59.5	1,382	7.1	10	5	54	87.6
2000	TEN	7	1	1–0	36	64	56.3	530	8.3	2	3	67	74.3
2001	TEN	5	1	0–1	42	76	55.3	496	6.5	2	2	35	73.1
2002	TEN	4	0	—	3	5	60.0	24	4.8	0	0	15	72.1
2003	TEN	1	1	1–0	18	27	**66.7**	232	**8.6**	2	1	34	**102.7**
Career		125	100	55–45	1,865	3,229	57.8	21,690	6.7	120	68	89	81.8

== Post-football career ==
O'Donnell permanently retired after the 2003 season. In 2004, he declined two different offers to return to the NFL with the New York Giants and the Pittsburgh Steelers, with the latter being when starting quarterback Charlie Batch had sustained injury.

O'Donnell found work as a sports analyst, primarily covering the Titans at WTVF, Nashville's CBS affiliate (2005–2007). He is currently a sales representative for FieldTurf in Kentucky and Tennessee.
