= Ricky Sutton =

American football player (born 1971)

No. 96, 98
- Position: Defensive end

Personal information
- Born: April 27, 1971 (age 55); Atlanta, Georgia, U.S.
- Listed height: 6 ft 2 in (1.88 m)
- Listed weight: 281 lb (127 kg)

Career information
- High school: Tucker (Tucker, Georgia)
- College: Auburn (1989–1992)
- NFL draft: 1993: undrafted

Career history
- Pittsburgh Steelers (1993–1994); Jacksonville Jaguars (1995)*; Barcelona Dragons (1996)
- * Offseason or practice squad member only

Career NFL statistics
- Games played: 8
- Stats at Pro Football Reference

Frederick "Ricky" DeWayne Sutton (born April 27, 1971) is an American former professional football defensive end who played for the Pittsburgh Steelers of the National Football League (NFL). He played college football for the Auburn Tigers. Sutton also had stints with the Jacksonville Jaguars and the Barcelona Dragons of the World League of American Football (WLAF).

== Early life ==
Sutton was born on April 27, 1971, in Atlanta, Georgia. He attended Tucker High School in Tucker, Georgia.

== College career ==
Sutton played college football for the Auburn Tigers from 1989 to 1992 and was a four-year letterman. He played in the 1993 Senior Bowl.

== Professional career ==
=== Pittsburgh Steelers ===
After going undrafted in the 1993 NFL draft, Sutton signed with the Pittsburgh Steelers as an undrafted free agent. He played in eight games as a backup his rookie season, including the Wild Card game against the Kansas City Chiefs. Sutton signed a contract extension before the 1994 season but was released by the team on August 22, 1994.

=== Jacksonville Jaguars ===
On December 15, 1994, Sutton was signed by the Jacksonville Jaguars as one of the original ten signings by the new franchise. On May 4, 1995, he was waived by the team.

=== Barcelona Dragons ===
In 1996, Sutton played for the Barcelona Dragons of the World League of American Football (WLAF). He had 12 tackles and two sacks.
