= Fred Foggie =

American football player (born 1969)

No. 36
- Position: Defensive back

Personal information
- Born: June 10, 1969 (age 57); Waterloo, South Carolina
- Listed height: 6 ft 0 in (1.83 m)
- Listed weight: 200 lb (91 kg)

Career information
- High school: Laurens (SC) District 55
- College: Minnesota

Career history
- Denver Broncos (1991)*; Birmingham Fire (1992); Atlanta Falcons (1992)*; Cleveland Browns (1992); Pittsburgh Steelers (1993–1994); Carolina Panthers (1995)*; Frankfurt Galaxy (1996)
- * Offseason or practice squad member only
- Stats at Pro Football Reference

Fred Foggie (born June 10, 1969) is an American former football defensive back. He played for the Cleveland Browns in 1992 and for the Pittsburgh Steelers in 1994.
