= Gerald Williams (American football) =

American football player (born 1963)

No. 98, 96
- Position: Defensive tackle

Personal information
- Born: September 8, 1963 (age 63); Waycross, Georgia, U.S.
- Listed height: 6 ft 3 in (1.91 m)
- Listed weight: 290 lb (132 kg)

Career information
- College: Auburn
- NFL draft: 1986: 2nd round, 36th overall pick

Career history
- Pittsburgh Steelers (1986–1994); Carolina Panthers (1995–1997); Green Bay Packers (1997)

Awards and highlights
- First-team All-SEC (1985)

Career NFL statistics
- Tackles: 396
- Sacks: 25.5
- Forced fumbles: 5
- Stats at Pro Football Reference

Gerald Williams (born September 8, 1963) is an American former professional football player who was a defensive lineman in the National Football League (NFL) for the Pittsburgh Steelers, Carolina Panthers, and the Green Bay Packers. He (Gerald Williams (American football)) played college football for the Auburn Tigers, earning All-SEC honors in 1986. He was selected 36th overall in the second round of the 1986 NFL draft. He also spent several years as a college and pro scout for the Panthers. Williams spent the 2009 season as tight ends coach for the Division II Catawba Indians located in Salisbury, NC.
