= Charles Davenport (American football) =

American football player (born 1968)

No. 80
- Position: Wide receiver

Personal information
- Born: November 22, 1968 (age 57); Fayetteville, North Carolina, U.S.
- Listed height: 6 ft 3 in (1.91 m)
- Listed weight: 210 lb (95 kg)

Career information
- High school: Pine Forest (Fayetteville)
- College: NC State
- NFL draft: 1992: 4th round, 94th overall pick
- Expansion draft: 1995: 19th round, 37th overall pick

Career history
- Pittsburgh Steelers (1992–1994); Jacksonville Jaguars (1995)*
- * Offseason or practice squad member only

Awards and highlights
- First-team All-ACC (1991)

Career NFL statistics
- Receptions: 13
- Receiving yards: 187
- Total touchdowns: 1
- Stats at Pro Football Reference

Charles Davenport (born November 22, 1968) is an American former professional football player who was a wide receiver in the National Football League (NFL) for the Pittsburgh Steelers. He played college football for the NC State Wolfpack and was selected by the Steelers in the fourth round of the 1992 NFL draft with the 94th overall pick.
