= Kevin Henry =

American football player (born 1968)

No. 76
- Position: Defensive end

Personal information
- Born: October 23, 1968 (age 58); Mound Bayou, Mississippi, U.S.
- Listed height: 6 ft 4 in (1.93 m)
- Listed weight: 282 lb (128 kg)

Career information
- High school: John F. Kennedy (Mound Bayou)
- College: Mississippi State
- NFL draft: 1993: 4th round, 108th overall pick

Career history
- Pittsburgh Steelers (1993–2000); Cincinnati Bengals (2001)*
- * Offseason or practice squad member only

Career NFL statistics
- Tackles: 235
- Sacks: 14
- Fumble recoveries: 5
- Stats at Pro Football Reference

Kevin Lerell Henry (KEY-vin; born October 23, 1968) is an American former professional football player who was a defensive lineman for eight seasons in the National Football League (NFL) for the Pittsburgh Steelers. He played college football for the Mississippi State Bulldogs.

Henry was born in 1968 in Mound Bayou, Mississippi, where he attended John F. Kennedy Memorial High School. He then enrolled at Mississippi State University. He redshirted during his first year at the school and was ineligible as a sophomore after his American College Test (ACT) score was invalidated. He first saw game action as a junior and led the team with six quarterback sacks. As a senior, he started seven games, but then sustained a tear in the posterior cruciate ligament of his left knee. Despite the injury, he finished the 1992 season with 66 tackles and three sacks against Alabama.

Henry was selected by the Pittsburgh Steelers in the fourth round (108th overall pick) of the 1993 NFL draft. He played at the defensive end position for the Steelers from 1993 to 2000, appearing in 116 NFL games, 81 of them as a starter. He tallied 74 tackles, eight tackles for loss, two interceptions, 14 sacks, and five recovered fumbles in his NFL career. His interception (and 38-yard return) of a Drew Bledsoe pass in December 1997 was referred to as the "immaculate interception."

Henry is cousins with former professional wrestler Mark Henry.
