= Duval Love =

American football player and coach (born 1963)

No. 67
- Positions: Tackle, guard

Personal information
- Born: June 24, 1963 (age 63); Los Angeles, California, U.S.
- Listed height: 6 ft 3 in (1.91 m)
- Listed weight: 275 lb (125 kg)

Career information
- High school: Fountain Valley (Fountain Valley, California)
- College: UCLA
- NFL draft: 1985: 10th round, 274th overall pick

Career history

Playing
- Los Angeles Rams (1985–1991); Pittsburgh Steelers (1992–1994); Arizona Cardinals (1995–1996)

Coaching
- Whittier College (OL) (2007-2008)

Awards and highlights
- Pro Bowl (1994); Third-team All-American (1983); 2× First-team All-Pac-10 (1983, 1984)

Career NFL statistics
- Games played: 167
- Games started: 122
- Fumble recoveries: 7
- Stats at Pro Football Reference

Duval Love (born June 24, 1963) is an American former professional football player who was a guard in the National Football League (NFL).

Love was born in Los Angeles, California, and played prep football at Fountain Valley High School in Fountain Valley, California, where he was teammates and classmates with future NFL wide receiver Emile Harry. As a senior, Love earned All-Sunset League and All-CIF Southern Section Division I honors as an offensive lineman as he helped lead the Barons to the Big Five Conference championship game. He attended the University of California, Los Angeles, playing football for the Bruins. As a junior, he was named a third-team All-American by Football News after helping UCLA win its second straight Rose Bowl. For his senior season, Love was named first team All-Pac-10 for the second straight year and earned second-team All-American honors in 1984, ending his four-year collegiate career by leading the Bruins to victory in the Fiesta Bowl.

Love was selected by the Los Angeles Rams in the 10th round (274th overall) of the 1985 NFL draft. He was a backup in his first three seasons working under head coach John Robinson and renowned offensive line coach Hudson Houck and made his first professional starts in 1987 playing in relief of injured veteran All-Pro right guard Dennis Harrah. Following Harrah's retirement, Love inherited the starting role and started for most of the next four seasons for Los Angeles. In 1992, he signed as a free agent with the Pittsburgh Steelers and was a full time starter for new head coach Bill Cowher. Leaving Pittsburgh in 1995, Love continued as a starter with the Arizona Cardinals for the final two years of his 12-seasons NFL career.

He was an offensive line coach at Whittier College from 2007 to 2008.
