= Greg Lloyd =

American football player (born 1965)

No. 95
- Position: Linebacker

Personal information
- Born: May 26, 1965 (age 61); Miami, Florida, U.S.
- Listed height: 6 ft 2 in (1.88 m)
- Listed weight: 228 lb (103 kg)

Career information
- High school: Peach County (Fort Valley, Georgia)
- College: Fort Valley State
- NFL draft: 1987: 6th round, 150th overall pick

Career history
- Pittsburgh Steelers (1987–1997); Carolina Panthers (1998)

Awards and highlights
- 3× First-team All-Pro (1993–1995); 5× Pro Bowl (1991–1995); 3× NFL forced fumbles leader (1991, 1994, 1995); Pittsburgh Steelers All-Time Team; Pittsburgh Steelers Hall of Honor

Career NFL statistics
- Total tackles: 791
- Sacks: 54.5
- Forced fumbles: 38
- Fumble recoveries: 16
- Interceptions: 11
- Stats at Pro Football Reference

Gregory Lenard Lloyd Sr. (born May 26, 1965) is an American former professional football player who was a linebacker in the National Football League (NFL), primarily with the Pittsburgh Steelers. He was named to five Pro Bowls and three All-Pro teams.

== College career ==
Lloyd attended Fort Valley State University, where he was a three-time All-Southern Intercollegiate Athletic Conference (SIAC) selection, a three-time team Defensive MVP, and as a senior, he was the SIAC Player of the Year, and a first-team Sheridan All-American selection. He was also a member of Kappa Alpha Psi fraternity.

== Professional career ==
Lloyd did not receive an invitation to the NFL Scouting Combine, but did play in the Heritage Bowl. Pittsburgh Steelers' scouts viewed a videotape of Lloyd in the historically black college All-Star Game and were impressed by his ability to play sideline-to-sideline as he exhibited a bit of a mean streak. Steelers' scout, Tom Donahoe, flew to Atlanta and drove 2 1/2 hours to Fort Valley State to work out Lloyd and was further impressed.

The Pittsburgh Steelers selected Lloyd in the sixth round (150th overall) of the 1987 NFL draft. Lloyd was the 28th linebacker drafted in 1987 by then Steelers coach Chuck Noll.

On July 28, 1987, it was reported that Lloyd had suffered a sprained left knee in training camp, which sidelined him for his entire rookie season in 1987 and most of the 1988 season. He was a starter during the 1989 season as an outside linebacker and he excelled. He became the emotional and fiery leader of the Steelers defense after the retirement of inside linebacker David Little. Lloyd teamed with cornerback Rod Woodson.

=== Later career ===
Lloyd once again missed the entire 1996 season due to another knee injury. He then returned as a starter in the 1997 season but missed several games due to a staph infection. He was named to five Pro Bowls and three NFL All-Pro teams during this time. Lloyd left the Steelers in 1998 and played for the Carolina Panthers before retiring. A true leader and student of the game, Lloyd continued to impact the Steelers defense while injured from the sideline by teaching young linebackers Chad Brown and Jason Gildon the finer points of Steelers linebacking tradition.

In 2020, the Steelers inducted him into their Hall of Honor.

== NFL career statistics ==
Legend
	Led the league
**Bold**	Career high

=== Regular season ===
Year	Team	Games		Tackles				Interceptions			Fumbles	
Year	Team	GP	GS	Cmb	Solo	Ast	Sck	Int	Yds	TD	FF	FR
1988	PIT	9	4	33	–	–	0.5	0	0	0	2	1
1989	PIT	16	16	92	–	–	7.0	**3**	49	0	1	3
1990	PIT	15	14	62	–	–	4.5	1	9	0	1	0
1991	PIT	16	16	76	–	–	8.0	1	0	0	**7**	2
1992	PIT	16	16	96	–	–	6.5	1	35	0	5	**4**
1993	PIT	15	15	111	–	–	6.0	0	0	0	5	1
1994	PIT	15	15	87	69	18	**10.0**	1	8	0	6	1
1995	PIT	16	16	**116**	**88**	**28**	6.5	**3**	**85**	0	6	0
1996	PIT	1	1	2	2	0	1.0	0	0	0	0	0
1997	PIT	12	12	52	30	22	3.5	0	0	0	4	3
1998	CAR	16	14	64	48	16	1.0	1	3	0	1	1
Career		147	139	791	237	84	54.5	11	189	0	38	16

== Personal life ==
Lloyd was born in Miami, Florida, and was raised by his mother there until the age of two. In 1967, Lloyd's mother drove him and five of his eight siblings to Fort Valley, Georgia, and left them with his Aunt Bertha Mae. He has never met his father and was raised in a two-bedroom apartment along with nine other children. Lloyd grew up in poverty and had two outfits to wear throughout the week. He began playing football at the age of six and played fullback and linebacker in high school.

Lloyd has a black belt in Tae Kwon Do, which he currently teaches. He is also well known for using an expletive in a nationally televised interview with NBC's Jim Gray after Pittsburgh defeated the Indianapolis Colts in the 1995 AFC Championship.

In 2004, he pleaded no contest to battery after pointing a gun at his ex-wife in 2002.

Lloyd's son Greg Lloyd Jr. was a linebacker for the University of Connecticut football team, and wore #95 like his father.
