= Dermontti Dawson =

American football player (born 1965)

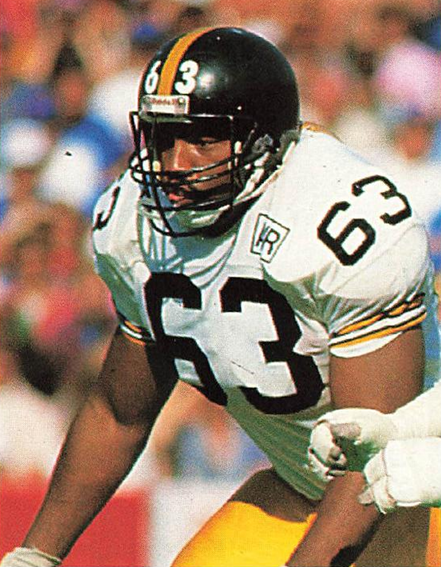

No. 63
- Positions: Center, long snapper

Personal information
- Born: June 17, 1965 (age 61); Lexington, Kentucky, U.S.
- Listed height: 6 ft 2 in (1.88 m)
- Listed weight: 288 lb (131 kg)

Career information
- High school: Bryan Station (Lexington)
- College: Kentucky
- NFL draft: 1988: 2nd round, 44th overall pick

Career history
- Pittsburgh Steelers (1988–2000)

Awards and highlights
- 6× First-team All-Pro (1993–1998); 7× Pro Bowl (1992–1998); NFL 1990s All-Decade Team; Pittsburgh Steelers All-Time Team; Pittsburgh Steelers Hall of Honor; Second-team All-SEC (1987)

Career NFL statistics
- Games played: 184
- Games started: 181
- Fumble recoveries: 1
- Stats at Pro Football Reference
- Pro Football Hall of Fame

Dermontti Farra Dawson (born June 17, 1965) is an American former professional football player who was a center and long snapper in the National Football League (NFL). He played college football with the Kentucky Wildcats. He was selected by the Pittsburgh Steelers in the second round of the 1988 NFL draft and spent his entire pro career with the team and was elected to the Pro Football Hall of Fame in 2012.

== Early life ==
Dawson was born in Lexington, Kentucky where he attended Bryan Station High School. He was a nationally ranked high school track and field performer in the discus and shot put.

After having a bad experience playing ninth grade football, Dawson chose not to go out for his high school team his sophomore year. He joined the football team as a junior after being recruited due to his size by the school's football coach. He was an all-state offensive tackle in high school and eventually accepted a football scholarship to attend the University of Kentucky. Among his high school teammates were future NFL players Marc Logan and Cornell Burbage.

== College career ==
Dawson played center and guard at Kentucky. He lettered in each of his four years. In his freshman year in 1984 the team defeated Wisconsin in the Hall of Fame Bowl. As a senior in 1987 Dawson was named second-team All-Southeastern Conference (SEC).

== Professional career ==
Pre-draft measurables
Height	Weight	Arm length	Hand span	40-yard dash	10-yard split	20-yard split	20-yard shuttle	Vertical jump	Broad jump	Bench press
6 ft 2 1/4 in (1.89 m)	272 lb (123 kg)	32 7/8 in (0.84 m)	9 7/8 in (0.25 m)	4.94 s	1.77 s	2.95 s	4.34 s	30.0 in (0.76 m)	9 ft 1 in (2.77 m)	24 reps
All values from NFL Combine

Dawson was selected 44th overall by the Pittsburgh Steelers in the second round of the 1988 NFL draft. In his rookie season he played guard alongside Hall of Fame center Mike Webster. When Webster left the team following that season, Dawson succeeded him as the starting center. He soon became one of the more respected players among the Steelers, and one of the best in the league at his position. He earned the name "Dirt" for the way he would try to grind defenders into the ground. In contrast, his friendly off-field demeanor led to a second nickname, Ned Flanders, after the annoyingly cheerful character from The Simpsons.

"To me he was the best athlete to ever play that position. He was very powerful and explosive, just a rare combination of quickness, explosion, and he was a very dependable player. This guy hardly ever missed a game. He redefined the position."

— former Steelers head coach Bill Cowher

Dawson was named to seven consecutive Pro Bowls from 1992 to 1998 and was a six-time AP First-team All-Pro. In 1993, he was named co-AFC Offensive Lineman of the Year by the NFLPA and in 1996 he was named the NFL Alumni's Offensive Lineman of the Year. He played in 170 consecutive games, the second-most in Steelers history, until severe hamstring injuries forced him to sit out nine games in 1999 and seven more games in 2000. Dawson was released by the Steelers following the 2000 season partly due to these injuries and partly due to salary cap reasons. He opted to retire rather than trying to play for another team.

"He was one of the best players that we have ever played against at that position. He had exceptional quickness; I think that really the measure of a center is his ability to play against powerful guys that are lined up over him and try to bull-rush the pocket and collapse it in the middle so that the quarterback can't step up. Dawson had great leverage and quickness with his hands and his feet where he did a great job of keeping that pocket clean for [Neil] O'Donnell and those guys who played behind him."

— New England Patriots head coach Bill Belichick in 2008. Belichick coached the Browns in the early 1990s.

He is the only player to have played in the two most lopsided games in the Browns–Steelers rivalry, getting his first career start at center in the Steelers' 51–0 loss to the Cleveland Browns at home (still the worst loss for the Steelers in franchise history), but was victorious in the Steelers 43–0 win against the Browns in Cleveland ten years later, in the Browns' first game in four years.

== Personal life ==
Dawson is divorced from Regina – who served as an elementary school principal at Shearer Elementary in nearby Winchester, Kentucky – and has two children. He returned to Lexington after his retirement, where he spent several years as a real estate developer. He filed for Chapter 7 bankruptcy protection in 2010 listing over $69 million in liabilities against just under $1.5 million in assets. He currently resides in San Diego, California, where he is a sales executive for a promotional products company.

Dawson served an internship in the Steelers scouting department in 2009 and served as an intern coach with the Cincinnati Bengals in 2010. He is also a part owner of the Washington Wild Things, an independent league baseball team in Washington, Pennsylvania.

== Legacy ==
Dawson was named the first-team center on the National Football League 1990s All-Decade Team. In 2007, he was selected for the Pittsburgh Steelers All-Time Team which was named as part of the franchise's 75th season celebration. The Steelers have not reissued Dawson's #63 Jersey since his retirement, though it has not been formally retired. His election to the Pro Football Hall of Fame in 2012 was preceded by three consecutive times of being a finalist listed for the honor.

In 2001 Dawson and his wife established the Dermontti F. and Regina M. Dawson Endowed Graduate Fellowship in Education scholarship at his alma mater, the University of Kentucky (UK). Dawson was appointed to the school's board of trustees by Kentucky governor Ernie Fletcher in 2005. He is a member of UK's College of Education's "Alumni Hall of Fame" and the UK Hall of Distinguished Alumni as well as a charter member of the UK Athletics Hall of Fame. In addition, his jersey has been retired by the school.
