= Max Starks =

American football player (born 1982)

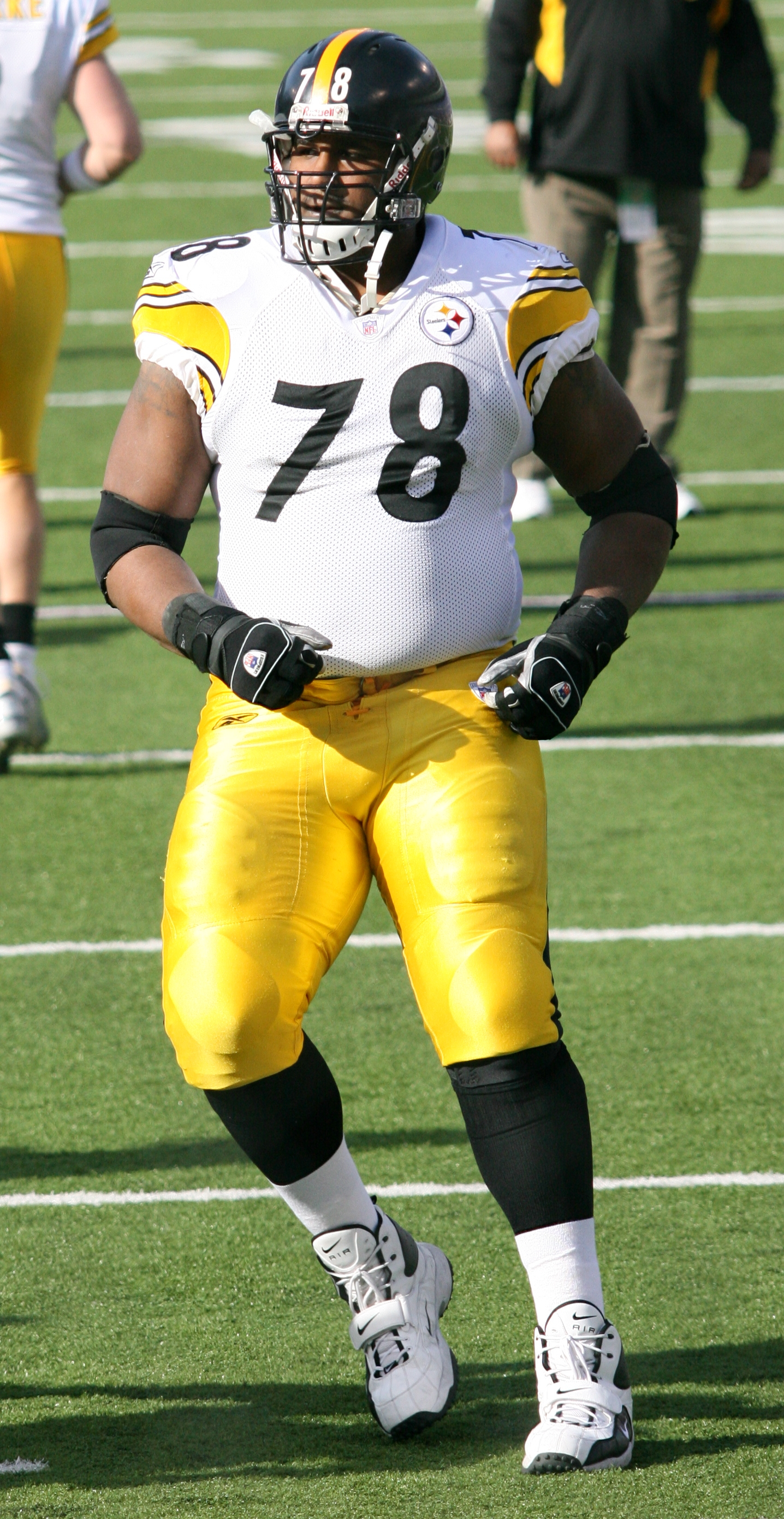
- Starks with the Pittsburgh Steelers in 2006

No. 78, 79
- Position: Offensive tackle

Personal information
- Born: January 10, 1982 (age 44); Orlando, Florida, U.S.
- Listed height: 6 ft 8 in (2.03 m)
- Listed weight: 345 lb (156 kg)

Career information
- High school: Lake Highland Preparatory School
- College: Florida
- NFL draft: 2004: 3rd round, 75th overall pick

Career history
- Pittsburgh Steelers (2004–2012); San Diego Chargers (2013)*; St. Louis Rams (2013); Arizona Cardinals (2014)*
- * Offseason or practice squad member only

Awards and highlights
- 2× Super Bowl champion (XL, XLIII); First-team All-SEC (2003)

Career NFL statistics
- Games played: 125
- Games started: 96
- Stats at Pro Football Reference

Maximillian Weisner Starks IV (born January 10, 1982) is an American former professional football player who was an offensive tackle for 10 seasons in the National Football League (NFL). He played college football for the Florida Gators. He was selected by the Pittsburgh Steelers in the third round of the 2004 NFL draft, and also played for the San Diego Chargers, St. Louis Rams, and Arizona Cardinals.

A longtime fan favorite among Steeler fans, Starks turned to broadcasting after he retired from playing and is currently the color commentator for the Pittsburgh Steelers Radio Network.

== Early life ==
Starks was born in Orlando, Florida. He attended Orlando Christian School for sixth to eighth graders, where he played basketball and volleyball for the OCS Knights. As an eighth grader he wore size 16 shoes; when he had a difficult time finding shoes that fit, he borrowed shoes from NBA star Shaquille O'Neal, who played at the time for the Orlando Magic; Starks was a ball boy for the Magic at that time. Starks attended Lake Highland Preparatory School, a private prep school in Orlando. He was one of the state's top offensive linemen in 1999, was named to Super Prep's, National Bluechips and Prep Star's high school All-America teams, and was a USA Today honorable mention All-American. He was a two-time all-conference selection in basketball.

== College career ==
Starks accepted an athletic scholarship to attend the University of Florida in Gainesville, Florida, where he played for coach Steve Spurrier and coach Ron Zook's Florida Gators football teams from 2000 to 2003. During his time as a Gator, he won a Southeastern Conference (SEC) championship ring (2000) and blocked for record-setting Gators quarterbacks Rex Grossman (2000–2002) and Chris Leak (2003). As a senior, Starks was a team captain and first-team All-SEC selection.

While he was a Florida undergraduate, Starks was a member of Alpha Phi Alpha fraternity. He graduated from the University of Florida with a bachelor's degree in sociology in 2007.

== Professional career ==
Pre-draft measurables
Height	Weight	Arm length	Hand span	40-yard dash	20-yard shuttle	Three-cone drill	Vertical jump	Broad jump	Bench press
6 ft 7 in (2.01 m)	350 lb (159 kg)	35 1/2 in (0.90 m)	10 3/4 in (0.27 m)	5.56 s	4.65 s	7.88 s	30.0 in (0.76 m)	8 ft 4 in (2.54 m)	21 reps
All values from NFL Combine/Pro Day

=== Pittsburgh Steelers ===
Starks was among the largest NFL players, standing at 6'8" and 370 pounds with size 19 shoes. Four other relatives of Starks have been professional football players. He was drafted in 2004, round three, pick 12, by the Steelers. He became a starter for the first time in the 2005 season for the eventual Super Bowl Champion Pittsburgh Steelers.

Entering the 2007 season, Starks lost his starting job to Willie Colon; however, he played in all 16 games. He also started 4 games at the end of the season at left tackle in place of the injured Marvel Smith. On February 21, 2008, the Pittsburgh Steelers placed the transition tag on Starks. He signed his one-year, $6.85-million tender offer on April 19. He signed another one-year contract with the Steelers following their victory in Super Bowl XLIII.

On June 23, 2009, the Steelers signed Starks to a new four-year, $26.3 million contract. The deal included $10 million in guarantees.

He was released by the Steelers on July 28, 2011, but was later re-signed on October 5, 2011. After the season, he worked on the rehabilitation of a knee injury and said he hoped to return to the Steelers for the 2012 season. In July 2012, he announced on Twitter that he had re-signed with the Steelers. Starks started all 16 Steelers games in 2012.

=== San Diego Chargers ===
Starks signed a one-year contract with the San Diego Chargers on May 21, 2013. He was released on August 30, 2013.

=== St. Louis Rams ===
On September 18, 2013, he signed a one-year contract with the St. Louis Rams; he was released on October 1, 2013.

=== Arizona Cardinals ===
On August 1, 2014, Starks signed with the Arizona Cardinals. He was released on August 25, 2014. He announced his retirement from professional football in January 2015.

== Broadcasting career ==
In 2021, Starks returned to the Steelers as the sideline reporter for the Pittsburgh Steelers Radio Network. His addition was part of a larger reshuffling, as he replaced fellow former Steelers offensive lineman Craig Wolfley, who moved to the booth alongside longtime play-by-play man Bill Hillgrove to replace former teammate Tunch Ilkin as color analyst following the latter's retirement and death due to complications from ALS. Starks works alongside Missi Matthews during games. Starks would also replace Ilkin as Wolfley's broadcast partner on Steelers Nation Radio for the team's in-season analysis show on WBGG. In 2025, following Wolfley's death due to cancer, Starks became the Steelers' official color commentator. Steelers play-by-play announcer Rob King replaced Wolfley for the team's in-season analysis show, In the Locker Room with King and Starks.

== Personal life ==
Starks is the son of former professional defensive lineman Ross Browner. Starks discovered he wasn't the biological son of Max Starks III, his stepfather, when he was in high school.

Ross Browner, who was a first-round selection in the 1978 NFL draft by the Cincinnati Bengals, started 36 of 43 games during his career. Browner was a two-time (1976, 1977) All-American defensive lineman at Notre Dame and won the Lombardi and Maxwell Awards. The Browner family as a whole is second to the Matthews family with regard to NFL players in the family. Ross's brothers Joey Browner, Jimmy Browner, and Keith Browner all played in the NFL. Starks's cousin, Keith Browner, Jr., played with the Houston Texans.

Starks appeared in Chunky Soup commercials eating soup with Steelers back-up quarterback Charlie Batch, defensive tackle Casey Hampton and others.

In 2006, he traveled with Seattle Seahawks defensive end Bryce Fisher and Atlanta Falcons defensive end Patrick Kerney on the USO Tour, traveling to United States military bases, a tradition begun by such NFL greats as Frank Gifford and Johnny Unitas. In 2005 Starks visited the USS Theodore Roosevelt at sea, along with members of the Cincinnati Bengals coaching staff.

Starks was heavily involved in the local community at the University of Florida. He served as a tutor in Gainesville, Florida and worked with Kids Against Drugs, Alcohol and Tobacco. Starks also became involved with the charity Cents of Relief which works to prevent human trafficking and allow access to healthcare for vulnerable populations, particularly women of prostitution and their children. He currently serves on the charity's board of directors.

== See also ==
- List of University of Florida alumni
- List of Florida Gators in the NFL draft
- List of Pittsburgh Steelers players
- List of Pittsburgh Steelers broadcasters
- List of Pittsburgh Steelers figures in broadcasting
