= List of Pittsburgh Steelers figures in broadcasting =

The Pittsburgh Steelers franchise has a rich history of producing well-known sportscasters over the years: the most famous of whom was Myron Cope, who served as a Steelers radio color commentator for 35 seasons (1970–2004).

Additionally, several former players for the Pittsburgh Steelers picked up the broadcast microphone:

- Lynn Swann (wide receiver, 1974–1982) - was a sideline reporter for ABC Sports from 1976–2006 including College Football on ABC and Monday Night Football. Swann has also had several Hollywood roles, making cameos in 1998's The Waterboy, 1993's The Program, and 1991's The Last Boy Scout. His TV cameos include Saturday Night Live and The Drew Carey Show.
- Merril Hoge (running back, 1987–1993) - currently co-hosts the Steelers' gameday preview show on Thursday nights from 7 PM to 8 PM eastern time on the Pittsburgh Steelers Radio Network, has hosted sports shows on ESPN and ESPN2 from 1996–2017, most notably NFL Matchup, Football Friday and NFL 2Night/ NFLLive. He has also had hosting duties on ABC/ESPN's Great Outdoor Games. He also served as an analyst for the Pittsburgh Steelers Radio Network alongside Bill Hillgrove and the late Myron Cope.
- Mark Malone (quarterback, 1980–1987) - began his career as a sports reporter for Pittsburgh's WPXI-TV from 1991–1994, from 1994 to 2004 he hosted nationally-televised sports shows for ESPN, including NFL 2Night, NFL Matchup and the X-Games. From 2004–2008, he was director of sports broadcasting at CBS2 Chicago. Hosted his own program weeknights from 7 PM – 10 PM on NBC Sports Radio from 2013–2020.
- Jerome Bettis (running back, 1996–2005) - formerly an analyst for NBC Sunday Night Football's Football Night in America pregame with Bob Costas 2006–2009, also is host of the Pittsburgh broadcast The Jerome Bettis Show 1998–2007 on KDKA-TV and 2007–present on WPXI-TV.
- Hines Ward (wide receiver, 1998–2011) - former analyst for NBC Sunday Night Football's Football Night in America. Pregame/halftime analyst for Notre Dame Football on NBC (2013–2015), sports analyst for CNN and HLN in 2016, and hosted The Hines Ward Show from 2006–2012 on KDKA-TV, 2013–2016 on WPXI-TV, and as a podcast in 2016.
- Bill Cowher (head coach, 1992–2006) - co-host of CBS Sports' NFL Today on CBS since 2007 as a studio analyst, joining Dan Marino, Shannon Sharpe, and Boomer Esiason. Cowher had a cameo in 1998's The Waterboy, and in 2007 Cowher appeared in the ABC reality television series Fast Cars and Superstars: The Gillette Young Guns Celebrity Race, featuring a dozen celebrities in a stock car racing competition. Cowher matched up against Gabrielle Reece and William Shatner. Cowher has also made a cameo in The Dark Knight Rises with several other Steelers players, as the coach of the Gotham Rogues.
- Terry Bradshaw (quarterback, 1970–1983) - started as a guest commentator for CBS NFL playoff broadcasts from 1980–1982, after retirement he joined Verne Lundquist at CBS full-time as a game analyst on what became one of the top rated sports broadcasts. In 1990, he went from the broadcast booth to the pregame studio shows, anchoring the NFL Today pregame shows on CBS from 1990–1993 and later on Fox NFL Sunday from 1994–present. In recent years, he has started to host regular features in addition to the show, "Ten yards with TB" and the "Terry Awards". In addition to broadcasting Bradshaw has had appearances in several major motion pictures (most notably Smokey and the Bandit II, Black Sunday, and Failure to Launch) as well as spokesman for Radio Shack and SaniKing among others in commercials. He also has made many guest appearances on sitcoms from Married... with Children to Evening Shade.
- Kordell Stewart (quarterback, 1995–2002) - former ESPN analyst for all NFL shows and analyst for TuneIn's NFL Coverage 2015–2018.
- Tunch Ilkin (offensive tackle, 1980–1992) - former Steelers radio color commentator 1998–2020; Pittsburgh CW Network and WBGG In the Locker Room Host 2006–2021.
- Craig Wolfley (offensive lineman, 1980–1989) - former Steelers radio sideline reporter 2002–2020 and radio color commentator 2021–2024; Pittsburgh CW Network and WBGG In the Locker Room Host 2006–2024.
- Rod Woodson (defensive back, 1987–1996), (1997 with 49ers), (1998–2001 with Ravens), and (2002–2023 with Raiders) - former analyst for NFL Network 2003–2011;, current color commentator for the Baltimore Ravens radio network since 2022.
- Jack Ham (linebacker, 1971–1982) - did color commentary for the Steelers on KDKA-TV during the NFL Preseason into the early 2000s before leaving and being replaced by former teammate Edmund Nelson. Ham also co-hosted some pregame and postgame shows on the station, but was replaced by Nelson in those roles as well. Since 2000, Ham has been the color analyst on the Penn State football radio network.
- Edmund Nelson (defensive lineman, 1982–1987) - served as the color analyst for Pittsburgh Steelers pre-season games and participated as a co-host to Bob Pompeani in KDKA-TV's regular season pregame program Steelers Kickoff until retiring in 2015.
- Charlie Batch (quarterback, 2002–2012) - current postgame show analyst for the Pittsburgh Steelers Radio Network; took a Steelers pregame studio analyst job with KDKA-TV for the 2013 season alongside KDKA-TV sports anchor Bob Pompeani and ex-Steeler defensive lineman Edmund Nelson, effectively ending his NFL career. He continued in this role for the 2014 season. In 2015, Batch replaced the retiring Nelson as KDKA-TV's color commentator for preseason games, while becoming the main studio analyst for the Steelers' pregame coverage before the national airing of The NFL Today. Former teammate Chris Hoke replaced Nelson for the post-game show.
- Tony Dungy (defensive back, 1977–1978) - analyst on NBC Sports's Football Night in America since 2009.
- Lowell Perry (end, safety, 1956, ends coach, 1957, scout, 1958) - former Steelers television color commentator for CBS Sports in 1966; first African-American NFL TV commentator
- Len Dawson (quarterback, 1957–1959) - former sports director and anchor for KMBC-TV in Kansas City from 1966 to 2009; former Kansas City Chiefs radio color commentator from 1982 to 2017; won Pete Rozelle Radio-Television Award in 2012
- Jeff Reed - (kicker, 2002–2010) - hosted the sports radio show Kickin' It with Jeff Reed from 2013 to 2014 on WZGV in Charlotte, North Carolina on Saturdays from 10 AM to 11 AM eastern time
- Arthur Moats (outside linebacker, 2014–2017) - co-hosts the Steelers podcast The Arthur Moats Experience with Pittsburgh podcaster Eric "Deke" Deklaven; co-hosts Steelers Blitz with Steelers radio pregame and halftime host Wes Uhler from 12 PM to 2 PM eastern time on Mondays and Wednesdays through Fridays during the NFL season on the Pittsburgh Steelers Radio Network
- Max Starks (offensive tackle, 2004–2012) - former Pittsburgh Steelers Radio Network sideline reporter 2021–2025, current Steelers radio color commentator since 2025; In the Locker Room with King and Starks co-host since 2021
- Ramon Foster (offensive guard, 2009–2019) - Tennessee Volunteers radio color commentator and Pittsburgh Steelers Radio Network preseason sideline reporter since 2025
- James Harrison (outside linebacker, 2002–2003, 2004–2012, 2014–2017) - analyst and guest star on Fox Sports since 2018, now co-hosts Deebo & Joe podcast with former Steelers teammate Joe Haden since 2025
- Ryan Clark (safety, 2006–2013) - ESPN NFL analyst on NFL Live, SportsCenter, Get Up!, and First Take since 2015; Inside the NFL host since 2023
- Ike Taylor (cornerback, 2003–2014) - NFL Network analyst from 2015 to 2017, previously hosted a radio show in Pittsburgh on the Pittsburgh Tribune-Review radio and podcast network while with the Steelers
- Bryant McFadden (cornerback, 2005–2011) - CBS Sports HQ NFL analyst since 2018, former host of The Hometowne Sports B-Mac Corner TV show on WPNT from 2006–2008 and his own weekly radio show on WPGP from 2011–2012; former analyst on the 2015 Southern Heritage Classic on Fox Sports South and 120 Sports from 2013–2017

== See also ==
- List of Pittsburgh Steelers broadcasters
