= Wolfley =

Wolfley is a surname. Notable people with the surname include:

- Craig Wolfley (1958–2025), American football player and color analyst
- Lewis Wolfley (1839–1910), American civil engineer and politician
- Max Wolfley, American politician
- Ron Wolfley (born 1962), American football player
