= Bill Hillgrove =

American sports broadcaster

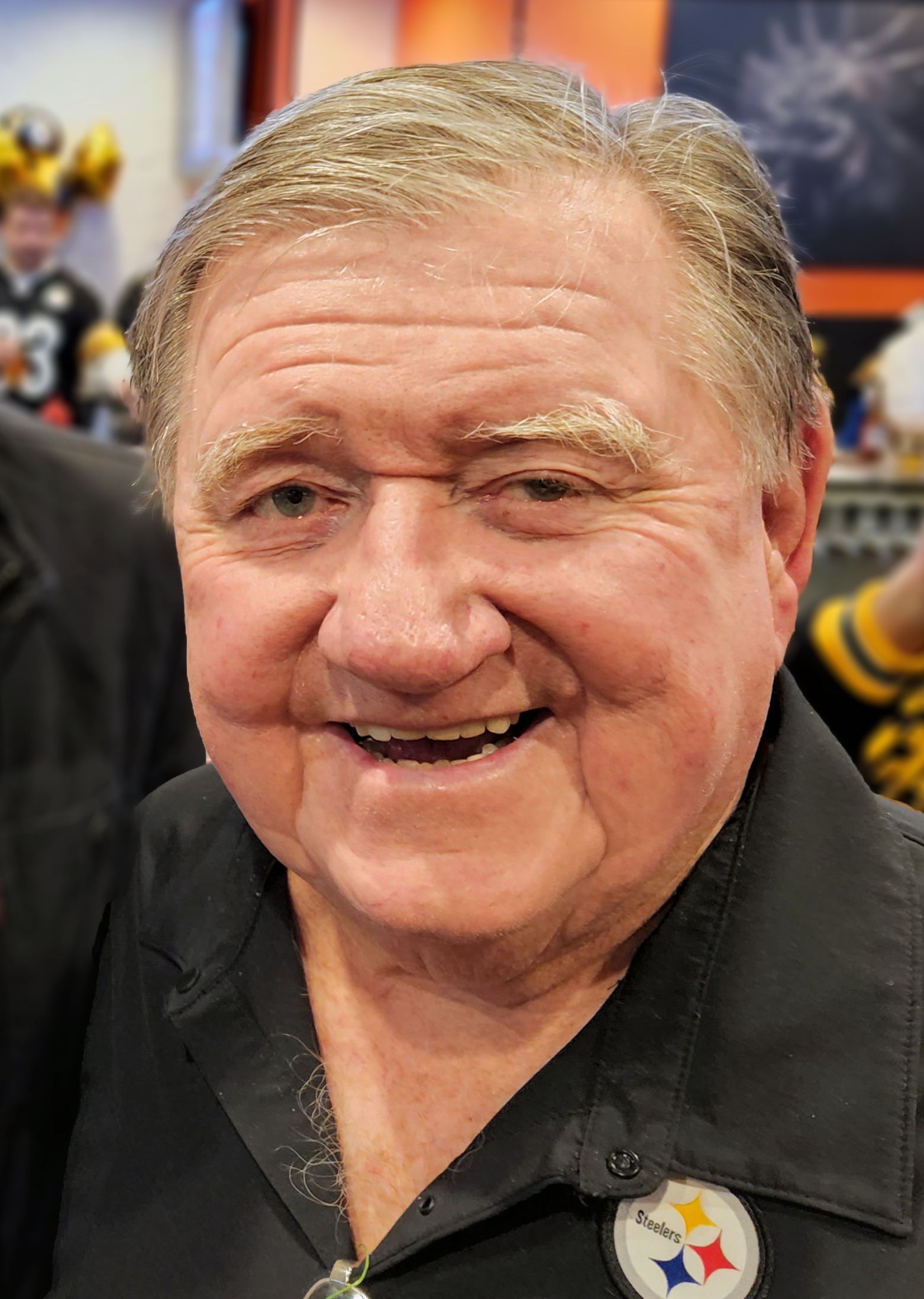
- Hillgrove in 2024
- Born: November 20, 1940 (age 85); Pittsburgh, Pennsylvania, U.S.
- Education: Duquesne University
- Years active: 1974–present
- Spouse: Rosette Sapienza (m. 1965)
- Children: 2
- Sports commentary career
- Teams: Pittsburgh Steelers, Pittsburgh Panthers (football, men's basketball)
- Genres: Play-by-play, color commentary
- Sports: American football, college football, college basketball

William Thomas Hillgrove (born November 20, 1940) is an American sports broadcaster, radio personality, and sports journalist.

Hillgrove is a notable broadcaster in his hometown of Pittsburgh, and has worked exclusively in that market. He served as the lead play-by-play broadcaster for the Pittsburgh Steelers football network (102.5 FM WDVE) from 1994 to 2024. He is also the lead broadcaster for the University of Pittsburgh sports network (93.7 FM The Fan), calling Pitt football games with former Pitt quarterback Pat Bostick and Pitt basketball games with former Pitt guard Curtis Aiken.

== Early life ==
Born William Thomas Hillgrove in Pittsburgh's Lawrenceville neighborhood, he grew up in nearby Garfield. He attended Central Catholic High School and Duquesne University. He worked as a student sports broadcaster for Duquesne basketball games while in college. Hillgrove graduated from Duquesne in 1962 with a degree in journalism.

== Career ==
=== Early career ===
Hillgrove's first job was as a disk jockey with WKJF (now KDKA-FM, known as "93.7 The Fan"), and in 1968, he joined WTAE-TV as the station's booth announcer. A year later, he swapped jobs with WTAE Radio announcer Del Taylor, wishing to get back into radio. In the mid-1960s, he served for a short period of time as "proprietor" (the name given to the host) of "The Place", a television show on WQED (Channel 13) that was a coffee-house style format.

In 1969, he was hired as a road game broadcaster for the Pitt Panthers basketball team. The following year, he became the regular color commentator for Pitt football alongside lead play-by-play announcer Ed Conway. Following Conway's death in 1974, Hillgrove assumed play-by-play announcer duties.

Hillgrove was named the sports director for WTAE-TV in 1978 and acted as sports anchor for WTAE News.

=== Pittsburgh Steelers ===
In 1994, Hillgrove was handpicked by Steelers owner Dan Rooney to succeed the retiring Jack Fleming as the play-by-play broadcaster for the Pittsburgh Steelers on the Pittsburgh Steelers Radio Network.

After working for many years alongside famous color broadcaster Myron Cope, his Steeler broadcast partners now include former Steelers players like Merrill Hoge (former color), Tunch Ilkin (former color), Craig Wolfley (color), and Max Starks (sideline).

As the Steelers' play-by-play announcer, Hillgrove has called the Steelers' most recent Super Bowl victories in Super Bowl XL and Super Bowl XLIII, with Ilkin as the color commentator and Wolfley as the sideline reporter.

=== Pittsburgh Panthers ===
Hillgrove has also been a commentator for Pitt football and basketball games. Former Pittsburgh Pirate Dick Groat (who had been an All-America guard at Duke in the early 1950s following schoolboy stardom in nearby Swissvale) served as Hillgrove's broadcast partner for basketball until the 2018–2019 season; former Pitt player Curtis Aiken is now his broadcast partner. His partners for football have been Johnny Sauer (1974–1982, 1984–1994), Myron Cope (1983), Bill Osborn (1995–2003, 2015–2017), Bill Fralic (2004–2010), and Pat Bostick (2010–2015, 2018–present).

== Awards and recognition ==
He was the 2007 winner of the Chris Schenkel Award, presented by the National Football Foundation, for his work as Pitt's football broadcaster.

In July 2012, Hillgrove began hosting a Saturday jazz program presented by the online Pittsburgh Jazz Channel.

== Personal life ==
Hillgrove married Rosette Sapienza, a vocal music teacher, in 1965. They live in Murrysville, Pennsylvania. The couple have two children and two grandchildren.

On June 19, 2020, Hillgrove was charged with driving under the influence for an incident four days earlier. Hillgrove drove a vehicle into the front of a Murrysville grocery store, breaking two windows, and then went inside to fill a prescription. He then returned to the car and drove home, where police later arrived and conducted a breathalyzer test. His blood alcohol content was found to be 0.16, twice the legal limit in Pennsylvania. Hillgrove told officers he "had a couple beers" and that the "car just got away from [him]". He subsequently received a two-game suspension from both Steelers and Pitt football broadcasts.

== See also ==
- List of Pittsburgh Steelers broadcasters
- List of Pittsburgh Steelers figures in broadcasting
