= Tunch Ilkin =

Turkish-American gridiron football player and sports broadcaster (1957–2021)

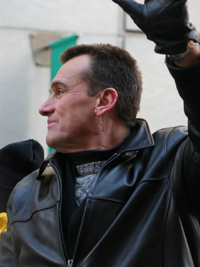
- Ilkin in 2009

No. 62, 79
- Position: Offensive tackle

Personal information
- Born: September 23, 1957; Istanbul, Turkey
- Died: September 4, 2021 (aged 63); Pittsburgh, Pennsylvania, U.S.
- Listed height: 6 ft 3 in (1.91 m)
- Listed weight: 263 lb (119 kg)

Career information
- High school: Highland Park (Highland Park, Illinois, U.S.)
- College: Indiana State
- NFL draft: 1980: 6th round, 165th overall pick

Career history
- Pittsburgh Steelers (1980–1992); Green Bay Packers (1993)

Awards and highlights
- 2× Pro Bowl (1988, 1989); Pittsburgh Steelers All-Time Team; Pittsburgh Steelers Hall of Honor

Career NFL statistics
- Games played: 177
- Games started: 143
- Fumble recoveries: 4
- Stats at Pro Football Reference

Tunch Ilkin (Turkish: Tunç Ali İlkin; September 23, 1957 – September 4, 2021) was a Turkish-American professional football player and sports broadcaster. A two-time Pro Bowl selection as an offensive tackle with the Pittsburgh Steelers, he was the first Turk to play in the National Football League (NFL). He was voted to the Pittsburgh Steelers All-Time Team. After his playing career, he was a television and radio analyst for the Steelers from 1998 to 2020.

== Playing career ==
Ilkin was born in Istanbul, Turkey; his parents Mehmet and Ayten Ilkin emigrated to the United States when he was two years old and settled in the Chicago area. He attended Highland Park High School in Highland Park, Illinois, where he won All Conference and All County honors as a football player. In 1975, he was granted an athletic scholarship to Indiana State University, where he played for head coaches Tom Harp (1975–77) and Dick Jamieson; a three-time All-Missouri Valley Conference pick, he was chosen 165th overall by the Steelers in the sixth round of the 1980 NFL draft.

Ilkin played offensive tackle for the Steelers from 1980 to 1992, earning two Pro Bowl appearance honors (1988 and 1989). He played for the Green Bay Packers in 1993 before retiring from football. Ilkin served as vice president of the NFL Players' Association from 1989 to 1994. He was named to the Pittsburgh Steelers All-Time Team in 2007.

== Broadcasting career ==
After retiring from football, Ilkin began appearing as a commentator and reporter on sports broadcasts in the Pittsburgh market and, nationally, worked as a game analyst for NBC during the 1995 NFL season. He was paired with either Dan Hicks or Jim Donovan.

In 1998, he joined the official Steelers broadcasting team of Myron Cope and Bill Hillgrove as an analyst on the Pittsburgh Steelers Radio Network. After Cope's retirement following the 2004 season, the team decided not to replace Cope, and Ilkin took on the color-commentary duties once carried by Cope. He worked alongside sideline reporter and former teammate Craig Wolfley, who, like Ilkin, joined the Steelers via the 1980 draft. As color commentator, Ilkin called the Steelers' most recent Super Bowl victories in Super Bowl XL and Super Bowl XLIII along with Hillgrove and Wolfley. Ilkin and Wolfley hosted a morning radio show called In The Locker Room with Tunch and Wolf on WBGG. After 2006, In The Locker Room was broadcast daily during the football season: locally on 970 ESPN in Pittsburgh, and nationally on Steelers Nation Radio (SNR).

== Business interests ==
Ilkin was the senior vice president of the Athletic Training Network, a company that provides athletic training and program material to coaches and players. Ilkin also co-authored two books during his broadcasting career: In the Locker Room, and Forged In Steel.

Ilkin was an active supporter of the nonprofit organization Light of Life Rescue Mission, a homeless shelter and addiction recovery ministry on Pittsburgh's North Side for over 30 years.

== Personal life ==
Ilkin was married on April 24, 1982, to Sharon Senefeld, and they had three children: Tanner, Natalie, and Clay. The Ilkins resided in Upper St. Clair Township, Pennsylvania. On February 6, 2012, his wife Sharon died following a lengthy battle with cancer. In 2013, he married Karen Rafferty. A convert from Islam to Christianity, Ilkin was the pastor of Men's Ministry for The Bible Chapel, a multi-site church in South Hills, Pittsburgh.

During a November 2013 visit to Turkey, he took part in activities of the Istanbul Cavaliers, and was interviewed by the sports newspaper Fanatik. Ilkin said in that interview that he would have liked to coach an American football team in Turkey.

On October 9, 2020, Ilkin announced that he was diagnosed with amyotrophic lateral sclerosis (ALS). Ilkin made the announcement six months before one of his contemporaries, former Chicago Bears defensive lineman Steve McMichael, announced his own ALS diagnosis. The Pittsburgh City Council declared December 21, 2020, as Tunch Ilkin Day in Pittsburgh. On June 3, 2021, Ilkin announced his retirement from broadcasting so he could focus on his treatment. Ilkin died of ALS complications on September 4, 2021, at the age of 63. Following his death, the episode of Pittsburgh Dad about the Steelers Week 1 matchup against the Buffalo Bills did a "In memory of..." tribute to Ilkin.

== Bibliography ==
- Ilkin, Tunch; Williams, Damian W.; Miner, Mark A. (2013). Forged in Steel: The Seven Time-Tested Leadership Principles Practiced by the Pittsburgh Steelers. Minerd.com Publishing, LLC. ISBN 978-0-98371-495-8.
- Ilkin, Tunch; Brown, Scott (2018). In the Locker Room: Tales of the Pittsburgh Steelers from the Playing Field to the Broadcast Booth. Triumph Books. ISBN 978-1-64125-088-7.

== See also ==
- List of NFL players born outside the United States
- List of Pittsburgh Steelers broadcasters
- List of Pittsburgh Steelers figures in broadcasting
- Pittsburgh Steelers all-time roster
