= Chris Hoke =

American football player (born 1976)

- Hoke in 2006 during the Steelers' Super Bowl XL parade

No. 76
- Position: Nose tackle

Personal information
- Born: April 6, 1976 (age 50); Long Beach, California, U.S.
- Listed height: 6 ft 2 in (1.88 m)
- Listed weight: 305 lb (138 kg)

Career information
- College: BYU
- NFL draft: 2001: undrafted

Career history
- Pittsburgh Steelers (2001–2011)

Awards and highlights
- 2× Super Bowl champion (XL, XLIII); Second-team All-MW (2000)

Career NFL statistics
- Total tackles: 112
- Sacks: 2
- Fumble recoveries: 1
- Stats at Pro Football Reference

Christopher L. Hoke (born April 6, 1976) is an American former professional football player. Hoke was a nose tackle for his entire career with the Pittsburgh Steelers of the National Football League (NFL). He played college football for the BYU Cougars.

== Early life ==
Hoke attended Foothill High School in Santa Ana, California, and won three varsity letters each in football and track and field. In football, he was a three-time All-League honoree, a two-time All-CIF honoree, and a two-time All-County honoree. As a senior, he was also named the League Defensive Player of the Year and helped lead his team to the CIF quarterfinals. In track and field, he was a three-time League Champion, and a three-time CIF Meet participant. Hoke graduated from Foothill High School in 1994.

== College career ==
Hoke's college career was put on hold for a 2-year mission for the Church of Jesus Christ of Latter-day Saints to Belgium and France. Hoke played college football for the BYU Cougars, where he finished his collegiate career with 141 tackles and 14 sacks. He majored in communications.

== Professional career ==
Hoke was signed by the Pittsburgh Steelers as an undrafted free agent after the 2001 NFL draft. For the first three years of his Steelers career, he was inactive for the majority of time and did not get any playing time. In 2004, Hoke totaled 24 tackles and 1 sack after taking over the starting nose tackle position for the injured Casey Hampton six games into the season. In 2005, he recorded six tackles and was also part of the Steelers team that won Super Bowl XL where he also recorded a tackle. The following season, he played in all 16 games and finished the season with 12 tackles. On June 21, 2007, he signed a 3-year extension through 2010. He finished the 2007 season with six tackles and 0.5 sacks. Hoke started his first game of the 2008 season in Pittsburgh's Monday Night Football game against the Ravens, in Week Four of the 2008 season.

Hoke announced his retirement on January 25, 2012. He spent his entire 11-year professional career with the Pittsburgh Steelers.

== NFL career statistics ==
Legend
**Bold**	Career high

=== Regular season ===
Year	Team	Games		Tackles					Interceptions					Fumbles			
Year	Team	GP	GS	Cmb	Solo	Ast	Sck	TFL	Int	Yds	TD	Lng	PD	FF	FR	Yds	TD
2004	PIT	14	**10**	**39**	**22**	**17**	**1.0**	**4**	0	0	0	0	0	0	0	0	0
2005	PIT	15	0	12	7	5	0.0	1	0	0	0	0	0	0	0	0	0
2006	PIT	**16**	1	17	12	5	0.0	2	0	0	0	0	0	0	0	0	0
2007	PIT	**16**	1	9	5	4	0.5	1	0	0	0	0	0	0	0	0	0
2008	PIT	**16**	3	16	12	4	0.5	2	0	0	0	0	0	0	0	0	0
2009	PIT	**16**	0	4	1	3	0.0	0	0	0	0	0	0	0	0	0	0
2010	PIT	15	1	12	7	5	0.0	2	0	0	0	0	0	0	**1**	0	0
2011	PIT	6	2	3	3	0	0.0	2	0	0	0	0	0	0	0	0	0
		114	18	112	69	43	2.0	14	0	0	0	0	0	0	1	0	0

=== Playoffs ===
Year	Team	Games		Tackles					Interceptions					Fumbles			
Year	Team	GP	GS	Cmb	Solo	Ast	Sck	TFL	Int	Yds	TD	Lng	PD	FF	FR	Yds	TD
2004	PIT	2	**2**	**5**	2	**3**	**1.0**	1	0	0	0	0	0	0	0	0	0
2005	PIT	**4**	0	4	**3**	1	**1.0**	**2**	0	0	0	0	0	0	0	0	0
2007	PIT	1	1	1	0	1	0.0	0	0	0	0	0	0	0	0	0	0
2008	PIT	3	0	0	0	0	0.0	0	0	0	0	0	0	0	0	0	0
2010	PIT	3	0	1	1	0	0.0	0	0	0	0	0	0	0	0	0	0
		13	3	11	6	5	2.0	3	0	0	0	0	0	0	0	0	0

== Broadcasting career ==
In 2015, Hoke replaced fellow ex-lineman Edmund Nelson as the Steelers post-game analyst on KDKA-TV.
