= Craig Wolfley =

American football player (1958–2025)

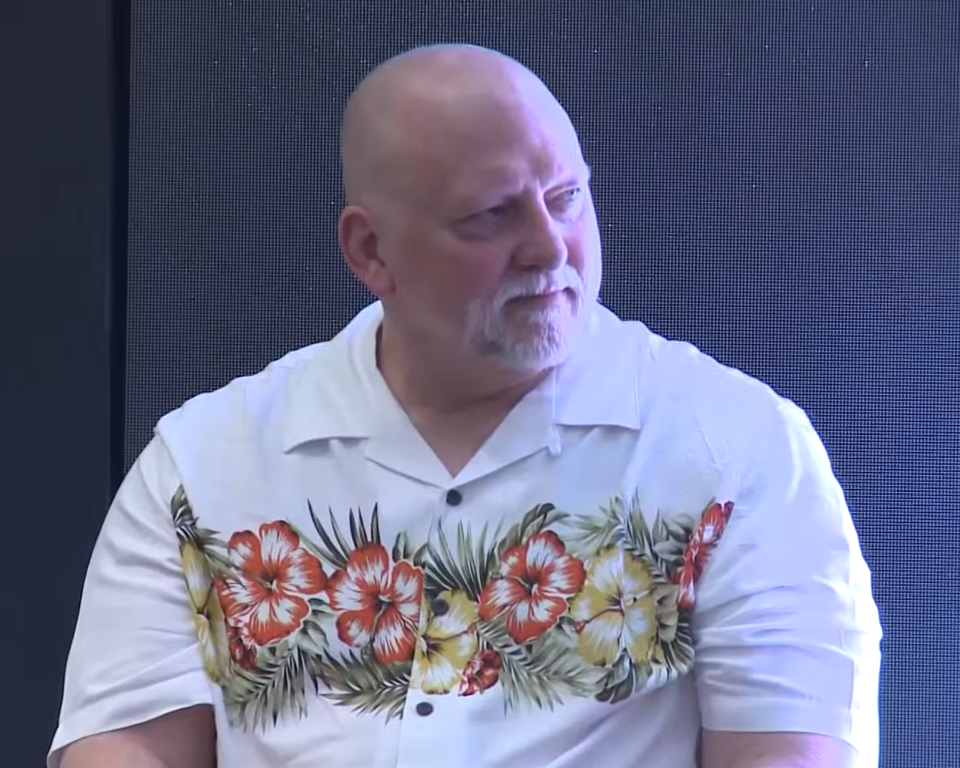
- Wolfley in 2016

No. 73
- Positions: Guard, tackle

Personal information
- Born: May 19, 1958; Buffalo, New York, U.S.
- Died: March 10, 2025 (aged 66)
- Listed height: 6 ft 1 in (1.85 m)
- Listed weight: 265 lb (120 kg)

Career information
- High school: Orchard Park (Orchard Park, New York)
- College: Syracuse
- NFL draft: 1980: 5th round, 138th overall pick

Career history
- Pittsburgh Steelers (1980–1989); Minnesota Vikings (1990–1991)

Awards and highlights
- Pittsburgh Steelers Hall of Honor; 2× Third-team All-American (1978, 1979); 2× First-team All-East (1978, 1979)

Career NFL statistics
- Games played: 153
- Games started: 104
- Fumble recoveries: 7
- Stats at Pro Football Reference

Competition record

Strongman

Representing United States

World's Strongest Man
5th	1981 World's Strongest Man

Craig Alan Wolfley (May 19, 1958 – March 10, 2025) was an American professional football player and color analyst for the Pittsburgh Steelers of the National Football League (NFL). He played in the NFL as an offensive lineman, spending most of his career with the Steelers before finishing with the Minnesota Vikings. Along with fellow Steeler Tunch Ilkin and later Max Starks, he hosted a show, In the Locker Room, on WBGG.

== College career ==
Wolfley attended Syracuse University from 1976 to 1979. He was a four-year letter winner as an offensive lineman. In 1999, Wolfley was named to the Syracuse University Football All Century team.

== Professional career ==
A fifth round NFL draft pick (138th overall), he played offensive guard and offensive tackle for the Pittsburgh Steelers from 1980 to 1989. He ended his career with the Minnesota Vikings from 1990 to 1991. Wolfley started 104 games, the majority at left guard.

== Broadcasting career ==
Following his retirement, Wolfley began a broadcasting career with the Steelers on the Pittsburgh Steelers Radio Network. Wolfley served as a sideline reporter from 2002 to 2020, calling the Steelers' most recent Super Bowl victories in Super Bowl XL and Super Bowl XLIII. In addition, he hosted a daily radio show, In The Locker Room with Tunch and Wolf, on WBGG with his Steelers teammate and longtime friend Tunch Ilkin.

Following Ilkin's death in 2021, Wolfley replaced him as the team's color commentator on radio broadcasts. Former Steeler Max Starks replaced Ilkin on Wolfley's daily show in 2021, and Steelers current play-by play announcer Rob King replaced Wolfley in 2025 after Wolfley's death.

== Other sports ==
In addition to football, Wolfley competed in weight lifting, boxing, sumo wrestling and martial arts. In 1981, he placed fifth in the World's Strongest Man competition. In 2002, Wolfley lost a four-round boxing match to Butterbean. He also held a black belt in jiu jitsu.

== Personal life ==
Wolfley was an evangelical Christian. He attended South Hills Bible Chapel under the pastoral leadership of John Hay Munro with two other notable Steelers, Mike Webster and Tunch Ilkin. Ilkin has credited Wolfley with leading him to follow Jesus Christ.

Wolfley had three daughters with his wife, Faith, Megan, Hannah, and Esther, and three sons, Kyle, 'CJ', and Max. Two of those children are from a previous marriage. He and Faith were the former owners of the Wolfpack Boxing Club in Carnegie, Pennsylvania, where they taught boxing, martial arts and other athletics.

He was the brother of Ron Wolfley, former running back of the Arizona Cardinals and later their color analyst. The two Wolfley brothers were the first brothers to play for their NFL teams and then call their teams' radio broadcasts when the Steelers defeated the Cardinals 27–23 in Super Bowl XLIII.

In 2025, Wolfley wrote and released an autobiography, If These Walls Could Talk: Stories from the Pittsburgh Steelers, which recounts his life story, from his NFL career to his radio broadcasting career.

Wolfley died from cancer on March 10, 2025, at the age of 66.

== Bibliography ==
- Wolfley, Craig; Wexell, Jim (2025). If These Walls Could Talk: Pittsburgh Steelers. Triumph Books. ISBN 978-1-63727-763-8.

== See also ==
- List of Pittsburgh Steelers broadcasters
- List of Pittsburgh Steelers figures in broadcasting
- List of Pittsburgh Steelers players
