= Ron Wolfley =

American football player (born 1962)

No. 24, 26, 30
- Position: Running back

Personal information
- Born: October 14, 1962 (age 64); Blasdell, New York, U.S.
- Listed height: 6 ft 0 in (1.83 m)
- Listed weight: 225 lb (102 kg)

Career information
- High school: Orchard Park (Orchard Park, New York)
- College: West Virginia
- NFL draft: 1985: 4th round, 104th overall pick

Career history
- St. Louis / Phoenix Cardinals (1985–1991); Cleveland Browns (1992–1993); St. Louis Rams (1995)

Awards and highlights
- 4× Pro Bowl (1986–1989)

Career NFL statistics
- Rushing yards: 263
- Rushing average: 3.1
- Total touchdowns: 4
- Stats at Pro Football Reference

Ronald Paul Wolfley (born October 14, 1962) is an American former professional football player nicknamed Wolf. He was born in Blasdell, NY a suburb just outside of the Buffalo. He was a running back in the National Football League (NFL) for the St. Louis/Arizona Cardinals from 1985 through 1991. Wolfley was selected four times to the Pro Bowl as a special teams captain.

Wolfley was a three-sport athlete at Orchard Park High School before transferring to Frontier High School his senior year. His play at running back earned him all-league honors, nomination for the Connolly Cup in 1980, and a roster spot on the South squad for the Kensington's Lion Club All-Star game, where he holds the records for the most carriers with 26 in the history of the event. Later in life, Wolfley's sports accomplishments were commemorated when he was inducted in 2012 into the Greater Buffalo Sports Hall of Fame. Wolfley was awarded a scholarship to play collegiately for the West Virginia Mountaineers.

Until early 2025, Wolfley co-hosted a midday sports talk show on Arizona Sports 98.7 FM in Phoenix, Arizona with Luke Lapinski, entitled Wolf and Luke. Teamed with play-by-play announcer Dave Pasch, Wolfley was the color analyst on the Arizona Cardinals Radio Network from 2005 to 2024.

Wolfley is the younger brother of former offensive lineman Craig Wolfley, formerly of the Pittsburgh Steelers and Minnesota Vikings.

== College career ==
Wolfley arrived at West Virginia in 1981. In his freshman year, he saw little action. He only rushed for 13 yards on the season.

As a sophomore in 1982, Wolfley started at fullback, blocking for starting running back Curlin Beck. He also rushed for 355 yards and two touchdowns of his own, good enough to be second on the team, behind Beck.

As a junior in 1983, Wolfley again started at fullback, blocking for running back Tom Gray. Wolfley had a career-high 485 yards rushing and four touchdowns on 122 carries.

In 1984, his final season as a Mountaineer, Wolfley assumed the role of starting running back, amassing 475 total yards and four touchdowns. He also became captain of the team.

== Professional career ==
Wolfley was selected in the fourth round of the 1985 NFL draft by the St. Louis Cardinals. During his seven seasons as a Cardinal (during which the team moved from St. Louis to Phoenix), he totaled 252 yards and two scores. Wolfley was known for his fearless special teams play that allowed him to compete in four straight Pro Bowls from 1986 through 1989.

In 1992, he joined the Cleveland Browns, where he played for two seasons. In 1995, he joined the St. Louis Rams for his final professional season.

Wolfley is the only player to have played in St. Louis for both the Cardinals and the Rams, earning him the self-proclaimed moniker "America's Fullback."

== Personal life ==
Wolfley's older brother, Craig Wolfley, played professional football as an offensive lineman for the Pittsburgh Steelers from 1980 to 1989 and the Minnesota Vikings in 1990 and 1991. Craig died from cancer at age 66 in 2025.
