= Charlie Batch =

American football player (born 1974)

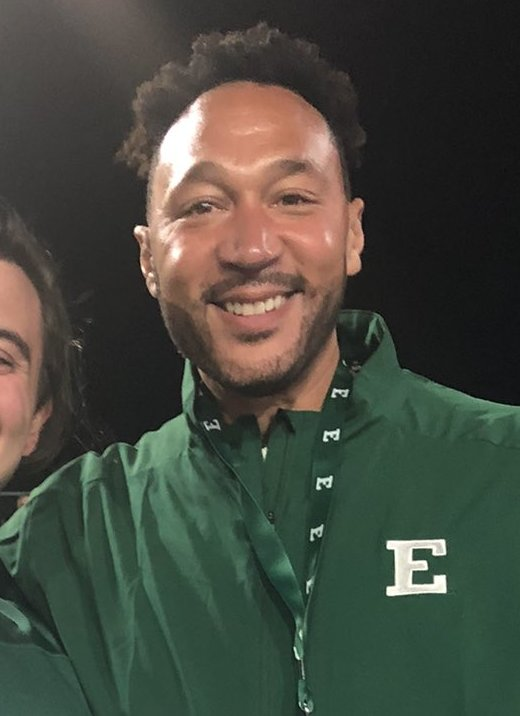
- Batch in 2021

No. 10, 16
- Position: Quarterback

Personal information
- Born: December 5, 1974 (age 51); Homestead, Pennsylvania, U.S.
- Listed height: 6 ft 2 in (1.88 m)
- Listed weight: 216 lb (98 kg)

Career information
- High school: Steel Valley (Munhall, Pennsylvania)
- College: Eastern Michigan (1993–1997)
- NFL draft: 1998: 2nd round, 60th overall pick

Career history
- Detroit Lions (1998–2001); Pittsburgh Steelers (2002–2012)

Awards and highlights
- 2× Super Bowl champion (XL, XLIII); First-team All-MAC (1995); Byron "Whizzer" White NFL Man of the Year (2012); NFL record: Highest single game total quarterback rating

Career NFL statistics
- Passing attempts: 1,604
- Passing completions: 908
- Completion percentage: 56.6%
- TD–INT: 61–52
- Passing yards: 11,085
- Passer rating: 77.2
- Rushing yards: 637
- Rushing touchdowns: 6
- Stats at Pro Football Reference

Charles D'Donte Batch (born December 5, 1974) is an American former professional football player who was a quarterback in the National Football League (NFL). He played college football for the Eastern Michigan Eagles. He was selected by the Detroit Lions in the second round of the 1998 NFL draft and played 15 seasons in the NFL, most of it as a backup with his hometown Pittsburgh Steelers, with whom he earned two Super Bowl rings (Super Bowl XL and Super Bowl XLIII).

Batch currently works for KDKA-TV in Pittsburgh as a pre-game analyst for the Steelers as well as a color commentator for their preseason games. In addition, he co-hosts the Steeler Post-Game Show on WDVE Radio. Batch also works with Champs Sports Network as a color analyst for WPIAL high school football and basketball broadcasts.

== Early life ==
Charles D'Donte Batch was born on December 5, 1974, in Homestead, Pennsylvania. He is the son of Lynne Settles, a former school teacher and Nilesh Shah, a former Pittsburgh steel mill operator. Batch attended Steel Valley High School in Munhall, Pennsylvania.

== College career ==
Batch had a remarkable career at Eastern Michigan University, owning almost every passing record. He finished his college career with 7,592 passing yards and 53 passing touchdowns. He also earned a degree in criminal justice. Batch pledged the Zeta Epsilon chapter of Phi Beta Sigma fraternity.

== Professional career ==
Pre-draft measurables
Height	Weight	Arm length	Hand span	40-yard dash	10-yard split	20-yard split	20-yard shuttle	Three-cone drill	Vertical jump
6 ft 1 7/8 in (1.88 m)	216 lb (98 kg)	33 3/4 in (0.86 m)	9 3/4 in (0.25 m)	4.89 s	1.73 s	2.87 s	4.11 s	7.60 s	33.5 in (0.85 m)
All values from NFL Combine

=== Detroit Lions ===
Batch was a local favorite when he was selected by the Detroit Lions in the second round of the 1998 NFL draft. He was the Lions' starter through better parts of the 1998–2001 seasons. After the surprising retirement of running back Barry Sanders in 1999, Detroit struggled to find consistency in its running game, and Batch was asked to assume a "hybrid" quarterback role and assist in the Lions' running game by using various quarterback sweeps, bootlegs, and quarterback draws in an attempt to keep defenders off balance. He proved to be effective, but injury prone, in his years with Detroit. In 1999, the year Sanders retired, Batch helped rally Detroit to a surprising wildcard playoff game against the Washington Redskins. Batch did not play in the game, giving way to Gus Frerotte due to injury, and Detroit lost 27–13.

The 2000 season proved to be Batch's last full season as an NFL starter. He was injured (leaving the Week 17 matchup against Chicago with a shoulder injury) in a pivotal game in which Detroit lost on a last-second field goal by Paul Edinger. The game cost the Lions a playoff berth and set into motion a radical turn of events in the Lions' front office, resulting in the hiring of Fox Sports color commentator Matt Millen as the new CEO and general manager. Millen's arrival ultimately resulted in an extreme makeover in Detroit's roster, and Batch became one of the more visible casualties.

He started the 2001 season as Detroit's starter under new head coach Marty Mornhinweg, but was injured late in 2001. Batch was replaced mid-season by Ty Detmer for whom the Cleveland Browns received a fourth round pick, but had already planned to cut him. Detmer immediately came in as a starter only to throw seven interceptions against his former team. Batch was eventually released by the Lions that offseason for stated salary cap reasons. Batch had been deemed expendable due in part to the team's drafting of Joey Harrington with their first-round pick, and Millen had gone on record in his desire to find a starting quarterback other than Batch earlier that year. Still, Batch passed for over 9,000 yards with Detroit, reaching sixth on the Lions' all-time list. Ironically, Batch would ultimately last longer in the NFL than Harrington, who would prove to be a draft bust and was out of the NFL by 2009.

=== Pittsburgh Steelers ===
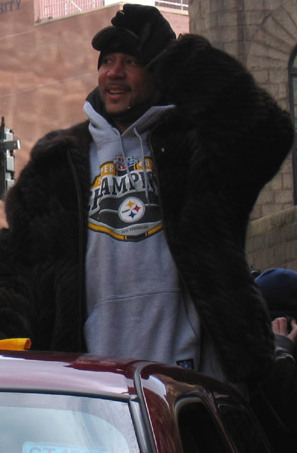
Batch at the Super Bowl XL parade in 2006

The Pittsburgh Steelers signed him to a one-year contract for 2002 as a backup, but he did not play. The move to initially sign Batch was not a surprise, given that Batch was from Pittsburgh and the Steelers' current Director of Football Operations Kevin Colbert initially drafted Batch in Detroit. Despite not playing in 2002 (being third string behind Kordell Stewart and Tommy Maddox, who split the year as the starters), Batch became popular with Steeler fans, partly due to having grown up in nearby Homestead, Pennsylvania but also because of his charity work.

His contract was renewed by the Steelers, and Batch saw some action in 2003. In 2004, Batch spent the season on injured reserve after offseason knee surgery. In 2005, he became the second-string quarterback for the Steelers, playing behind Ben Roethlisberger. During 2005, an injury to Roethlisberger gave Batch two starting opportunities, yielding two victories. In the process, Batch became the first Pittsburgh-area native to start for the team at quarterback since Terry Hanratty, a native of Butler, Pennsylvania, started for a few games during his rookie season in 1969 before becoming a backup the following season to Terry Bradshaw.

He backed up Roethlisberger during Super Bowl XL, and the Steelers' 21–10 victory made Batch a Super Bowl champion.

On March 14, 2006, Charlie Batch signed a 3-year deal, through the 2008 season.

He was also one of several Pittsburgh Steelers players that visited Roethlisberger in the hospital to hear of his condition after his motorcycle accident on June 12, 2006.

Batch was again tapped to fill in for Roethlisberger to start the Steelers 2006 season when Roethlisberger had to have an emergency appendectomy the week before the season started. Batch had his best game in over four years, throwing for 209 yards, three touchdowns, and no interceptions. He also threw the first touchdown pass of the 2006 regular season. Batch temporarily replaced Roethlisberger in week 7 in Atlanta when Roethlisberger went down with a concussion. Batch completed 8 of 13 passes for 195 yards and two touchdowns, including a 70-yard touchdown pass to Hines Ward.

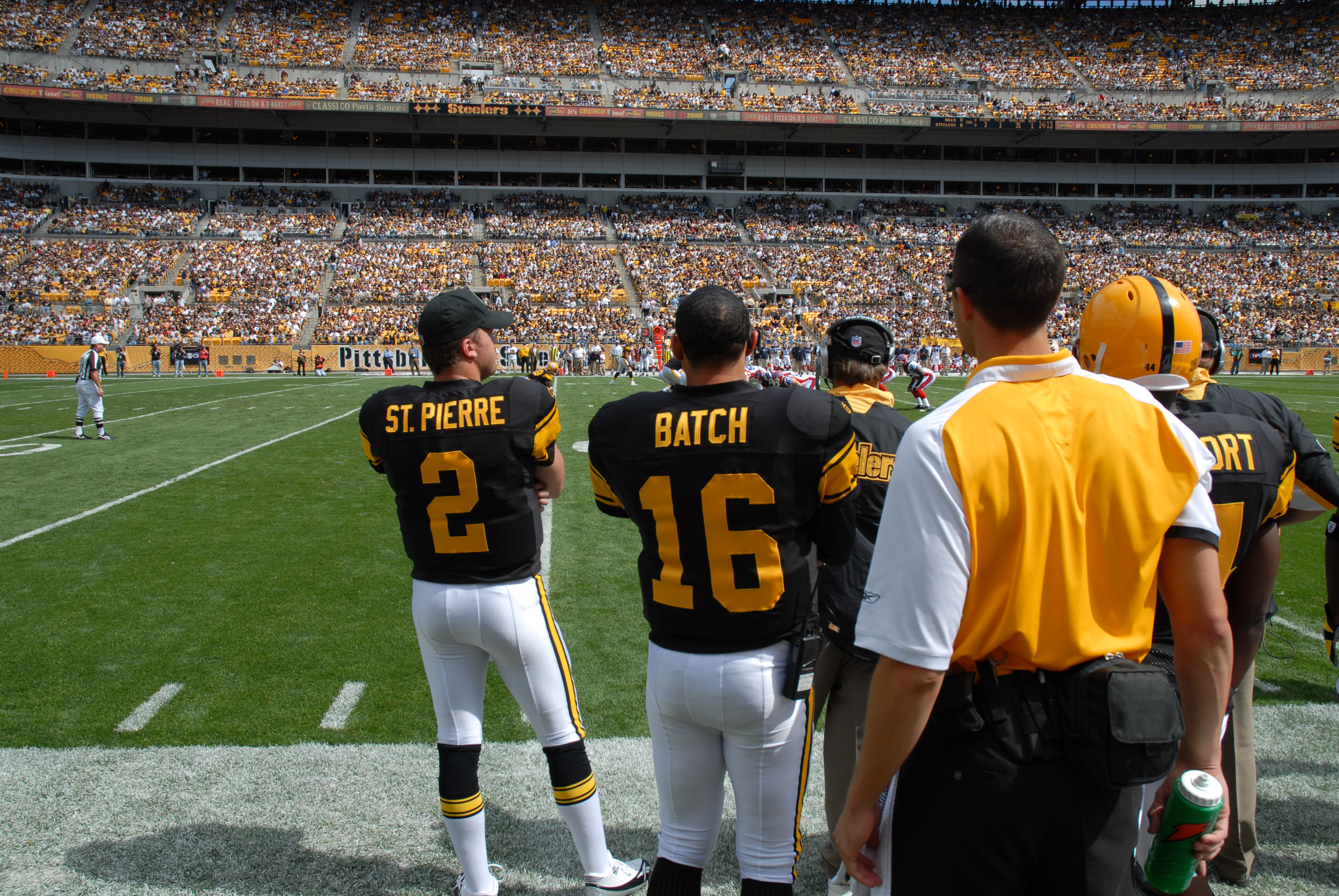
Batch and Brian St. Pierre on the sideline in 2007

On August 8, 2008, Batch sustained a broken clavicle in the second quarter of a pre-season game against the Philadelphia Eagles at Heinz Field. The team signed former Jacksonville Jaguars starter Byron Leftwich. Batch was placed on season-ending injured reserve on August 30.

On April 14, 2009, Batch, who was an unrestricted free agent after the 2008 season, re-signed with the Steelers.

On November 22, 2009, Batch took over in a week 11 game against the Kansas City Chiefs in overtime after Roethlisberger was injured. During the overtime drive, he threw one pass for 17 yards, putting them two yards out of field goal range. However, on third down, the Steelers opted to run (rather than relying on Batch's arm), which resulted in yards lost and a punt. Batch's wrist was injured during the game and required surgery. He missed six weeks, ending his regular season.

On March 26, 2010, Batch re-signed with the Steelers for another two seasons.

With Roethlisberger being suspended four games by the NFL to start the 2010 season, and with both Dennis Dixon and Byron Leftwich out with injured knees, Batch led the Steelers to a 38–13 win over the Tampa Bay Buccaneers in week three. Batch tied a career-high with three touchdown passes. Because of this, Steelers coach Mike Tomlin stated that Batch had earned a starting role in week 4 versus Baltimore (which the Steelers lost 17–14).

Batch signed a one-year contract to remain with the Steelers on April 16, 2012.

After a sternoclavicular (SC) joint and rib injury to Roethlisberger in week 10 of the 2012 season and a rib injury to Byron Leftwich in week 11, Batch was the starting quarterback for the week 12 matchup vs. the Cleveland Browns, during which the Pittsburgh Steelers turned the ball over eight times (three interceptions by Batch and five fumbles by five other players) and lost 20–14. A week later, Batch led the Steelers to victory over the division-leading Baltimore Ravens 23–20 in Baltimore. Batch drove the Steelers down the field, connecting with Heath Miller for a game-tying touchdown late in the fourth quarter. He then led the game-winning drive, which culminated in a Shaun Suisham 42-yard field goal.

With the Steelers drafting Oklahoma quarterback Landry Jones in the 2013 NFL draft, the team announced that Batch would not be returning to the team for 2013, ending his 11-year tenure with the team. At the time of Batch's departure his tenure was the second-longest in team history for a quarterback, behind only Terry Bradshaw, although this feat has subsequently been surpassed by Roethlisberger.

In 2020, NFL Films released a short about Batch called "Charlie Batch: the Journey of the Greatest Backup QB".

== Career statistics ==
=== NFL ===
==== Regular season ====
Year	Team	Games			Passing								Rushing				Sacks		Fumbles (Note: Fumbles lost data taken from Pro Football Reference career game log)	
Year	Team	GP	GS	Record	Cmp	Att	Pct	Yds	Y/A	TD	Int	Rtg	Att	Yds	Avg	TD	Sck	SckY	Fum	Lost
1998	DET	12	12	5–7	173	303	57.1	2,178	7.2	11	6	83.5	41	229	5.6	1	37	222	2	2
1999	DET	11	10	6–4	151	270	55.9	1,957	7.2	13	7	84.1	28	87	3.1	2	36	186	4	1
2000	DET	15	15	8–7	221	412	53.6	2,489	6.0	13	15	67.3	44	199	4.5	2	41	242	6	3
2001	DET	10	9	0–9	198	341	58.1	2,392	7.0	12	12	76.8	12	45	3.8	0	33	176	6	4
2002	PIT	0	0	DNP																
2003	PIT	4	0	–	4	8	50.0	47	5.9	0	0	68.2	1	11	11.0	0	1	2	1	1
2004	PIT	0	0	DNP																
2005	PIT	4	2	2–0	23	36	63.9	246	6.8	1	1	81.5	11	30	2.7	1	1	6	1	0
2006	PIT	8	1	1–0	31	53	58.5	492	9.3	5	0	121.0	13	15	1.2	0	3	13	1	1
2007	PIT	7	1	0–1	17	36	47.2	232	6.4	2	3	52.1	12	-7	-0.6	0	0	0	0	0
2008	PIT	0	0	DNP																
2009	PIT	1	0	–	1	2	50.0	17	8.5	0	0	79.2	0	0	0.0	0	0	0	0	0
2010	PIT	3	2	1–1	29	49	59.2	352	7.2	3	3	76.2	7	30	4.3	0	4	21	2	0
2011	PIT	4	1	1–0	15	24	62.5	208	8.7	0	1	72.9	3	-2	-0.7	0	2	10	0	0
2012	PIT	2	2	1–1	45	70	64.3	475	6.8	1	4	64.9	0	0	0.0	0	3	12	1	0
Career		81	55	25–30	908	1,604	56.6	11,085	6.9	61	52	77.2	172	637	3.7	6	161	890	24	12

==== Playoffs ====
Year	Team	Games			Passing								Rushing				Sacks		Fumbles	
Year	Team	GP	GS	Record	Cmp	Att	Pct	Yds	Y/A	TD	Int	Rtg	Att	Yds	Avg	TD	Sck	SckY	Fum	Lost
1999	DET	0	0	DNP																
2002	PIT	0	0	DNP																
2004	PIT	0	0	DNP																
2005	PIT	0	0	DNP																
2007	PIT	0	0	DNP																
2008	PIT	0	0	DNP																
2010	PIT	0	0	DNP																
2011	PIT	0	0	DNP																

=== College ===
Season	Team	Passing								Rushing			
Season	Team	Cmp	Att	Pct	Yds	Y/A	TD	Int	Rtg	Att	Yds	Avg	TD
1994	Eastern Michigan	49	78	62.8	617	7.9	7	1	156.3	23	0	0.0	1
1995	Eastern Michigan	244	421	58.0	3,177	7.5	21	17	129.7	61	52	0.9	3
1996	Eastern Michigan	39	65	60.0	518	8.0	2	2	130.9	12	-39	-3.3	0
1997	Eastern Michigan	247	434	56.9	3,280	7.6	23	11	132.8	85	110	1.3	1
Career		579	998	58.0	7,592	7.6	53	31	133.2	181	123	0.7	5

== Broadcasting career ==
Although Batch did not officially announce his retirement from the NFL, he took a Steelers pre-game studio analyst job with KDKA-TV for the 2013 season alongside KDKA-TV sports anchor Bob Pompeani and ex-Steeler defensive lineman Edmund Nelson, effectively ending his NFL career. He continued in this role for the 2014 season.

In 2015, Batch replaced the retiring Nelson as KDKA-TV's color commentator for preseason games, while becoming the main studio analyst for the Steelers pre-game coverage prior to the national airing of The NFL Today. Former teammate Chris Hoke replaced Nelson for the post-game show.

== Charity ==
In 2006, Batch was presented with the first Jerome Bettis Award for Humanity and Community Service for his work supporting children through his Best of the Batch Foundation and for efforts to upgrade local football fields and basketball courts for area kids. This annual award is presented to a Pittsburgh individual who demonstrates the image of the award title. Batch was chosen because of his commitment to his hometown of Homestead, Pennsylvania, by bringing to the area programs for the children through his Best of the Batch Foundation and upgrading basketball courts and football fields for the kids to use.

Batch has also been recognized for his efforts with underprivileged urban youth. The Schramm-McCracken Prize was bestowed on Charlie Batch in 2002 by the Three Rivers District of the Loyal Order of Moose in large part for his creation and work at the Charlie Batch Urban Pumpkin Patch and Gardens. The CBUPP was a created as a way to help fight hunger, using Urban Agriculture and local gang activity by employing inner city youth in a sustainable, green future.
