= List of Pittsburgh Steelers broadcasters =

Since 1999, the Steelers' flagship radio stations are WDVE 102.5 FM and WBGG 970 AM. Both stations are owned by IHeartMedia. Games are also available on 49 radio stations in Pennsylvania, western Maryland, Ohio, West Virginia and in Myrtle Beach, South Carolina. The announcers are Rob King and Max Starks. Missi Matthews is the sideline reporter. Myron Cope, the longtime color analyst and inventor of the "Terrible Towel," retired after the 2004 season, and died in 2008.

King replaced Bill Hillgrove as radio voice of the Steelers in 2023. Hillgrove, longtime radio voice of the University of Pittsburgh football and men's basketball teams, had been the voice of the Steelers for 30 seasons after succeeding Jack Fleming in 1994. Ironically, Hillgrove and Fleming were often in opposing radio booths during the annual Backyard Brawl, with Hillgrove calling play-by-play for Pitt and Fleming for the West Virginia Mountaineers.

Pre-season games not shown on one of the national broadcasters are seen on KDKA, channel 2. KDKA Sports Director Bob Pompeani and former Steelers QB Charlie Batch handle the broadcast duties. Coach Mike McCarthy's weekly press conference is shown live on KDKA-TV's sister station WPKD-TV, channel 19.

National NFL Network broadcasts are shown locally on KDKA-TV, while national ESPN broadcasts are shown locally on WTAE, channel 4.

== See also ==
- List of Pittsburgh Steelers figures in broadcasting
