= Bryce Fisher =

American football player (born 1977)

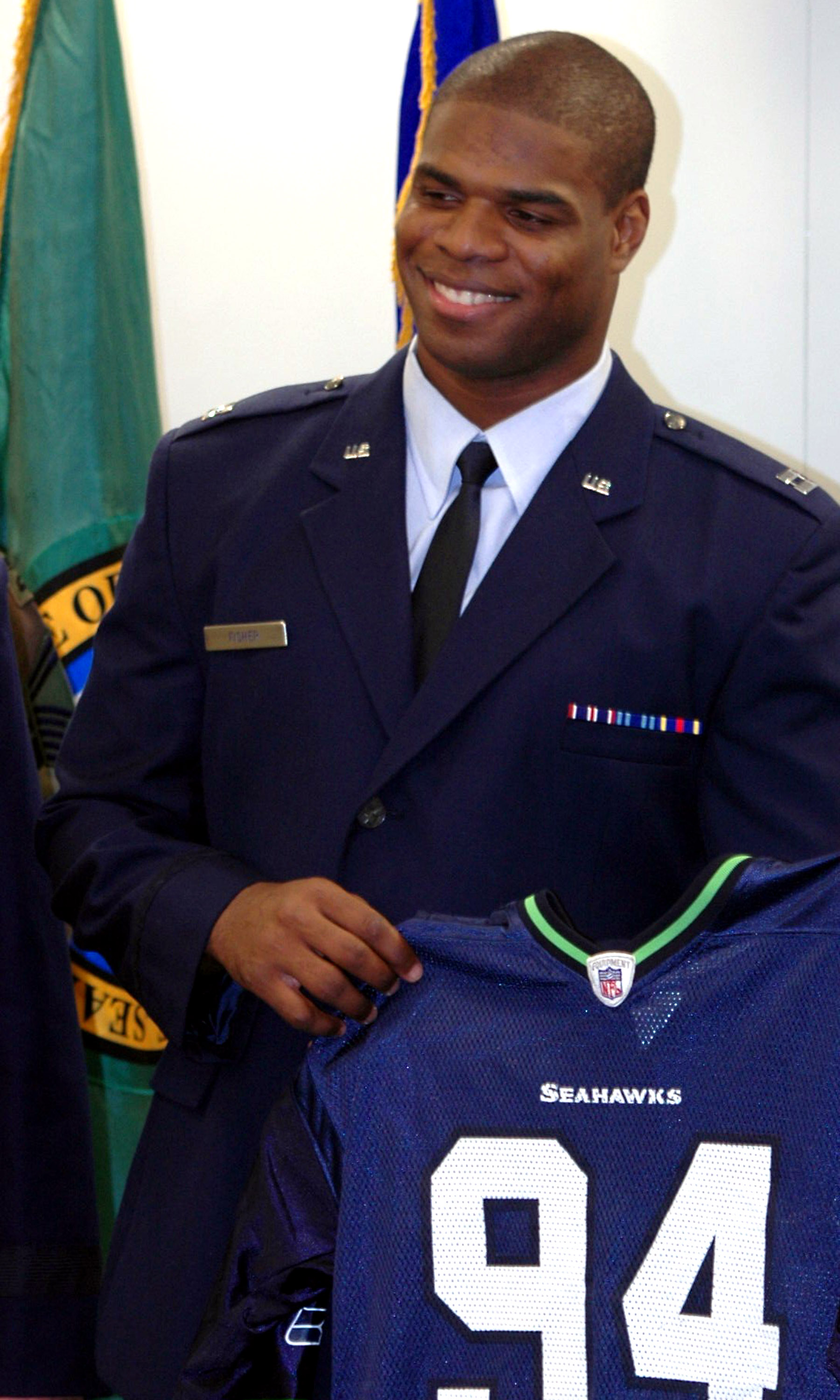
- Fisher in 2005

No. 95, 94
- Position: Defensive end

Personal information
- Born: May 12, 1977 (age 49); Renton, Washington, U.S.
- Listed height: 6 ft 4 in (1.93 m)
- Listed weight: 272 lb (123 kg)

Career information
- High school: Seattle Prep (Seattle, Washington)
- College: Air Force
- NFL draft: 1999: 7th round, 248th overall pick

Career history
- Buffalo Bills (1999–2001); St. Louis Rams (2002–2004); Seattle Seahawks (2005–2007); Tennessee Titans (2007)

Career NFL statistics
- Total tackles: 227
- Sacks: 26.5
- Forced fumbles: 5
- Fumble recoveries: 1
- Pass deflections: 12
- Military career
- Allegiance: United States
- Branch: United States Air Force; Illinois Air National Guard
- Service years: 1999-present
- Rank: Major
- Stats at Pro Football Reference

Bryce Alexander Fisher (born May 12, 1977) is a former American professional football player who was a defensive lineman in the National Football League (NFL). He was selected by the Buffalo Bills in the seventh round of the 1999 NFL draft and played college football for the Air Force Falcons.

== Early life ==
Fisher attended Seattle Preparatory School and was a three-year letterman in football. At Prep, he played for head coach Rollie Robbins and defensive coordinator Mitch Robbins. As a senior, he was an All-League selection and was named the League's Lineman of the Year.

== College career ==
Fisher played college football at the United States Air Force Academy in Colorado Springs, where he was a two-year starter on the defensive line for the Falcons. Selected as WAC Defensive Player of the Year in Mountain Division as a senior, he started 12 games and recorded career-high 70 tackles, six sacks, and one fumble recovery. He started 12 games as a junior; he totaled 63 tackles, 1.5 sacks, one forced fumble, and one fumble recovery. He played in seven games as backup defensive lineman in his sophomore season.

== Professional career ==
=== Pre-draft ===
Pre-draft measurables
Height	Weight	40-yard dash	10-yard split	20-yard split	20-yard shuttle	Three-cone drill	Vertical jump	Broad jump	Bench press	Wonderlic
6 ft 3 5/8 in (1.92 m)	283 lb (128 kg)	5.00 s	1.75 s	2.88 s	4.34 s	7.64 s	29 1/2 in (0.75 m)	8 ft 10 in (2.69 m)	19 reps	x
All values from NFL Combine

=== Buffalo Bills ===
Fisher was selected in the seventh round (248th overall) in the 1999 NFL draft by the Buffalo Bills. He joined the Bills in 2001 after fulfilling a two-year commitment to the Air Force. In 2001, he played in 13 games with two starts for the Bills and finished the season with 33 tackles and three sacks.

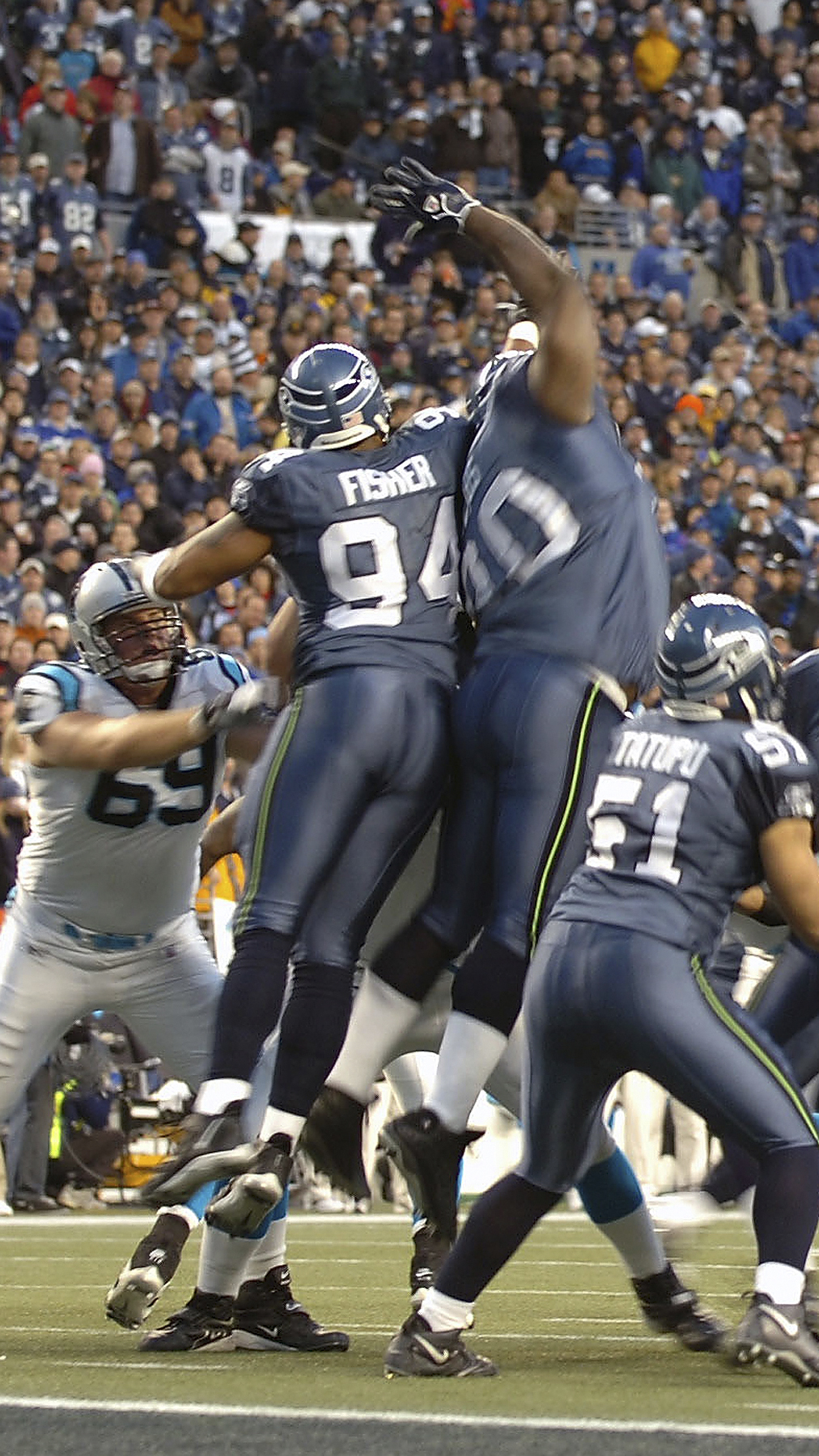
Fisher (second right) attempting a block during a game in 2006

=== St. Louis Rams ===
On September 4, 2002, the St. Louis Rams claimed Fisher off waivers from the Buffalo Bills. In 2002 Fisher saw action in four games on defense and special teams, completing the season with 11 tackles and three quarterback pressures on defense and one special teams tackle. In 2003, he played in all 16 games, starting one at left defensive end, and made a career-high 47 tackles with two tackles for loss, two sacks, one pass defense, two forced fumbles, and a team and career-high 27 special teams tackles. In 2004, he started 14 of 16 games for the Rams, totaling career highs with 77 tackles and 8.5 sacks (which led the team) and posting two forced fumbles and three passes defensed.

=== Seattle Seahawks ===
On March 16, 2005, Fisher agreed to a four-year, $10 million contract with the Seahawks one season after leading St. Louis with 8.5 sacks. Started 15 games for the Seahawks and led the club with a career-high 9.0 sacks in 2005. Fisher made 47 tackles, eight passes defensed, and a forced fumble. The next season, 2006, Fisher started all 16 games at left defensive end and totaled 46 tackles with 4.0 sacks and a fumble recovery.

=== Tennessee Titans ===
The Seattle Seahawks traded him to the Tennessee Titans on September 11, 2007, after Fisher had played one game for Seattle. Fisher played 9 games in for the Titans in 2007 and made five tackles and deflected a pass. He was later released on July 23, 2008.

== Personal life ==
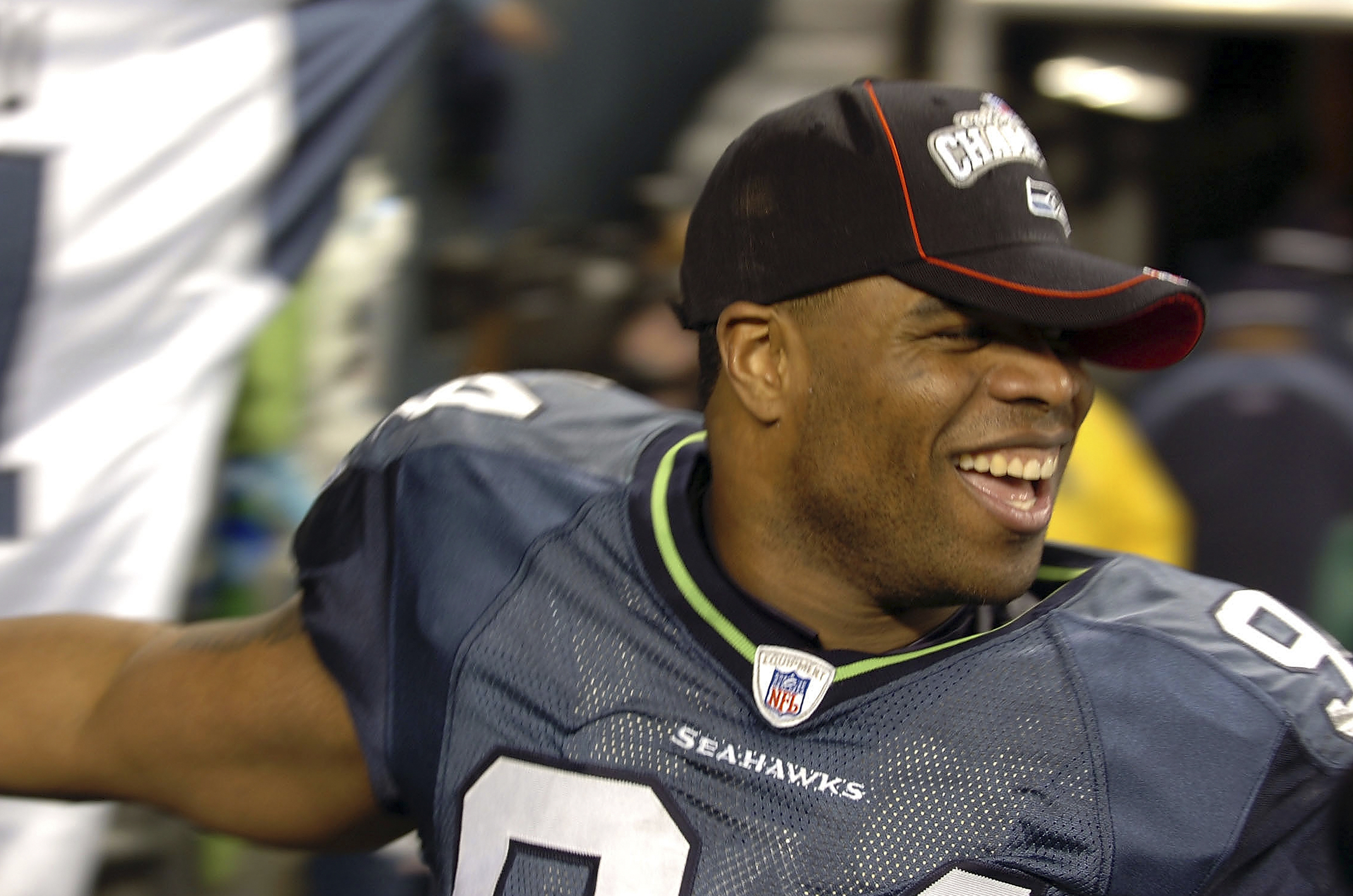
Fisher shortly after the Seahawks won the NFC Championship in 2006.

When not playing football, Fisher is a major and a public affairs officer in the Illinois Air National Guard. Fisher completed combat survival training in the summer of 1996 and spent two years (1999–00) on active duty with the Air Force. He was at the Air Force Academy in Colorado Springs, CO, in 1999, where he worked as a recruiter and coached the defensive line for the JV football team. Worked in 2000 as Vehicle Operations Officer at Pope Air Force Base in Fayetteville, North Carolina. He has three daughters
