= Super Bowl XL =

2006 National Football League championship game

Seattle Seahawks (1) (NFC) (13–3)	Pittsburgh Steelers (6) (AFC) (11–5)
10	21
Head coach: Mike Holmgren	Head coach: Bill Cowher
	1	2	3	4	Total
SEA	3	0	7	0	10
PIT	0	7	7	7	21
- Date: February 5, 2006
- Stadium: Ford Field; Detroit, Michigan
- MVP: Hines Ward, wide receiver
- Favorite: Steelers by 4
- Referee: Bill Leavy
- Attendance: 68,206

Ceremonies
- National anthem: Aaron Neville, Aretha Franklin, and Dr. John; ASL performed by Angela LaGuardia
- Coin toss: Tom Brady, representing previous Super Bowl MVPs
- Halftime show: The Rolling Stones

TV in the United States
- Network: ABC
- Announcers: Al Michaels, John Madden, Michele Tafoya, and Suzy Kolber
- Nielsen ratings: 41.6 (national); 55 (Seattle); 57.1 (Pittsburgh); U.S. viewership: 90.7 million est. avg., 141.4 million est. total
- Market share: 62 (national)
- Cost of 30-second commercial: $2.5 million

Radio in the United States
- Network: Westwood One
- Announcers: Marv Albert, Boomer Esiason, John Dockery, and Bonnie Bernstein

Super Bowl XL was an American football game between the National Football Conference (NFC) champion Seattle Seahawks and the American Football Conference (AFC) champion Pittsburgh Steelers to decide the National Football League (NFL) champion for the 2005 season. The Steelers defeated the Seahawks by the score of 21–10. The game was played on February 5, 2006, at Ford Field in Detroit, Michigan. It is the most recent Super Bowl to air on ABC, which lost the rights to broadcast them in the next NFL television contract (though under the latest contract, the network is set to broadcast Super Bowl LXI alongside ESPN), and the first where all aspects of the game itself were aired in HD. This was the last of 10 straight Super Bowls to feature a team seeking its first win in the game.

With the win, the Steelers tied the San Francisco 49ers and the Dallas Cowboys with the then-record five Super Bowl victories (a record the Steelers themselves would break three years later). The Steelers' victory was their first Super Bowl victory since Super Bowl XIV. The Steelers, who finished the regular season with an 11–5 record, also became the fourth wild card team, the third in nine years, and the first ever number 6 seed in the NFL playoffs, to win a Super Bowl. The Seahawks, on the other hand, in their 30th season, were making their first ever Super Bowl appearance after posting an NFC-best 13–3 regular season record.

The Steelers capitalized on two big plays that were converted into touchdowns. The Steelers jumped to a 14–3 lead early in the third quarter with running back Willie Parker's Super Bowl record 75-yard touchdown run. Kelly Herndon's then-Super Bowl record 76-yard interception return set up a Seattle touchdown to cut the lead 14–10. The Steelers then responded with Antwaan Randle El's 43-yard touchdown pass to Hines Ward, the first time a wide receiver threw a touchdown pass in a Super Bowl, to clinch the game in the fourth quarter. Ward, who caught 5 passes for 123 yards and a touchdown, while also rushing for 18 yards, was named Super Bowl MVP.

In retrospect, Super Bowl XL has been negatively received for its officiating, with several game-altering calls in favor of Pittsburgh. It was met with criticism from members of the media soon after the game, leading NFL Films to rank it as one of the top ten controversial calls of all time. The game remains one of the most controversial in Super Bowl history.

== Background ==
=== Host selection process ===
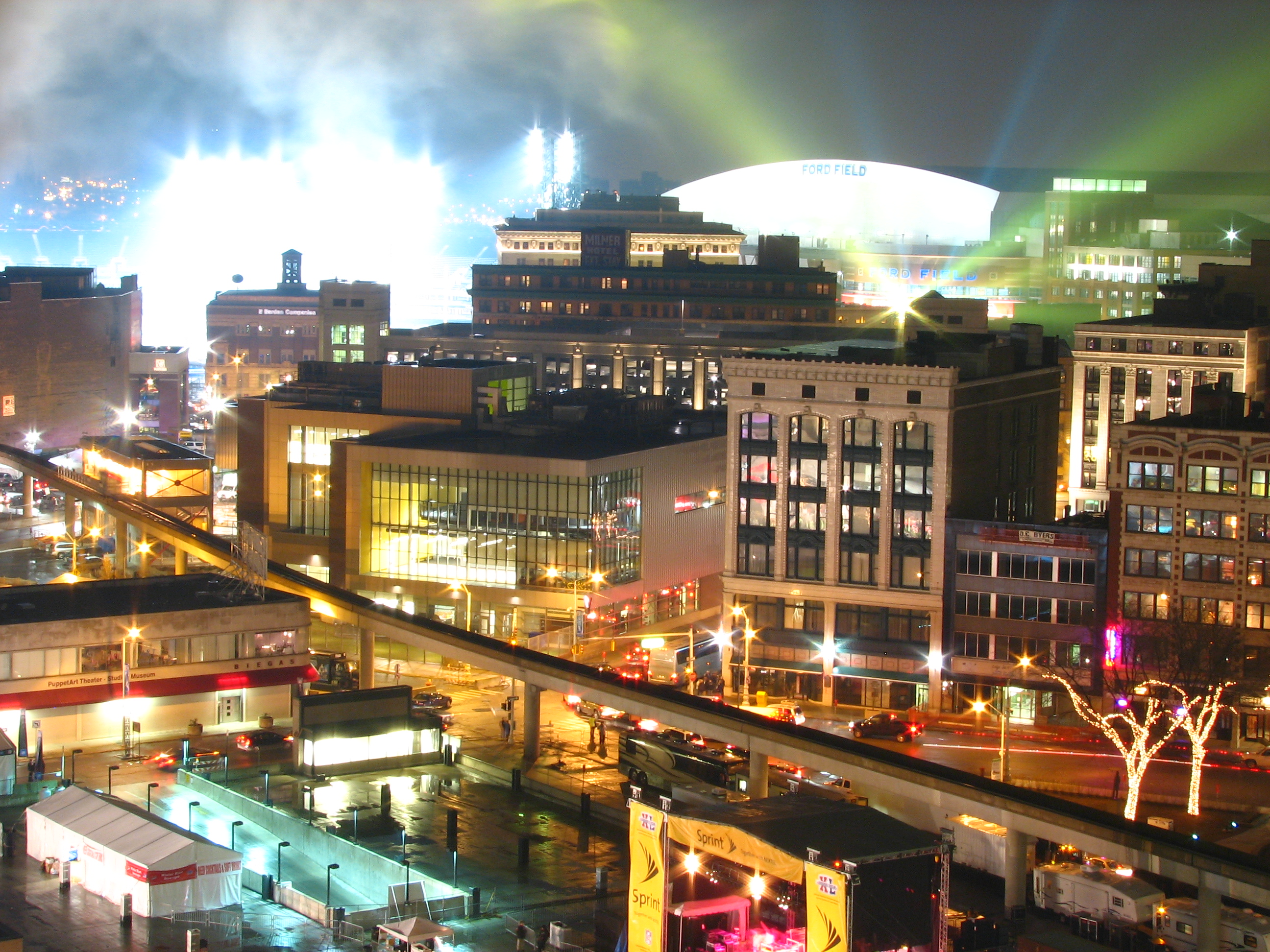
Looking toward the stadium on the night of the Super Bowl

NFL owners voted to award Super Bowl XL to Detroit during their November 1, 2000, meeting held in Atlanta. It marked the second Super Bowl held in the Detroit area, the first was XVI played at the Pontiac Silverdome in the Detroit suburb of Pontiac. Three Super Bowls host sites were selected during the meeting, XXXVIII, XXXIX, and XL. However, XXXIX was the only one of the three that involved a competitive voting process. The vote for XL was mostly a formality, as Detroit had been tentatively preselected for the game, as a reward for constructing a new stadium. The host duties, however, were contingent on satisfying a series of basic requirements. No other cities were considered for XL.

On August 20, 1996, the Lions announced their intentions to build a new stadium in downtown Detroit. NFL commissioner Paul Tagliabue helped lobby support for the project, announcing that the city of Detroit was positioned to host a Super Bowl if the stadium plans were to go forward. Despite some early mixed polls, on November 5, 1996, voters approved a tax referendum to fund the stadium construction in a landslide. Groundbreaking occurred three years later on November 16, 1999. With stadium construction underway, the NFL reaffirmed their commitment to awarding the facility a Super Bowl. By that time, host cities had been awarded, or tentatively assigned, through XXXVIII. With stiff competition from Miami, Jacksonville, and possibly Atlanta for XXXIX, Detroit set their sights on XL (February 2006). That more than satisfied the NFL's rule that required new stadiums to wait until at least their second year of operation before hosting a Super Bowl, in order to iron out any logistical issues or construction delays.

The Detroit host committee made their initial presentation on March 29, 2000, at the NFL owners meeting in Palm Beach. No other cities submitted bids for XL. The presentation was met with positive reviews. However, they had yet to secure the required number of hotel rooms, had not yet booked the venues needed for various ancillary events, and would need to install temporary seating at still-under construction Ford Field in order to meet minimum capacity. In addition, the Detroit area's previous Super Bowl (XVI), while praised for its hospitality, suffered from extreme frigid temperatures and traffic jams. Complicating the situation was the possibility of needing to utilize three casino hotels in order to achieve the required number of hotel rooms. At the time, the NFL strongly avoided any associations with gambling, however, Paul Tagliabue seemed willing to overlook that concern. The city was also saddled with a longstanding reputation of decline, urban decay, and crime – an image the city was eagerly trying to shed.

Auto racing legend and business magnate Roger Penske was hired to serve as chairman of the host committee, and he made an aggressive push over the summer of 2000 to firm up Detroit's bid. With doubts still hovering over Detroit's chances, Penske, mayor Dennis Archer, and other key members of the committee held a private meeting with the NFL owners advisory committee on September 27 to make a follow up pitch. The league set a deadline of October 11 for the final bid package submittal, or they were likely to reopen the bidding. A last minute push resolved all of the remaining hurdles. On November 1, the host committee made their final presentation at the owners' meeting Atlanta, and Detroit was overwhelmingly approved as the host for Super Bowl XL. Jerry Jones called it "outstanding...one of the best presentations that I've ever seen." Wayne Huizenga characterized it as a "slam dunk", and Bud Adams said Detroit "deserves a Super Bowl." Houston was awarded XXXVIII, and Jacksonville won the vote for XXXIX.

This would be the first Super Bowl played on the newer FieldTurf surface; each of the previous Super Bowls had been played either on natural grass or on the first-generation AstroTurf.

=== Teams ===
==== Seattle Seahawks ====
The Seahawks entered Super Bowl XL after finishing the regular season with an NFC-best 13–3 record. After a rocky 2–2 start, they won 11 consecutive games before losing to the Green Bay Packers to finish the season. The 13–3 record and 11-game winning streak set new team records.

This was the Seahawks' first Super Bowl appearance in the team's 30-year history. The Seahawks had been mediocre for much of the 1990s, recording eight consecutive non-winning seasons from 1991 through 1998. The team hit a low point in 1996, when then-owner Ken Behring announced his intention to move the team to the Los Angeles area. The team's fortunes began to turn in 1997, when Microsoft co-founder Paul Allen bought the team and brokered a deal to build a new football stadium, Qwest Field (now Lumen Field), to replace the aging Kingdome. Mike Holmgren, who had led the Green Bay Packers to Super Bowls XXXI and XXXII, became head coach in 1999. He became the fifth coach to take two franchises to the Super Bowl. Joe Jurevicius became the sixth player to play in a Super Bowl with three teams, having previously played in Super Bowl XXXV with the Giants and in Super Bowl XXXVII with the Buccaneers.

Behind running back Shaun Alexander, the Seahawks finished the 2005 season as the league's top offense, scoring 452 points. Meanwhile, Matt Hasselbeck completed 65.5 percent of his passes for 3,455 yards 24 touchdowns and nine interceptions, and added 124 yards and one touchdown on the ground. Alexander, who had scored at least 16 touchdowns in each of the previous four seasons, had the best campaign of his career, leading the league with 1,880 rushing yards and scoring an NFL record 28 touchdowns, for which he was rewarded with the NFL Most Valuable Player Award. Although the Seahawks suffered injuries to starting wide receivers Darrell Jackson and Bobby Engram throughout the season, the passing game proved potent, as Engram managed for 778 receiving yards. Joe Jurevicius, a backup when the season began, started eleven games and had for 694 receiving yards and 10 touchdowns; tight end Jerramy Stevens also emerged as a Hasselbeck target with 554 receiving yards and five touchdowns. Hasselbeck was protected and Alexander was given time to run by a stout offensive line, led by Pro Bowl offensive tackle Walter Jones, guard Steve Hutchinson, and center Robbie Tobeck, and by Pro Bowl fullback Mack Strong.

Though rookie middle linebacker Lofa Tatupu was the Seahawks' only defensive Pro Bowl selection, the Seahawks' defense recorded 50 quarterback sacks, leading the NFL in that category; defensive end Bryce Fisher led the Seahawks with 9 sacks, while defensive tackle Rocky Bernard added 8.5 and veteran defensive end Grant Wistrom recorded 4. Despite starting two rookies at linebacker for most of the year, the Seahawks' linebacking corps played well, led by Tatupu, who topped the team with 104 tackles and added 4 sacks, three interceptions, and one fumble recovery. From his strong safety position, Michael Boulware led the team with four interceptions and also tallied 2 sacks and one fumble recovery. The Seahawks secondary suffered injuries throughout the year, notably to free safety Ken Hamlin; second-year cornerback Jordan Babineaux played well as he appeared in all 16 games for the Seahawks, intercepting three passes and making 61 tackles. For the year, the defense surrendered just 271 points, 181 fewer than the Seahawks offense scored.

==== Pittsburgh Steelers ====
After a 7–5 start, the Steelers won their final four games to qualify for the playoffs with an 11–5 record. They also became the first team ever to defeat the top three seeded teams on the road in the playoffs (#3 Cincinnati Bengals, #1 Indianapolis Colts and #2 Denver Broncos). In addition, the team became the first sixth-seeded team to reach both a conference championship game and the Super Bowl since the NFL expanded to a 12-team playoff format in 1990.

Under Bill Cowher's reign as head coach since 1992, the Steelers had been one of the top teams in the NFL, making the playoffs in 10 out of his 14 seasons, advancing to the AFC Championship Game six times, and making an appearance in Super Bowl XXX, losing to the Dallas Cowboys 27–17. After having finished the 2003 season with a 6–10 record and after splitting its first two games to open 2004, the Steelers lost starting quarterback Tommy Maddox to injury. Maddox was replaced by rookie quarterback Ben Roethlisberger, who was drafted with the 11th pick in the 2004 NFL draft but was not expected to play during his rookie season. Nevertheless, Roethlisberger led the Steelers to victory in all of the team's 14 remaining regular season games, giving the Steelers a 15–1 record and making the Steelers the first AFC team ever to win 15 games. However, the Steelers lost to the eventual Super Bowl champion New England Patriots in the AFC Championship Game.

The Steelers began the 2005 season by winning seven of its first nine games, but suffered a major setback when both Roethlisberger and his backup, Charlie Batch, went down with injuries. With Maddox back as the starter, the team was defeated by the Baltimore Ravens and dropped two more games after Roethlisberger's return, falling to the then-undefeated Indianapolis Colts, and the division rival Cincinnati Bengals. The postseason hopes of the Steelers were in peril, but the team recovered to win its final four regular season games and to claim the 6th seed in the AFC playoffs.

Roethlisberger was efficient in his 12 regular season games, throwing for 2,385 yards and seventeen touchdowns with nine interceptions, while adding three rushing touchdowns. The Steelers' main receiving threat was wide receiver Hines Ward, who led the team with 975 receiving yards and 11 touchdowns. On the other side of the field, speedy wide receiver Antwaan Randle El was a constant breakaway threat with 558 receiving yards, while gaining 448 yards and two touchdowns on punt returns. Rookie tight end Heath Miller also recorded for 459 receiving yards and six touchdowns.

The Steelers' main strength on offense, however, was its running game. Running back Willie Parker was the team's leading rusher with 1,202 yards, while also recording 218 receiving yards and scoring five touchdowns. In short-yardage situations, the team relied on running back Jerome Bettis, who rushed for 368 yards and scored nine touchdowns. The 33-year-old Bettis finished his 13th NFL season as the league's fifth all-time leading rusher (13,662 yards and 91 touchdowns), but until this point he had never played in a Super Bowl. The Steelers rushing attack was powered by an offensive line led by Pro Bowl guard Alan Faneca and Pro Bowl reserve center Jeff Hartings.

The Steelers' defense ranked fourth in the NFL, giving up 284.0 total yards per game. The Steelers' defense was led by its linebacking corps: Joey Porter, James Farrior, Clark Haggans, and Larry Foote. Porter led all NFL linebackers with 10.5 quarterback sacks and also recorded two interceptions and a fumble recovery. Haggans tallied 9 sacks and 40 tackles, while Farrior added a team-high 119 tackles to go with his 2 sacks and one fumble recovery. In the secondary, free safety Chris Hope led the team with three interceptions, while Pro Bowl safety Troy Polamalu, the team's top threat in the defensive backfield, notched 91 tackles, 3 sacks, two fumble recoveries, and two interceptions.

The Steelers became just the third team to win the Super Bowl despite not playing a single home game in the playoffs. The Green Bay Packers, who won Super Bowl I (against the Kansas City Chiefs), and the Kansas City Chiefs, who won Super Bowl IV (against the Minnesota Vikings), also accomplished the feat. The Steelers, however, had to win four games to accomplish the feat, while the Chiefs won three and Packers won two games.

Of a "bridging the eras" moment, Steelers cornerback Willie Williams was the last remaining player to have been on the Steelers last Super Bowl team, their Super Bowl XXX loss to the Dallas Cowboys following the 1995 season. (Defensive backs coach Darren Perry was also a player on the Super Bowl XXX team. Both were starters in that game.) Ironically, Williams, who was in his second stint with the Steelers at the time, played with the Seahawks from 1997 to 2003. He was inactive for Super Bowl XL, which, like Bettis, turned out to be his final NFL game before retiring that offseason.

=== Statistical comparison ===
The chart below provides a comparison of regular season statistics in key categories (overall rank amongst 32 teams in parentheses).

Statistic	Seattle Seahawks	Pittsburgh Steelers
Points scored per game	28.2 (1st)	24.3 (9th)
Points allowed per game	16.9 (7th)	16.1 (3rd, tied)
Rushing yards gained per game	153.6 (3rd)	138.9 (5th)
Rushing yards allowed per game	94.4 (5th)	86.0 (3rd)
Passing yards gained per game	216.1 (13th)	182.9 (24th)
Passing yards allowed per game	222.4 (25th)	198.0 (16th)
Yards gained per play	5.8 (2nd)	5.4 (10th)
Yards allowed per play	4.9 (10th)	4.6 (3rd)
Time of possession per game	29:17 (21st)	31:16 (8th)
Third-down conversion percentage	39.6 (13th, tied)	35.4 (23rd)
Third-down conversion percentage allowed	38.0 (16th)	39.7 (20th)
Fourth-down conversion percentage	87.5 (1st)	41.7 (20th)
Fourth-down conversion percentage allowed	63.2 (26th)	35.3 (8th)
Red zone touchdown conversion percentage	71.7 (1st)	60.7 (4th, tied)
Red zone touchdown conversion percentage allowed	47.9 (10th, tied)	40.4 (2nd)
Total turnover differential	+10 (7th)	+7 (9th, tied)

=== Playoffs ===
The Steelers became the second team after the 1985 New England Patriots to win three road playoff games to reach the Super Bowl. The Steelers defeated the third-seeded Cincinnati Bengals, 31–17; the top-seeded Indianapolis Colts, 21–18 in the Immaculate Redemption/Tackle II game; and the second-seeded Denver Broncos, 34–17, in the AFC Championship Game. The Steelers also became the eighth wild-card team to go to the Super Bowl and the fourth in nine seasons. The Steelers' catchphrase for the playoffs was "One for the Thumb", a phrase originally made popular by Joe Greene as an allusion to a fifth Super Bowl ring.

In the NFC playoffs, after a first-round bye, the Seahawks defeated the sixth-seeded Washington Redskins, 20–10, before eliminating the fifth-seeded Carolina Panthers, 34–14, in the NFC Championship Game. These were the Seahawks' first playoff victories since the 1984 season when they defeated the Los Angeles Raiders 13–7, when the team was still in the AFC (the Seahawks were in that conference from 1977 to 2001).

The Seahawks were the first team to advance to the Super Bowl without playing a division champion in the playoffs, something that initially became possible in 1990 with the addition of a third wild card. As the Steelers were another wild card opponent, it created the possibility for the Seahawks to extend this run through the Super Bowl, which no team has yet done. Later the 2010 Steelers would have a similar opportunity but lose to the Packers; other teams to similarly advance faced a division champion in the Super Bowl, including the 2009 Colts (lost) and the Seahawks again in 2013 and in 2025 (both won).

=== Practice venues ===
==== Seahawks ====
The Seahawks practiced at the Detroit Lions' practice facility in Allen Park.

==== Steelers ====
The Steelers practiced at the Silverdome in Pontiac (site of Super Bowl XVI). Since the Silverdome featured Astroturf, a FieldTurf surface was temporarily installed at the venue specifically for these practices. After the Super Bowl the playing surface used for these practices was donated by the manufacturers of FieldTurf for use at Wisner Stadium, a public sports stadium in Pontiac.

=== Promotion ===
The NFL promoted this Super Bowl under the slogan "The Road to Forty." The slogan not only honored the 40-year history of the game, but was a nod to Detroit's traditional role as the center of the U.S. automotive industry. In a related note, Roger Penske, owner of a car dealership, racing team, and other related companies, headed the Super Bowl XL host committee.

The Seahawks became the first team to have their full team name painted in their end zone for a Super Bowl, as their geographic location name (Seattle) was painted above the team nickname (Seahawks). In Super Bowl XLIII, coincidentally also against the Steelers, the Arizona Cardinals became the second team to have their full team name painted in their end zone, as their geographic location name (Arizona) was painted above the team nickname (Cardinals). For all other Super Bowl teams, end zones have featured only the team nickname.

== Broadcasting ==
=== United States ===
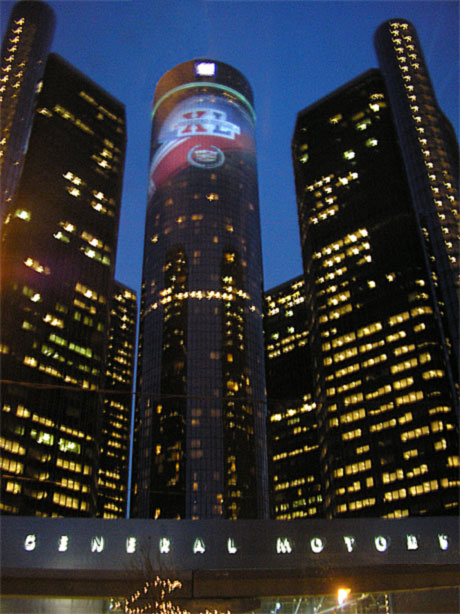
The Renaissance Center decorated for Super Bowl XL.

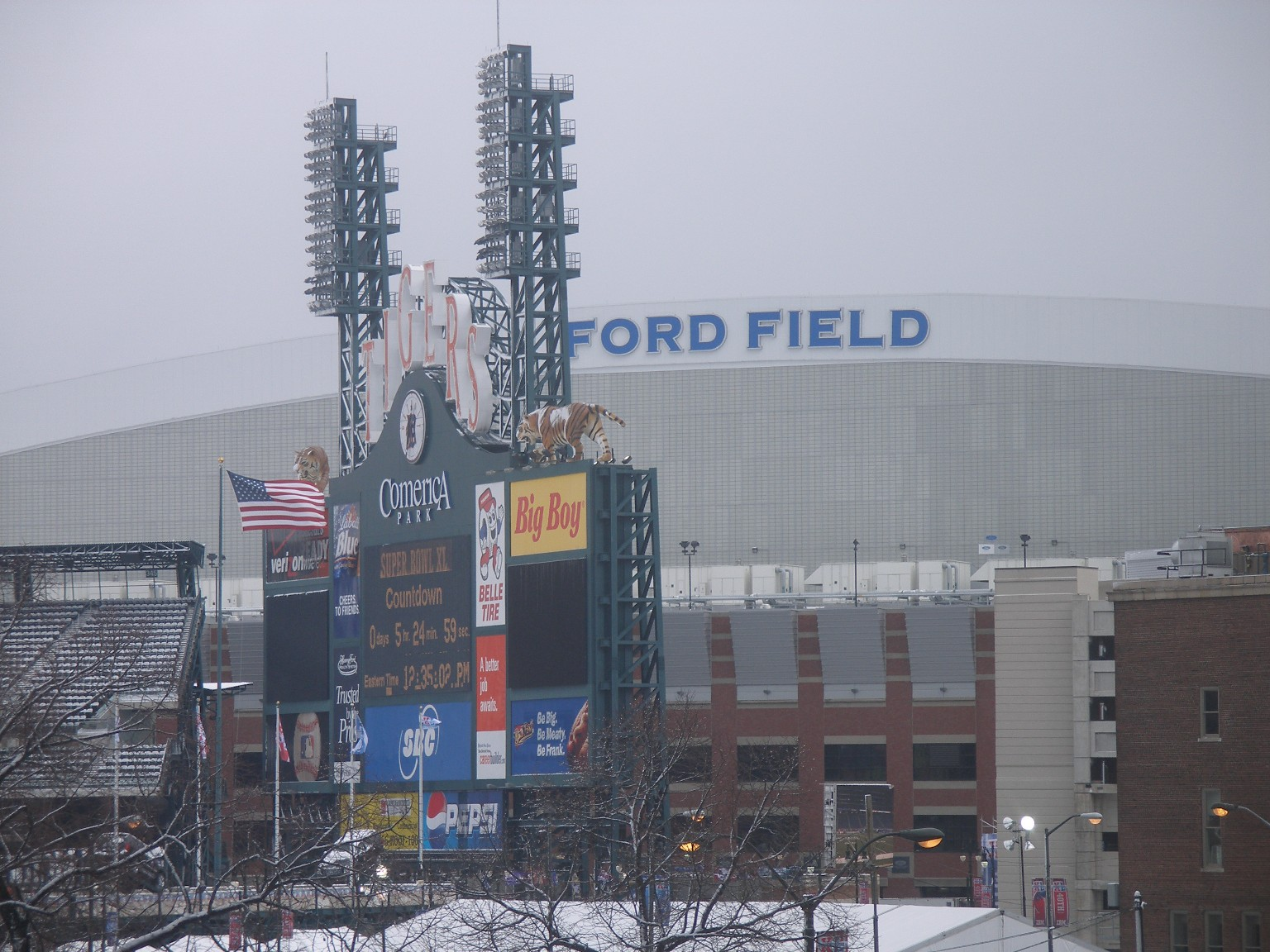
Ford Field on Super Bowl XL Sunday, countdown to kickoff on Comerica Park's score board.

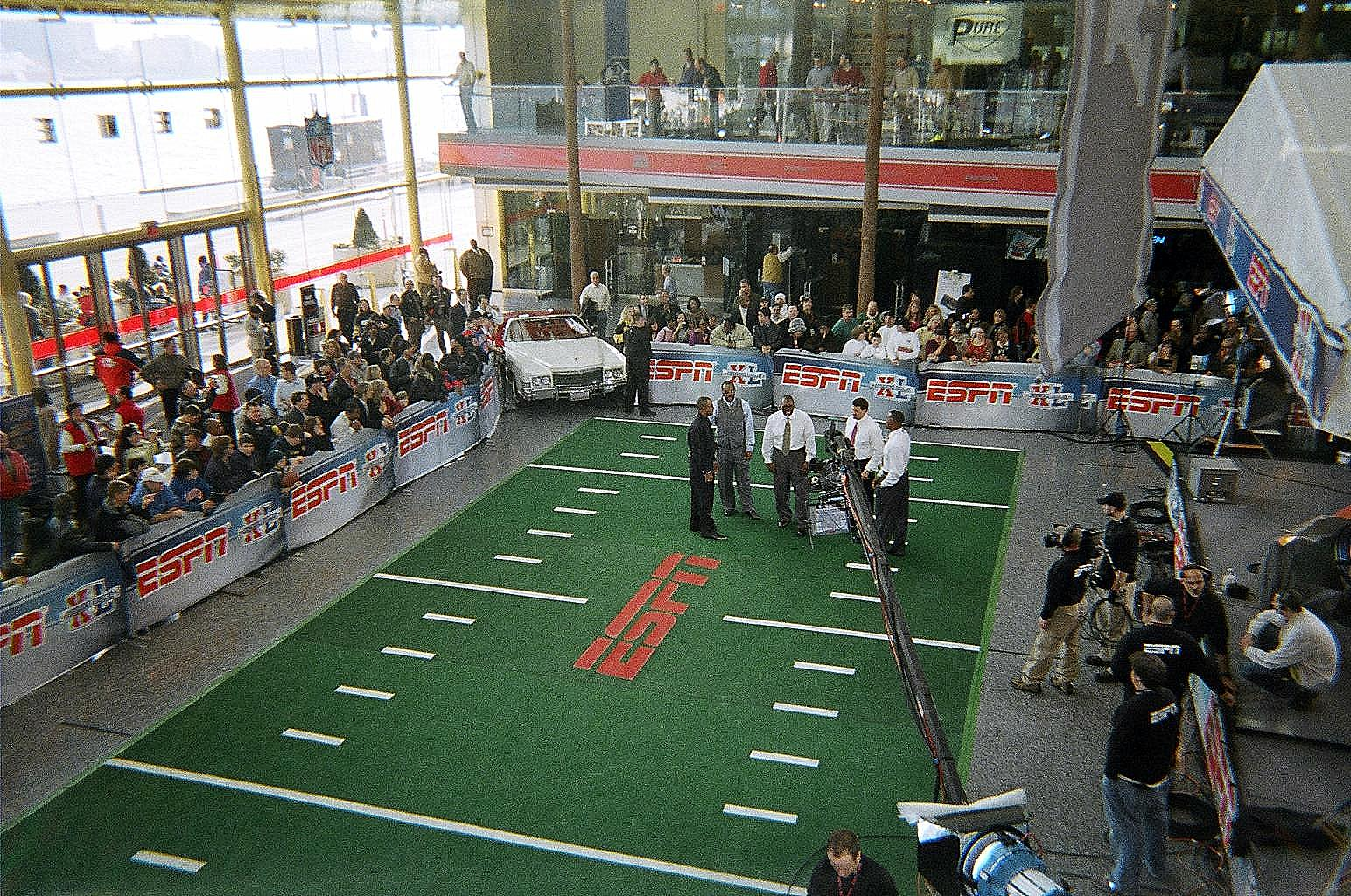
Renaissance Center Wintergarden turned into an ESPN studio for Super Bowl XL.

Super Bowl XL was televised by ABC. This was ABC's final NFL telecast before the ABC Sports division merged with sister network ESPN in September 2006 to form ESPN on ABC. And under the league's new television contracts beginning in the 2006 season, ESPN took over Monday Night Football from ABC, and NBC took over Sunday Night Football from ESPN. The NFL was then reluctant to add ESPN to the Super Bowl rotation because of the potential decrease in viewership due to the relatively limited access to cable television compared to that of an over-the-air network. The league would then allow ABC to simulcast all future ESPN-produced playoff games starting in January 2016, and select Monday Night games starting in 2020. ESPN/ABC simulcasts would finally be added to the Super Bowl rotation in 2021, with the Super Bowls in 2027 and 2031.

The telecast featured play-by-play announcer Al Michaels, color commentator John Madden, who was named the day before to the Class of 2006 by the Pro Football Hall of Fame, sideline reporters Michele Tafoya (Steelers sideline) and Suzy Kolber (Seahawks sideline). This was the sixth Super Bowl telecast for Michaels, and the tenth for Madden (whose first was Super Bowl XVI, also played in Michigan). This was also the second Super Bowl broadcast for the Michaels-Madden pairing after they had called Super Bowl XXXVII for ABC three years earlier. Madden had already signed with NBC to broadcast games for them beginning in the 2006 season; several days later Michaels, who was still under contract to ABC and ESPN, joined him in exchange for ESPN gaining partial coverage of the Ryder Cup golf tournament and The Walt Disney Company, ABC's parent, gaining all intellectual property rights to Oswald the Lucky Rabbit, a cartoon character that Walt Disney had created for Universal Pictures (NBC's corporate sibling) in the 1920s. Michaels and Madden would go on to call one more Super Bowl together, Super Bowl XLIII, after which Madden retired from broadcasting altogether.

Chris Berman, from Disney-owned corporate sibling ESPN, returned to host ABC's pregame show, as he had done for ABC's coverage of Super Bowls XXXIV and XXXVII. Berman was joined by his fellow analysts from ESPN's Sunday NFL Countdown pregame show: Michael Irvin, Tom Jackson, and Steve Young, along with co-host Mike Tirico and New England Patriots head coach (and three-time Super Bowl winner) Bill Belichick. Also contributing to the pre-game show were Tafoya, Kolber, Sam Ryan, Andrea Kremer, Kenny Mayne and Chris Mortensen.

Although the Super Bowl had largely been presented in high definition since Super Bowl XXXIV, Super Bowl XL was the first Super Bowl where all aspects of the game itself were aired in HD.

For its Super Bowl lead-out program, ABC aired the Grey's Anatomy episode "It's the End of the World".

Westwood One/CBS Radio provided national radio coverage in the United States, with the broadcasting team of Marv Albert and Boomer Esiason.

==== Advertising ====
As usual, the American television broadcast of the Super Bowl showcased top commercials and commanded high prices, estimated at $2.6 million (US) for a 30-second spot. According to Advertising Age, Anheuser-Busch was the top advertiser during the game, having purchased ten 30-second spots. The magazine reported that other companies having purchased multiple commercial segments included Ameriquest (two), CareerBuilder.com (two), Pepsi-Cola (four), Pizza Hut (ten, though most ran prior to kickoff), Sprint (three), Procter & Gamble (four, three for Gillette's new Fusion razor), Warner Bros. (three), Disney (two) and GoDaddy.com (two). Three companies aired 60-second advertisements: General Motors (for the Cadillac brand), Burger King, and Mobile ESPN (the Sports Heaven ad). Agency BBDO was the biggest single producer of commercials, creating 19. ABC also aired several 60-second commercials for some of its shows, including Lost, Desperate Housewives, and Grey's Anatomy. Notably, this was the first Super Bowl during which commercials, in addition to the game itself, were broadcast in HDTV. During typical HDTV broadcasts at the time, commercials themselves were broadcast in standard definition.

Google Video and America Online each catalogued ads for later viewing. The USA Today Super Bowl Ad Meter and ADBOWL, which both measure viewer online reaction to all Super Bowl ads, found the Bud Light "Magic refrigerator" spot ranked as the top spot.

=== International ===
The main NFL international feed of the game featured Fox broadcasters Dick Stockton and Daryl Johnston providing commentary tailored to those largely unfamiliar with the rules of American football.

Since the game was being played close to the U.S.-Canada border, Canadian television rights holders Global broadcast portions of an NFL-sponsored "Passport To The Super Bowl" event in nearby Windsor, Ontario, featuring a performance by the newly revived 1980s rock group INXS with Canadian native lead singer J.D. Fortune, though the network limited coverage of the Windsor event to short segments immediately prior to commercial breaks.

The game was also televised in Australia on (SBS and ESPN International), Austria (ORF and TW1), Brazil (ESPN International), Denmark (TV 2), Finland (MTV3), France (France 2), Germany (ARD), Hungary (Sport 1), Iceland (SÝN), Ireland (Sky Sports), Italy (Sky Sports 3 and Italia 1), Japan (NHK BS-1, NTV), Mexico (TV Azteca), Netherlands (SBS6), New Zealand (ESPN International/SKY TV), Portugal (SportTV), Slovenia (Prva TV), Spain (Canal +), Sweden (ZTV), and UK and Ireland (ITV/Sky Sports). According to the NFL, the game was available worldwide in 32 languages.

Sirius Satellite Radio and NFL.com carried international local-language broadcasts from the United Kingdom (BBC Radio 5 Live), Spain (Canal Plus Spain), Russia (NTV), Belgium (BeTV, in French), China (SMG), and Japan (NTV), in addition to the press box intercom and the public address announcer feeds.

== Entertainment ==
=== Pre-game ceremonies ===
During the pre-game ceremonies, Stevie Wonder, along with Joss Stone, India Arie, and John Legend, performed a medley of Wonder's hits. The Four Tops also performed during the pregame ceremonies, though the performance was not televised.

In honor of the fortieth Super Bowl, the pre-game ceremony featured the on-field introduction of 30 of the previous 34 Super Bowl Most Valuable Players (with the exception of Joe Montana, Terry Bradshaw, Jake Scott, and the late Harvey Martin). The absences of Montana and Bradshaw were originally reported to have been due to disagreements over appearance funds to be paid by the NFL, but each later rebutted such reports, suggesting that they had prior family commitments; Scott was reported to have been traveling through Australia. This ceremony continued a ten-year tradition (starting with Super Bowl XX and then repeated in Super Bowl XXX) in which past Super Bowl MVPs were honored before the game.

A moment of silence was observed in memory of the two civil rights activists who had died during the months prior to the game: Coretta Scott King (six days earlier) and Rosa Parks (on October 24, 2005), the latter a long-time Detroit resident.

The Steelers became the first AFC club, and only the third franchise overall, to wear white jerseys despite being the "home" team. The first two clubs, the Cowboys (Super Bowls XIII and XXVII) and the Redskins (Super Bowl XVII), traditionally wore white at home. The Denver Broncos later became the second AFC team and fourth club overall to wear white jerseys in a Super Bowl despite being the home team in Super Bowl 50. Bill Cowher stated that the Steelers were playing in Detroit, not Pittsburgh, and therefore it was not a "home" game (although 10 years earlier Cowher's Steelers did wear their black home jerseys as the designated "home" team in Super Bowl XXX at Tempe, Arizona away from Pittsburgh, where they had won both their playoff games to reach that Super Bowl). Having been the Cowboys' opponent in Super Bowl XIII, Pittsburgh also became the first team to have worn white jerseys for a "home" Super Bowl and colored jerseys for an "away" one.

The teams took the field while flanked on either side by flags bearing the names of all previous Super Bowl MVPs. Although the participating teams each entered as a team for their introduction, the Steelers insisted on sending Jerome Bettis out ahead of the rest of the team in front of his hometown crowd.

R&B singers Aaron Neville and Detroit native Aretha Franklin, accompanied by pianist Dr. John and a 150-member choir, performed the national anthem as part of a pre-game tribute to New Orleans, a nine-time Super Bowl host city then in the midst of efforts to rebuild in the wake of Hurricane Katrina. The national anthem was performed in American Sign Language by Angela LaGuardia, a teacher at Michigan School for the Deaf.

Tom Brady, MVP of Super Bowls XXXVI and XXXVIII, became the first active player to participate in a Super Bowl coin toss, the result of which toss was tails, as selected by Seattle.

=== Halftime show ===
The Rolling Stones performed during the halftime show, which was sponsored by the American telecommunications company Sprint. The group performed three songs: "Start Me Up", "Rough Justice", and "(I Can't Get No) Satisfaction". The show was viewed by 89.9 million people.

=== Post-game ceremonies ===
The post-game presentation saw Bart Starr, the MVP of Super Bowls I and II, take the Vince Lombardi Trophy to the podium, whence it was presented to Steelers owner Dan Rooney.

== Game summary ==
=== First half ===
After the first four possessions of the Super Bowl XL ended with punts, Seahawks punt returner Peter Warrick gave his team good field position by returning Chris Gardocki's 37-yard punt 12 yards to the Seahawks' 49-yard line. Quarterback Matt Hasselbeck then started off the drive with a pair of completions to receivers Darrell Jackson and Joe Jurevicius for gains of 20 and 11 yards, respectively. On the third play of the drive, Jackson caught a pass in the end-zone, apparently for a touchdown, but the play was nullified as Jackson was called for pass interference. Running back Shaun Alexander ran the ball the next two plays but gained only three yards. Hasselbeck's third-down pass attempt fell incomplete, and the Seahawks were forced to settle for a 47-yard field goal by kicker Josh Brown, which was successful. By the end of the first quarter, the Steelers had failed to gain a first down, and quarterback Ben Roethlisberger had completed one of five pass attempts for one yard. On their first second-quarter possession, the Steelers once more was forced to punt after three plays, but benefited from another Seahawks penalty, a holding call that nullified Warrick's 34-yard punt return. The Steelers forced a Seahawks punt, but Seahawks safety Michael Boulware intercepted a Roethlisberger pass at the Seahawks' 17-yard line on the ensuing drive. The Seahawks, though, were once more forced to punt after three plays, and the Steelers drove into Seahawks territory on the following drive. An offensive pass interference call against tight end Heath Miller and a sack for an eight-yard loss by Seahawks defensive end Grant Wistrom, though, backed the Steelers to the 40-yard line, and left the team facing a third-down-and-28. However, Roethlisberger hit wide receiver Hines Ward out of a scramble and extremely unorthodox, against the grain pass for a 37-yard gain to give the team the longest third down conversion in Super Bowl history. Jerome Bettis carried the ball on the next two plays, taking his team to the one-yard line but not into the end-zone. On the third-down play, after the two-minute warning, Roethlisberger faked a hand-off and dove into the end-zone himself. There was some confusion as to whether or not he had scored, since the referee hesitated for a bit after the play ended, but he eventually signaled a touchdown, and it was upheld after a replay challenge. On the strength of a 19-yard Jurevicius reception, the Seahawks advanced the ball to the Pittsburgh 36-yard line, but, after the drive stalled, Brown missed a 54-yard field goal attempt to the right and the Steelers ran out the clock to end the first half.

=== Second half ===
The Steelers took the ball to begin the second half, and just two plays in, running back Willie Parker broke through for a 75-yard touchdown run, giving his team a 14–3 lead and setting a record for the longest run in Super Bowl history, beating Marcus Allen's Super Bowl XVIII mark by one yard. The Seahawks drove into Steelers territory on the next drive, sparked by a 21-yard run by Alexander, but Brown again missed a field-goal attempt, this one from 50 yards, as the Seahawks were unable to close the 11-point deficit. The Steelers drove 54 yards to the Seahawks' 6-yard line to put themselves in position to take a large lead, but Seahawks defensive back Kelly Herndon intercepted a pass from Roethlisberger and returned it a Super Bowl record 76 yards to the Steelers' 20-yard line. Herndon's interception remains as of 2024, the longest non-scoring play in Super Bowl history. From there, the Seahawks required just two plays to score on Hasselbeck's 16-yard touchdown pass to tight end Jerramy Stevens, cutting their deficit to 14–10. The teams exchanged punts (two from the Steelers, one from the Seahawks) to fill out most of the third quarter, but the Seahawks ended the quarter having driven from their own two-yard line to near midfield. The drive continued in the fourth quarter, as the Seahawks reached the Steelers' 19-yard line. An 18-yard pass to Stevens, though, was negated on a penalty call against Seahawks tackle Sean Locklear for holding, denying the Seahawks an opportunity for a first-down-and-goal from the 1-yard-line. Three plays later, Steelers defensive back Ike Taylor intercepted a Hasselbeck pass at the 5-yard line and returned it 24 yards. While tackling Taylor, Hasselbeck dove low and was flagged for blocking below the waist. The penalty added 15 yards to the return and gave the Steelers the ball on their own 44-yard line. Four plays later, the Steelers ran a wide receiver reverse, but the play turned out to be a pass play by wide receiver Antwaan Randle El, who played quarterback while in college. Parker took a pitch from Roethlisberger and handed off to Randle El, who was running in the opposite direction. Randle El then pulled up and threw a 43-yard touchdown pass to a wide-open Ward, giving the Steelers a 21–10 lead and also marking the first time a wide receiver threw a touchdown pass in a Super Bowl. On the ensuing possession, Hasselbeck ran the ball for eighteen yards and was briefly touched by Steelers linebacker Larry Foote as Hasselbeck fell to the ground. Though the play was initially ruled a fumble, with the ball recovered by the Steelers, a Seahawks challenge proved successful, as officials ruled Hasselbeck to have been down prior to his having lost the ball, the Seahawks, aided by a 13-yard Jurevicius reception, drove to the Steelers' 48-yard line but could go no further; a Tom Rouen punt entered the end zone, giving the Steelers possession on their own 20-yard line. The Steelers possessed the ball for nearly four-and-one-half minutes on the ensuing drive, as Bettis carried seven times, the Seahawks were forced to use all of its three timeouts to stop the clock, but nevertheless had only 1:51 left when it took the ball from its own 20-yard line following a Gardocki punt. A 35-yard reception by Jurevicius took the Seahawks into Steelers territory, and a 13-yard Bobby Engram reception took the team to within field-goal range, but dubious clock-management and play-calling left the team with just 35 seconds remaining; an incompletion and a three-yard pass to Stevens over the middle of the field consumed 26 seconds, and Hasselbeck threw incomplete near Stevens on fourth down, giving the Steelers the ball on downs with just three seconds remaining, after which a Roethlisberger kneel-down ended the game.

=== Box score ===
Super Bowl XL: Pittsburgh Steelers 21, Seattle Seahawks 10

Quarter	1	2	3	4	Total
Seahawks (NFC)	3	0	7	0	10
Steelers (AFC)	0	7	7	7	21

at Ford Field, Detroit, Michigan

- Date: February 5, 2006
- Game time: 6:27 p.m. EST
- Game weather: 30 °F (−1 °C) (outdoors), 68 °F (20 °C) (indoors), game played indoors, domed stadium
- Game attendance: 68,206
- Referee: Bill Leavy
- TV announcers (ABC): Al Michaels, John Madden, Michele Tafoya and Suzy Kolber
- Recap at the Wayback Machine (archived June 15, 2006)

Scoring summary

Quarter	Time	Drive			Team	Scoring information	Score	
Quarter	Time	Plays	Yards	TOP	Team	Scoring information	SEA	PIT
1	0:22	7	22	3:39	SEA	47-yard field goal by Josh Brown	3	0
2	1:55	11	59	6:20	PIT	Ben Roethlisberger 1-yard touchdown run, Jeff Reed kick good	3	7
3	14:38	2	75	0:22	PIT	Willie Parker 75-yard touchdown run, Reed kick good	3	14
3	6:45	3	20	0:53	SEA	Jerramy Stevens 16-yard touchdown reception from Matt Hasselbeck, Brown kick good	10	14
4	8:56	4	56	1:50	PIT	Hines Ward 43-yard touchdown reception from Antwaan Randle El, Reed kick good	10	21
"TOP" = time of possession. For other American football terms, see Glossary of American football.							10	21

=== Statistical overview ===
The Steelers became just the third team to win the Super Bowl despite not playing a home game in the playoffs. The Green Bay Packers, who won Super Bowl I, and the Kansas City Chiefs, who won Super Bowl IV, also accomplished the feat. The Steelers, however, had to win four games to accomplish the feat, while the Chiefs won three and Packers won only two games. The Packers and Chiefs were also victims of a rotational system, where the home team would switch by division each year.

Roethlisberger finished the game having completed just 9 of 21 passes for 123 yards and having also thrown two interceptions; his 22.6 quarterback rating was the lowest ever by a Super Bowl winning quarterback. He also rushed for 25 yards and a touchdown. He became the second youngest quarterback to start in a Super Bowl and the youngest quarterback ever to win a Super Bowl at 23 years, 11 months.

The Steelers' rushing game was paced by Willie Parker, who gained 93 yards and one touchdown on ten carries, Bettis rushed 14 times for 43 yards, converted a key first down, and allowed his team to run time off the clock late in the fourth quarter. Ward caught five passes for 123 yards and a touchdown. In addition to his 43-yard touchdown pass, Randle El caught three passes for 22 yards and returned two punts for 32 yards.

In defeat for the Seahawks, Hasselbeck completed 26 of 49 pass attempts for 273 yards and a touchdown, with one interception. Jurevicius caught 5 passes for 93 yards. Engram and Jackson also played roles, combining to gain 120 yards on eleven receptions. Alexander led all rushers in the game, accumulating 95 yards on 20 carries while also catching two passes for two yards. The Steelers were the third team to lose the turnover battle and win the game, after the Baltimore Colts in Super Bowl V and the Steelers in Super Bowl XIV.

Defensively, Taylor led the Steelers, making seven tackles, defensing two passes, and intercepting Hasselbeck; for the Seahawks, linebacker Lofa Tatupu recorded nine tackles.

== Final statistics ==
Sources: NFL.com Super Bowl XL, Super Bowl XL Play Finder Pit, Super Bowl XL Play Finder Sea

=== Statistical comparison ===
Statistic	Seattle Seahawks	Pittsburgh Steelers
First downs	20	14
First downs rushing	5	6
First downs passing	15	8
First downs penalty	0	0
Third down efficiency	5/17	8/15
Fourth down efficiency	1/2	0/0
Net yards rushing	137	181
Rushing attempts	25	33
Yards per rush	5.5	5.5
Passing – Completions-attempts	26/49	10/22
Times sacked-total yards	3–14	1–8
Interceptions thrown	1	2
Net yards passing	259	158
Total net yards	396	339
Punt returns-total yards	4–27	2–32
Kickoff returns-total yards	4–71	2–43
Interceptions-total return yards	2–76	1–24
Punts-average yardage	6–50.2	6–48.7
Fumbles-lost	0–0	0–0
Penalties-yards	7–70	3–20
Time of possession	33:02	26:58
Turnovers	1	2

=== Individual leaders ===
Seahawks passing
	C/ATT^{1}	Yds	TD	INT	Rating
Matt Hasselbeck	26/49	273	1	1	67.8
Seahawks rushing
	Car^{2}	Yds	TD	LG^{3}	Yds/Car
Shaun Alexander	20	95	0	21	4.75
Matt Hasselbeck	3	35	0	18	11.67
Mack Strong	2	7	0	7	3.50
Seahawks receiving
	Rec^{4}	Yds	TD	LG^{3}	Target^{5}
Bobby Engram	6	70	0	21	9
Joe Jurevicius	5	93	0	35	8
Darrell Jackson	5	50	0	20	12
Jerramy Stevens	3	25	1	16t	8
Mack Strong	2	15	0	13	3
Ryan Hannam	2	12	0	9	2
Shaun Alexander	2	2	0	4	4
Maurice Morris	1	6	0	6	1
D. J. Hackett	0	0	0	0	1

Steelers passing
	C/ATT^{1}	Yds	TD	INT	Rating
Ben Roethlisberger	9/21	123	0	2	22.6
Antwaan Randle El	1/1	43	1	0	158.3
Steelers rushing
	Car^{2}	Yds	TD	LG^{3}	Yds/Car
Willie Parker	10	93	1	75t	9.30
Jerome Bettis	14	43	0	12	3.07
Ben Roethlisberger	7	25	1	10	3.57
Hines Ward	1	18	0	18	18.00
Verron Haynes	1	2	0	2	2.00
Steelers receiving
	Rec^{4}	Yds	TD	LG^{3}	Target^{5}
Hines Ward	5	123	1	43t	11
Antwaan Randle El	3	22	0	8	5
Cedrick Wilson	1	20	0	20	3
Willie Parker	1	1	0	1	1
Nate Washington	0	0	0	0	1
Jerame Tuman	0	0	0	0	1

^{1}Completions/attempts ^{2}Carries ^{3}Long gain ^{4}Receptions ^{5}Times targeted

== Starting lineups ==
Hall of Fame‡

Seattle	Position	Position	Pittsburgh
Offense
Bobby Engram	WR		Antwaan Randle El
Walter Jones‡	LT		Marvel Smith
Steve Hutchinson‡	LG		Alan Faneca‡
Robbie Tobeck	C		Jeff Hartings
Chris Gray	RG		Kendall Simmons
Sean Locklear	RT		Max Starks
Joe Jurevicius	WR	TE	Heath Miller
Darrell Jackson	WR		Hines Ward
Matt Hasselbeck	QB		Ben Roethlisberger
Mack Strong	FB		Dan Kreider
Shaun Alexander	RB		Willie Parker
Defense
Bryce Fisher	LDE	DE	Aaron Smith
Chartric Darby	LDT	NT	Casey Hampton
Rocky Bernard	RDT	DE	Kimo von Oelhoffen
Grant Wistrom	RDE	LOLB	Clark Haggans
Leroy Hill	OLB	LILB	James Farrior
Lofa Tatupu	MLB	RILB	Larry Foote
D. D. Lewis	OLB	ROLB	Joey Porter
Andre Dyson	LCB		Ike Taylor
Marcus Trufant	RCB		Deshea Townsend
Michael Boulware	SS		Troy Polamalu‡
Marquand Manuel	FS		Chris Hope

== Officials ==
- Referee: Bill Leavy #127 second Super Bowl (XXXIV as back judge)
- Umpire: Garth DeFelice #53 first Super Bowl on field (alternate for XXXIX)
- Head linesman: Mark Hittner #28 third Super Bowl (XXXVI and XXXVIII)
- Line judge: Mark Perlman #9 first Super Bowl
- Side judge: Tom Hill #97 first Super Bowl
- Field judge: Steve Zimmer #33 first Super Bowl
- Back judge: Bob Waggoner #25 first Super Bowl
- Replay official: Bob Boylston
- Video operator: David Coleman

=== Reaction to officiating ===
The officiating in Super Bowl XL was met with criticism from members of the media soon after the game. One call that was complained about was an offensive pass interference on Seahawks wide receiver Darrell Jackson for a push-off against Steelers safety Chris Hope that nullified his 16-yard touchdown reception in the first quarter. However, according to the NFL's Director of Officiating at the time, Mike Pereira, the call was indeed correct as Jackson had pushed off.

Another complaint had to do with a penalty in the fourth quarter against Seahawks right tackle Sean Locklear for holding Steelers linebacker Clark Haggans that nullified a deep pass. Pereira later stated that Locklear was definitively holding and the call was correct. Also disputed was the penalty on Hasselbeck for an illegal block below the waist while making a tackle during Ike Taylor's interception return.

In addition, many Steelers fans were outraged by an incomplete pass call early in the game from Hasselbeck to Jerramy Stevens. Stevens appeared to have possession and then fumble, only for the officials to rule he never had complete possession. The Steelers also were upset about a call on a play that appeared to give them possession of the football when Matt Hasselbeck fumbled while scrambling. It was ruled however that Hasselbeck had been touched before losing control of the football, thus negating the fumble.

Kansas City Star writer Jason Whitlock encapsulated some views when he wrote the day after the game, "Bill Leavy and his crew ruined Super Bowl XL. Am I the only one who would like to hear them defend their incompetence?" Initially, some fans reacted negatively as well. A February 7 online ESPN poll found that, with 103,167 votes cast, 61.7% of those votes were cast for the choice of "officiating mistakes affected the outcome of Super Bowl XL." Seahawks head coach Mike Holmgren himself took issue with the officiating at a rally for his team on February 6 at Qwest Field, saying, "We knew it was going to be tough going against the Pittsburgh Steelers. I didn't know we were going to have to play the guys in the striped shirts as well."

In response to the criticisms leveled at the officials, the NFL, just two days after the game, released a statement defending the officials' performance. "The game was properly officiated, including, as in most NFL games, some tight plays that produced disagreement about the calls made by the officials", NFL spokesman Greg Aiello said in a statement.

High-profile referee Ed Hochuli said "The Super Bowl was one of those games where it seemed the big calls went against Seattle. And that was just fortuitous—bad fortuitous for Seattle." Hochuli went on to say that "The league felt, actually, that the Super Bowl was well officiated. Now, that doesn't mean there were no mistakes. There are always mistakes, but it was a well-officiated game."

On August 6, 2010, while visiting the Seahawks' preseason training camp for an annual rules interpretation session with the Seattle media, Leavy brought up Super Bowl XL without being asked, and said:

It was a tough thing for me. I kicked two calls in the fourth quarter and I impacted the game, and as an official you never want to do that. It left me with a lot of sleepless nights, and I think about it constantly. I'll go to my grave wishing that I'd been better ... I know that I did my best at that time, but it wasn't good enough ... When we make mistakes, you got to step up and own them. It's something that all officials have to deal with, but unfortunately when you have to deal with it in the Super Bowl it's difficult.

The Super Bowl XL officiating controversy was later listed as number 8 on the NFL's list of the top ten controversial calls of all time. Commentators Boomer Esiason, Steve Raible, and Tom Curran were critical of the officiating, while former Steelers wide receiver Hines Ward and commentator Ed Bouchette defended the calls, and commentators Howard Balzer and Bill Hillgrove and former Steelers defensive coordinator Dick LeBeau felt that the officiating did not impact the outcome of the game.

== Gambling ==
- According to Las Vegas oddsmakers, the Steelers opened betting as a four-point favorite. As the Steelers won by eleven points, they covered this spread.
- The over-under, or expected points total, for the game, opened at 47. As the total combined score of this game was only 31 points, the under bet won.
- The money line was set at roughly +160 for the Seahawks and −180 for the Steelers.

This was just the fifth time in Super Bowl history when a lower-seeded team opened as the favorite to win; the previous occurrences were Super Bowls XXXIX (AFC second-seeded New England Patriots were favored by seven points over NFC top-seed Philadelphia Eagles), XXXV (AFC fourth-seeded Baltimore Ravens were favored by three points over NFC top-seed New York Giants), XXIII (NFC second-seeded San Francisco 49ers were favored by seven points over AFC first-seed Cincinnati Bengals), and XVII (AFC second-seeded Miami Dolphins were favored by three points over NFC top-seed Washington Redskins). In each but the last iteration, the lower-seeded and favored team won.

This was also the second time in Super Bowl history when the favorite was a wild card team, the first was before Super Bowl XXXV, when the Ravens were favored. It also marked the first time since that game the favorite won against the spread.

Members of the winning team each received a payment of $73,000 for playing in the game, while players on the losing team were paid $38,000. The Green Bay Packers received $15,000 each for winning Super Bowl I in 1967; adjusted for inflation in 2006 dollars, that sum is roughly $86,000.

After having held constant at $600 for three years, the face value of the costliest Super Bowl ticket rose to $700 for the game. On eBay, the least-desirable seats—those behind each end zone in the upper level—fetched more than $2,000 each, while top seats around the 50-yard line sold for more than $6,000.

== Ring ==
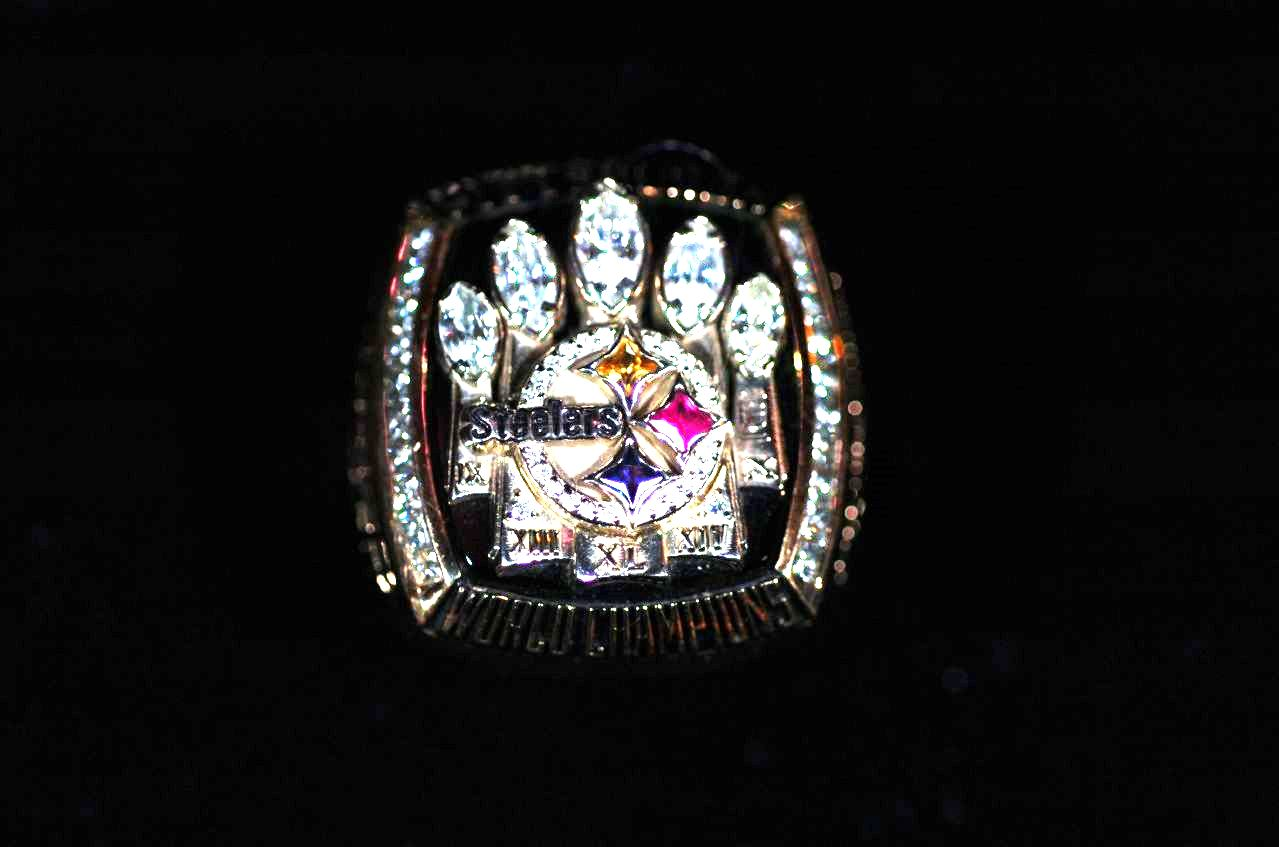
The Steelers Super Bowl XL ring

The ring for the Pittsburgh Steelers was designed by Steelers owner Dan Rooney with Jerome Bettis and Ben Roethlisberger. It is crowned by five Vince Lombardi trophies, all topped with football-shaped diamond settings to represent their five Super Bowl victories. Rooney would have preferred the ring to focus exclusively on this team's win, but Bettis and Roethlisberger, cognizant of a tradition of which they couldn't help but be reminded, insisted that it acknowledge the legacy of all those teams (indeed, during the pre-game MVP introductions, Franco Harris, winner of the award in the Steelers' first Super Bowl IX victory 31 years earlier on January 12, 1975, had waved a Terrible Towel as he walked onto the field).

The base of each trophy has the Roman numeral for their victories, with Super Bowl XL front and center. In front of the trophies is the Steelers logo set with colored jewels to mimic the colors of the logo. On the top of the crown is "PITTSBURGH", and on the bottom is "WORLD CHAMPIONS". Each side of the crown has 10 square cut diamonds channel set along the edge. The left side of the ring has the player's name and number with the NFL logo in between, while the right side has the score of the game (Steelers 21 Seahawks 10) above the Super Bowl XL logo over 2005. The year on the ring is for the NFL season, and not the year the game was played.

The Super Bowl XL rings were produced by the Minneapolis-based jewelry company Jostens, which is the primary supplier of Super Bowl champion rings and has made 31 rings in the Super Bowl's 50-year history through 2017. The National Football League covers the cost of 150 rings, paying up to $5,000 for each (three quarters of a million dollars). If a team wants a fancier look, such as player names, more gems or detailed designs, or more than 150 rings, then the team owner has to foot the bill for the extra cost.
