= Edmund Nelson (American football) =

American football player (born 1960)

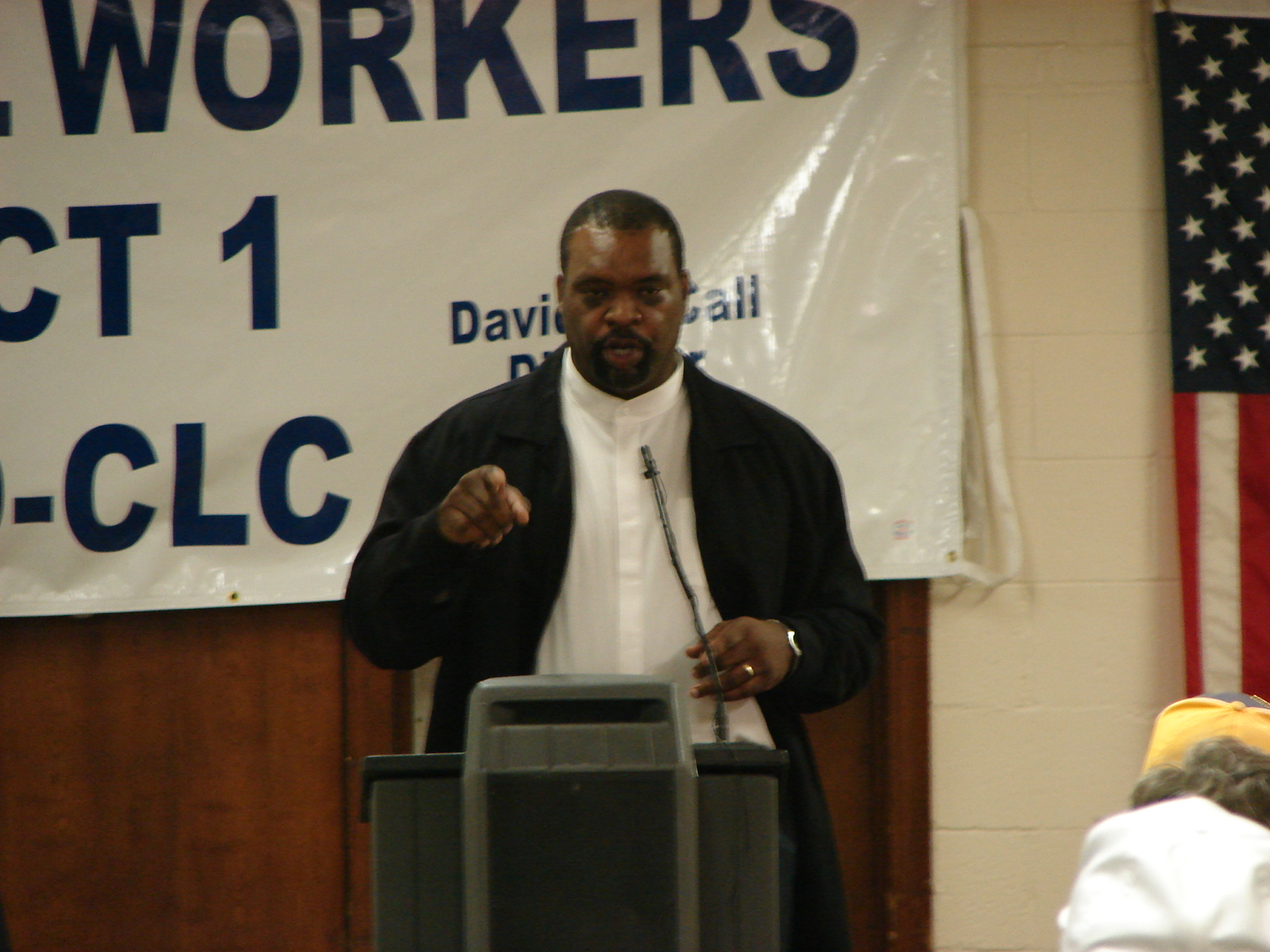
- Nelson stumping for Barack Obama in Ohio in 2008

No. 64, 65
- Positions: Defensive end, defensive tackle, nose tackle

Personal information
- Born: April 30, 1960 (age 66); Live Oak, Florida, U.S.
- Listed height: 6 ft 3 in (1.91 m)
- Listed weight: 272 lb (123 kg)

Career information
- High school: C. Leon King (Tampa, Florida)
- College: Auburn
- NFL draft: 1982: 7th round, 172nd overall pick

Career history
- Pittsburgh Steelers (1982–1987); New Orleans Saints (1988)*; New England Patriots (1988)
- * Offseason or practice squad member only

Awards and highlights
- Second-team All-SEC (1981); Cliff Hare Award (1981); Shug Jordan Award (1981)

Career NFL statistics
- Sacks: 16
- Fumble recoveries: 4
- Stats at Pro Football Reference

Edmund Clau-Von Nelson (born April 30, 1960) is an American former professional football player who was a defensive lineman in the National Football League (NFL) for seven seasons for the Pittsburgh Steelers and New England Patriots. He played college football for the Auburn Tigers.

Edmund served as the color analyst for Pittsburgh Steelers pre-season games and participated as a co-host to Bob Pompeani in KDKA-TV's regular season pre-game program Steelers Kickoff until retiring in 2015. He also owns an insurance agency located in the Pittsburgh area.
