= 1991 Pittsburgh Steelers season =

NFL team season

- Owner: The Rooney family
- General manager: Tom Donahoe
- Head coach: Chuck Noll
- Offensive coordinator: Joe Walton
- Defensive coordinator: Dave Brazil
- Home stadium: Three Rivers Stadium

Results
- Record: 7–9
- Division place: 2nd AFC Central
- Playoffs: Did not qualify
- All-Pros: None
- Pro Bowlers: 2: OLB Greg Lloyd; CB Rod Woodson
- Team MVP: Greg Lloyd
- Team ROY: Adrian Cooper

The 1991 Pittsburgh Steelers season was the franchise's 59th season as a professional sports franchise and as a member of the National Football League (NFL).

The Steelers struggled early as Neil O'Donnell took over from Bubby Brister at quarterback. The Steelers ended the season winning their last two games, 17–10, over the Cincinnati Bengals and Cleveland Browns at Three Rivers Stadium to finish with a 7–9 record. Following the season Chuck Noll announced his retirement, ending his 23-year career in which he won four Super Bowls while posting an overall record of 209–156–1.

== Offseason ==
=== NFL draft ===
1991 Pittsburgh Steelers draft
Round	Pick	Player	Position	College	Notes
1	17	Huey Richardson	Defensive end	Florida	
2	46	Jeff Graham	Wide receiver	Ohio State	
3	73	Ernie Mills	Wide receiver	Florida	
4	88	Sammy Walker	Cornerback	Texas Tech	
4	103	Adrian Cooper	Tight end	Oklahoma	
6	158	Leroy Thompson	Running back	Penn State	
7	185	Andre Jones	Linebacker	Notre Dame	
8	212	Dean Dingman	Guard	Michigan	
9	238	Bruce McGonnigal	Tight end	Virginia	
10	269	Ariel Solomon	Tackle	Colorado	
11	296	Efrum Thomas	Defensive back	Alabama	
12	323	Jeff Brady	Linebacker	Kentucky	
Made roster

=== Undrafted free agents ===
1991 undrafted free agents of note
Player	Position	College
Mike Bernard	Guard	Syracuse
Ricky Byrd	Guard	Mississippi State
Scott Davis	Running back	North Texas
Rich Drayton	Wide receiver	Temple
Randy Holleran	Linebacker	Kentucky
Fernando Horn	Defensive Lineman	Auburn
Garry Howe	Defensive tackle	Colorado
Jarrod Johnson	Center	Lehigh
Brian LeBaron	Linebacker	Syracuse
Sam Mannery	Quarterback	California (PA)
Ken Rock	Running back	IUP
Kevin Smith	Safety	Rhode Island
Shawn Vincent	Cornerback	Akron
Jeff Walker	Tight end	Rice

== Personnel ==
=== Coaches / Staff ===
1991 Pittsburgh Steelers staff
Front office: President – Daniel M. Rooney; Vice president – John R. McGinley; Vice president – Arthur J. Rooney, Jr.; Director of communications – Joe Gordon; Controller – Dan McGrogan; Assistant controller - business – Dan Ferens; Public relations director – Dan Edwards; Community relations coordinator – Ron Miller; Ticket sales manager – Geraldine Glenn; Assistant controller - office – Jim Ellenberger; Director of player personnel – Dick Haley; Director of football development – Tom Donahoe; Football business manager – James A. Boston; College scouting coordinator – Tom Modrak; Talent scout – Bob Schmitz; Talent scout – Max McCartney; Talent scout – Charles Bailey; Talent scout – Bob Lane; Head coaches: Head coach – Chuck Noll; Offensive coaches: Offensive coordinator – Joe Walton; Offensive backfield – Dick Hoak; Receivers – Dwain Painter; Tight ends – Jon Kolb; Offensive line – Ron Blackledge; Offensive line – Jack Henry	Defensive coaches: Defensive coordinator – Dave Brazil; Defensive line – Joe Greene; Linebackers – Bob Valesente; Defensive backs – John Fox; Special teams coaches: Special teams coach – George Stewart; Strength and conditioning: Conditioning coach – Jon Kolb; Dentist – Dr. George P. Boucek; Ophthalmologist – Dr. Phillip Buzzelli; Physician, orthopedic – Dr. Thomas W. Cowan; Neurological surgery consultant – Dr. Joseph C. Maroon; Physician, M.D. – Dr. Richard Rydze; Physician, consultant – Dr. Abraham J.Twerski; Physician, M.D. – Dr. Anthony P. Yates; Administrative trainer - Ralph Berlin; Head trainer – John Norwig; Equipment manager – Anthony Parisi; Field manager – Rodgers Freyvogel; Video & film director – Bob McCartney; Video assistant – Pat Dolan; Photographers – Mike Fabus, Bill Amatucci

Notable additions include Adrian Cooper, Neil O'Donnell and Ernie Mills.

=== Final roster ===
1991 Pittsburgh Steelers roster
Quarterbacks (QB): 6 Bubby Brister; 14 Neil O'Donnell; 11 Rick Strom; Running backs (RB): 33 Merril Hoge FB; 34 Leroy Thompson; 42 Warren Williams; 38 Tim Worley; Wide receivers (WR): 81 Jeff Graham PR; 83 Louis Lipps; 89 Ernie Mills KR; 20 Dwight Stone; Tight ends (TE): 85 Keith Cash; 87 Adrian Cooper	Offensive linemen (OL): 61 Dean Caliguire G/C; 63 Dermontti Dawson C; 77 Carlton Haselrig G; 62 Tunch Ilkin T; 65 John Jackson T; 74 Terry Long G; 69 Ariel Solomon G/T; 73 Justin Strzelczyk G/T; Defensive linemen (DL): 64 Kenny Davidson DE; 66 Donald Evans DE; 97 Aaron Jones DE; 91 Craig Veasey NT; 98 Gerald Williams NT; 93 Keith Willis DE	Linebackers (LB): 94 Jeff Brady ILB; 53 Bryan Hinkle OLB; 50 David Little ILB; 95 Greg Lloyd OLB; 56 Rob McGovern ILB; 54 Hardy Nickerson ILB; 55 Jerry Olsavsky ILB; 90 Huey Richardson OLB; 57 Jerrol Williams OLB; Defensive backs (DB): 27 Thomas Everett FS; 44 D. J. Johnson CB; 25 Gary Jones FS; 37 Carnell Lake SS; 24 Richard Shelton CB/S; 41 Kevin Smith SS; 43 Shawn Vincent CB; 23 Sammy Walker CB; 26 Rod Woodson CB; Special teams (ST): 1 Gary Anderson K; 4 Dan Stryzinski P	Practice squad: 72 Bob Dahl G; 78 Garry Howe NT; 79 Jarrod Johnson C; Reserve: 60 Brian Blankenship G (IR); 88 Chris Calloway WR (IR); 67 Dean Dingman G (IR); 29 Barry Foster RB (IR); 86 Eric Green TE (IR); 22 Larry Griffin CB (IR); 35 Delton Hall CB (IR); 84 Mike Mularkey TE (IR); 71 Tom Ricketts G (IR); Rookies in italics 47 active, 9 reserve, 3 practice squad

== Preseason ==
=== Schedule ===
Week	Date	Opponent	Result	Record	Venue
1	August 4	Washington Redskins	W 16–7	1–0	Three Rivers Stadium
2	August 10	at Minnesota Vikings	L 24–34	1–1	Hubert H. Humphrey Metrodome
3	August 17	at Philadelphia Eagles	L 20–21	1–2	Veterans Stadium
4	August 23	at Detroit Lions	W 16–3	2–2	Pontiac Silverdome

== Regular season ==
=== Schedule ===
Week	Date	Opponent	Result	Record	Venue
1	September 1	San Diego Chargers	**W** 26–20	1–0	Three Rivers Stadium
2	September 8	at Buffalo Bills	**L** 34–52	1–1	Rich Stadium
3	September 15	New England Patriots	**W** 20–6	2–1	Three Rivers Stadium
4	September 22	at Philadelphia Eagles	**L** 14–23	2–2	Veterans Stadium
5	Bye				
6	October 6	at Indianapolis Colts	**W** 21–3	3–2	Hoosier Dome
7	October 14	New York Giants	**L** 20–23	3–3	Three Rivers Stadium
8	October 20	Seattle Seahawks	**L** 7–27	3–4	Three Rivers Stadium
9	October 27	at **Cleveland Browns**	**L** 14–17	3–5	Cleveland Municipal Stadium
10	November 3	at Denver Broncos	**L** 13–20	3–6	Mile High Stadium
11	November 10	at **Cincinnati Bengals**	**W** 33–27	4–6	Riverfront Stadium
12	November 17	Washington Redskins	**L** 14–41	4–7	Three Rivers Stadium
13	November 24	**Houston Oilers**	**W** 26–14	5–7	Three Rivers Stadium
14	November 28	at Dallas Cowboys	**L** 10–20	5–8	Texas Stadium
15	December 8	at **Houston Oilers**	**L** 6–31	5–9	Astrodome
16	December 15	**Cincinnati Bengals**	**W** 17–10	6–9	Three Rivers Stadium
17	December 22	**Cleveland Browns**	**W** 17–10	7–9	Three Rivers Stadium
Note: Intra-division opponents are in **bold** text.

=== Game summaries ===
==== Week 1 (Sunday September 1, 1991): vs. San Diego Chargers ====
	1	2	3	4	Total
Chargers	0	3	0	17	**20**
**Steelers**	3	7	6	10	**26**

at Three Rivers Stadium, Pittsburgh, Pennsylvania

- Game time: 4:00 PM EDT
- Game weather: 80 °F (27 °C) (Sunny)
- Game attendance: 55,848
- Referee: Gerald Austin
- TV announcers: (NBC) Joel Meyers (play by play), Dan Hampton (color commentator)

Scoring drives:

- Pittsburgh – FG Anderson 38
- San Diego – FG Carney 48
- Pittsburgh – Calloway 33 pass from Brister (Anderson kick)
- Pittsburgh – FG Anderson 29
- Pittsburgh – FG Anderson 31
- Pittsburgh – FG Anderson 39
- San Diego – Lewis 11 pass from Bernstine (Carney kick)
- San Diego – FG Carney 35
- Pittsburgh – Stone 89 pass from O'Donnell (Anderson kick)
- San Diego – Jefferson 5 pass from Friesz (Carney kick)

==== Week 2 (Sunday September 8, 1991): at Buffalo Bills ====
	1	2	3	4	Total
Steelers	0	10	17	7	**34**
**Bills**	10	14	7	21	**52**

at Rich Stadium, Orchard Park, New York

- Game time: 1:00 PM EDT
- Game weather: 84 °F (29 °C) (Sunny)
- Game attendance: 79,545
- Referee: Tom Dooley
- TV announcers: (NBC) Tom Hammond (play by play), Joe Namath (color commentator)

Scoring drives:

- Buffalo – Lofton 53 pass from Kelly (Norwood kick)
- Buffalo – FG Norwood 50
- Pittsburgh – FG Anderson 25
- Buffalo – Beebe 34 pass from Kelly (Norwood kick)
- Buffalo – Beebe 14 pass from Kelly (Norwood kick)
- Pittsburgh – Foster 56 run (Anderson kick)
- Buffalo – Reed 14 pass from Kelly (Norwood kick)
- PIttsburgh – W. Williams 1 run (Anderson kick)
- Pittsburgh – Hinkle 57 interception return (Anderson kick)
- Pittsburgh – FG Anderson 27
- Buffalo – Beebe 11 pass from Kelly (Norwood kick)
- Buffalo – Beebe 4 pass from Kelly (Norwood kick)
- Buffalo – Odomes 32 interception return (Norwood kick)
- Pittsburgh – Hoge 1 run (Anderson kick)

==== Week 3 (Sunday September 15, 1991): vs. New England Patriots ====
	1	2	3	4	Total
Patriots	0	6	0	0	**6**
**Steelers**	3	3	0	14	**20**

at Three Rivers Stadium, Pittsburgh, Pennsylvania

- Game time: 1:00 PM EDT
- Game weather: 86 °F (30 °C) (Sunny)
- Game attendance: 53,703
- Referee: Johnny Grier
- TV announcers: (NBC) Joel Meyers (play by play), Dan Hampton (color commentator)

Scoring drives:

- Pittsburgh – FG Anderson 49
- New England – FG Staurovsky 33
- New England – FG Staurovsky 28
- Pittsburgh – FG Anderson 32
- Pittsburgh – Green 32 pass from Brister (Anderson kick)
- Pittsburgh – Mills recovered blocked punt in end zone (Anderson kick)

==== Week 4 (Sunday September 22, 1991): at Philadelphia Eagles ====
	1	2	3	4	Total
Steelers	14	0	0	0	**14**
**Eagles**	7	6	7	3	**23**

at Veterans Stadium, Philadelphia, Pennsylvania

- Game time: 1:00 PM EDT
- Game weather: 66 °F (19 °C) (Mostly Sunny)
- Game attendance: 65,511
- Referee: Bernie Kukar
- TV announcers: (NBC) Marv Albert (play by play), Bill Parcells (color commentator)

Scoring drives:

- Pittsburgh – Hoge 12 pass from Brister (Anderson kick)
- Philadelphia – McMahon 1 run (Ruzek kick)
- Pittsburgh – Green 8 pass from Brister (Anderson kick)
- Philadelphia – FG Ruzek 27
- Philadelphia – FG Ruzek 34
- Philadelphia – Drummond 2 run (Ruzek kick)
- Philadelphia – FG Ruzek 20

With their 5th loss to the Eagles on the road since 1965, the Steelers entered their bye week at 2-2.

==== Week 6 (Sunday October 6, 1991): at Indianapolis Colts ====
	1	2	3	4	Total
**Steelers**	0	0	7	14	**21**
Colts	0	3	0	0	**3**

at Hoosier Dome, Indianapolis, Indiana

- Game time: 8:00 PM EDT
- Game weather: Dome
- Game attendance: 55,383
- Referee: Larry Nemmers
- TV announcers: (TNT) Skip Caray (play by play), Pat Haden (color commentator)

Scoring drives:

- Indianapolis – FG Biasucci 19
- Pittsburgh – Green 21 pass from Brister (Anderson kick)
- Pittsburgh – Foster 24 pass from Brister (Anderson kick)
- Pittsburgh – Hoge 1 run (Anderson kick)

==== Week 7 (Monday October 14, 1991): vs. New York Giants ====
	1	2	3	4	Total
**Giants**	7	6	7	3	**23**
Steelers	0	0	3	17	**20**

at Three Rivers Stadium, Pittsburgh, Pennsylvania

- Game time: 9:00 PM EDT
- Game weather: 59 °F (15 °C) (Cloudy)
- Game attendance: 57,608
- Referee: Red Cashion
- TV announcers: (ABC) Al Michaels (play by play), Frank Gifford & Dan Dierdorf (color commentators)

Scoring drives:

- New York Giants – Cross 12 pass from Hostetler (Bahr kick)
- New York Giants – FG Bahr 45
- New York Giants – FG Bahr 40
- New York Giants – Meggett 30 run (Bahr kick)
- Pittsburgh – FG Anderson 26
- Pittsburgh – FG Anderson 39
- Pittsburgh – Lipps 16 pass from O'Donnell (Anderson kick)
- Pittsburgh – Green 5 pass from O'Donnell (Anderson kick)
- New York Giants – FG Bahr 44

Despite a second half rally, the Steelers were defeated 23-20 and they fell to 3-3. This would be their last home loss on a Monday night until the 2025 AFC Wild Card vs the Houston Texans, as the Steelers would have a 23 game win streak at home on Monday Night Football from 1992-2025.

==== Week 8 (Sunday October 20, 1991): vs. Seattle Seahawks ====
	1	2	3	4	Total
**Seahawks**	3	14	3	7	**27**
Steelers	0	0	7	0	**7**

at Three Rivers Stadium, Pittsburgh, Pennsylvania

- Game time: 1:00 PM EDT
- Game weather: 47 °F (8 °C) (Partly Sunny)
- Game attendance: 54,678
- Referee: Gordon McCarter
- TV announcers: (NBC) Mel Proctor (play by play), Joe Namath (color commentator)

Scoring drives:

- Seattle – FG Kasay 36
- Seattle – Williams 1 run (Kasay kick)
- Seattle – Chadwick 14 pass from Krieg (Kasay kick)
- Pittsburgh – Stone 57 pass from O'Donnell (Anderson kick)
- Seattle – FG Kasay 21
- Seattle – Tice 1 pass from Krieg (Kasay kick)

==== Week 9 (Sunday October 27, 1991): at Cleveland Browns ====
	1	2	3	4	Total
Steelers	0	7	0	7	**14**
**Browns**	3	7	7	0	**17**

at Cleveland Municipal Stadium, Cleveland, Ohio

- Game time: 4:00 PM EST
- Game weather:
- Game attendance: 78,285
- Referee: Bob McElwee
- TV announcers: (NBC) Don Criqui (play by play), Bob Trumpy (color commentator)

Scoring drives:

- Cleveland – FG Stover 34
- Cleveland – Hoard 2 pass from Kosar (Stover kick)
- Pittsburgh – O'Donnell 1 run (Anderson kick)
- Cleveland – Mack 1 run (Stover kick)
- Pittsburgh – W. Williams 1 run (Anderson kick)

==== Week 10 (Sunday November 3, 1991): at Denver Broncos ====
	1	2	3	4	Total
Steelers	3	7	0	3	**13**
**Broncos**	0	17	3	0	**20**

at Mile High Stadium, Denver, Colorado

- Game time: 8:00 PM EST
- Game weather: 16 °F (−9 °C), wind 8 mph (13 km/h) mph
- Game attendance: 70,973
- Referee: Dale Hamer
- TV announcers: (ESPN) Mike Patrick (play by play), Joe Theismann (color commentator)

Scoring drives:

- Pittsburgh – FG Anderson 26
- Pittsburgh – Green 23 pass from O'Donnell (Anderson kick)
- Denver – Lewis 1 run (Treadwell kick)
- Denver – Elway 4 run (Treadwell kick)
- Denver – FG Treadwell 28
- Denver – FG Treadwell 21
- Pittsburgh – FG Anderson 39

==== Week 11 (Sunday November 10, 1991): at Cincinnati Bengals ====
	1	2	3	4	OT	Total
**Steelers**	0	6	7	14	6	**33**
Bengals	10	7	0	10	0	**27**

at Riverfront Stadium, Cincinnati, Ohio

- Game time: 1:00 PM EST
- Game weather:
- Game attendance: 55,503
- Referee: Jerry Markbreit
- TV announcers: (NBC) Joel Meyers (play by play), Dan Hampton (color commentator)

Scoring drives:

- Cincinnati – FG Breech 29
- Cincinnati – Woods 4 run (Breech kick)
- Pittsburgh – FG Anderson 44
- Cincinnati – Holman 18 pass from Esiason (Breech kick)
- Pittsburgh – FG Anderson 46
- Pittsburgh – J. Williams 38 fumble return (Anderson kick)
- Cincinnati – Woods 1 run (Breech kick)
- Pittsburgh – Mills 35 pass from O'Donnell (Anderson kick)
- Pittsburgh – Lipps 12 pass from O'Donnell (Anderson kick)
- Cincinnati – FG Breech 47
- Pittsburgh – Green 26 pass from O'Donnell

==== Week 12 (Sunday November 17, 1991): vs. Washington Redskins ====
	1	2	3	4	Total
**Redskins**	7	10	10	14	**41**
Steelers	0	0	0	14	**14**

at Three Rivers Stadium, Pittsburgh, Pennsylvania

- Game time: 1:00 PM EST
- Game weather: 47 °F (8 °C) (Sunny)
- Game attendance: 56,813
- Referee: Tom White
- TV announcers: (CBS) Dick Stockton (play by play), Merlin Olsen (color commentator)

Scoring drives:

- Washington – Riggs 1 run (Lohmiller kick)
- Washington – FG Lohmiller 36
- Washington – Monk 11 pass from Rypien (Lohmiller kick)
- Washington – FG Lohmiller 41
- Washington – Riggs 1 run (Lohmiller kick)
- Pittsburgh – Cooper 5 pass from O'Donnell (Anderson kick)
- Pittsburgh – Stone 40 pass from O'Donnell (Anderson kick)
- Washington – Clark 49 pass from Rypien (Lohmiller kick)
- Washington – Sanders 40 pass from Rutledge (Lohmiller kick)

==== Week 13 (Sunday November 24, 1991): vs. Houston Oilers ====
	1	2	3	4	Total
Oilers	0	7	0	7	**14**
**Steelers**	6	10	7	3	**26**

at Three Rivers Stadium, Pittsburgh, Pennsylvania

- Game time: 1:00 PM EST
- Game weather: 34 °F (1 °C) (Cloudy)
- Game attendance: 45,795
- Referee: Howard Roe
- TV announcers: (NBC) Don Criqui (play by play), Bob Trumpy (color commentator)

Scoring drives:

- Pittsburgh – FG Anderson 20
- Pittsburgh – FG Anderson 28
- Houston – Givins 10 pass from Moon (Del Greco kick)
- Pittsburgh – FG Anderson 33
- Pittsburgh – Stone 43 pass from O'Donnell (Anderson kick)
- Pittsburgh – W. Williams 1 run (Anderson kick)
- Houston – Jeffries 15 pass from Moon (Del Greco kick)
- Pittsburgh – FG Anderson 24

==== Week 14 (Thursday November 28, 1991): at Dallas Cowboys ====
	1	2	3	4	Total
Steelers	0	0	3	7	**10**
**Cowboys**	7	3	0	10	**20**

at Texas Stadium, Irving, Texas

- Game time: 4:00 PM EST
- Game weather:
- Game attendance: 62,253
- Referee: Red Cashion
- TV announcers: (NBC) Dick Enberg (play by play), Bill Walsh (color commentator)

Scoring drives:

- Dallas – E. Smith 6 run (Willis kick)
- Dallas – FG Willis 19
- Pittsburgh – FG Anderson 42
- Dallas – FG Willis 43
- Pittsburgh – W. Williams 3 run (Anderson kick)
- Dallas – Irvin 66 pass from Beuerlein (Willis kick)

==== Week 15 (Sunday December 8, 1991): at Houston Oilers ====
	1	2	3	4	Total
Steelers	0	3	3	0	**6**
**Oilers**	7	3	7	14	**31**

at Astrodome, Houston, Texas

- Game time: 1:00 PM EST
- Game weather: Dome
- Game attendance: 59,225
- Referee: Bob McElwee
- TV announcers: (NBC) Charlie Jones (play by play), Todd Christensen (color commentator)

Scoring drives:

- Houston – Pinkett 7 run (Del Greco kick)
- Houston – FG Del Greco 24
- Pittsburgh – FG Anderson 54
- Houston – Jeffires 16 pass from Moon (Del Greco kick)
- Pittsburgh – FG Anderson 36
- Houston – Pinkett 11 run (Del Greco kick)
- Houston – A. Smith 70 fumble return (Del Greco kick)

==== Week 16 vs Bengals ====
Week Sixteen: Cincinnati Bengals (2–12) at Pittsburgh Steelers (5–9)

Quarter	1	2	3	4	Total
Bengals	0	7	3	0	**10**
**Steelers**	10	0	0	7	**17**

at Three Rivers Stadium, Pittsburgh, Pennsylvania

- Date: December 15
- Game time: 1:00 p.m. EDT
- Game weather: Mostly sunny, 31 °F (−1 °C)
- Game attendance: 35,420
- Referee: Gordon McCarter
- TV announcers (NBC): Don Criqui and Bob Trumpy
- Box Score

Game information

First quarter

- PIT – Adrian Cooper 47-yard pass from Bubby Brister (Gary Anderson kick), 12:59. Steelers 7–0.
- PIT – Gary Anderson 47-yard field goal, 3:48. Steelers 10–0.

Second quarter

- CIN – David Fulcher 27-yard interception return (Jim Breech kick), 14:00. Steelers 10–7.

Third quarter

- CIN – Jim Breech 39-yard field goal, 5:10. Tie 10–10.

Fourth quarter

- PIT – Keith Cash 19-yard pass from Bubby Brister (Gary Anderson kick), 14:55. Steelers 17–10.

Top passers

- CIN – Boomer Esiason – 14/26, 125 yards, 2 INT
- PIT – Bubby Brister – 15/28, 184 yards, 2 TD, 2 INT

Top rushers

- CIN – Harold Green – 18 rushes, 62 yards
- PIT – Merril Hoge – 16 rushes, 79 yards

Top receivers

- CIN – Eddie Brown – 5 receptions, 50 yards
- PIT – Keith Cash – 4 receptions, 55 yards, TD

==== Week 17 vs Browns ====
Week Seventeen: Cleveland Browns (6–9) at Pittsburgh Steelers (6–9)

Quarter	1	2	3	4	Total
Browns	0	3	0	7	**10**
**Steelers**	3	0	7	7	**17**

at Three Rivers Stadium, Pittsburgh, Pennsylvania

- Date: December 22
- Game time: 1:00 p.m. EDT
- Game weather: Sunny, 39 °F (4 °C)
- Game attendance: 47,070
- Referee: Pat Haggerty
- TV announcers (NBC): Don Criqui and Bob Trumpy
- Box Score, Box Score

Game information

First quarter

- PIT – Gary Anderson 34-yard field goal, 0:59. Steelers 3–0.

Second quarter

- CLE – Matt Stover 19-yard field goal, 6:18. Tie 3–3.

Third quarter

- PIT – Dwight Stone 65-yard pass from Bubby Brister (Gary Anderson kick), 0:16. Steelers 10–3.

Fourth quarter

- PIT – Richard Shelton 57-yard interception return (Gary Anderson kick), 9:28. Steelers 17–3.
- CLE – Michael Jackson 27-yard pass from Bernie Kosar (Matt Stover kick), 6:56. Steelers 17–10.

Top passers

- CLE – Bernie Kosar – 28/49, 335 yards, TD, 3 INT
- PIT – Bubby Brister – 7/26, 113 yards, TD

Top rushers

- CLE – Joe Morris – 12 rushes, 26 yards
- PIT – Tim Worley – 16 rushes, 84 yards

Top receivers

- CLE – Webster Slaughter – 11 receptions, 138 yards
- PIT – Dwight Stone – 3 receptions, 76 yards, TD

Chuck Noll's final game as head coach

=== Standings ===
AFC Central
	W	L	T	PCT	DIV	CONF	PF	PA	STK
^{(3)} Houston Oilers	11	5	0	.688	5–1	10–2	386	251	L1
Pittsburgh Steelers	7	9	0	.438	4–2	7–5	292	344	W2
Cleveland Browns	6	10	0	.375	2–4	6–6	293	298	L3
Cincinnati Bengals	3	13	0	.188	1–5	2–10	263	435	W1
