= 1992 Pittsburgh Steelers season =

Pittsburgh Steelers 60th US football season

- Steelers Diamond Jubilee Logo
- Owner: The Rooney Family
- General manager: Tom Donahoe
- Head coach: Bill Cowher
- Offensive coordinator: Ron Erhardt
- Defensive coordinator: Dom Capers
- Home stadium: Three Rivers Stadium

Results
- Record: 11–5
- Division place: 1st AFC Central
- Playoffs: Lost Divisional Playoffs (vs. Bills) 3–24
- All-Pros: 2: Barry Foster (1st team); Rod Woodson (1st team)
- Pro Bowlers: 6: C Dermontti Dawson; RB Barry Foster; OG Carlton Haselrig; OLB Greg Lloyd; QB Neil O'Donnell; CB Rod Woodson
- Team MVP: Barry Foster
- Team ROY: Darren Perry

The 1992 Pittsburgh Steelers season was the franchise's 60th season as a professional sports franchise and as a member of the National Football League.

The Pittsburgh Steelers celebrated their 60th Anniversary season in 1992. This was also Bill Cowher's first season as head coach following the retirement of Chuck Noll after 23 seasons. The team was coming off a 7–9 season in 1991.

Cowher led the Steelers to an 11–5 record in his first season and the top seed in the AFC playoffs. However, in what later became commonplace in Cowher's reign as coach of the Steelers, the team failed to capitalize on the seeding and lost at home to the eventual AFC champion Buffalo Bills in the divisional playoffs.

== Offseason ==
Additions	Subtractions
TE Tim Jorden (Cardinals)	DE Keith Willis (Bills)
P Mark Royals (Buccaneers)	WR Louis Lipps (Saints)
G Duval Love (Rams)	CB Delton Hall (Chargers)
S Solomon Wilcots (Vikings)	WR Chris Calloway (Giants)
T Stan Clayton (Patriots)	

=== NFL draft ===
1992 Pittsburgh Steelers draft
Round	Pick	Player	Position	College	Notes
1	11	Leon Searcy *	Tackle	Miami (FL)	
2	38	Levon Kirkland *	Linebacker	Clemson	
3	67	Joel Steed *	Nose tackle	Colorado	
4	94	Charles Davenport	Wide receiver	North Carolina State	
5	123	Alan Haller	Cornerback	Michigan State	
7	179	Russ Campbell	Tight end	Kansas State	
7	188	Scottie Graham	Running back	Ohio State	
8	203	Darren Perry	Free safety	Penn State	
8	206	Hesham Ismail	Guard	Florida	
8	215	Nate Williams	Defensive tackle	Mississippi State	
9	235	Elnardo Webster	Linebacker	Rutgers	
10	262	Mike Saunders	Running back	Iowa	
11	262	Kendall Gammon *	Long snapper	Pittsburg State	
12	318	Cornelius Benton	Quarterback	Connecticut	
Made roster

=== Undrafted free agents ===
1992 undrafted free agents of note
Player	Position	College
Johnnie Black	Defensive Lineman	Sam Houston State
Gerry Collins	Running back	Penn State
David Daniels	Running back	East Carolina
Mark Didio	Wide receiver	UConn
David Hargett	Defensive back	Georgia
Andrew Hill	Wide receiver	IUP
Henry Ostaszewski	Defensive Lineman	Florida State
Darrick Owens	Wide receiver	Ole Miss
Kacy Rodgers	Linebacker	Tennessee
Paul Siffri	Tight end	Furman
Derrick Thomas	Linebacker	Kentucky

== Staff ==
1992 Pittsburgh Steelers staff
Front office: President – Daniel M. Rooney; Vice president – John R. McGinley; Vice president – Arthur J. Rooney, Jr.; Secretary & counsel – Arthur J. Rooney II; Administration advisor – Chuck Noll; Director of communications – Joe Gordon; Public relations coordinator – Dan Edwards; PR Assistant/Community Relations – Ron Miller; Controller – Dan McGrogan; Assistant controller – Dan Ferens; Assistant controller – Jim Ellenberger; Ticket sales manager – Geraldine Glenn; Football operations; Director of football operations – Tom Donahoe; Football business manager – James A. Boston; Player development coordinator – Anthony Griggs; Scouting staff; Director of scouting – Tom Modrak; Pro personnel coordinator – Charles Bailey; College scout – Bob Schmitz; College scout – Max McCartney; College scout – Phil Kreidler; BLESTO College Scout – Bob Lane; Head coaches: Head coach – Bill Cowher; Offensive coaches: Offensive coordinator – Ron Erhardt; Offensive backfield – Dick Hoak; Wide receivers – Bob Harrison; Tight ends – Pat Hodgson; Offensive line – Kent Stephenson	Defensive coaches: Defensive coordinator – Dom Capers; Defensive line – Steve Furness; Linebackers – Marvin Lewis; Defensive backs – Dick LeBeau; Special teams coaches: Special teams – John Guy; Strength and conditioning: Conditioning coordinator – Chet Fuhrman; Medical staff; Physician, orthopedic – Dr. James P. Bradley; Ophthalmologist – Dr. Phillip Buzzelli; Neurological surgery consultant – Dr. Joseph Maroon; Physician, M.D. – Dr. Richard Rydze; Physician, consultant – Dr. Abraham J. Twerski; Physician, M.D. – Dr. Anthony P. Yates; Training staff; Head trainer – John Norwig; Administrative trainer - Ralph Berlin; Equipment manager – Anthony Parisi; Field manager – Rodgers Freyvogel; Video coordinator – Bob McCartney; Video assistant – Pat Dolan; Photographers – Mike Fabus, Bill Amatucci

Notable additions include Levon Kirkland, Joel Steed, Darren Perry and Yancey Thigpen

== Roster ==
1992 Pittsburgh Steelers roster
Quarterbacks (QB): 6 Bubby Brister; 14 Neil O'Donnell; 11 Rick Strom; Running backs (RB): 29 Barry Foster; 33 Merril Hoge FB; 34 Leroy Thompson; 42 Warren Williams; Wide receivers (WR): 80 Charles Davenport; 81 Jeff Graham; 89 Ernie Mills; 20 Dwight Stone KR; 82 Yancey Thigpen; Tight ends (TE): 87 Adrian Cooper; 86 Eric Green; 84 Tim Jorden	Offensive linemen (OL): 63 Dermontti Dawson C; 77 Carlton Haselrig G; 62 Tunch Ilkin T; 65 John Jackson T; 67 Duval Love G; 72 Leon Searcy T; 69 Ariel Solomon G; 73 Justin Strzelczyk T; Defensive linemen (DL): 64 Kenny Davidson DE; 66 Donald Evans DE; 78 Garry Howe NT; 97 Aaron Jones DE; 98 Gerald Williams NT; 93 Joel Steed NT	Linebackers (LB): 53 Bryan Hinkle OLB; 99 Levon Kirkland ILB; 50 David Little ILB; 95 Greg Lloyd OLB; 54 Hardy Nickerson ILB; 55 Jerry Olsavsky ILB; 57 Jerrol Williams OLB; Defensive backs (DB): 22 Larry Griffin SS; 44 D. J. Johnson CB; 37 Carnell Lake SS; 39 Darren Perry FS; 24 Richard Shelton CB; 23 Sammy Walker CB; 41 Solomon Wilcots FS; 26 Rod Woodson CB; Special teams (ST): 1 Gary Anderson K; 60 Kendall Gammon LS; 3 Mark Royals P	Practice squad: 88 Mark Didio WR; 79 Mike Finn DE; 40 Stan Smagala S; 43 Maury Toy RB; Reserve: 25 Gary Jones S (IR); 92 Elnardo Webster LB (IR); 38 Tim Worley RB (Susp.); Rookies in italics 47 active, 3 reserve, 4 practice squad

== Preseason ==
=== Schedule ===
Week	Date	Opponent	Result	Record	Venue
1	August 8	Philadelphia Eagles	L 33–35	0–1	Three Rivers Stadium
2	August 17	at New Orleans Saints	L 0–26	0–2	Louisiana Superdome
3	August 23	at Chicago Bears	W 28–17	1–2	Soldier Field
4	August 29	New York Giants	W 24–3	2–2	Three Rivers Stadium

== Regular season ==
=== Schedule ===
Week	Date	Opponent	Result	Record	Venue
1	September 6	at **Houston Oilers**	**W** 29–24	1–0	Astrodome
2	September 13	New York Jets	**W** 27–10	2–0	Three Rivers Stadium
3	September 20	at San Diego Chargers	**W** 23–6	3–0	Jack Murphy Stadium
4	September 27	at Green Bay Packers	**L** 3–17	3–1	Lambeau Field
5	Bye				
6	October 11	at **Cleveland Browns**	**L** 9–17	3–2	Cleveland Municipal Stadium
7	October 19	**Cincinnati Bengals**	**W** 20–0	4–2	Three Rivers Stadium
8	October 25	at Kansas City Chiefs	**W** 27–3	5–2	Arrowhead Stadium
9	November 1	**Houston Oilers**	**W** 21–20	6–2	Three Rivers Stadium
10	November 8	at Buffalo Bills	**L** 20–28	6–3	Rich Stadium
11	November 15	Detroit Lions	**W** 17–14	7–3	Three Rivers Stadium
12	November 22	Indianapolis Colts	**W** 30–14	8–3	Three Rivers Stadium
13	November 29	at **Cincinnati Bengals**	**W** 21–9	9–3	Riverfront Stadium
14	December 6	Seattle Seahawks	**W** 20–14	10–3	Three Rivers Stadium
15	December 13	at Chicago Bears	**L** 6–30	10–4	Soldier Field
16	December 20	Minnesota Vikings	**L** 6–3	10–5	Three Rivers Stadium
17	December 27	**Cleveland Browns**	**W** 23–13	11–5	Three Rivers Stadium
Note: Intra-division opponents are in **bold** text.

=== Game summaries ===
==== Week 1 (Sunday September 6, 1992): at Houston Oilers ====
	1	2	3	4	Total
**Steelers**	7	9	6	7	**29**
Oilers	14	10	0	0	**24**

at Astrodome, Houston, Texas

- Game time: 1:00 pm EDT
- Game weather: Dome
- Game attendance: 63,713
- Referee: Gary Lane
- TV announcers: (NBC) Charlie Jones (play by play), Todd Christensen (color commentator)

Bill Cowher wins his first game as Steelers Head Coach.

Scoring drives:

- Houston – Meads 15 fumble return (Del Greco kick)
- Houston – Givins 11 pass from Moon (Del Greco kick)
- Pittsburgh – Foster 1 run (Anderson kick)
- Pittsburgh – FG Anderson 30
- Houston – FG Del Greco 36
- Pittsburgh – Graham 26 pass from O'Donnell (Anderson kick)
- Houston – Givins 8 pass from Moon (Del Greco kick)
- Pittsburgh – FG Anderson 25
- Pittsburgh – FG Anderson 37
- Pittsburgh – Cooper 9 pass from O'Donnell (Anderson kick)

==== Week 2 (Sunday September 13, 1992): vs. New York Jets ====
	1	2	3	4	Total
Jets	3	7	0	0	**10**
**Steelers**	0	10	0	17	**27**

at Three Rivers Stadium, Pittsburgh, Pennsylvania

- Game time: 4:00 pm EDT
- Game weather: 75 °F (24 °C) (Sunny)
- Game attendance: 56,050
- Referee: Gordon McCarter
- TV announcers: (NBC) Charlie Jones (play by play), Todd Christensen (color commentator)

Scoring drives:

- New York Jets – FG Staurovsky 32
- Pittsburgh – Foster 23 run (Anderson kick)
- New York Jets – Brim 77 interception return (Staurovsky kick)
- Pittsburgh – FG Anderson 28
- Pittsburgh – Foster 54 run (Anderson kick)
- Pittsburgh – FG Anderson 35
- Pittsburgh – Griffin 65 interception return (Anderson kick)

==== Week 3 (Sunday September 20, 1992): at San Diego Chargers ====
	1	2	3	4	Total
**Steelers**	0	7	0	16	**23**
Chargers	3	3	0	0	**6**

at Jack Murphy Stadium, San Diego, California

- Game time: 4:00 pm EDT
- Game weather:
- Game attendance: 46,127
- Referee: Pat Haggerty
- TV announcers: (NBC) Charlie Jones (play by play), Todd Christensen (color commentator)

Scoring drives:

- San Diego – FG Carney 24
- Pittsburgh – Cooper 24 pass from O'Donnell (Anderson kick)
- San Diego – FG Carney 43
- Pittsburgh – Stone 6 pass from O'Donnell (kick failed)
- Pittsburgh – O'Donnell 1 run (Anderson kick)
- Pittsburgh – FG Anderson 42

==== Week 4 (Sunday September 27, 1992): at Green Bay Packers ====
	1	2	3	4	Total
Steelers	3	0	0	0	**3**
**Packers**	0	10	0	7	**17**

at Lambeau Field, Green Bay, Wisconsin

- Game time: 4:00 pm EDT
- Game weather:
- Game attendance: 58,724
- Referee: Howard Roe
- TV announcers: (NBC) Charlie Jones (play by play), Todd Christensen (color commentator)

Scoring drives:

- Pittsburgh – FG Anderson 35
- Green Bay – FG Jacke 47
- Green Bay – Sharpe 76 pass from Favre (Jacke kick)
- Green Bay – Brooks 8 pass from Favre (Jacke kick)

==== Week 6 (Sunday October 11, 1992): at Cleveland Browns ====
	1	2	3	4	Total
Steelers	3	3	0	3	**9**
**Browns**	0	3	7	7	**17**

at Cleveland Municipal Stadium, Cleveland, Ohio

- Game time: 1:00 pm EDT
- Game weather:
- Game attendance: 78,080
- Referee: Larry Nemmers
- TV announcers: (NBC) Joel Meyers (play by play), Ahmad Rashad (color commentator)

Scoring drives:

- Pittsburgh – FG Anderson 25
- Pittsburgh – FG Anderson 36
- Cleveland – FG Stover 51
- Cleveland – Mack 1 run (Stover kick)
- Pittsburgh – FG Anderson 40
- Cleveland – Jackson 47 pass from Tomczak (Stover kick)

==== Week 7 (Monday October 19, 1992): vs. Cincinnati Bengals ====
	1	2	3	4	Total
Bengals	0	0	0	0	**0**
**Steelers**	3	7	0	10	**20**

at Three Rivers Stadium, Pittsburgh, Pennsylvania

- Game time: 9:00 pm EDT
- Game weather: 32 °F (0 °C) (Clear)
- Game attendance: 55,411
- Referee: Gerald Austin
- TV announcers: (ABC) Al Michaels (play by play), Frank Gifford & Dan Dierdorf (color commentators)

Scoring drives:

- Pittsburgh – FG Anderson 21
- Pittsburgh – Stone 24 pass from O'Donnell (Anderson kick)
- Pittsburgh – Stone 5 pass from O'Donnell (Anderson kick)
- Pittsburgh – FG Anderson 27

==== Week 8 (Sunday October 25, 1992): at Kansas City Chiefs ====
	1	2	3	4	Total
**Steelers**	7	6	7	7	**27**
Chiefs	0	3	0	0	**3**

at Arrowhead Stadium, Kansas City, Missouri

- On October 24, 1992, Eddie Murray (American football) signed with the Kansas City Chiefs to play this game in place of an injured Nick Lowery. He was released on October 28.

- Game time: 7:30 pm EST
- Game weather: 61 °F (16 °C) • 9 miles per hour (14 km/h; 7.8 kn)
- Game attendance: 76,175
- Referee: Tom White
- TV announcers: NFL on TNT (TNT) Gary Bender (play by play), Pat Haden (color commentator)

Scoring drives:

- Pittsburgh – Woodson 80 punt return (Anderson kick)
- Pittsburgh – FG Anderson 49
- Pittsburgh – FG Anderson 30
- Kansas City – FG Murray 52
- Pittsburgh – Foster 4 run (Anderson kick)
- Pittsburgh – Green 4 pass from O'Donnell (Anderson kick)

==== Week 9 (Sunday November 1, 1992): vs. Houston Oilers ====
	1	2	3	4	Total
Oilers	3	3	14	0	**20**
**Steelers**	0	7	0	14	**21**

at Three Rivers Stadium, Pittsburgh, Pennsylvania

- Game time: 1:00 pm EST
- Game weather: 47 °F (8 °C) (Light Rain)
- Game attendance: 58,074
- Referee: Ed Hochuli
- TV announcers: (NBC) Marv Albert (play by play), Bill Parcells (color commentator)

Scoring drives:

- Houston – FG Del Greco 29
- Houston – FG Del Greco 19
- Pittsburgh – Foster 1 run (Anderson kick)
- Houston – Slaughter 11 pass from Carlson (Del Greco kick)
- Houston – Childress 8 fumble return (Del Greco kick)
- Pittsburgh – Cooper 2 pass from O'Donnell (Anderson kick)
- Pittsburgh – Green 5 pass from O'Donnell (Anderson kick)

==== Week 10 (Sunday November 8, 1992): at Buffalo Bills ====
	1	2	3	4	Total
Steelers	0	6	14	0	**20**
**Bills**	7	14	7	0	**28**

at Rich Stadium, Orchard Park, New York

- Game time: 4:00 pm EST
- Game weather:
- Game attendance: 80,294
- Referee: Bob McElwee
- TV announcers: (NBC) Marv Albert (play by play), Bill Parcells (color commentator)

Scoring drives:

- Buffalo – Lofton 22 pass from Kelly (Christie kick)
- Pittsburgh – FG Anderson 28
- Buffalo – Frerotte 2 pass from Kelly (Christie kick)
- Buffalo – Thomas 1 run (Christie kick)
- Pittsburgh – FG Anderson 49
- Pittsburgh – Mills 12 pass from O'Donnell (Anderson kick)
- Buffalo – Lofton 45 pass from Kelly (Christie kick)
- Pittsburgh – Hoge 11 pass from O'Donnell (Anderson kick)

==== Week 11 (Sunday November 15, 1992): vs. Detroit Lions ====
	1	2	3	4	Total
Lions	0	7	0	7	**14**
**Steelers**	7	3	0	7	**17**

at Three Rivers Stadium, Pittsburgh, Pennsylvania

- Game time: 1:00 pm EST
- Game weather: 29 °F (−2 °C) (Snow Showers)
- Game attendance: 52,242
- Referee: Johnny Grier
- TV announcers: (CBS) Sean McDonough (play by play), John Robinson (color commentator)

Scoring drives:

- Pittsburgh – Mills 11 pass from O'Donnell (Anderson kick)
- Pittsburgh – FG Anderson 20
- Detroit – Green 73 pass from Kramer (Hanson kick)
- Detroit – Sanders 1 run (Hanson kick)
- Pittsburgh – Jorden 1 pass from Brister (Anderson kick)

==== Week 12 (Sunday November 22, 1992): vs. Indianapolis Colts ====
	1	2	3	4	Total
Colts	0	0	7	7	**14**
**Steelers**	7	6	14	3	**30**

at Three Rivers Stadium, Pittsburgh, Pennsylvania

- Game time: 1:00 pm EST
- Game weather: 64 °F (18 °C) (Light Rain)
- Game attendance: 51,101
- Referee: Gary Lane
- TV announcers: (NBC) Tom Hammond (play by play), Cris Collinsworth (color commentator)

Scoring drives:

- Pittsburgh – Foster 20 run (Anderson kick)
- Pittsburgh – FG Anderson 31
- Pittsburgh – FG Anderson 22
- Indianapolis – Culver 1 run (Biasucci kick)
- Pittsburgh – Foster 13 run (Anderson kick)
- Pittsburgh – Thompson 2 run (Anderson kick)
- Indianapolis – Culver 4 pass from Trudeau (Biasucci kick)
- Pittsburgh – FG Anderson 36

==== Week 13 (Sunday November 29, 1992): at Cincinnati Bengals ====
	1	2	3	4	Total
**Steelers**	7	7	7	0	**21**
Bengals	0	6	0	3	**9**

at Riverfront Stadium, Cincinnati, Ohio

- Game time: 1:00 pm EST
- Game weather:
- Game attendance: 54,253
- Referee: Jerry Markbreit
- TV announcers: (NBC) Dan Hicks (play by play), John Dockery (color commentator)

Scoring drives:

- Pittsburgh – Davenport 34 fumble return (Anderson kick)
- Cincinnati – FG Breech 33
- Pittsburgh – Foster 2 run (Anderson kick)
- Cincinnati – FG Breech 42
- Pittsburgh – Foster 1 run (Anderson kick)
- Cincinnati – FG Breech 38

==== Week 14 (Sunday December 6, 1992): vs. Seattle Seahawks ====
	1	2	3	4	Total
Seahawks	0	7	7	0	**14**
**Steelers**	7	3	0	10	**20**

at Three Rivers Stadium, Pittsburgh, Pennsylvania

- Game time: 1:00 pm EST
- Game weather: 25 °F (−4 °C) (Cloudy)
- Game attendance: 47,015
- Referee: Larry Nemmers
- TV announcers: (NBC) Jim Lampley (play by play), Ahmad Rashad (color commentator)

Scoring drives:

- Pittsburgh – Mills 19 pass from O'Donnell (Anderson kick)
- Pittsburgh – FG Anderson 38
- Seattle – Kane 28 pass from Gelbaugh (Kasay kick)
- Seattle – Williams 3 pass from Gelbaugh (Kasay kick)
- Pittsburgh – Foster 4 run (Anderson kick)
- Pittsburgh – FG Anderson 39

==== Week 15 (Sunday December 13, 1992): at Chicago Bears ====
Week Fifteen: Pittsburgh Steelers (10–3) at Chicago Bears (4–9)

Quarter	1	2	3	4	Total
Steelers	0	3	0	3	**6**
**Bears**	3	10	7	10	**30**

at Soldier Field, Chicago, Illinois

- Date: December 13, 1992
- Game time: 1:00 p.m. EST
- Game weather: 34 °F (1 °C)
- Game attendance: 52, 904
- Referee: Gerald Austin
- TV announcers (NBC): Marv Albert and Bill Parcells
- Pro-Football-Reference, The Football Database

Game information

**First quarter**

- CHI – Kevin Butler 37-yard field goal, 3:40. Bears 3–0. Drive:

**Second quarter**

- CHI – Darren Lewis 3-yard run (Kevin Butler kick), 6:27. Bears 10–0. Drive:
- CHI – Kevin Butler 26-yard field goal, 0:50. Bears 13–0. Drive:
- PIT – Gary Anderson 38-yard field goal, 0:08. Bears 13–3. Drive:

**Third quarter**

- CHI – Neal Anderson 15-yard pass from Jim Harbaugh (Kevin Butler kick), 6:20. Bears 20–3. Drive:

**Fourth quarter**

- CHI – Kevin Butler 38-yard field goal, 13:35. Bears 23–3. Drive:
- PIT – Gary Anderson 38-yard field goal, 10:05. Bears 23–6. Drive:
- CHI – Neal Anderson 6-yard run (Kevin Butler kick), 3:02. Bears 30–6. Drive:

Top passers

- PIT – Bubby Brister – 14/31, 143 yards, 2 INT
- CHI – Jim Harbaugh – 11/21, 90 yards, TD

Top rushers

- PIT – Barry Foster – 12 rushes, 25 yards
- CHI – Neal Anderson – 11 rushes, 56 yards, TD

Top receivers

- PIT – Adrian Cooper – 3 receptions, 58 yards
- CHI – Wendell Davis – 3 receptions, 41 yards

==== Week 16 (Sunday December 20, 1992): vs. Minnesota Vikings ====
	1	2	3	4	Total
**Vikings**	0	0	0	6	**6**
Steelers	0	3	0	0	**3**

at Three Rivers Stadium, Pittsburgh, Pennsylvania

- Game time: 1:00 pm EST
- Game weather: 37 °F (3 °C) (Sunny)
- Game attendance: 53,613
- Referee: Dick Hantak
- TV announcers: (CBS) Verne Lundquist (play by play), Dan Fouts (color commentator)

Scoring drives:

- Pittsburgh – FG Anderson 23
- Minnesota – FG Reveiz 38
- Minnesota – FG Reveiz 36

==== Week 17 (Sunday December 27, 1992): vs. Cleveland Browns ====
	1	2	3	4	Total
Browns	0	3	7	3	**13**
**Steelers**	7	10	3	3	**23**

at Three Rivers Stadium, Pittsburgh, Pennsylvania

- Game time: 1:00 pm EST
- Game weather: 32 °F (0 °C) (Sunny)
- Game attendance: 53,776
- Referee: Bob McElwee
- TV announcers: (NBC) Joel Meyers (play by play), Paul Maguire (color commentator)

Scoring drives:

- Pittsburgh – Foster 7 run (Anderson kick)
- Cleveland – FG Stover 22
- Pittsburgh – Jorden 2 pass from Brister (Anderson kick)
- Pittsburgh – FG Anderson 26
- Cleveland – M. Jackson 38 pass from Tomczak (Stover kick)
- Pittsburgh – FG Anderson 29
- Cleveland – FG Stover 22
- Pittsburgh – FG Anderson 28

=== Standings ===
AFC Central
	W	L	T	PCT	DIV	CONF	PF	PA	STK
^{(1)} Pittsburgh Steelers	11	5	0	.688	5–1	10–2	299	225	W1
^{(5)} Houston Oilers	10	6	0	.625	3–3	7–5	352	258	W2
Cleveland Browns	7	9	0	.438	3–3	5–7	272	275	L3
Cincinnati Bengals	5	11	0	.313	1–5	4–8	274	364	L1

== Playoffs ==
=== Game summary ===
==== AFC Divisional Playoff (Saturday January 9, 1993): vs. Buffalo Bills ====
	1	2	3	4	Total
Bills	0	7	7	10	24
Steelers	3	0	0	0	3

at Three Rivers Stadium, Pittsburgh, Pennsylvania

- Game time: 12:30 pm EST
- Game weather: 37 °F (3 °C) (Light Rain)
- Game attendance: 60,407
- Referee: Bernie Kukar
- TV announcers: (NBC) Marv Albert (play by play), Bill Parcells (color commentator), John Dockery (Pittsburgh Sideline) and O. J. Simpson (Buffalo Sideline)

Scoring drives:

- Pittsburgh – FG Anderson 38
- Buffalo – Frerotte 1 pass from Reich (Christie kick)
- Buffalo – Lofton 17 pass from Reich (Christie kick)
- Buffalo – FG Christie 43
- Buffalo – Gardner 1 run (Christie kick)

== Awards, honors, and records ==
- Bill Cowher, AP NFL Coach of the Year
- Bill Cowher, Sporting News NFL Coach of the Year
