= 1991 Cleveland Browns season =

46th season in franchise history

- Owner: Art Modell
- General manager: Ernie Accorsi
- Head coach: Bill Belichick
- Defensive coordinator: Nick Saban
- Home stadium: Cleveland Municipal Stadium

Results
- Record: 6–10
- Division place: 3rd AFC Central
- Playoffs: Did not qualify
- Pro Bowlers: DT Michael Dean Perry

The 1991 Cleveland Browns season was the team's 42nd season with the National Football League. On August 5, Browns founder Paul Brown died at the age of 82.

1991 was the first of five seasons in Cleveland for head coach Bill Belichick. Under Belichick, the Browns managed a 6–10 record, while finishing in third place in the AFC Central. The Browns won their first game of the season by beating Belichick's future team, the Patriots.

== Offseason ==
=== NFL draft ===
1991 Cleveland Browns draft
Round	Pick	Player	Position	College	Notes
1	2	Eric Turner *	Safety	UCLA	
2	29	Ed King	Guard	Auburn	
3	57	James Jones	Defensive tackle	Northern Iowa	
4	85	Pio Sagapolutele	Defensive tackle	San Diego State	
6	141	Michael Jackson	Wide receiver	Southern Mississippi	
8	197	Frank Conover	Defensive tackle	Syracuse	
9	225	Raymond Irvin	Defensive back	Central Florida	
9	239	Shawn Wiggins	Wide receiver	Wyoming	
10	252	Brian Greenfield	Punter	Pittsburgh	
11	280	Todd Jones	Offensive tackle	Henderson State	
12	308	Elijah Austin	Defensive tackle	North Carolina State	
Made roster * Made at least one Pro Bowl during career

=== Undrafted free agents ===
1991 undrafted free agents of note
Player	Position	College
Nathaniel Bolton	Wide receiver	Mississippi College

== Trades made ==
- Traded Bob Buczkowski to Seattle Seahawks for 9x16

== Personnel ==
=== Staff ===
1991 Cleveland Browns staff
Front office: Owner and president – Art Modell; Executive vice-president of football operations – Ernie Accorsi; Director of pro personnel – Michael Lombardi; Director of college scouting – Dom Anile; Head coaches: Head coach – Bill Belichick; Offensive coaches: Quarterbacks – Gary Tranquill; Running backs – Steve Crosby; Receivers – Richard Mann; Offensive line – Hal Hunter; Offense assistant – Ernie Adams	Defensive coaches: Defensive coordinator – Nick Saban; Defensive line – John Mitchell; Outside linebackers – Don Blackmon; Inside linebackers – Jim Bates; Special teams coaches: Special teams – Scott O'Brien; Coaches' assistant – Phil Savage; Strength and conditioning: Strength and conditioning – Jerry Simmons

=== Roster ===
1991 Cleveland Browns roster
Quarterbacks (QB): 19 Bernie Kosar; 17 Todd Philcox; Running backs (RB): 23 Randy Baldwin; 33 Leroy Hoard; 34 Kevin Mack FB; 20 Joe Morris KR; 44 Lee Rouson; Wide receivers (WR): 86 Brian Brennan; 1 Michael Jackson; 83 Tyrone Shavers; 84 Webster Slaughter; Tight ends (TE): 81 Scott Galbraith; 48 Brian Kinchen LS	Offensive linemen (OL): 61 Mike Baab C; 74 Paul Farren T; 69 Dan Fike T; 66 Tony Jones T; 68 Ed King G; 70 John Rienstra G; 67 Chris Thome C; 65 Rick Trumbull T; Defensive linemen (DL): 90 Rob Burnett; 96 James Jones DT; 97 Ernie Logan DT; 92 Michael Dean Perry DT; 98 Anthony Pleasant DE; 75 Pio Sagapolutele DE; 91 John Thornton DT	Linebackers (LB): 58 David Brandon OLB; 52 Richard Brown MLB; 99 Johnie Cooks OLB; 53 Cedric Figaro MLB; 59 Mike Johnson MLB; 57 Clay Matthews OLB; 50 Van Waiters OLB; Defensive backs (DB): 37 Harlon Barnett SS; 42 Latin Berry CB; 36 Stephen Braggs CB; 38 Odie Harris SS; 39 Randy Hilliard CB; 41 Alfred Jackson CB; 43 Joe King FS; 31 Frank Minnifield CB; 22 Vince Newsome FS; 29 Eric Turner FS; Special teams (ST): 11 Brian Hansen P; 3 Matt Stover K	Practice squad: 56 Lonnie Brockman LB; -- Newt Harrell G; 43 Archie Herring RB; -- Pete Lucas T; 35 Charlie Oliver S; Reserve: 71 Leonard Burton C (IR); 26 Raymond Clayborn CB (IR); 94 Frank Conover DT (IR); 27 Derrick Douglas RB (IR); 13 Jeff Francis QB (IR); 30 Thane Gash S (PUP); 8 Brian Greenfield P (IR); 23 Mark Harper CB (IR); -- Ray Irvin CB (IR); 40 Lynn James WR (IR); 88 Reggie Langhorne WR (IR); 49 Bruce McGonnigal TE (IR); 21 Eric Metcalf (IR); 89 Mike Oliphant WR (IR); 80 Danny Peebles (IR); 87 John Talley TE (IR); 85 Lawyer Tillman TE (PUP); 93 Mike Wise DE (IR); 78 Rob Woods T (IR); 47 active, 19 inactive, 5 practice squad Rookies in italics

== Preseason ==
Week	Date	Opponent	Result	Record	Venue	Attendance
1	August 5	Tampa Bay Buccaneers	L 10–23	0–1	Cleveland Municipal Stadium	64,753
2	August 10	New York Giants	W 16–10	1–1	Cleveland Municipal Stadium	54,445
3	August 16	at Washington Redskins	W 24–21 (OT)	2–1	RFK Stadium	51,137
4	August 23	at Minnesota Vikings	L 7–31	2–2	Hubert H. Humphrey Metrodome	45,925

== Regular season ==
=== Schedule ===
Week	Date	Opponent	Result	Record	Venue	Attendance
1	September 1	Dallas Cowboys	**L** 14–26	0–1	Cleveland Municipal Stadium	78,860
2	September 8	at New England Patriots	**W** 20–0	1–1	Sullivan Stadium	35,377
3	September 15	**Cincinnati Bengals**	**W** 14–13	2–1	Cleveland Municipal Stadium	78,269
4	September 22	at New York Giants	**L** 10–13	2–2	Giants Stadium	75,891
5	Bye					
6	October 6	New York Jets	**L** 14–17	2–3	Cleveland Municipal Stadium	71,042
7	October 13	at Washington Redskins	**L** 17–42	2–4	RFK Stadium	54,715
8	October 20	at San Diego Chargers	**W** 30–24	3–4	Jack Murphy Stadium	48,440
9	October 27	**Pittsburgh Steelers**	**W** 17–14	4–4	Cleveland Municipal Stadium	78,285
10	November 3	at **Cincinnati Bengals**	**L** 21–23	4–5	Riverfront Stadium	55,077
11	November 10	Philadelphia Eagles	**L** 30–32	4–6	Cleveland Municipal Stadium	72,086
12	November 17	at **Houston Oilers**	**L** 24–28	4–7	Houston Astrodome	58,155
13	November 24	Kansas City Chiefs	**W** 20–15	5–7	Cleveland Municipal Stadium	63,991
14	December 1	at Indianapolis Colts	**W** 31–0	6–7	Hoosier Dome	57,539
15	December 8	Denver Broncos	**L** 7–17	6–8	Cleveland Municipal Stadium	73,539
16	December 15	**Houston Oilers**	**L** 14–17	6–9	Cleveland Municipal Stadium	55,680
17	December 22	at **Pittsburgh Steelers**	**L** 10–17	6–10	Three Rivers Stadium	47,070
Note: Intra-division opponents are in **bold** text.

=== Standings ===
AFC Central
	W	L	T	PCT	DIV	CONF	PF	PA	STK
^{(3)} Houston Oilers	11	5	0	.688	5–1	10–2	386	251	L1
Pittsburgh Steelers	7	9	0	.438	4–2	7–5	292	344	W2
Cleveland Browns	6	10	0	.375	2–4	6–6	293	298	L3
Cincinnati Bengals	3	13	0	.188	1–5	2–10	263	435	W1

=== Season summary ===
==== Week 17 at Steelers ====
Week Seventeen: Cleveland Browns (6–9) at Pittsburgh Steelers (6–9)

Quarter	1	2	3	4	Total
Browns	0	3	0	7	**10**
**Steelers**	3	0	7	7	**17**

at Three Rivers Stadium, Pittsburgh, Pennsylvania

- Date: December 22
- Game time: 1:00 p.m. EDT
- Game weather: Sunny, 39 °F (4 °C)
- Game attendance: 47,070
- Referee: Pat Haggerty
- TV announcers (NBC): Don Criqui and Bob Trumpy
- Box Score, Box Score

Game information

First quarter

- PIT – Gary Anderson 34-yard field goal, 0:59. Steelers 3–0.

Second quarter

- CLE – Matt Stover 19-yard field goal, 6:18. Tie 3–3.

Third quarter

- PIT – Dwight Stone 65-yard pass from Bubby Brister (Gary Anderson kick), 0:16. Steelers 10–3.

Fourth quarter

- PIT – Richard Shelton 57-yard interception return (Gary Anderson kick), 9:28. Steelers 17–3.
- CLE – Michael Jackson 27-yard pass from Bernie Kosar (Matt Stover kick), 6:56. Steelers 17–10.

Top passers

- CLE – Bernie Kosar – 28/49, 335 yards, TD, 3 INT
- PIT – Bubby Brister – 7/26, 113 yards, TD

Top rushers

- CLE – Joe Morris – 12 rushes, 26 yards
- PIT – Tim Worley – 16 rushes, 84 yards

Top receivers

- CLE – Webster Slaughter – 11 receptions, 138 yards
- PIT – Dwight Stone – 3 receptions, 76 yards, TD
