= NFL scoring leaders =

NFL scoring leaders may refer to:

- List of NFL annual scoring leaders
- List of NFL career scoring leaders
