= Leroy Thompson (running back) =

American football player (born 1968)

No. 34, 36, 31
- Position: Running back

Personal information
- Born: February 3, 1969 (age 57); Knoxville, Tennessee, U.S.
- Listed height: 5 ft 11 in (1.80 m)
- Listed weight: 216 lb (98 kg)

Career information
- High school: Austin-East (Knoxville)
- College: Penn State
- NFL draft: 1991: 6th round, 158th overall pick

Career history
- Pittsburgh Steelers (1991–1993); New England Patriots (1994); Kansas City Chiefs (1995); Tampa Bay Buccaneers (1996)

Career NFL statistics
- Rushing yards: 1,390
- Rushing average: 3.4
- Total touchdowns: 11
- Stats at Pro Football Reference

Ulys Leroy Thompson (born February 3, 1969) is an American former professional football player who was a running back for six seasons in the National Football League (NFL), the first three with the Pittsburgh Steelers, and then one apiece with the New England Patriots, Kansas City Chiefs, and Tampa Bay Buccaneers. He was an excellent receiver out of the backfield, accumulating 153 career receptions, including a career best of 65 in 1994 with the Patriots. He played college football for the Penn State Nittany Lions.

After retiring from the NFL, Thompson returned to his hometown of Knoxville, Tennessee, where he works as a developer and community advocate.

== Early life ==
Thompson was raised in the Five Points neighborhood of East Knoxville, one of four children of Ulysses and Edna Thompson. He played high school football at Austin-East, where he rushed for 5,987 career yards on offense, and registered a state-record 41 career interceptions on defense. During his senior year in 1986, he carried 196 times for 1,980 yards and 35 touchdowns, leading the Roadrunners to a 15–0 season and the state championship. He also played basketball, winning state tournament MVP honors after leading Austin-East to a 33–1 record and the state title in 1985.

Following his senior season, Thompson was named to the All-American teams of several publications, including Parade and USA Today. Considered one of the top ten football prospects in the nation, he held offers from 125 schools, and was described as the "most highly recruited football player in Knoxville history." By February 1987, he had narrowed his choice to Penn State and his hometown school, Tennessee. He chose Penn State for the Lions' training facilities and winning tradition (Penn State was coming off a national championship season), as well as the opportunity to play early.

== College career ==
Playing part of the 1987 season with a hand injury, Thompson rushed just 20 times for 57 yards as star running back Blair Thomas carried most of Penn State's rushing load. With Thomas injured during the 1987 Citrus Bowl, Thompson, splitting time with fellow freshman Gary Brown, rushed six times for 55 yards and finished with 201 all-purpose yards, and was named Penn State's offensive player of the game.

Thompson continued splitting time with Brown in the backfield during his sophomore year in 1988, as Thomas missed the season with an injury. He finished the year with 108 carries for 401 yards, caught 8 passes for 65 yards, and scored three touchdowns. After Thomas returned for the 1989 season, Thompson switched to fullback. In the 1989 Holiday Bowl, he carried 14 times for 69 yards, and scored on runs of 16 yards and 14 yards, to help Penn State defeat BYU, 50–39.

Thompson returned to tailback for his senior season in 1990, and was elected one of the team's captains. He scored four touchdowns, one shy of the school record, in Penn State's win over Rutgers, carried 18 times for 125 yards in the Lions' win over Temple, and compiled 139 all-purpose yards in the Lions' 24–21 upset of top-ranked Notre Dame. In spite of missing part of the season with a foot injury, he finished the year with 152 carries for 573 yards, and 20 receptions for 245 yards. During his career at Penn State, Thompson compiled 1,215 rushing yards and 416 receiving yards, and scored 12 touchdowns. He graduated with a degree in speech communications.

== Professional career ==
Thompson was selected by the Pittsburgh Steelers in the sixth round of the 1991 NFL draft, Thompson impressed Steelers coach Chuck Noll with his ability to read deep routes and catch the ball out of the backfield. He spent most of his rookie season competing with Warren Williams and Tim Worley for playing time. After Steelers tailback Barry Foster returned from injury in 1992 and won the starting spot, Thompson developed primarily into a third-down threat.

In October 1993, Thompson, playing for the injured Foster, carried 16 times for 101 yards in the Steelers' win over New Orleans. After Foster suffered another injury a few weeks later, Thompson started six of the final seven games of the season. He carried 30 times for 108 yards in a Monday Night Football win over Buffalo, rushed 22 times for 82 yards, including a 36-yard run that set up the Steelers' first touchdown, in a 17–14 win over New England, and tallied 81 rushing yards and 61 receiving yards in Pittsburgh's 21–20 win over Miami. He finished the season with over one thousand all-purpose yards, including 763 rushing yards and 259 receiving yards.

Prior to the start of the 1994 season, Thompson was traded to New England, where Coach Bill Parcells was seeking a running back with receiving ability to complement tailback Marion Butts. He finished the season with 65 receptions, the third-highest total on the team. He caught a touchdown pass that helped ignite the Patriots' 26-20 comeback win over Minnesota, scored two touchdowns in a key late-season win over Indianapolis, and scored the lone touchdown in New England's 13–3 win over Chicago that allowed the Patriots to clinch a playoff spot. In New England's loss to Cleveland in the first round of the playoffs, Thompson scored a second-quarter touchdown that temporarily gave his team the lead.

Determined to compete for a starting tailback spot, Thompson signed with Kansas City in July 1995. He saw little playing time, however, as the veteran back Marcus Allen was tapped as the Chiefs' primary rusher. He signed with Tampa Bay in July 1996, but again saw little playing time during the season.

=== NFL career statistics ===
Note: G = Games played; Att = Rushing attempts; Yds = Rushing yards; Avg = Average yards per carry; Long = Longest rush; Rush TD = Rushing touchdowns; Rec = Receptions; Yds = Receiving yards; Avg = Average yards per reception; Long = Longest reception; Rec TD = Receiving touchdowns

Year	Team	GP	Att	Yds	Avg	Long	Rush TD	Rec	Yds	Avg	Long	Rec TD
1991	Pittsburgh Steelers	13	20	60	3.0	14	0	14	118	8.4	32	0
1992	Pittsburgh Steelers	15	35	157	4.5	25	1	22	278	12.6	29	2
1993	Pittsburgh Steelers	15	205	763	3.7	36	3	38	259	6.8	28	1
1994	New England Patriots	16	102	312	3.1	13	2	65	465	7.2	27	5
1995	Kansas City Chiefs	16	28	73	2.6	10	0	9	37	4.1	7	0
1996	Tampa Bay Buccaneers	5	14	25	1.8	10	0	5	36	7.2	12	0
Career Totals		80	404	1,390	3.4	36	6	153	1,193	7.8	32	5

== Post-playing career ==
While still playing in the NFL, Thompson established the Team Dream Foundation, which provided gang awareness and drug awareness programs for inner city youths. Keeping a promise he had made to himself, he returned to Knoxville following his playing days to help the city's struggling urban neighborhoods. He served as executive director of the Wesley House, a Christian outreach ministry, from 1999 to early 2003.

In late 2002, Thompson co-founded a development firm, BDT Development and Management, with Knoxville real estate developer Bob Talbott. Thompson sought to draw self-sustaining businesses to Knoxville's inner city neighborhoods to create jobs, as well as provide opportunities for minority contractors. Under Thompson's guidance, BDT developed the 32,000-square foot Five Points Village Plaza off Martin Luther King, Jr., Boulevard, near his old neighborhood, and the 65,000-square foot Cherokee Health Systems complex on Western Avenue.

In September 2012, Governor Bill Haslam appointed Thompson as East Tennessee Regional Director of the Tennessee Department of Economic and Community Development.

== Personal life ==
Thompson and his wife, Nikitia, have three children: Tionna, Brooke, and Dezmond.
