= Merril Hoge =

American football player and analyst (born 1965)

No. 33
- Position: Running back

Personal information
- Born: January 26, 1965 (age 61); Pocatello, Idaho, U.S.
- Listed height: 6 ft 2 in (1.88 m)
- Listed weight: 230 lb (104 kg)

Career information
- High school: Highland (Pocatello)
- College: Idaho State (1983–1986)
- NFL draft: 1987: 10th round, 261st overall pick

Career history
- Pittsburgh Steelers (1987–1993); Chicago Bears (1994)

Career NFL statistics
- Rushing yards: 3,139
- Rushing average: 3.8
- Rushing touchdowns: 21
- Stats at Pro Football Reference

Merril DuAine Hoge (/ˈhɒdʒ/; born January 26, 1965) is an American former professional football player who was a running back for eight seasons in the National Football League (NFL) for the Pittsburgh Steelers and Chicago Bears. He played college football for the Idaho State Bengals and was selected by the Steelers in the 10th round of the 1987 NFL draft. Hoge retired from playing after the 1994 season. Since 1996 he had been a football analyst for ESPN television. Hoge, along with fellow longtime NFL Matchup analyst Ron Jaworski, were laid off after wide ESPN cuts in April 2017.

== Early life ==
Born and raised in Pocatello, Idaho, Hoge graduated from its Highland High School in 1983. He stayed in town to play college football for Idaho State University in the Big Sky Conference, and was a three-time all-conference selection (1984–86) at running back for the Bengals. In 1985, Hoge set an NCAA record with 2,113 all-purpose yards, an average of 192.1 per game, including a school record 1,041 rushing yards. He finished his college career with an NCAA record 5,453 all-purpose yards and 31 touchdowns.

== Professional football career ==
Pre-draft measurables
Height	Weight	Arm length	Hand span	40-yard dash	10-yard split	20-yard split	20-yard shuttle	Vertical jump	Broad jump	Bench press
6 ft 0 5/8 in (1.84 m)	210 lb (95 kg)	30 in (0.76 m)	8 1/2 in (0.22 m)	4.89 s	1.64 s	2.81 s	4.09 s	28.5 in (0.72 m)	8 ft 4 in (2.54 m)	15 reps
All values from NFL Combine

The Pittsburgh Steelers selected Hoge in the 10th round of the 1987 NFL draft with the 261st pick overall. After seven seasons with the Steelers, Hoge signed with the Chicago Bears in 1994, but played in only five games with six carries and 13 receptions.

During a road game in 1994 against the Kansas City Chiefs, Hoge suffered a concussion and, five days later, the team doctor approved him to resume playing during a telephone call without examining him to determine if he had recovered; he was still suffering post-concussion symptoms.

Hoge sustained another concussion several weeks later, and had to be resuscitated after he stopped breathing. He spent 48 hours in the intensive-care unit and was forced to retire due to brain injury. Hoge had to learn to read again and experienced memory loss, confusion and headaches. He later sued the Bears team doctor and won a $1.55 million judgment. After discovery the case was lost on appeal. Steelers team physician, neurosurgeon Joseph Maroon, had established a baseline for evaluating cognitive effects of concussions, so when Hoge continued to experience impairment after several weeks, he returned to Dr. Maroon for a new evaluation. Maroon's team found a "marked disparency [sic]" (likely meaning a notable disparity), informing Hoge that further concussions would risk permanent brain damage. Upon receiving this information, Hoge retired.

In his career, Hoge gained 3,139 rushing yards and 2,133 receiving yards, scoring 34 touchdowns. While playing fullback in the Steelers offense, he scored 10 touchdowns in 1990.

== NFL career statistics ==
Legend
**Bold**	Career high

=== Regular season ===
Year	Team	Games		Rushing					Receiving				
Year	Team	GP	GS	Att	Yds	Avg	Lng	TD	Rec	Yds	Avg	Lng	TD
1987	PIT	13	0	3	8	2.7	5	0	7	97	**13.9**	27	1
1988	PIT	**16**	8	170	705	4.1	20	3	**50**	**487**	9.7	**40**	3
1989	PIT	**16**	**16**	186	621	3.3	31	**8**	34	271	8.0	22	0
1990	PIT	**16**	15	**203**	**772**	3.8	**41**	7	40	342	8.6	27	3
1991	PIT	**16**	**16**	165	610	3.7	24	2	49	379	7.7	25	1
1992	PIT	**16**	11	41	150	3.7	15	0	28	231	8.3	20	1
1993	PIT	**16**	13	51	249	**4.9**	30	1	33	247	7.5	18	**4**
1994	CHI	5	5	6	24	4.0	8	0	13	79	6.1	11	0
		114	84	825	3,139	3.8	41	21	254	2,133	8.4	40	13

=== Playoffs ===
Year	Team	Games		Rushing					Receiving				
Year	Team	GP	GS	Att	Yds	Avg	Lng	TD	Rec	Yds	Avg	Lng	TD
1989	PIT	**2**	**2**	**33**	**220**	**6.7**	**49**	**2**	**11**	**86**	7.8	19	0
1992	PIT	1	1	0	0	0.0	0	0	0	0	0.0	0	0
1993	PIT	1	1	6	27	4.5	9	0	3	43	**14.3**	**32**	0
		4	4	39	247	6.3	49	2	14	129	9.2	32	0

== Broadcast career ==
In 1996, Hoge was hired as an on-air analyst for ESPN. Hoge is a well-known short-tie aficionado.

Hoge was laid off from ESPN in May 2017. In December 2017 "Your Call Football", a fan play-calling competition, hired Hoge as one of its two football coaches, joining former Green Bay Packers head coach Mike Sherman.

== Personal life ==
=== Surgery ===
Hoge injured his shoulder in an automobile accident in June 2002 and had an operation to repair a torn ligament. During an examination six months after surgery, Hoge told his doctor, Jim Bradley, also the Steelers' team physician, about a recurring back pain. Bradley began ordering tests to determine the cause. On February 14, 2003, Hoge was diagnosed with stage II Non-Hodgkin lymphoma. He had the first of six chemotherapy treatments on February 28.

It is destroyable, it is beatable. You have everything in you to do it. The mind is a powerful thing. There is no doubt, come May, I'll be cancer free; five years after that, I'll be cured. Fifty years or whatever time I have left after that, it will be the platform I stand for. I'll be a better man. This has been a blessing.

Soon after treatment began, Stanley Marks, Hoge's oncologist at the University of Pittsburgh Medical Center, gave him a 75-80% chance of prolonged remission.

On October 31, 2015, one month after he had surgery to repair an enlarged aorta, Merril Hoge returned at work at ESPN on NFL Matchup.

=== Family ===
Hoge lives in Fort Thomas, Kentucky with his son Beau (born 1997) and daughter Kori (born 1993). Fort Thomas is a suburb of Campbell County, Kentucky, across the river from Cincinnati, Ohio. Fellow retired NFL player, Cris Collinsworth, also calls Fort Thomas home. When Hoge was playing for the Pittsburgh Steelers, his wife Toni, who had previously resided there, did not want to live in Pittsburgh. Accordingly, he deferred to her choice and Fort Thomas became their home. Toni and Merril are now divorced. Beau was a quarterback and running back for Brigham Young University from 2015 to 2018. Hoge's nephew, Tristen Hoge, was a rookie offensive lineman for the New York Jets practice squad after being undrafted in 2021.

His mother died when he was 19.

== Philanthropy ==
Hoge has served on the board of directors of the Highmark Caring Foundation since the early 1990s. He also ran the Hoge-Bruener-Ward Celebrity Golf Classic for over ten years.
