= Adrian Cooper =

American football player (born 1968)

No. 87, 49
- Position: Tight end

Personal information
- Born: April 27, 1968 (age 58); Denver, Colorado, U.S.
- Listed height: 6 ft 5 in (1.96 m)
- Listed weight: 255 lb (116 kg)

Career information
- High school: Denver (CO) South
- College: Oklahoma
- NFL draft: 1991: 4th round, 103rd overall pick

Career history
- Pittsburgh Steelers (1991–1993); Minnesota Vikings (1994–1995); San Francisco 49ers (1996)

Awards and highlights
- PFWA All-Rookie Team (1991); Joe Greene Great Performance Award (1991)

Career NFL statistics
- Receptions: 87
- Receiving yards: 1,037
- Touchdowns: 5
- Stats at Pro Football Reference

Adrian Cooper Jr. (born April 27, 1968) is an American former professional football player who was a tight end in the National Football League (NFL). He played six seasons in the NFL beginning with the Pittsburgh Steelers from 1991 to 1993, Minnesota Vikings from 1994 to 1995, and San Francisco 49ers in 1996.

== College career ==
Cooper played collegiately for the Oklahoma Sooners, lettering in 1988, 1989 and 1990 as the Sooners adjusted to life after sanctions that ended the legendary Barry Switzer Era in Norman.

As the Sooners were primarily a run-based Wishbone offense, Cooper brought value to their attack as a blocker. "I had to block well," he said.

Cooper's redshirt senior season of 1990 proved to be his best, as he caught 13 passes for 301 yards, complete with 23.2 yards per catch and 2 touchdowns. He either led or tied for the team lead in all four categories. Despite being on probation, the Sooners finished with an 8–3 record, finished 17th in the AP poll.

== Professional career ==
=== Pittsburgh Steelers ===
Cooper was selected in the fourth round of the 1991 NFL draft by the Steelers with the 103rd overall pick, and could only guarantee the third spot on the depth chart at tight end in the preseason.

However, he was pressed into service as a rookie due to injuries to Eric Green and Mike Mularkey, and acquitted himself well as a rookie. Originally a third-string tight end, Cooper caught 11 passes for 147 yards and two touchdowns. He was eventually named to the PFWA All-Rookie Team for 1991, and was selected by Steelers as the Joe Greene Great Performance Award Winner.

Cooper followed up his rookie performance by getting more snaps in 1992 as a starting tight end for the AFC Central Champions. Cooper recorded a career-best in touchdown receptions with 3.

Green returned to form in 1993, however, and Cooper caught just 9 passes. This total didn't include his final reception as a Steeler: a 10-yard touchdown pass from Neil O'Donnell in the 1993 AFC Wild-Card Playoff Game loss to the Kansas City Chiefs.

He later said that his blocking acumen at Oklahoma had served him well in becoming a valued member of the Steelers offense. "When I came in it was no surprise to the defense when they ran the ball to my side," he said. "They knew what I was there for. It did help me in the passing game though. Sometimes we’d run play action and that gave me the advantage I needed to get open. Otherwise I’d never have gotten open!"

=== Minnesota Vikings ===
Moving on to Minnesota in 1994, Cooper had his best season as a professional, catching 32 balls for 363 yards and starting 11 out of the 12 games he played. He then started 13 games in 1995, but caught just 18 passes.

=== San Francisco 49ers ===
Cooper wound up his NFL career with the 49ers in 1996, catching a single pass for 11 yards. His final reception was a 17-year-yard first down catch in the 49ers' 14-0 NFC Wild Card Playoff win over the Philadelphia Eagles.

For his six-year career, Cooper tallied 87 receptions for 1,037 yards and five touchdowns.

== NFL career statistics ==
Legend
**Bold**	Career high

Year	Team	Games		Receiving				
Year	Team	GP	GS	Rec	Yds	Avg	Lng	TD
1991	PIT	**16**	8	11	147	**13.4**	**47**	2
1992	PIT	**16**	**15**	16	197	12.3	27	**3**
1993	PIT	14	3	9	112	12.4	38	0
1994	MIN	12	11	**32**	**363**	11.3	34	0
1995	MIN	13	13	18	207	11.5	41	0
1996	SFO	6	0	1	11	11.0	11	0
		77	50	87	1,037	11.9	47	5
