= Gary Anderson (placekicker) =

South African American football player (born 1959)

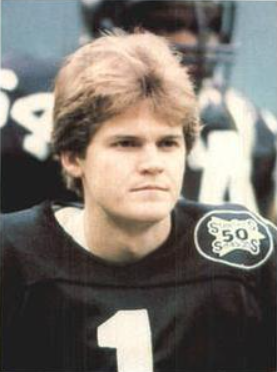
- Anderson with the Pittsburgh Steelers in 1982

No. 1
- Position: Placekicker

Personal information
- Born: 16 July 1959 (age 67); Parys, Orange Free State, Union of South Africa
- Listed height: 5 ft 11 in (1.80 m)
- Listed weight: 193 lb (88 kg)

Career information
- High school: Brettonwood (Durban, South Africa)
- College: Syracuse (1978–1981)
- NFL draft: 1982: 7th round, 171st overall pick

Career history
- Buffalo Bills (1982)*; Pittsburgh Steelers (1982–1994); Philadelphia Eagles (1995–1996); San Francisco 49ers (1997); Minnesota Vikings (1998–2002); Tennessee Titans (2003–2004)
- * Offseason or practice squad member only

Awards and highlights
- First-team All-Pro (1998); Second-team All-Pro (1983); 4× Pro Bowl (1983, 1985, 1993, 1998); NFL scoring leader (1998); NFL 1980s All-Decade Team; NFL 1990s All-Decade Team; Golden Toe Award (1998); PFWA All-Rookie Team (1982); Pittsburgh Steelers All-Time Team; First-team All-American (1981); First-team All-East (1981)

Career NFL statistics
- Field goals: 538/672 (80.1%)
- Extra points: 820/827 (99.2%)
- Points scored: 2,434
- Stats at Pro Football Reference

Gary Allan Anderson (born 16 July 1959) is a South African former professional American football placekicker who played in the National Football League (NFL) for 23 seasons. He spent the majority of his career with the Pittsburgh Steelers and is also known for his Minnesota Vikings tenure. Joining the league in 1982, he earned four Pro Bowl selections and one first-team All-Pro honor. Anderson was also named to the NFL's second All-Decade teams of the 1980s and 1990s, as well as the Steelers All-Time Team.

With the Vikings in 1998, Anderson became the first NFL kicker to convert every field goal and extra point in the regular season. During the postseason, however, he missed a critical field goal in the 1998 NFC Championship Game, which is often attributed with the Vikings' defeat. Anderson continued his NFL career for six more seasons until retiring in 2004. He ranks third in games played (353), points scored (2,434), and field goals made (538) and is also the Steelers' all-time leading scorer at 1,343 points.

== Early life ==
Gary Anderson was born in Parys, South Africa and grew up in Durban. His father, the Reverend Douglas Anderson, played professional soccer in England. His mother was South African. Shortly after Gary graduated from high school at Brettonwood High, Reverend Anderson left South Africa and moved his family to the United States.

Anderson had hoped to follow in his father's footsteps and become a professional soccer player in Europe. On his third day after immigrating to the United States, he had been given a few American footballs to kick. He went to a local high school football field in Downingtown, Pennsylvania to see what kicking this type of ball was like. Anderson grew up playing rugby and was drop-kicking them from the 50-yard line. A high school football coach and friend of Dick Vermeil watched Anderson and arranged a tryout with the Philadelphia Eagles the next day. Anderson was aged only 18, having just graduated high school, so at the tryout there were university scouts present, all four of whom offered scholarships on the spot. Anderson chose Syracuse after they promised him that he would also be able to play on the school's soccer team. He played for the Syracuse soccer team in 1978 and 1979, scoring nineteen goals, before devoting himself to football his junior and senior seasons.

== Professional career ==
After graduating from Syracuse, he was drafted as a placekicker by the Buffalo Bills in the 1982 NFL draft but was cut before the season began. Within a few days, he signed as a free agent with the Pittsburgh Steelers and spent the following 13 seasons in Pittsburgh. For the 1995 and 1996 seasons, Anderson signed as a free agent with the Philadelphia Eagles. He then spent the 1997 season as a member of the San Francisco 49ers.

He also had the distinction of wearing a one-bar facemask throughout his career, even though the NFL outlawed their use prior to his final season in 2004 – he, along with Arizona Cardinals punter Scott Player, were afforded a grandfather clause.

In 1998, Anderson signed with the Minnesota Vikings and converted all 35 of his attempted field goals and all 59 extra points in regular season play, becoming the first placekicker to finish the regular season with a 100% success rate on both field goals and extra points. His only miss of the season came in the 1998 NFC Championship Game against the Atlanta Falcons. The Falcons ended up winning the game in overtime sending them to Super Bowl XXXIII. Anderson continued to play for the Vikings until 2002. In 2000, while with the Vikings, Anderson surpassed the legendary George Blanda to become the NFL's All-Time Leading Scorer and held the record upon his retirement from the NFL in 2004. Anderson played his final two seasons with the Tennessee Titans in the 2003 and 2004 seasons. Anderson played 23 years in the NFL; only Adam Vinatieri (24 seasons), Morten Andersen (25 seasons) and George Blanda (26 seasons) have had longer playing tenures; Additionally, Vinatieri and Andersen are the only players to play in more career games than Anderson. Although not officially retired, Anderson's number 1 has also not been reissued by Steelers since his departure from the team.

There are a number of coincidences between Anderson and his contemporary, Morten Andersen. Anderson and Morten Andersen have nearly identical last names, were born within a year of one another outside the United States (Morten was born in Denmark), came to the United States as teenagers, were both drafted in 1982, had long and successful NFL careers throughout the 1980s and 1990s (and both retiring in the 2000s decade), and hold first or second place in a number of NFL records for scoring, field goals, and longevity. Their overall accuracy is also nearly identical; their career percentage being within .5% of each other on both FGs and PATs. In the 1998 NFC Championship Game, Anderson missed a field goal for the Minnesota Vikings before Morten Andersen successfully converted his winning kick for the Atlanta Falcons (which sent them to Super Bowl XXXIII, their first Super Bowl appearance), both from the same distance as well (38 yards). On 16 December 2006, Morten passed Anderson to become the all-time leading scorer in NFL history. The following weekend, 24 December 2006, Morten again passed Anderson to become the NFL's career leader in field goals made.

== NFL career statistics ==
Legend
	NFL record
	Led the league
**Bold**	Career high
Underline	Incomplete data

=== Regular season ===
General			Field goals					PATs			Kickoffs			Points
Season	Team	GP	FGM	FGA	FG%	Blck	Long	XPM	XPA	XP%	KO	Avg	TBs	Pts
1982	PIT	9	10	12	83.3%	0	48	22	22	**100.0%**	-	-	-	52
1983	PIT	16	27	31	87.1	0	49	38	39	97.4%	-	-	-	119
1984	PIT	16	24	32	75.0%	0	**55**	45	45	**100.0%**	-	-	-	117
1985	PIT	16	33	**42**	78.6%	0	52	40	40	**100.0%**	-	-	-	139
1986	PIT	16	21	32	65.6%	0	45	32	32	**100.0%**	-	-	-	95
1987	PIT	12	22	27	81.5%	0	42	21	21	**100.0%**	-	-	-	87
1988	PIT	16	28	36	77.8%	0	42	34	35	97.1%	-	-	-	118
1989	PIT	16	21	30	70.0%	0	49	28	28	**100.0%**	-	-	-	91
1990	PIT	16	20	25	80.0%	0	48	32	32	**100.0%**	-	-	-	92
1991	PIT	16	23	33	69.7%	1	54	31	31	**100.0%**	69	**63.5**	**24**	100
1992	PIT	16	28	36	78.8%	**3**	49	29	31	93.5%	72	61.3	15	113
1993	PIT	16	28	30	93.3%	0	46	32	32	**100.0%**	**76**	61.9	19	116
1994	PIT	16	24	29	82.8%	0	50	32	32	**100.0%**	71	59.3	1	104
1995	PHI	16	22	30	73.3%	1	43	32	33	97.0%	72	62.2	10	98
1996	PHI	16	25	29	86.2%	1	46	40	40	**100.0%**	57	58.8	1	115
1997	SF	16	29	36	80.6%	2	51	38	38	**100.0%**	8	60.1	-	125
1998	MIN	16	**35**	35	**100.0%**	0	53	**59**	**59**	**100.0%**	2	54.0	-	**164**
1999	MIN	16	19	30	63.3%	**3**	44	46	46	**100.0%**	5	57.6	-	103
2000	MIN	16	22	23	95.7%	1	49	45	45	**100.0%**	24	55.1	1	111
2001	MIN	16	15	18	83.3%	0	44	29	30	96.7%	10	55.5	-	74
2002	MIN	14	18	23	78.3%	**3**	53	36	37	97.3%	8	55.5	-	90
2003	TEN	15	27	31	87.1%	0	43	42	42	**100.0%**	-	-	-	123
2004	TEN	15	32	37	86.5%	1	50	37	37	**100.0%**	-	-	-	88
Career		353	538	672	80.1%	18	55	820	827	99.2%	474	60.6	71	2,434

=== Postseason ===
General			Field goals					PATs			Kickoffs			Points
Season	Team	GP	FGM	FGA	FG%	Blck	Long	XPM	XPA	XP%	KO	Avg	TBs	Pts
1982	PIT	1	0	0	0.0%	0	-	4	4	100.0%	-	-	-	4
1983	PIT	1	1	1	100.0%	0	-	1	1	100.0%	-	-	-	4
1984	PIT	2	1	5	20.0%	0	-	7	7	100.0%	-	-	-	10
1989	PIT	2	**7**	**7**	100.0%	0	-	4	4	100.0%	-	-	-	**25**
1992	PIT	1	1	1	100.0%	0	-	-	-	-	2	**63.0**	-	3
1993	PIT	1	1	1	100.0%	0	-	3	3	100.0%	6	62.2	-	6
1994	PIT	2	4	4	100.0%	0	-	4	4	100.0%	10	56.0	-	16
1995	PHI	2	4	5	80.0%	0	-	7	7	100.0%	**13**	57.0	-	19
1996	PHI	1	-	1	-	-	-	-	-	-	1	53.0	-	-
1997	SFO	2	2	2	100.0%	0	-	6	6	100.0%	-	-	-	12
1998	MIN	2	4	5	80.0%	0	-	**8**	**8**	100.0%	-	-	-	16
1999	MIN	2	3	3	100.0%	0	-	5	5	100.0%	4	18.3	-	14
2000	MIN	1	2	2	100.0%	0	-	4	4	100.0%	-	-	-	10
2003	TEN	2	2	3	66.7%	0	-	4	4	100.0%	-	-	-	10
Career		22	32	40	80.0%	0	-	57	57	100.0%	36	53.5	-	149

=== NFL records ===
==== Single season ====
- Held record for Points in a single season with no touchdowns scored: 1998 (164 points, 59 PATs, 35 FGs)(broken by David Akers in 2011)
- Field goal percentage: 1998 (100%, 35/35)

==== Career ====
- Points: 3rd place, 2,434 Held record from 2000 (passing George Blanda) until 2006 (passed by Morten Andersen).
- FG made: 3rd place, 538.
- Extra points made: 4th place, 820.
- Games: 3rd place, 353.

==== Pittsburgh Steelers franchise records ====
- Points scored (career): 1,343

== Retirement ==
Anderson stayed with the Vikings until the 2002 season, then he joined the Tennessee Titans as a replacement for the injured Joe Nedney. Anderson connected on 27 of 31 field goal attempts in the regular season despite rotating periodically with punter Craig Hentrich, who booted four of five FGAs. In Tennessee's playoff win over Baltimore, Anderson connected on the winning 46-yard field goal in the final seconds, while in Tennessee's playoff loss to New England he missed on his one attempt.

After that season, Anderson was making plans to retire and turned down offers from several teams to come kick for them. In June 2004, Anderson, his wife, Kay, and sons Austin and Douglas moved to the Canadian Rocky Mountain town of Canmore, Alberta, Canada, just outside Banff National Park. When Nedney went down with another season-ending injury after the start of the 2004 season, Anderson again agreed to kick for the Titans, commuting from Canada each week. At the time of his retirement, Anderson was the last active player in the NFL to have played under former Steelers head coach Chuck Noll and the last remaining NFL player born in the 1950s.

Gary, and his wife, Kay, give back to their community and hosted an annual charity fundraiser called, "Dreams for Teams" in Canmore, Alberta with the mission of making a positive difference in the lives of Bow Valley school athletes, primarily through providing financial support, to assist them in becoming leaders, valuing teamwork, and achieving athletic and academic excellence. Each year the Andersons continue to give academic scholarships to local Canmore Athletes. Anderson coached the local boys high school soccer team in Canmore for over a decade. Anderson is passionate about fly fishing, and is a spokesman for the fly fishing industry.

== See also ==
- List of most consecutive starts and games played by National Football League players
- 1998 NFC Championship Game
