= Kevin Smith (safety) =

American football player (born 1967)

No. 41
- Position: Safety

Personal information
- Born: April 2, 1967 (age 59); Newport, Rhode Island, U.S.
- Listed height: 5 ft 11 in (1.80 m)
- Listed weight: 204 lb (93 kg)

Career information
- High school: Rogers (Newport)
- College: Rhode Island
- NFL draft: 1991: undrafted

Career history
- Pittsburgh Steelers (1991); Calgary Stampeders (1993)*
- * Offseason or practice squad member only
- Stats at Pro Football Reference

Kevin Anthony Smith (born April 2, 1967) is an American former professional football safety who played for the Pittsburgh Steelers of the National Football League (NFL). He played college football for the Rhode Island Rams.

== Early life ==
Kevin Anthony Smith was born on April 2, 1967, in Newport, Rhode Island. He attended Rogers High School in Newport.

== College career ==
Smith enrolled at the University of Rhode Island to play college football for the Rams. He was a four-year letterman from 1987 to 1990.

== Professional career ==
After going undrafted in the 1991 NFL draft, Smith signed with the Pittsburgh Steelers on April 25. He was released on August 26 but re-signed the next day. He played in all 16 games, starting one, at safety for the Steelers during the 1991 season. Smith also played special teams. He became a free agent after the 1991 season and re-signed with Pittsburgh on February 20, 1992. The Steelers allocated him to the World League of American Football to play for the Frankfurt Galaxy. However, he never played for the Galaxy. He was waived by the Steelers on August 31, 1992, after the final game of the 1992 preseason.

Smith signed with the Calgary Stampeders of the Canadian Football League (CFL) for the 1993 season. On June 25, 1993, it was reported that he had been released.
