= Matt Stover =

American football player (born 1968)

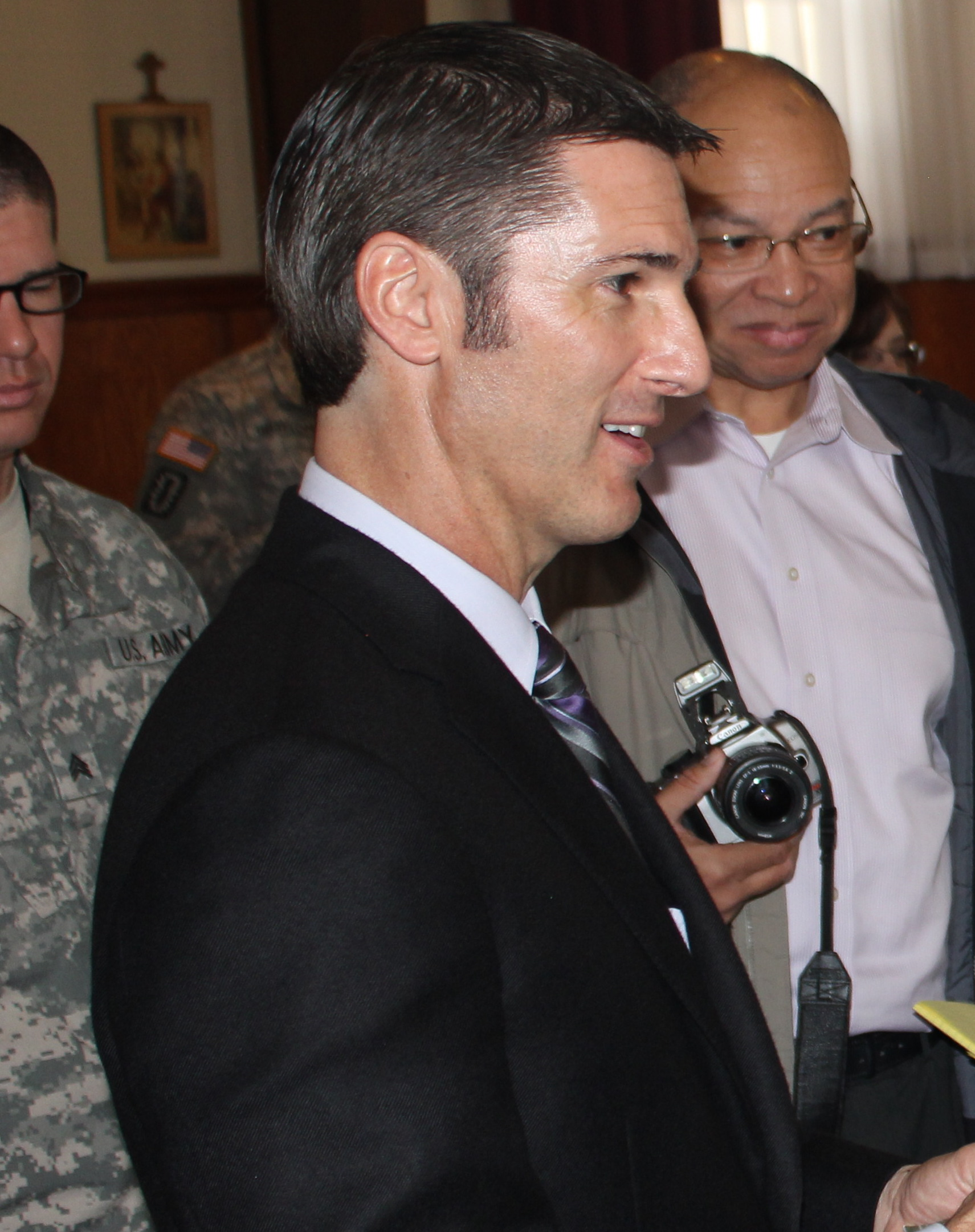
- Stover in 2013

No. 3
- Position: Placekicker

Personal information
- Born: January 27, 1968 (age 58); Dallas, Texas, U.S.
- Listed height: 5 ft 11 in (1.80 m)
- Listed weight: 180 lb (82 kg)

Career information
- High school: Lake Highlands (Dallas)
- College: Louisiana Tech (1986–1989)
- NFL draft: 1990: 12th round, 329th overall pick

Career history
- New York Giants (1990); Cleveland Browns (1991–1995); Baltimore Ravens (1996–2008); Indianapolis Colts (2009)

Awards and highlights
- 2× Super Bowl champion (XXV, XXXV); First-team All-Pro (2000); Second-team All-Pro (2006); Pro Bowl (2000); Golden Toe Award (2000); Baltimore Ravens Ring of Honor; FCS record: Most punts in a game: 16 (1988)

Career NFL statistics
- Field goals made: 471
- Field goals attempted: 563
- Field goal %: 83.7
- Longest field goal: 55
- Points scored: 2,004
- Stats at Pro Football Reference

John Matthew Stover (born January 27, 1968) is an American former professional football player who was a placekicker for 20 seasons in the National Football League (NFL), primarily with the Baltimore Ravens. After five seasons for the Cleveland Browns, he was among the Browns players transferred to the newly created Ravens franchise in 1996, with whom he played 13 seasons. Additionally, Stover was a member of the New York Giants during his first season and Indianapolis Colts during his last. His most successful season was in 2000 when he earned Pro Bowl and first-team All-Pro honors en route to the Ravens winning their first Super Bowl title in Super Bowl XXXV. He was also part of the Giants team that won Super Bowl XXV. For his accomplishments with the Ravens, Stover was named to the Baltimore Ravens Ring of Honor in 2011.

== Early life ==
Stover attended Lake Highlands High School in Dallas, Texas, the alma mater of fellow NFL placekicker Phil Dawson. Stover won All-District honors as both a wide receiver and kicker. During the 1985–86 season, he successfully kicked a 53-yard field goal. He graduated from high school in 1986.

== College career ==
Prior to his NFL career, Stover attended Louisiana Tech University, where he was an active member of the Alpha Omega chapter of Delta Kappa Epsilon acting as vice president. He graduated from Louisiana Tech with a degree in marketing. During his college career, Stover successfully converted on 64-of-88 field goal attempts. As a sophomore, facing Texas A&M, he kicked a 57-yard field goal, then a school record. He also punted as a senior, punting 36 times for 1,277 yards (34.1 yards per punt avg). He left Louisiana Tech with 262 career total points and seven field goals of 50 yards or more. While at Louisiana Tech, Stover would usually kick the ball through the goal posts on the first kickoff of the game.

- 1989 First Team All-South Independent

== Professional career ==
=== New York Giants ===
Stover was drafted by the New York Giants with the 329th selection (12th round) in the 1990 NFL draft. He was on the injured reserve list the entire season as the Giants won Super Bowl XXV over the Buffalo Bills.

=== Cleveland Browns ===
Stover signed with the Cleveland Browns in 1991. He spent five seasons as a Brown from 1991 to 1995.

Stover made his NFL debut in Week 1 of the 1991 season against the Dallas Cowboys, converting two extra points and missing one field goal on the day. In the 1994 season, Stover led the league in field goal percentage. In Week 9 of the 1995 season, Stover connected on all five field goal attempts, including the overtime game-winner, against the Cincinnati Bengals. For his game against the Bengals, he won AFC Special Teams Player of the Week.

=== Baltimore Ravens ===
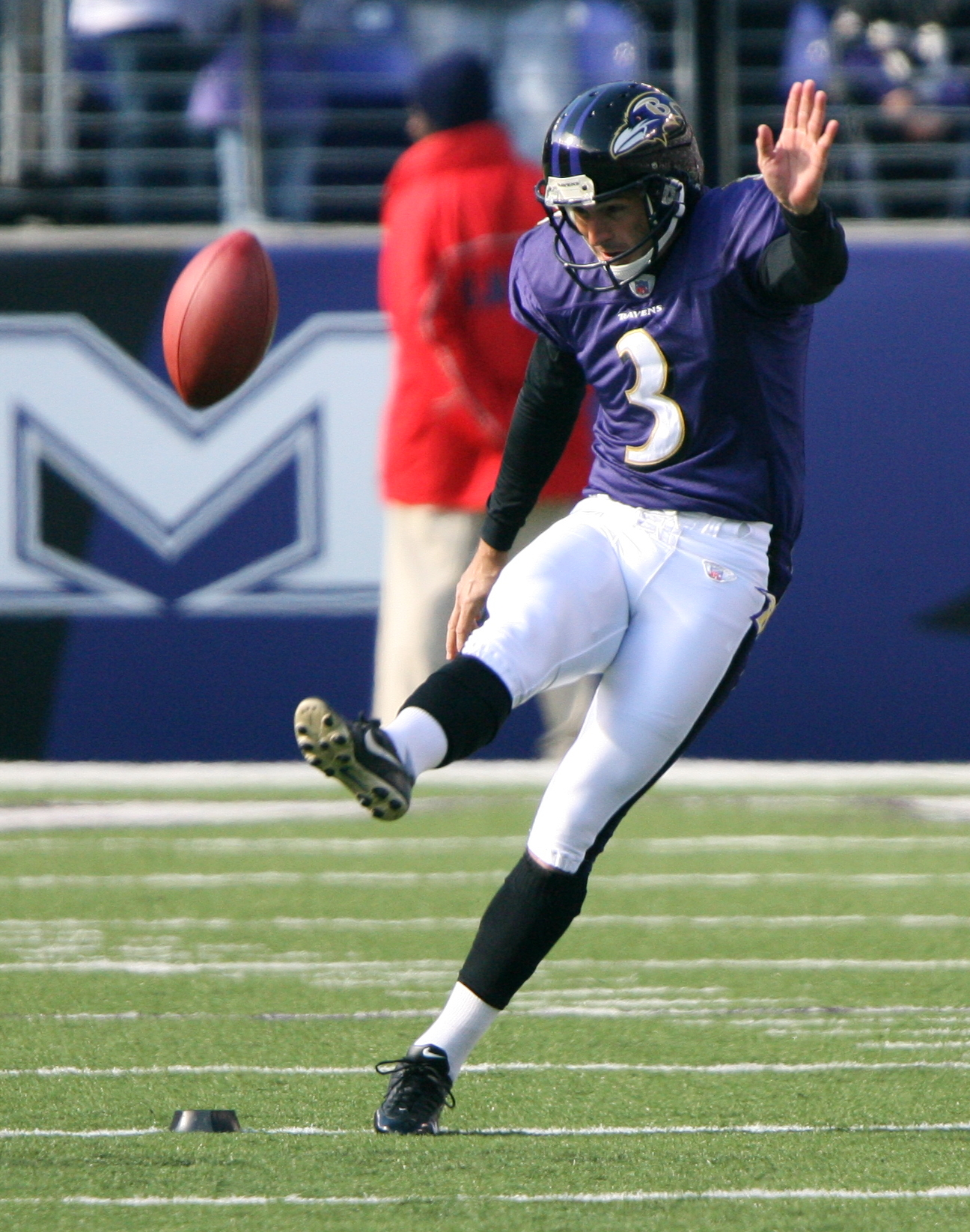
Stover with the Ravens in 2006

In 1996, the Browns moved to Baltimore to become the Baltimore Ravens. Stover spent the majority of his career as a Raven. In Week 4 of the 1997 season, Stover converted five field goals and three extra points for a career-high 18 points scored in a 36–10 victory over the Tennessee Titans. For the month of September in the 1997 season, Stover won Special Teams Player of the Month. In the 2000 season, the Ravens failed to score an offensive touchdown in five straight games, in which Stover, who was selected as a Pro Bowler and first team All-Pro, scored all the team's points. Stover won AFC Special Teams Player of the Month for November 2000. In the 2000 season, Stover led the league in field goal attempts and makes. Stover received a Super Bowl ring that year when the Ravens defeated his former team, the New York Giants in Super Bowl XXXV. In the 2006 season, Stover won AFC Special Teams Player of the Month for September. For the second time in his career, Stover led the league in field goal percentage.

Stover remained kicking with the Ravens, setting several records and kicking 18 game-winning field goals. In January 2009, Stover converted a 43-yard field goal to win against the Tennessee Titans in the AFC Divisional Round 13–10. That was Stover's last field goal as a member of the Ravens. The Ravens decided not to re-sign Stover following the 2008 season.

On November 20, 2011, Stover was inducted into the Ravens Ring of Honor, during a halftime ceremony at M&T Bank Stadium against the Cincinnati Bengals.

=== Indianapolis Colts ===
As a free agent following 2008, Stover signed with the Indianapolis Colts in the middle of the 2009 NFL season to replace the injured Adam Vinatieri, who was placed on injured reserve. In Indianapolis, Stover played in two wins against the Ravens, and helped the Colts to an appearance in Super Bowl XLIV, at age 42, which made Stover the oldest player in Super Bowl history up to that point (since surpassed by Tom Brady, who was 43 years old when he participated in Super Bowl LV). Stover converted a 38-yard field goal and two extra points in the loss to the New Orleans Saints, while also missing a 51-yard field goal in the fourth quarter. He was not re-signed by the team.

=== Retirement ===
Stover announced his retirement from professional football on May 25, 2011, with the Baltimore Ravens. At the time of his retirement, he was the last remaining member of the original Cleveland Browns still active in the NFL, and was also the last Ravens player to have played for the franchise before the team moved from Cleveland. At the time, he retired as the NFL's fourth all-time leading scorer.

== Career regular season statistics ==
Career high/best bolded

Regular season statistics
Season	Team (record)	G	FGM	FGA	%	<20	20-29	30-39	40-49	50+	LNG	BLK	XPM	XPA	%	PTS
1990	NYG (13–3)	Did not play due to injury														
1991	CLE (6–10)	**16**	16	22	72.7	1–2	2–3	8–9	3–6	**2–2**	**55**	1	33	34	97.1	81
1992	CLE (7–9)	**16**	21	29	72.4	1–1	11–11	6–8	2–6	1–3	51	0	29	30	96.7	92
1993	CLE (7–9)	**16**	16	22	72.7	0–0	4–4	5–6	6–8	1–4	53	0	36	36	**100.0**	84
1994	CLE (11–5)	**16**	26	28	92.9	1–1	7–7	10–11	8–8	0–1	45	0	32	32	**100.0**	110
1995	CLE (5–11)	**16**	29	33	87.9	1–1	12–12	9–10	7–9	0–1	47	0	26	26	**100.0**	113
1996	BAL (4–12)	**16**	19	25	76.0	0–0	8–8	5–6	5–10	1–1	50	0	34	35	97.1	91
1997	BAL (6–9–1)	**16**	26	34	76.5	0–0	8–9	**12–12**	6–11	0–2	49	**2**	32	32	**100.0**	110
1998	BAL (6–10)	**16**	21	28	75.0	0–0	6–6	5–5	10–17	0–0	48	1	24	24	**100.0**	87
1999	BAL (8–8)	**16**	28	33	84.8	**4–4**	9–9	6–8	7–7	2–5	50	1	32	32	**100.0**	116
2000	BAL (12–4)	**16**	**35**	**39**	89.7	2–2	9–9	12–13	10–12	2–3	51	1	30	30	**100.0**	**135**
2001	BAL (10–6)	**16**	30	35	85.7	0–0	**16–16**	9–10	5–9	0–0	49	0	25	25	**100.0**	115
2002	BAL (7–9)	15	21	25	84.0	0–0	9–9	4–5	7–10	1–1	51	0	33	33	**100.0**	96
2003	BAL (10–6)	**16**	33	38	86.8	0–0	**16–16**	6–6	**11–14**	0–2	49	0	35	35	**100.0**	134
2004	BAL (9–7)	**16**	29	32	90.6	2–2	9–9	7–8	9–10	2–3	50	1	30	30	**100.0**	117
2005	BAL (6–10)	**16**	30	34	88.2	1–1	8–8	10–11	**11–14**	0–0	49	0	23	23	**100.0**	113
2006	BAL (13–3)	**16**	28	30	**93.3**	0–0	12–13	9–9	6–7	1–1	52	0	37	37	**100.0**	121
2007	BAL (5–11)	**16**	27	32	84.4	1–1	11–11	7–7	8–12	0–1	49	1	26	26	**100.0**	107
2008	BAL (11–5)	**16**	27	33	81.8	0–0	11–11	11–12	5–9	0–1	47	1	**41**	**41**	**100.0**	122
2009	IND (14–2)	10	9	11	81.8	0–0	2–2	5–6	2–2	0–1	43	0	33	33	**100.0**	60
Career (20 seasons)		297	471	563	83.7	14–15	170–173	146–162	128–181	13–32	55	9	591	594	99.5	2004

=== NFL records ===
- NFL's sixth all-time leading scorer: 2,004 points
- Most consecutive games with a field goal: 38
- Most points scored by a player in his 30s: 1,113
- Oldest player to score in a Super Bowl: 42 years, 11 days old

== Personal life ==
Stover has a son, Jacob, who attended Loyola University and plays lacrosse. His daughter, Jenna, played lacrosse at Messiah College. Stover has an older brother and an older sister.
