= Sammy Walker (American football) =

American football player and coach (born 1969)

No. 23
- Position: Cornerback

Personal information
- Born: January 20, 1969 (age 57); McKinney, Texas, U.S.
- Listed height: 5 ft 11 in (1.80 m)
- Listed weight: 203 lb (92 kg)

Career information
- High school: McKinney
- College: Texas Tech
- NFL draft: 1991: 4th round, 88th overall pick

Career history
- Pittsburgh Steelers (1991–1992); Kansas City Chiefs (1993); Green Bay Packers (1993–1994); Texas Terror (1996)

Awards and highlights
- 2x Second Team All-SWC (1989), (1990)

Career NFL statistics
- Fumble recoveries: 1
- Stats at Pro Football Reference

Sammy William Walker (born January 20, 1969) is an American former professional football player who was a cornerback in the National Football League (NFL).

== Biography ==
Walker is one of 15 siblings. He was blinded in ninth grade, while helping his grandmother do some construction, and had laser surgery in 1992.

He played three seasons for the Pittsburgh Steelers (1991–1992) and Green Bay Packers (1993–1994). He was selected by the Steelers in the fourth round of the 1991 NFL draft. He played college football for the Texas Tech Red Raiders.

Walker was also an All-American sprinter for the Texas Tech Red Raiders track and field team, finishing 9th in the 100 m at the NCAA Division I Men's Outdoor Track and Field Championships.

In 2011, Walker was a defensive coordinator with the indoor football team, Amarillo Venom.
