= Ariel Solomon =

American football player (born 1968)

No. 69
- Positions: Guard, tackle

Personal information
- Born: July 16, 1968 (age 58); Brooklyn, New York, U.S.
- Listed height: 6 ft 5 in (1.96 m)
- Listed weight: 290 lb (132 kg)

Career information
- High school: Boulder (Boulder, Colorado)
- College: Colorado
- NFL draft: 1991: 10th round, 269th overall pick

Career history
- Pittsburgh Steelers (1991–1995); Minnesota Vikings (1996); Detroit Lions (1997)*
- * Offseason or practice squad member only

Awards and highlights
- National champion (1990)

Career NFL statistics
- Games played: 61
- Games started: 2
- Stats at Pro Football Reference

Ariel Mace Solomon (born July 16, 1968) is an American former professional football player who was an offensive lineman in the National Football League (NFL). He played 61 games over six seasons for the Pittsburgh Steelers and Minnesota Vikings. He played college football for the Colorado Buffaloes and was selected by the Steelers in the tenth round of the 1991 NFL draft.

Solomon is Jewish.
