= List of NFL career scoring leaders =

The top 27 scorers in National Football League history are all placekickers. Statistics include regular season scoring only and are based on 1,500 career points.

== List ==
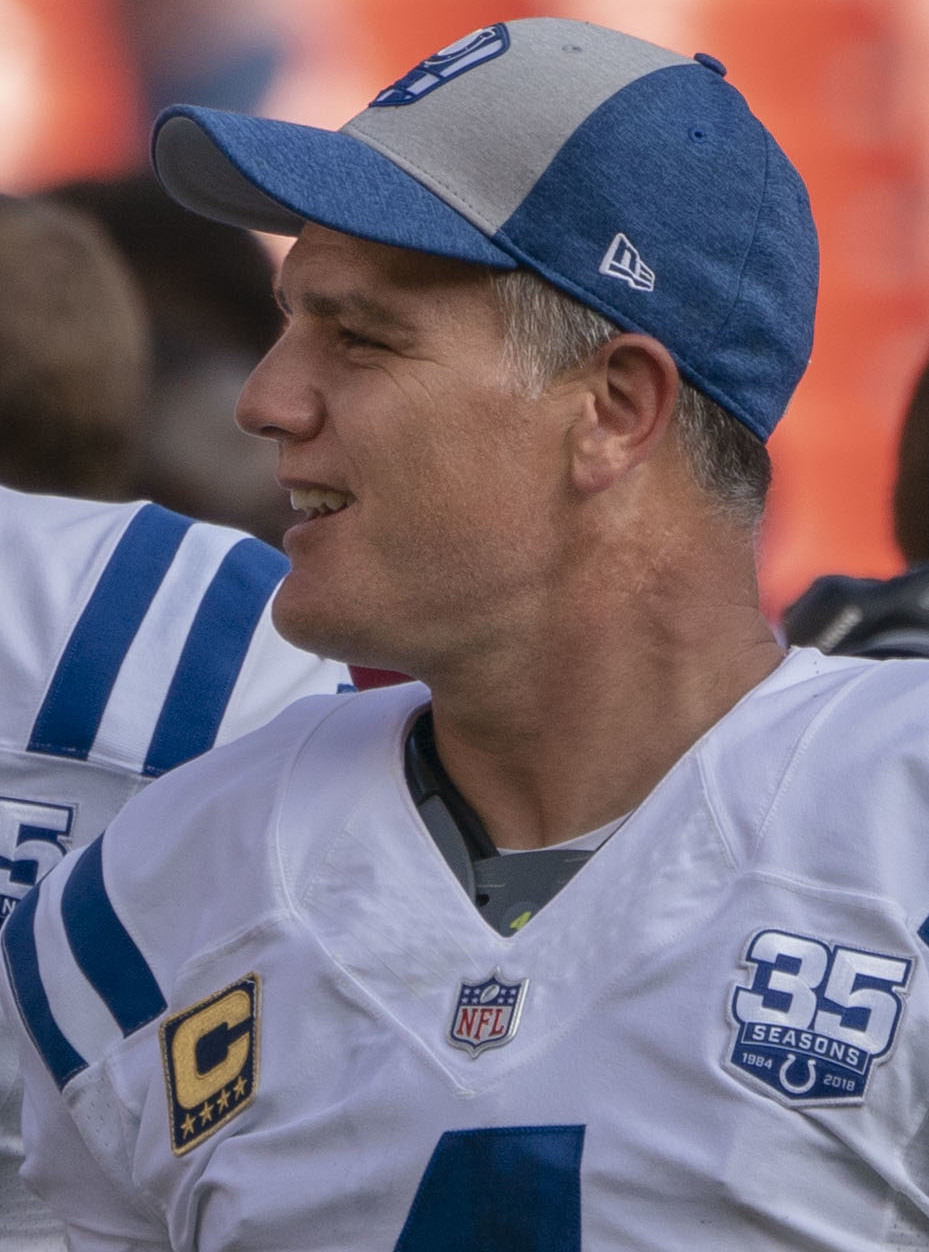
Adam Vinatieri has scored the most points in NFL history.

=== Key ===
**Rank**	Rank amongst leaders in scoring. A blank field indicates a tie
**Player**	Player name
**Pos.**	Player's position(s)
**Points**	Points scored
*	denotes elected to Pro Football Hall of Fame
**Bold**	denotes active player

Updated through Week 9 of 2026 season

Rank	Player	Pos.	Points
1	Adam Vinatieri *	K	2,673
2	Morten Andersen *	K	2,544
3	Gary Anderson	K	2,434
4	Jason Hanson	K	2,150
5	John Carney	K	2,062
6	Matt Stover	K	2,004
7	George Blanda *	K, QB	2,002
8	Jason Elam	K	1,983
9	John Kasay	K	1,970
10	Robbie Gould	K	1,961
11	Mason Crosby	K	1,939
12	Sebastian Janikowski	K	1,913
13	Matt Prater	K	1,908
14	Nick Folk	K	1,882
15	Stephen Gostkowski	K	1,875
16	Phil Dawson	K	1,847
17	Matt Bryant	K	1,758
18	Justin Tucker	K	1,775
19	Norm Johnson	K	1,736
20	David Akers	K	1,721
21	Nick Lowery	K	1,711
22	Jan Stenerud *	K	1,699
23	Ryan Longwell	K	1,687
24	Lou Groza *	K, OT	1,608
25	Eddie Murray	K	1,594
26	Al Del Greco	K	1,584
27	Olindo Mare	K	1,555

== Non-kickers ==
The top five scoring non-kickers in NFL history are listed here with their overall scoring rank. Only one non-kicker, Jerry Rice, is in the top 50 scorers of all time.

Rank	Player	Position	Career	Points
43	Jerry Rice	Wide receiver	1985–2004	1,256
62	Emmitt Smith	Running back	1990–2004	1,052
74	LaDainian Tomlinson	Running back	2001–2011	972
79	Randy Moss	Wide receiver	1998–2012	950
82	Terrell Owens	Wide receiver	1996–2010	942

== Historical career scoring leaders ==
NFL historical career scoring leaders
No.	Reign	Player	Team(s) while leader	Pts	Season(s)	Refs
1	1920	Lenny Sachs	Chicago Cardinals	12	1920	
2	1921	Elmer Oliphant	Buffalo All-Americans	47	1921	
3	1922	Dutch Sternaman	Chicago Bears	77	1922	
4	1923–1941	Paddy Driscoll	Chicago Cardinals (1923–1925); Chicago Bears (1926–1929)	143	1923	
4	1923–1941	Paddy Driscoll	Chicago Cardinals (1923–1925); Chicago Bears (1926–1929)	177	1924	
4	1923–1941	Paddy Driscoll	Chicago Cardinals (1923–1925); Chicago Bears (1926–1929)	244	1925	
4	1923–1941	Paddy Driscoll	Chicago Cardinals (1923–1925); Chicago Bears (1926–1929)	330	1926	
4	1923–1941	Paddy Driscoll	Chicago Cardinals (1923–1925); Chicago Bears (1926–1929)	373	1927	
4	1923–1941	Paddy Driscoll	Chicago Cardinals (1923–1925); Chicago Bears (1926–1929)	393	1928	
4	1923–1941	Paddy Driscoll	Chicago Cardinals (1923–1925); Chicago Bears (1926–1929)	402	1929–1941	
5	1942–1956	Don Hutson	Green Bay Packers	526	1942	
5	1942–1956	Don Hutson	Green Bay Packers	643	1943	
5	1942–1956	Don Hutson	Green Bay Packers	728	1944	
5	1942–1956	Don Hutson	Green Bay Packers	825	1945–1956	
6	1957–1970	Lou Groza	Cleveland Browns	893	1957	
6	1957–1970	Lou Groza	Cleveland Browns	953	1958	
6	1957–1970	Lou Groza	Cleveland Browns	1,001	1959	
6	1957–1970	Lou Groza	Cleveland Browns	1,086	1961	
6	1957–1970	Lou Groza	Cleveland Browns	1,161	1962	
6	1957–1970	Lou Groza	Cleveland Browns	1,246	1963	
6	1957–1970	Lou Groza	Cleveland Browns	1,361	1964	
6	1957–1970	Lou Groza	Cleveland Browns	1,454	1965	
6	1957–1970	Lou Groza	Cleveland Browns	1,532	1966	
6	1957–1970	Lou Groza	Cleveland Browns	1,608	1967–1970	
7	1971–1999	George Blanda	Oakland Raiders	1.647	1971	
7	1971–1999	George Blanda	Oakland Raiders	1,742	1972	
7	1971–1999	George Blanda	Oakland Raiders	1,842	1973	
7	1971–1999	George Blanda	Oakland Raiders	1,919	1974	
7	1971–1999	George Blanda	Oakland Raiders	2,002	1975–1999	
8	2000–2005	Gary Anderson	Minnesota Vikings (2000–2002); Tennessee Titans (2003–2003)	2,059	2000	
8	2000–2005	Gary Anderson	Minnesota Vikings (2000–2002); Tennessee Titans (2003–2003)	2,133	2001	
8	2000–2005	Gary Anderson	Minnesota Vikings (2000–2002); Tennessee Titans (2003–2003)	2,223	2002	
8	2000–2005	Gary Anderson	Minnesota Vikings (2000–2002); Tennessee Titans (2003–2003)	2,346	2003	
8	2000–2005	Gary Anderson	Minnesota Vikings (2000–2002); Tennessee Titans (2003–2003)	2,434	2004–2005	
9	2006–2017	Morten Andersen	Atlanta Falcons	2,445	2006	
9	2006–2017	Morten Andersen	Atlanta Falcons	2,544	2007–2017	
10	2018–present	Adam Vinatieri	Indianapolis Colts	2,600	2018	
10	2018–present	Adam Vinatieri	Indianapolis Colts	2,673	2019–present	

== See also ==
- List of NFL annual scoring leaders
- List of NFL individual records
