= Gary Jones (American football) =

American football player (born 1967)

No. 25
- Position: Safety

Personal information
- Born: November 30, 1967 (age 58); San Augustine, Texas, U.S.
- Listed height: 6 ft 1 in (1.85 m)
- Listed weight: 210 lb (95 kg)

Career information
- High school: John Tyler (Tyler, Texas)
- College: Texas A&M
- NFL draft: 1990: 9th round, 239th overall pick

Career history
- Pittsburgh Steelers (1990–1994); New York Jets (1995–1996)

Career NFL statistics
- Tackles: 206
- Interceptions: 6
- Fumble recoveries: 3
- Stats at Pro Football Reference

Gary DeWayne Jones (born November 30, 1967) is an American former professional football player who played safety for six seasons for the Pittsburgh Steelers from 1990 to 1994 and the New York Jets from 1995 to 1996. He was selected by the Steelers in the ninth round of the 1990 NFL draft with the 239th overall pick.
