= Joel Meyers =

American sportscaster

Joel Meyers is an American sportscaster who is the play-by-play announcer of the New Orleans Pelicans of the National Basketball Association (NBA). He also is the lead host of "Above the Rim", which airs weekdays from 10 am to 1 pm ET on SiriusXM NBA Radio. He is also the preseason play-by-play announcer for the New Orleans Saints.

== Career ==
Meyers's professional resumé includes NFL telecasts on NBC, UCLA Bruins radio play-by-play broadcasts from 1985 to 1989, Los Angeles Dodgers telecasts from 1990 to 1991, Busch Stadium II Public Address announcer for the home games of the 1982 World Series, California Angels telecasts from 1987 to 1989, St. Louis Cardinals radio broadcasts in 2002, Los Angeles/Oakland Raiders radio broadcasts from 1993 to 1996, San Antonio Spurs telecasts, various assignments for ESPN and FSN, and even the Los Angeles Lazers of the Major Indoor Soccer League. Meyers called the 2007 FIBA Americas gold and bronze medal games with Steve "Snapper" Jones. From 2012 to 2013 he called preseason games for the Houston Texans with Spencer Tillman. He also called games for the Los Angeles Clippers.

Meyers currently calls Big 12 Conference college football games for FSN and NBA games for ESPN Radio. He previously worked National Football League games for Westwood One (usually teamed with Bob Trumpy), but left that network after the 2006 season. He currently works for Gulf Coast Sports & Entertainment Network as the play-by-play announcer for the New Orleans Pelicans (formerly New Orleans Hornets). Meyers also called the 2014 preseason lineup on local Cox Sports Television for the New Orleans Saints.

Meyers called 1st Round games for the 2014 NBA Playoffs on TNT partnered with Chris Webber. He also called 1st Round games for TNT and NBATV during the 2020 NBA Playoffs. He worked with Greg Anthony for the 1st-round games in the 2020 NBA Playoffs. Meyers also worked 1st-round games for the 2021 NBA Playoffs for NBATV and TNT.

=== Los Angeles Lakers ===
Meyers most notably started work for the Los Angeles Lakers of the National Basketball Association in 2003 as their radio voice, the year after Chick Hearn died. Two years later, he was moved from radio to television where he was paired with Stu Lantz. Meyers replaced Paul Sunderland, who had succeeded Chick Hearn. Meyers left the Lakers at the end of the 2010–2011 season when the team did not renew his contract. He was supposed to be replaced by Spero Dedes, but Dedes ended up choosing a contract with the New York Knicks instead. Eventually, Meyers would be replaced by Bill Macdonald.

=== Key and Peele skits ===
Meyers portrayed the play-by-play announcer Dave Stassen in two Key & Peele football skits, beginning in Season 2, airing in 2012.

== Accolades ==
In 2010, he was inducted into the Southern California Jewish Sports Hall of Fame.

== Personal life ==
A St. Louis native, Meyers graduated from Ladue Horton Watkins High School in 1972. He attended the University of Missouri and served as the public address announcer at Busch Stadium II for the St. Louis Cardinals from 1980 until 1982 with the Cardinals winning the World Series in his final season.
