= Kenny Davidson (American football) =

American football player (born 1967)

No. 64, 90, 96
- Position: Defensive end

Personal information
- Born: August 17, 1967 (age 59); Shreveport, Louisiana, U.S.
- Listed height: 6 ft 5 in (1.96 m)
- Listed weight: 272 lb (123 kg)

Career information
- High school: Shreveport (LA) Huntington
- College: LSU
- NFL draft: 1990: 2nd round, 43rd overall pick

Career history
- Pittsburgh Steelers (1990–1993); Houston Oilers (1994–1995); Kansas City Chiefs (1996)*; Cincinnati Bengals (1996)
- * Offseason or practice squad member only

Career NFL statistics
- Tackles: 219
- Sacks: 16
- Interceptions: 2
- Stats at Pro Football Reference

Kenneth Darnell Davidson (born August 17, 1967) is an American former professional football player who was a defensive end in the National Football League (NFL) for the Pittsburgh Steelers (1990–1993), the Houston Oilers (1994–1995), and the Cincinnati Bengals (1996). He attended Louisiana State University, where he played college football for the LSU Tigers team. He was selected by the Steelers in the second round of the 1990 NFL draft.
