= Richard Shelton (American football) =

American football player (born 1966)

No. 45, 24, 42
- Position: Cornerback

Personal information
- Born: January 2, 1966 (age 60); Marietta, Georgia, U.S.
- Listed height: 5 ft 10 in (1.78 m)
- Listed weight: 180 lb (82 kg)

Career information
- High school: Marietta
- College: Liberty
- NFL draft: 1989: 11th round, 292nd overall pick

Career history
- Denver Broncos (1989); Seattle Seahawks (1989)*; Pittsburgh Steelers (1990); Montreal Machine (1991); Pittsburgh Steelers (1991–1993)
- * Offseason or practice squad member only

Career NFL statistics
- Interceptions: 3
- Fumble recoveries: 4
- Touchdowns: 1
- Stats at Pro Football Reference

Richard Eddie Shelton (born January 2, 1966) is an American former professional football player who was a cornerback in the National Football League (NFL). He played five seasons for the Denver Broncos and the Pittsburgh Steelers. He played college football for the Liberty Flames before being selected by the Broncos in the 11th round of the 1989 NFL draft with the 292nd overall pick. He is currently a scout for the Tennessee Titans.
