= John Jackson (offensive tackle) =

American football player (born 1965)

No. 65
- Position: Offensive tackle

Personal information
- Born: January 4, 1965 (age 61); Camp Kuwae, Okinawa, Japan
- Listed height: 6 ft 6 in (1.98 m)
- Listed weight: 297 lb (135 kg)

Career information
- High school: Woodward (Cincinnati, Ohio, U.S.)
- College: Eastern Kentucky
- NFL draft: 1988: 10th round, 252nd overall pick

Career history
- Pittsburgh Steelers (1988–1997); San Diego Chargers (1998–1999); Cincinnati Bengals (2000–2001)

Career NFL statistics
- Games played: 203
- Games started: 166
- Fumble recoveries: 5
- Stats at Pro Football Reference

John Jackson (born January 4, 1965) is an American former professional football player who was an offensive tackle in the National Football League (NFL). Best known for his time as a member of the Pittsburgh Steelers, Jackson played college football for the Eastern Kentucky Colonels and was selected in the tenth round of the 1988 NFL draft. While at EKU, Jackson was a three-year starter and a two-time All-OVC selection under head coach Roy Kidd. While he was at EKU, the Colonels won three OVC titles and he blocked for two of the top five career rushers in EKU history, Elroy Harris and James Crawford.

Jackson spent 14 seasons in the NFL with the Steelers (1988–1997), the San Diego Chargers (1998–1999), and the Cincinnati Bengals (2000–2001). He started in Super Bowl XXX for the Steelers when they went up against the Dallas Cowboys. John Jackson was inducted into the Kentucky Pro Football Hall of Fame in June 2009. Jackson was a dominating force at EKU and the talented offensive tackle had a good relationship with the school's program after he was drafted. While in the NFL, Jackson contributed to the EKU's athletic facilities and helped to improve the Moberly and Presnell Buildings on campus.

He was drafted into the NFL as a student. Shortly before being drafted, he met and married Joan Taylor of Cincinnati and the couple had two sons: Joshua (Josh) and Jordan. Josh, a former EKU student like his father, is a competitive long-drive golfer who ranks on the World Long Drive Tour. Jordan is a musical artist known as “Faedaway”. Joan, now Joan Sloan, and John divorced after 20 years of marriage.

Upon retirement from the league, Jackson said: "I'm done. You can stick a fork in me." Jackson had played in 203 games between the Steelers, Chargers and Bengals. "I'm not trying to come back, unless we go play golf somewhere. That's about the only thing I'll play."
