= Rick Strom (American football) =

American football player (born 1965)

No. 11
- Position: Quarterback

Personal information
- Born: March 11, 1965 (age 61); Pittsburgh, Pennsylvania, U.S.
- Listed height: 6 ft 2 in (1.88 m)
- Listed weight: 197 lb (89 kg)

Career information
- High school: Fox Chapel (PA)
- College: Georgia Tech
- NFL draft: 1988: undrafted

Career history
- Pittsburgh Steelers (1988–1993); Buffalo Bills (1994); Detroit Lions (1996)

Career NFL statistics
- Passing yards: 162
- TD–INT: 0-1
- Passer rating: 66.9
- Stats at Pro Football Reference

Rick Strom (born March 11, 1965) is an American former professional football player who was a quarterback in the National Football League (NFL). He played for the Pittsburgh Steelers, Buffalo Bills and Detroit Lions. He completed 14 out of 22 passes for 162 yards with no touchdowns, 1 interception and 5 sacks in his NFL career with a rate of 66.9, also in his NFL career, Strom had 8 rush attempts for 7 yards averaging about 0.9 yards a carry. He played college football for the Georgia Tech Yellow Jackets from 1983 to 1987, lettering in the 1983, '84, '86 and '87 seasons. He started 16 games at quarterback over the 1986–87 seasons, started 10 games in 1986, passing for 1,011 yards and five touchdowns and started the first six games of 1987 and completed 83 of 163 passes for 1,066 yards and six touchdowns before a season-ending thumb injury.

Strom began providing sideline reports for Georgia Tech football radio broadcasts in 2005. In 2008, he moved up to the booth as color commentator, paired with veteran Tech play-by-play announcer, Wes Durham.

== Early life ==
Strom graduated from Fox Chapel Area High School in Pittsburgh, Pennsylvania.

== Professional career ==
=== Pittsburgh Steelers ===
Strom Signed with the Pittsburgh Steelers on April 28, 1988.

=== Buffalo Bills ===
Strom signed with the Buffalo Bills to back up with Jim Kelly and Frank Reich.

== See also ==
- List of Georgia Tech Yellow Jackets starting quarterbacks
