= Dwight Stone (American football) =

American football player (born 1964)

No. 20, 80, 83
- Positions: Wide receiver, kick returner, running back

Personal information
- Born: January 28, 1964 (age 62); Florala, Alabama, U.S.
- Listed height: 6 ft 0 in (1.83 m)
- Listed weight: 191 lb (87 kg)

Career information
- High school: Florala
- College: Middle Tennessee State
- NFL draft: 1987: undrafted

Career history
- Pittsburgh Steelers (1987–1994); Carolina Panthers (1995–1998); New York Jets (1999–2000)

Career NFL statistics
- Receptions: 154
- Receiving yards: 2,478
- Rushing yards: 596
- Rushing average: 5.8
- Total touchdowns: 15
- Stats at Pro Football Reference

Dwight Stone (born January 28, 1964) is an American former professional football player who was a running back, wide receiver, and kick returner in the National Football League (NFL), playing 14 years for the Pittsburgh Steelers, Carolina Panthers, and New York Jets. Stone originally signed with Pittsburgh as an undrafted free agent in 1987 and was the only undrafted free agent to make the opening day roster. He was an outstanding special teams gunner and kick returner for eight years with the Steelers. He was timed at sub 4.20 in the 40-yard dash and did 28 reps on the bench press (225 lbs.). Former Steelers coach Chuck Noll said that Stone had “Beep Beep” speed and was "the fastest player I've ever coached over 40 yards." Stone was selected to the All-Undrafted Steelers Team in May 2021. He played college football at both Middle Tennessee State University and Marion Military Institute as a running back and averaged 7 yards per rush and scored over 40 touchdowns in his college career. He played high school football at Florala High School. In 1999, Stone was selected as the winner of the New York Jets' Marty Lyons Award for Community Service, given to the player who best gives from the heart through charity and community involvement

After retiring from the NFL, Stone became a police officer for the Charlotte Mecklenburg Police Department in Charlotte, North Carolina, where he served as a school resource office, patrol officer, and field force officer for 15 years. In 2007–08, Officer Stone was named the Right Moves for Youth Volunteer of the Year. He retired from the CMPD in 2015.
