= 1991 NFL season =

American football season

Regular season
- Duration: September 1 – December 23, 1991

Playoffs
- Start date: December 28, 1991
- AFC Champions: Buffalo Bills
- NFC Champions: Washington Redskins

Super Bowl XXVI
- Date: January 26, 1992
- Site: Metrodome, Minneapolis, Minnesota
- Champions: Washington Redskins

Pro Bowl
- Date: February 2, 1992
- Site: Aloha Stadium

AFC teams: West, Central, East
NFC teams: West, Central, East

The 1991 NFL season was the 72nd regular season of the National Football League (NFL). It was the final season for coach Chuck Noll. The season ended with Super Bowl XXVI when the Washington Redskins defeated the Buffalo Bills, 37–24, at the Metrodome in Minnesota. This was the second of four consecutive Super Bowl losses for Buffalo.

== Player movement ==
=== Transactions ===
- March 26, 1991: Ronnie Lott signs with the Los Angeles Raiders as a Plan B Free Agent.
- April 2, 1991: Roger Craig signs with the Los Angeles Raiders as a Plan B Free Agent.
- August 27: The Green Bay Packers sign punter Rick Tuten, who appeared in Super Bowl XXV with the Buffalo Bills.
- September 19: The Phoenix Cardinals sign quarterback Stan Gelbaugh, who led the London Monarchs to the World Bowl '91.
- September 19: The Philadelphia Eagles sign Wide Receiver Roy Green.
- September 21: The Pittsburgh Steelers sign quarterback Rick Strom.
- September 21: The San Diego Chargers sign Wide Receiver Yancey Thigpen.
- September 26 : The San Francisco 49ers sign Defensive End Jim Burt.

=== Trades ===
- July 22: The Atlanta Falcons traded Defensive Tackle Tony Casillas to the Dallas Cowboys.
- August 14: The Los Angeles Raiders traded Vencie Glenn to the New Orleans Saints
- August 19: The New Orleans Saints traded Robert Massey to the Phoenix Cardinals
- August 21: The New Orleans Saints traded wide receiver Brett Perriman to the Detroit Lions
- August 27: The Green Bay Packers traded kicker Brad Daluiso to the Atlanta Falcons
- August 27: The Los Angeles Raiders traded quarterback Steve Beuerlein to the Dallas Cowboys
- August 28: The Chargers traded quarterback Billy Joe Tolliver to the Atlanta Falcons
- September 11: The Seattle Seahawks traded kicker Norm Johnson to the Atlanta Falcons.

=== Retirements ===
- Four-time Super Bowl champion Mike Webster announced his retirement on March 11, 1991, after a 17-year career with a total of 245 games played at center.

=== Draft ===
The 1991 NFL draft was held from April 21 to 22, 1991, at New York City's Marriott Marquis. With the first pick, the Dallas Cowboys selected defensive tackle Russell Maryland from the University of Miami.

== Officiating changes ==
Art McNally resigned as the league's Director of Officiating during the offseason. He had held the position since 1968. Longtime NFL referee Jerry Seeman, who worked the previous season's Super Bowl XXV, was named as McNally's replacement.

Jim Tunney retired after 31 years as an NFL official. He remains the only referee to have worked consecutive Super Bowls (XI, and XII).

Gene Barth died on October 11, 1991. For the remainder of the 1991 season, NFL officials wore a black armband on their left sleeve with the white number 14 to honor him.

Bernie Kukar, Larry Nemmers (the side judge for Super Bowl XXV), and Stan Kemp were promoted to referee to replace Barth, Seeman, and Tunney.

== Major rule changes ==
Source: Total Football: The Official Encyclopedia of the National Football League (ISBN 0-06-270174-6). pp 1583–1592.

- The definition of a drop kick, field goal, and punt is modified: all three can only be attempted from behind the line of scrimmage.
- If a foul by a player causes an injury to an opponent, a team time out will not be charged to the penalized team anytime during the game instead of only during the last two minutes of a half/overtime.
- The game clock will not start until the next snap following any change of possession, even if the player went out of bounds.
- Officials will immediately blow the play dead when a defensive player is offsides before the snap and clearly rushes beyond the offensive line in such a way that he becomes an unabated threat to the quarterback.
- The "in the grasp" rule adopted in 1979 was modified to declare the play dead "as soon as the passer is clearly in the grasp and control of any tackler behind the line, and the passer’s safety is in jeopardy." This change was made due to the rise of more mobile quarterbacks such as Randall Cunningham.
- A touchback will be ruled when a player fumbles the ball in the field of play and it goes out of bounds in the opponent's end zone.
- A touchback, not a safety, will also be ruled when a player fumbles the ball in his own end zone and the opponent is the one that knocks the fumble out of bounds in the end zone.
- An offensive player cannot deliberately bat a backward pass forward.

== 1991 deaths ==
- Ollie Spencer
- Jimmy Strausbaugh
- Sid Youngelman

=== Members of the Pro Football Hall of Fame ===
- Paul Brown: Brown died on August 5, 1991, at home of complications from pneumonia. A longtime coach of the Cleveland Browns and co-founder of the Cincinnati Bengals in 1968, also serving as their first coach, Brown was inducted into the Pro Football Hall of Fame in 1967.
- Red Grange: Grange developed Parkinson's disease and died on January 28, 1991, in Lake Wales, Florida. Joining the Chicago Bears in 1925, Grange, a charter member of both the College and Pro Football Halls of Fame, also became the first person other than the game referee to toss the coin at a Super Bowl.

== Preseason ==
=== American Bowl ===
A series of National Football League pre-season exhibition games that were held at sites outside the United States, a total of three games were contested.

Date	Winning team	Score	Losing team	Score	Stadium	City
July 28, 1991	Buffalo Bills	17	Philadelphia Eagles	13	Wembley Stadium	(United Kingdom) London
August 3, 1991	San Francisco 49ers	21	Chicago Bears	7	Olympiastadion	(Germany) Berlin
August 4, 1991	Miami Dolphins	19	Los Angeles Raiders	17	Tokyo Dome	(Japan) Tokyo

== Regular season ==
=== Scheduling formula ===
Inter-conference
AFC East vs NFC Central
AFC Central vs NFC East
AFC West vs NFC West

Highlights of the 1991 season included:

- Thanksgiving: Two games were played on Thursday, November 28, featuring Chicago at Detroit and Pittsburgh at Dallas, with Detroit and Dallas winning.

=== Final standings ===
AFC East
	W	L	T	PCT	DIV	CONF	PF	PA	STK
^{(1)} Buffalo Bills	13	3	0	.813	7–1	10–2	458	318	L1
^{(6)} New York Jets	8	8	0	.500	4–4	6–6	314	293	W1
Miami Dolphins	8	8	0	.500	4–4	5–7	343	349	L2
New England Patriots	6	10	0	.375	4–4	5–9	211	305	L1
Indianapolis Colts	1	15	0	.063	1–7	1–11	143	381	L6

AFC Central
	W	L	T	PCT	DIV	CONF	PF	PA	STK
^{(3)} Houston Oilers	11	5	0	.688	5–1	10–2	386	251	L1
Pittsburgh Steelers	7	9	0	.438	4–2	7–5	292	344	W2
Cleveland Browns	6	10	0	.375	2–4	6–6	293	298	L3
Cincinnati Bengals	3	13	0	.188	1–5	2–10	263	435	W1

AFC West
	W	L	T	PCT	DIV	CONF	PF	PA	STK
^{(2)} Denver Broncos	12	4	0	.750	5–3	10–4	304	235	W4
^{(4)} Kansas City Chiefs	10	6	0	.625	6–2	8–4	322	252	W1
^{(5)} Los Angeles Raiders	9	7	0	.563	5–3	7–5	298	297	L3
Seattle Seahawks	7	9	0	.438	2–6	6–6	276	261	W1
San Diego Chargers	4	12	0	.250	2–6	3–9	274	342	L1

NFC East
	W	L	T	PCT	DIV	CONF	PF	PA	STK
^{(1)} Washington Redskins	14	2	0	.875	6–2	10–2	485	224	L1
^{(5)} Dallas Cowboys	11	5	0	.688	5–3	8–4	342	310	W5
Philadelphia Eagles	10	6	0	.625	5–3	6–6	285	244	W1
New York Giants	8	8	0	.500	3–5	5–7	281	297	W1
Phoenix Cardinals	4	12	0	.250	1–7	3–11	196	344	L8

NFC Central
	W	L	T	PCT	DIV	CONF	PF	PA	STK
^{(2)} Detroit Lions	12	4	0	.750	6–2	8–4	339	295	W6
^{(4)} Chicago Bears	11	5	0	.688	7–1	9–3	299	269	L1
Minnesota Vikings	8	8	0	.500	3–5	8–6	301	306	L1
Green Bay Packers	4	12	0	.250	3–5	3–9	273	313	W1
Tampa Bay Buccaneers	3	13	0	.188	1–7	2–10	199	365	W1

NFC West
	W	L	T	PCT	DIV	CONF	PF	PA	STK
^{(3)} New Orleans Saints	11	5	0	.688	4–2	8–4	341	211	W2
^{(6)} Atlanta Falcons	10	6	0	.625	5–1	7–5	361	338	L1
San Francisco 49ers	10	6	0	.625	3–3	7–5	393	239	W6
Los Angeles Rams	3	13	0	.188	0–6	2–10	234	390	L10

=== Tiebreakers ===
- N.Y. Jets finished ahead of Miami in the AFC East based on head-to-head sweep (2–0).
- Chicago was the first NFC Wild Card based on better conference record than Dallas (9–3 to Cowboys' 8–4).
- Atlanta finished ahead of San Francisco in the NFC West based on head-to-head sweep (2–0), and was the third NFC Wild Card ahead of Philadelphia based on better conference record (7–5 to Eagles' 6–6).

== Playoffs ==
Dec 29 – Soldier Field	Jan 5 – Pontiac Silverdome
5	Dallas	17
5	Dallas	6
4	Chicago	13	Jan 12 – RFK Stadium
2	Detroit	38
NFC
Dec 28 – Louisiana Superdome	2	Detroit	10
Jan 4 – RFK Stadium
1	Washington	41
6	Atlanta	27	NFC Championship
6	Atlanta	7
3	New Orleans	20	Jan 26 – Hubert H. Humphrey Metrodome
1	Washington	24
Wild-card round
Divisional round
Dec 29 – Astrodome	N1	Washington	37
Jan 4 – Mile High Stadium
A1	Buffalo	24
6	NY Jets	10	Super Bowl XXVI
3	Houston	24
3	Houston	17	Jan 12 – Rich Stadium
2	Denver	26
AFC
Dec 28 – Arrowhead Stadium	2	Denver	7
Jan 5 – Rich Stadium
1	Buffalo	10
5	LA Raiders	6	AFC Championship
4	Kansas City	14
4	Kansas City	10
1	Buffalo	37

== Records, milestones, and notable statistics ==
Week 8

- October 21: James Lofton became the oldest player to record 200 yards receiving as well as 200 yards from scrimmage in a game (35 years, 108 days), as the Buffalo Bills defeated the Cincinnati Bengals by a 35–16 final.

== Awards ==
Most Valuable Player	Thurman Thomas, running back, Buffalo
Coach of the Year	Wayne Fontes, Detroit
Offensive Player of the Year	Thurman Thomas, running back, Buffalo
Defensive Player of the Year	Pat Swilling, linebacker, New Orleans
Offensive Rookie of the Year	Leonard Russell, running back, New England
Defensive Rookie of the Year	Mike Croel, linebacker, Denver
NFL Comeback Player of the Year	Jim McMahon, quarterback, Philadelphia
NFL Man of the Year	Anthony Muñoz, offensive tackle, Cincinnati
Super Bowl Most Valuable Player	Mark Rypien, quarterback, Washington

== Coaching changes ==
=== Offseason ===
- Cleveland Browns: Bill Belichick was named the permanent replacement, after Bud Carson was fired after the first nine games of 1990, and Jim Shofner served as interim for the final seven games.
- New England Patriots: Dick MacPherson replaced the fired Rod Rust.
- New York Giants: Bill Parcells resigned following the team's Super Bowl XXV victory and was replaced by Ray Handley.
- Philadelphia Eagles: Rich Kotite was hired after the team opted to not renew Buddy Ryan's contract.
- Tampa Bay Buccaneers: Richard Williamson became the permanent head coach, after serving as interim for the final three games of 1990 following the firing of Ray Perkins.

=== In-season ===
- Indianapolis Colts: Ron Meyer was fired after five games, and Rick Venturi then served as interim for the final 11 games.

== Uniform changes ==
- The NFL shield was added to the yoke of the jerseys and the left thigh of the pants. The NFL shield was also added to the right breast of the officiating uniforms.
- The New England Patriots switched from white face masks to red.
- The Washington Redskins switched from big block numbers to skinnier font size numbers.
- The San Francisco 49ers removed the white stripes on its red socks, making them solid red.
  - Just before the start of training camp, owner Eddie DeBartolo unveiled a new helmet logo with "49ers" in a modern font, replacing the interlocking "SF" which had been on the team's helmets since 1962. After severe fan backlash, DeBartolo reversed course two days later.

== Television ==
This was the second year under the league's four-year broadcast contracts with ABC, CBS, NBC, TNT, and ESPN. ABC, CBS, and NBC continued to televise Monday Night Football, the NFC package, the AFC package, respectively. Sunday night games aired on TNT during the first half of the season, and ESPN during the second half of the season.
