= Pat Brady (gridiron football) =

American gridiron football player (1926–2009)

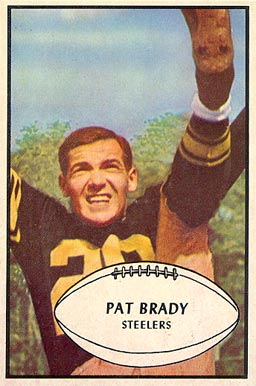
- Brady on a 1953 Bowman football card

No. 51, 28, 18
- Positions: Quarterback, punter

Personal information
- Born: September 7, 1926; Seattle, Washington, U.S.
- Died: July 14, 2009 (aged 82); Reno, Nevada, U.S.
- Listed height: 6 ft 1 in (1.85 m)
- Listed weight: 195 lb (88 kg)

Career information
- High school: O'Dea (Seattle)
- College: Nevada (1948–1950); Bradley (1951)
- NFL draft: 1952: 13th round, 155th overall pick

Career history
- Hamilton Tiger-Cats (1951); New York Giants (1952)*; Pittsburgh Steelers (1952–1954)
- * Offseason or practice squad member only

Awards and highlights
- Pittsburgh Steelers 50th Anniversary Team; NCAA record: Longest punt: 99-yard (1950)

Career NFL statistics
- Punts: 223
- Punting yards: 9,932
- Longest punt: 72
- Stats at Pro Football Reference

Patrick Thomas Brady (September 7, 1926 – July 14, 2009) was an American professional football player who was a quarterback and punter for the Pittsburgh Steelers of the National Football League (NFL). He played college football for the Nevada Wolf Pack.

== Early life ==
Brady attended the University of Nevada, Reno, from 1948 until 1951, first as a quarterback and then as a punter. On October 28, 1950, against Loyola Marymount, Brady had a punt of 99 yards, the longest possible under the rules, a record that cannot be broken and has never been tied. Brady completed his collegiate career at and graduated from Bradley University in 1951, after Nevada cancelled its 1951 season due to budget shortfalls.

== Career ==
After spending the 1951 season with the Hamilton Tiger-Cats in the eastern Canadian pro league, Brady played for the Steelers during the 1952, 1953, and 1954 seasons, leading the league in punting in 1953 and 1954 and averaging 44.5 yards for his three years. A torn Achilles tendon during the 1955 pre-season ended his career.

After football, Brady moved back to Reno and worked in the printing industry. In 1971, he was appointed the official State Printer by Governor Mike O'Callaghan. Brady was a part-owner of Reno's Bonanza Casino for many years, and was also on the Nevada Boxing Commission.

== Recognition ==
Brady was inducted into the Bradley Hall of Fame on February 23, 1955, and later the Nevada Hall of Fame in 1979. He was also named to the Steelers 50th Anniversary team in 1982.

== Death ==
Brady died on July 14, 2009, in Reno, Nevada, after a long battle with lymphoma.
