= Pittsburgh Steelers All-Time Team (50th Season) =

1982 list of Pittsburgh Steelers players

The Pittsburgh Steelers All-Time Team (50th Season) was named as a part of the franchise's 50th season celebration in 1982. The top 24 players in the club's history were selected: eleven on offense, eleven on defense, one punter and one placekicker.

The team was chosen on the basis of more than 100,000 fan ballots.

This team was supplanted in 2007 by the current All-Time team which was named as a part of the club's 75th season celebration. The updated team includes all the players from this 50th season team except, Gerry Mullins, Sam Davis, Mike Wagner, Roy Gerela and Pat Brady.

== Offense ==
Position	Jersey No.	Player	Years on Team	# of Pro Bowls	Hall of Fame	Honors	Ref.
Quarterback	12	Terry Bradshaw	1970–1983	3	Yes	1978 NFL MVP	
Running back	20	Rocky Bleier	1968, 1971–1980	-	No		
Running back	32^{[a]}	Franco Harris	1972–1983	9	Yes	1972 Off. Rookie of the Year	
Wide receiver	82	John Stallworth	1974–1987	4	Yes	1984 Comeback Player of the Year	
Wide receiver	88	Lynn Swann	1974–1982	4	Yes	Super Bowl X MVP	
Tight end	81	Elbie Nickel	1947–1957	3	No		
Center	52	Mike Webster	1974–1988	9	Yes	NFL All-Time team	
Guard	72	Gerry Mullins	1971–1979	-	No		
Guard	57	Sam Davis	1967–1979	-	No		
Tackle	79	Larry Brown	1971–1984	1	No		
Tackle	55	Jon Kolb	1969–1981	-	No		

== Defense ==
Position	Jersey No.	Player	Years on Team	# of Pro Bowls	Hall of Fame	Honors	Ref.
Defensive tackle	75^{[a]}	Joe Greene	1969–1981	10	Yes	NFL All-Time team	
Defensive tackle	70^{[a]}	Ernie Stautner	1950–1963	9	Yes	1950s All-Decade Team	
Defensive end	78	Dwight White	1971–1980	2	No		
Defensive end	68	L. C. Greenwood	1969–1981	2	No	1970s All-Decade Team	
Linebacker	59	Jack Ham	1971–1982	8	Yes	NFL All-Time team	
Linebacker	58	Jack Lambert	1974–1982	9	Yes	NFL All-Time team	
Linebacker	34	Andy Russell	1963–1976	7	No		
Cornerback	47	Mel Blount	1970–1983	5	Yes	NFL All-Time team	
Cornerback	80	Jack Butler	1951–1959	4	Yes	1950s All-Decade Team	
Safety	31	Donnie Shell	1974–1987	5	Yes	College Football Hall of Fame	
Safety	23	Mike Wagner	1971–1980	2	No		

== Specialists ==
Position	Jersey No.	Player	Years on Team	# of Pro Bowls	Hall of Fame	Honors	Ref.
Placekicker	10	Roy Gerela	1971–1978	2	No		
Punter	28, 18	Pat Brady	1952–1954	-	No		

== Notes ==
Names in bold indicates the player spent his entire playing career with the Steelers.
^{a} Number retired by team
^{b} Finalist in 2002
