= Jack Butler (American football) =

American football player (1927–2013)

No. 80
- Position: Cornerback

Personal information
- Born: November 12, 1927; Pittsburgh, Pennsylvania, U.S.
- Died: May 11, 2013 (aged 85); Pittsburgh, Pennsylvania, U.S.
- Listed height: 6 ft 1 in (1.85 m)
- Listed weight: 200 lb (91 kg)

Career information
- High school: Mount Carmel College Seminary (ON)
- College: St. Bonaventure (1949–1950)
- NFL draft: 1951: undrafted

Career history

Playing
- Pittsburgh Steelers (1951–1959)

Coaching
- Pittsburgh Steelers (1961–1963) Assistant coach

Awards and highlights
- 3× First-team All-Pro (1957-1959); Second-team All-Pro (1956); 4× Pro Bowl (1955–1958); NFL interceptions co-leader (1957); NFL 1950s All-Decade Team; Pittsburgh Steelers All-Time Team; Pittsburgh Steelers Legends team; Pittsburgh Steelers Hall of Honor

Career NFL statistics
- Interceptions: 52
- Interception yards: 827
- Touchdowns: 4
- Stats at Pro Football Reference
- Pro Football Hall of Fame

John Bradshaw Butler (November 12, 1927 – May 11, 2013) was an American professional football player who was a cornerback for the Pittsburgh Steelers of the National Football League (NFL). In 2012, he was elected into the Pro Football Hall of Fame.

== Professional career ==
Butler was an undrafted free agent whom the Pittsburgh Steelers brought onto their roster in 1951 based on a recommendation that Art Rooney Sr. received from his brother Silas Rooney, who was a priest serving as athletic director at St. Bonaventure University. Butler would become a defensive back and occasional wide receiver for the Steelers.

As a rookie, Butler intercepted five passes for 142 yards. In 1953, he had nine interceptions and returned two of them for touchdowns. Four interceptions came in a game against the Washington Redskins on December 13, 1953. One of the interceptions resulted in a 35-yard return for a touchdown to win the game for the Steelers 14–13. The following year Butler set a record with two interception returns for touchdowns. In 1957, he led the league in interceptions with a career-best 10.

Offensively, Butler scored a touchdown against the New York Giants. It was late in the game and Butler had caught the game-winning touchdown pass from Jim Finks.

In 1958, Butler added nine more interceptions to his growing list. During the 1959 season after garnering two interceptions, Butler was forced to retire due to a leg injury he received when tight end Pete Retzlaff of the Philadelphia Eagles rolled into Butler's knee.

Butler never made more than around $12,000 as a player with the Steelers. Following his playing career, Butler spent 46 years with the BLESTO Scouting Combine (44 as its director). During this time, his contributions to the NFL included scouting and evaluating over 75,000 college athletes and starting the Combine scouting process that is still in use today.

Butler was named to four straight Pro Bowls from 1955 to 1958. He had 52 interceptions during his career and 865 yards. At the time of his retirement in 1959, Jack tied for first with Safety Bobby Dillon in career interceptions, garnering 52 in his 9-year career.

In 2004, he was named to the Professional Football Researchers Association Hall of Very Good in the association's second HOVG class.

In October 2008, Butler was named as one of the 33 Greatest Pittsburgh Steelers of all time. The Steelers named players to this team as part of their 75th anniversary season celebration. He was named to the National Football League 1950s All-Decade Team. In the decade of the 1950s, Butler was tied for the 2nd most interceptions with Bobby Dillon.

He was named as a senior nominee for the Pro Football Hall of Fame for 2012 and was elected as a member on February 4, 2012.

=== Honors ===
- 1956- Associated Press: 2nd Team All-NFL; Newspaper Ent. Assoc.: 2nd Team All-NFL; Sporting News: 1st Team All-NFL.
- 1957- Associated Press: 1st Team All-NFL; Newspaper Ent. Assoc.: 1st Team All-NFL; Sporting News: 1st Team All-NFL; UPI: 1st Team All-NFL.
- 1958- Associated Press: 1st Team All-NFL; Newspaper Ent. Assoc.: 1st Team All-NFL; Sporting News: 1st Team All-NFL; New York Daily News: 1st Team All-NFL; UPI: 1st Team All-NFL.
- 1959- Associated Press: 1st Team All-NFL; New York Daily News: 1st Team All-NFL; Sporting News: 1st Team All-NFL; UPI: 1st Team All-NFL.
- 2012- Pro Football Hall of Fame

== Death ==
Butler died at UPMC Shadyside in Pittsburgh on May 11, 2013. He was admitted for a staph infection around his artificial knee, a problem that almost killed him in 1959 and recurred every five to seven years since.
