= Pittsburgh Steelers =

NFL team in Pittsburgh, Pennsylvania

- Current season
Logo	Wordmark
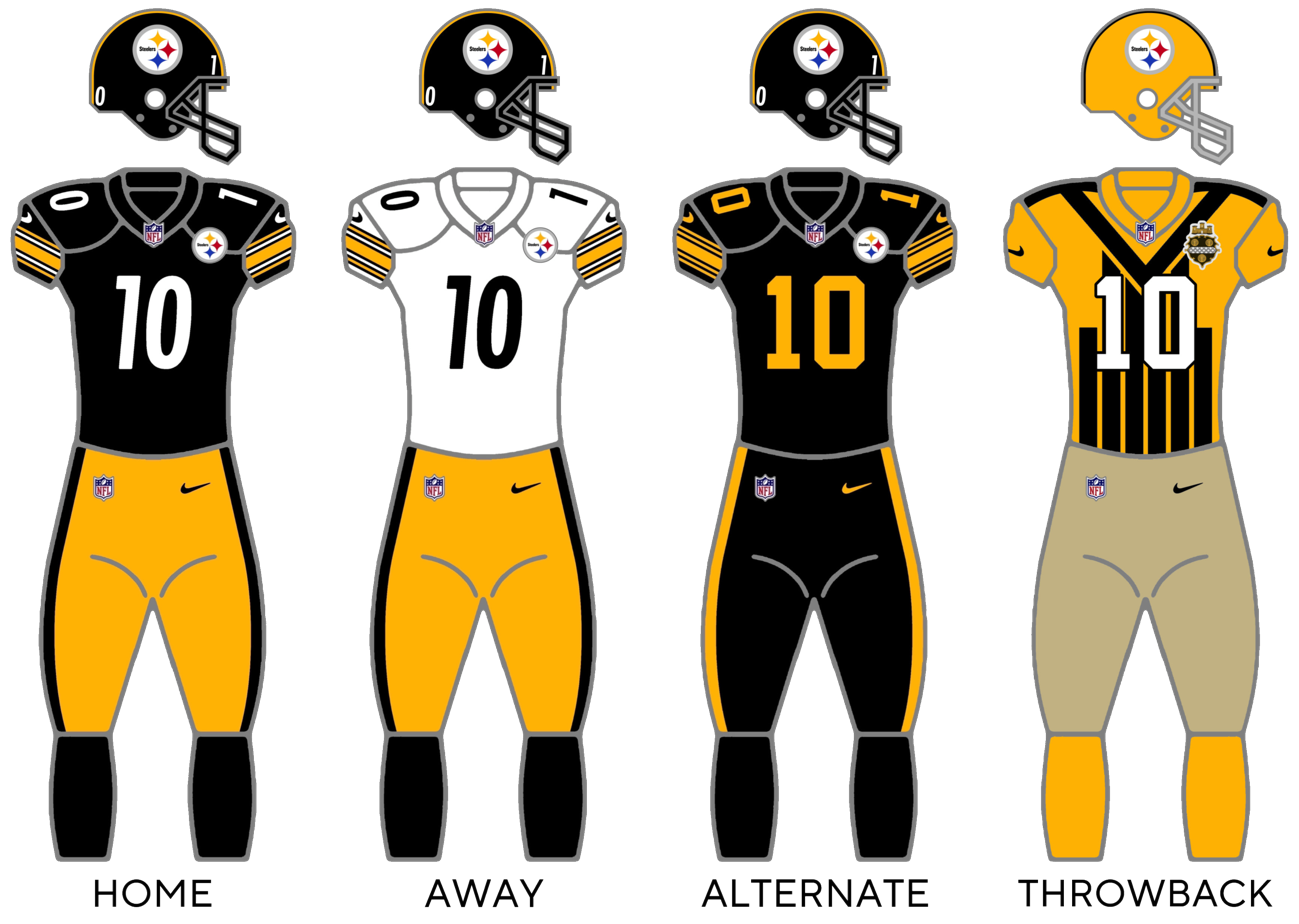
- Uniforms

General information
- Founded: July 8, 1933; 93 years ago
- Stadium: Acrisure Stadium; Pittsburgh, Pennsylvania
- Headquartered: UPMC Rooney Sports Complex, Pittsburgh, Pennsylvania; Training camp: Latrobe, Pennsylvania
- Colors: Black, gold, white
- Fight songs: "Renegade" (third quarter or fourth quarter) "Here We Go" (unofficial)
- Mascot: Steely McBeam
- Website: steelers.com

Personnel
- Owner: Rooney family
- General manager: Omar Khan
- Head coach: Mike McCarthy
- President: Art Rooney II

Nicknames
- Steel Curtain (defensive line, 1971–1981); The Black and Gold; Blitzburgh; Rooneymen

Team history
- Pittsburgh Pirates (1933–1939); Pittsburgh Steelers (1940–1942); Phil-Pitt "Steagles" (1943); Card-Pitt (1944); Pittsburgh Steelers (1945–present)

Home fields
- Forbes Field (1933–1963); Pitt Stadium (1958–1969); Three Rivers Stadium (1970–2000); Acrisure Stadium (2001–present); Temporary stadiums 1943 due to loss of players during World War II (temporary merger with Philadelphia Eagles): Shibe Park (four games); 1944 due to loss of players during World War II (temporary merger with Chicago Cardinals): Comiskey Park (two games)

League / conference affiliations
- National Football League (1933–present): Eastern Division (1933–1943, 1945–1949); Western Division (1944); American Conference (1950–1952); Eastern Conference (1953–1969); Century Division (1967–1969); American Football Conference (1970–present); AFC Central (1970–2001); AFC North (2002–present)

Championships
- Super Bowl championships: 6 1974 (IX), 1975 (X), 1978 (XIII), 1979 (XIV), 2005 (XL), 2008 (XLIII)
- Conference championships: 8: AFC: 1974, 1975, 1978, 1979, 1995, 2005, 2008, 2010
- Division championships: 25: AFC Central: 1972, 1974, 1975, 1976, 1977, 1978, 1979, 1983, 1984, 1992, 1994, 1995, 1996, 1997, 2001; AFC North: 2002, 2004, 2007, 2008, 2010, 2014, 2016, 2017, 2020, 2025

Playoff appearances (36)
- NFL: 1947, 1972, 1973, 1974, 1975, 1976, 1977, 1978, 1979, 1982, 1983, 1984, 1989, 1992, 1993, 1994, 1995, 1996, 1997, 2001, 2002, 2004, 2005, 2007, 2008, 2010, 2011, 2014, 2015, 2016, 2017, 2020, 2021, 2023, 2024, 2025

Owner
- Rooney family (1933–present)

The Pittsburgh Steelers are a professional American football team based in Pittsburgh. The Steelers compete in the National Football League (NFL) as a member of the American Football Conference (AFC) North division. Founded in 1933, the Steelers are the seventh-oldest franchise in the NFL, and the oldest franchise in the AFC.

In contrast with their status as a perennial losing franchise in the pre-merger NFL, where they were the oldest team never to have won a league championship, the Steelers of the post-merger (modern) era are among the most successful NFL franchises, especially during their dynasty in the 1970s. The team is tied with the New England Patriots for the most Super Bowl titles, with six, and holds the NFL record with 16 conference championship game appearances and 11 hosted. The Steelers have also won eight AFC championships, tied with the Denver Broncos and trailing only the Patriots' record 12. They are also tied with the Broncos, the Dallas Cowboys, and the San Francisco 49ers for the second-most Super Bowl appearances, with eight.

The Steelers, whose history may be traced to a regional pro team that was established in the early 1920s, joined the NFL as the Pittsburgh Pirates on July 8, 1933. The team was owned by Art Rooney and took its original name from the baseball team of the same name, as was common practice for NFL teams at the time. To distinguish them from the baseball team, local media took to calling the football team the Rooneymen, an unofficial nickname that persisted for decades after the team had adopted its current nickname. The ownership of the Steelers has remained within the Rooney family since the organization's founding. Art Rooney's son, Dan Rooney, owned the team from 1988 until his death in 2017. Much control of the franchise has been given to Dan Rooney's son, Art Rooney II.

The Steelers enjoy a large, widespread fanbase nicknamed Steeler Nation. They currently play their home games at Acrisure Stadium on Pittsburgh's North Side in the North Shore neighborhood, which also hosts the University of Pittsburgh Panthers. Built in 2001 as Heinz Field, the stadium replaced Three Rivers Stadium, which had hosted the Steelers for 31 seasons. Prior to Three Rivers, the Steelers had played their games in Pitt Stadium and at Forbes Field.

== History ==
=== The pre-merger era (1933–1968) ===
Art Rooney, founder of the Steelers

Art Rooney, a Pittsburgh native and accomplished multi-sport athlete, developed a passion for football that led him to found the semi-professional Hope-Harvey Football Club as a teenager, widely considered the precursor to the Steelers.

In May 1933, Rooney was awarded an NFL franchise for a $2,500 fee, establishing the Pittsburgh Professional Football Club (later renamed the Steelers), which began play that season as the Pittsburgh Pirates at Forbes Field.

The Steelers first took to the field as the Pittsburgh Pirates on September 20, 1933, losing 23–2 to the New York Giants. Through the 1930s, the Pirates never finished higher than second place in their division, or with a record better than .500 (1936). Pittsburgh did make history in 1938 by signing Byron White, a future Justice of the U.S. Supreme Court, to what was at the time the biggest contract in NFL history, but he played only one year with the Pirates before signing with the Detroit Lions. Prior to the 1940 season, the Pirates renamed themselves the Steelers.

During World War II, the Steelers experienced player shortages. They twice merged with other NFL franchises to field a team. During the 1943 season, they merged with the Philadelphia Eagles forming the "Phil-Pitt Eagles" and were known as the "Steagles". This team went 5–4–1. In 1944, they merged with the Chicago Cardinals and were known as Card-Pitt (or, mockingly, as the "Carpets"). This team finished 0–10, marking the only winless team in franchise history.

The Steelers made the playoffs for the first time in 1947, tying for first place in the division at 8–4 with the Philadelphia Eagles. This forced a tie-breaking playoff game at Forbes Field, which the Steelers lost 21–0. That would be Pittsburgh's only playoff game in the pre-merger era; they did qualify for a "Playoff Bowl" in 1962 as the second-best team in their conference, but this was not considered an official playoff.

In 1970, the year they moved into Three Rivers Stadium and the year of the AFL–NFL merger, the Pittsburgh Steelers were one of three old-guard NFL teams to switch to the newly formed American Football Conference (the others being the Cleveland Browns and the Baltimore Colts), in order to equalize the number of teams in the two conferences of the newly merged league. The Steelers also received a $3 million ($24.9 million today) relocation fee, which was a windfall for them; for years they rarely had enough to build a true contending team.

=== Chuck Noll years (1969–1991) ===
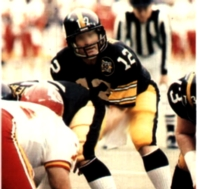
Hall of Fame quarterback Terry Bradshaw led the Steelers to four Super Bowl titles during the 1970s.

The Steelers' history of bad luck changed with the hiring of coach Chuck Noll from the NFL champion Baltimore Colts for the 1969 season. Noll's most remarkable talent was in his draft selections, taking Hall of Famers "Mean" Joe Greene in 1969, Terry Bradshaw and Mel Blount in 1970, Jack Ham in 1971, Franco Harris in 1972, and finally, in 1974, pulling off the incredible feat of selecting four Hall of Famers in one draft year: Lynn Swann, Jack Lambert, John Stallworth, and Mike Webster. The Pittsburgh Steelers' 1974 draft was their best ever; no other team has ever drafted four future Hall of Famers in one year, and only very few (including the 1970 Steelers) have drafted two or more in one year.

A pivotal moment in franchise history came during the 1972 season with the "Immaculate Reception," when Franco Harris caught a deflected pass and returned it for a game-winning touchdown against the Oakland Raiders in the playoffs—securing the Steelers' first postseason victory ever and signaling the beginning of their rise to prominence. The play is often cited as one of the greatest in NFL history.

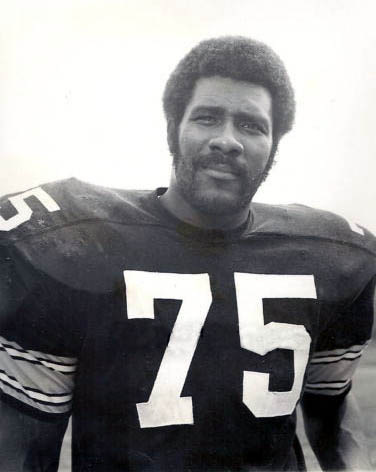
"Mean" Joe Greene is often cited as among the greatest defensive players in NFL history.

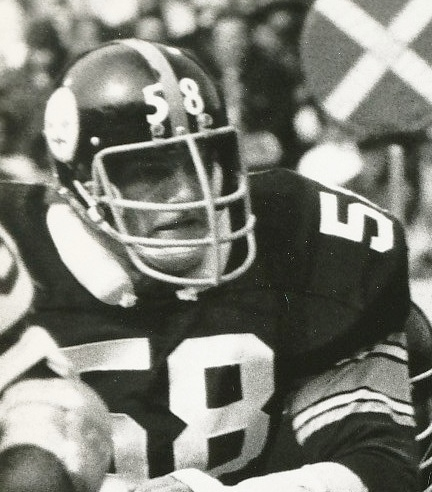
Jack Lambert became one of the most recognizable defensive players in Steelers history in part because of his distinctive toothless snarl.

At the core of the Steelers' dominance was the famed "Steel Curtain" defense, anchored by Joe Greene, L.C. Greenwood, Ernie Holmes, and Dwight White along the defensive line, with linebackers Jack Lambert, Jack Ham, and Andy Russell providing elite support. Known for its physicality, discipline, and relentless pass rush, the Steel Curtain became one of the most feared defensive units in NFL history, consistently ranking among the league's best and helping define the team's identity throughout the 1970s.

The players drafted in the early 1970s formed the base of an NFL dynasty, making the playoffs in eight seasons and becoming the only team in NFL history to win four Super Bowls in six years, as well as the first to win more than two; capturing championships in Super Bowls IX, X, XIII, and XIV. They also enjoyed a regular-season streak of 49 consecutive wins (1971–1979) against teams that would finish with a losing record that year.

Offensively, quarterback Terry Bradshaw evolved into a premier deep passer, connecting with receivers Lynn Swann and John Stallworth for numerous big plays, while Franco Harris anchored a powerful running game behind a dominant offensive line led by Mike Webster. The team's balanced attack, combined with its elite defense, made Pittsburgh nearly unbeatable at its peak.

Following their championship run, the Steelers remained competitive but began to decline as injuries and aging took their toll. The Steelers suffered a rash of injuries in the 1980 season and missed the playoffs with a 9–7 record. The 1981 season was no better, with an 8–8 showing. The team was then hit with the retirements of all their key players from the Super Bowl years. "Mean" Joe Greene retired after the 1981 season, Lynn Swann and Jack Ham after 1982's playoff berth, Terry Bradshaw and Mel Blount after 1983's divisional championship, and Jack Lambert after 1984's AFC Championship Game appearance.

After those retirements, the franchise skidded to its first losing seasons since 1971. Though still competitive, the Steelers would not finish above .500 in 1985, 1986, and 1988. In 1987, the year of the players' strike, the Steelers finished with a record of 8–7, but missed the playoffs. In 1989, they would reach the second round of the playoffs on the strength of Merrill Hoge and Rod Woodson before narrowly missing the playoffs in each of the next two seasons, Noll's last seasons.

Chuck Noll retired following the 1991 season, finishing his tenure with a 209–156–1 record. He is widely regarded as one of the greatest coaches in NFL history, credited with transforming the Steelers from one of the league's worst franchises into a model organization and establishing a legacy of stability, toughness, and championship success.

=== Bill Cowher years (1992–2006) ===
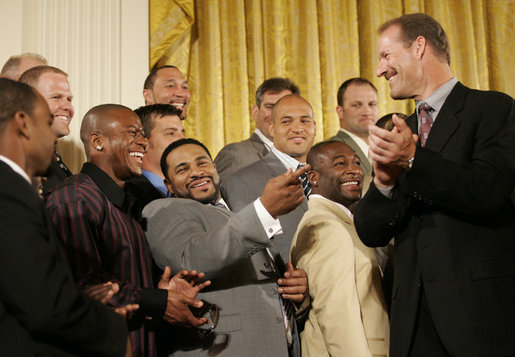
Members of the Pittsburgh Steelers visit the White House following their Super Bowl XL victory, with Jerome Bettis at center pointing toward head coach Bill Cowher.

In 1992, Chuck Noll retired and was succeeded by Kansas City Chiefs defensive coordinator Bill Cowher, a native of the Pittsburgh suburb of Crafton.

Cowher led the Steelers to the playoffs in each of his first six seasons, a feat that had been accomplished only by legendary coach Paul Brown of the Cleveland Browns. In those first six seasons, Cowher coached them as deep as the AFC Championship Game three times and following the 1995 season an appearance in Super Bowl XXX on the strength of the "Blitzburgh" defense, led by stars such as Rod Woodson and Greg Lloyd. However, the Steelers lost to the Dallas Cowboys in Super Bowl XXX, two weeks after a thrilling AFC Championship victory over the Indianapolis Colts.

Throughout Cowher's tenure, the team was anchored by key players on both sides of the ball, including Hall of Fame defensive back Rod Woodson and, later, power running back Jerome Bettis, whose bruising running style became the focal point of Pittsburgh's offense. A major turning point came in 2004 with the drafting of quarterback Ben Roethlisberger, who quickly emerged as the franchise's long-term leader and helped usher in a new era of success. Cowher ultimately delivered the franchise's record-tying fifth Super Bowl win in Super Bowl XL over the NFC champion Seattle Seahawks ten years later. With that victory, the Steelers became the third team to win five Super Bowls, and the first sixth-seeded playoff team to reach and win the Super Bowl since the NFL expanded to a 12-team post-season tournament in 1990. He coached through the 2006 season which ended with an 8–8 record, just short of the playoffs. Overall Cowher's teams reached the playoffs 10 of 15 seasons with six AFC Championship Games, two Super Bowl berths and a championship.

Cowher's career record with Pittsburgh was 149–90–1 in the regular season and 161–99–1 overall, including playoff games.

=== Mike Tomlin years (2007–2025) ===
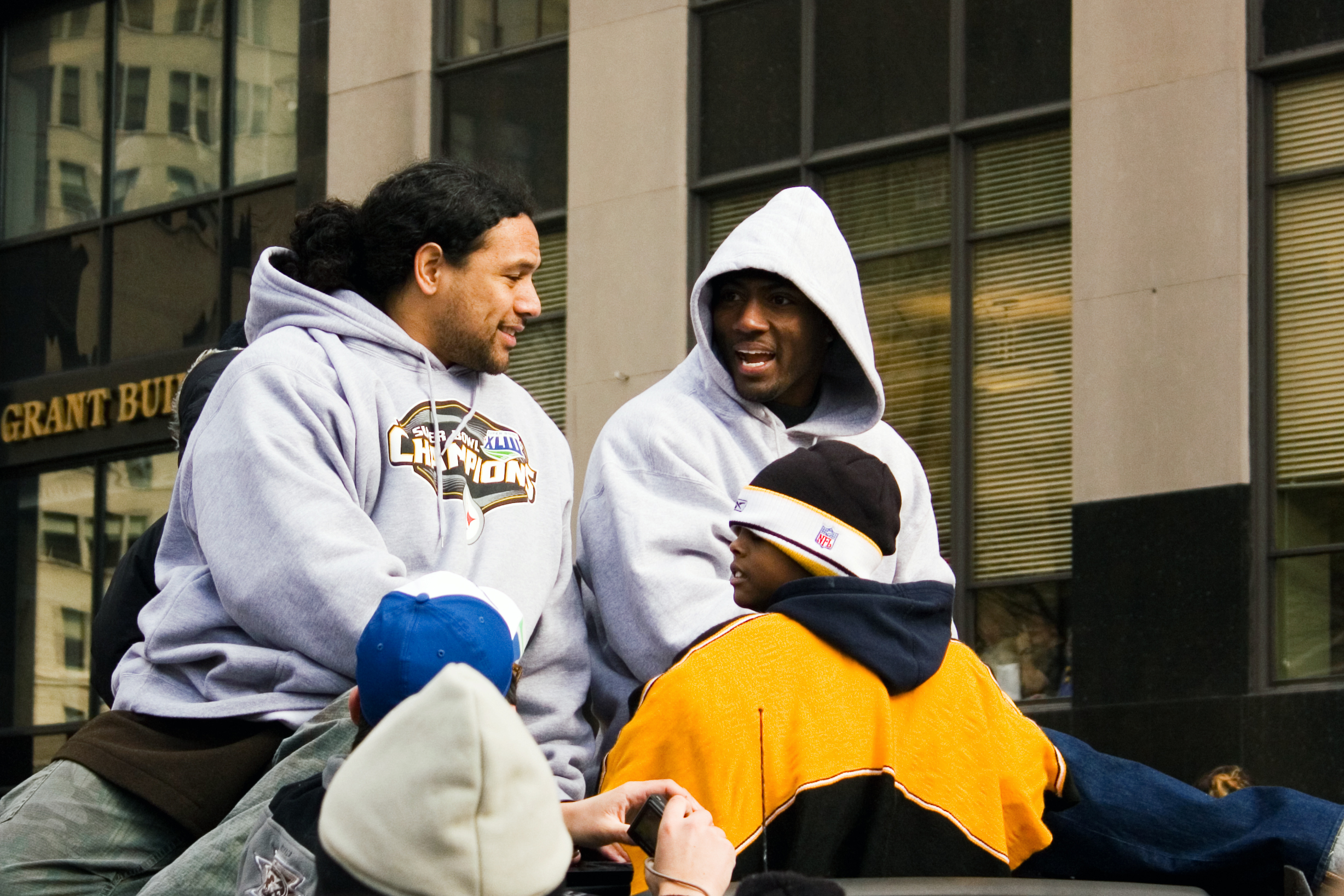
Steelers defenders Troy Polamalu (left) and Ryan Clark (right) at the Super Bowl XLIII victory parade in Pittsburgh.

On January 7, 2007, Cowher resigned from coaching the Steelers, citing a need to spend more time with his family. He did not use the term "retire", leaving open a possible return to the NFL as coach of another team. A three-man committee consisting of Art Rooney II, Dan Rooney, and Kevin Colbert was set up to conduct interviews for the head coaching vacancy. On January 22, 2007, Minnesota Vikings defensive coordinator Mike Tomlin was announced as Cowher's successor as head coach. Tomlin became the first African-American to be named head coach of the team in its 75-year history.

Tomlin inherited a team rich in talent, including stars such as safety Troy Polamalu, linebacker James Harrison, and wide receiver Hines Ward, who had been central figures in the Steelers' Super Bowl XL championship. In his first season, he led the Steelers to a 10–6 record and AFC North title. The team fell to the Jacksonville Jaguars 31–29 in the Wild Card Round to end the season. The following year, he led the Steelers to a 12–4 mark and a division title. With wins over the San Diego Chargers in the Divisional Round and the Baltimore Ravens in the AFC Championship, Tomlin became the third consecutive Steelers Head Coach to go to the Super Bowl, equaling the Dallas Cowboys (Tom Landry, Jimmy Johnson and Barry Switzer) in this achievement.

On February 1, 2009, Tomlin led the Steelers to their second Super Bowl of this decade, and went on to win 27–23 against the Arizona Cardinals. The win was highlighted by key contributions from the team's veteran core, including Harrison's iconic 100-yard interception return for a touchdown, and Ben Roethlisberger's game-winning drive, capped by a toe-tap touchdown pass to Santonio Holmes. At age 36, he was the youngest head coach to ever win the Super Bowl, and he is only the second African-American coach to ever win the Super Bowl (Tony Dungy was the first). In their title defense, the Steelers went 9–7 and missed the postseason in the 2009 season.

In the 2010 season, Tomlin led the team to a 12–4 record and an AFC North title. The team defeated the Baltimore Ravens in the Divisional Round and the New York Jets in the AFC Championship. Tomlin became the only coach to reach the Super Bowl twice before the age of 40 as he took the team to Super Bowl XLV on February 6, 2011. However, the Steelers were defeated by the Green Bay Packers, 31–25.

In the 2011 season, the Steelers made the postseason with a 12–4 record. They lost in overtime to the Denver Broncos in the Wild Card Round. The Steelers recorded their 400th victory in Week 8 of the 2012 season after defeating the Washington Redskins. Overall, the Steelers went 8–8 and missed the postseason in 2012. In the 2013 season, the Steelers went 8–8 and missed the postseason.

In the 2014 season, the Steelers won the AFC North with an 11–5 record. They lost 30–17 to the Baltimore Ravens in the Wild Card Round. The Steelers finished with a 10–6 record and made the playoffs in the 2015 season. They defeated the Cincinnati Bengals in the Wild Card Round and lost to the Denver Broncos in the Divisional Round. In the 2016 season, the Steelers won the AFC North with an 11–5 record. They defeated the Miami Dolphins in the Wild Card Round and the Kansas City Chiefs in the Divisional Round before falling to the New England Patriots in the AFC Championship.

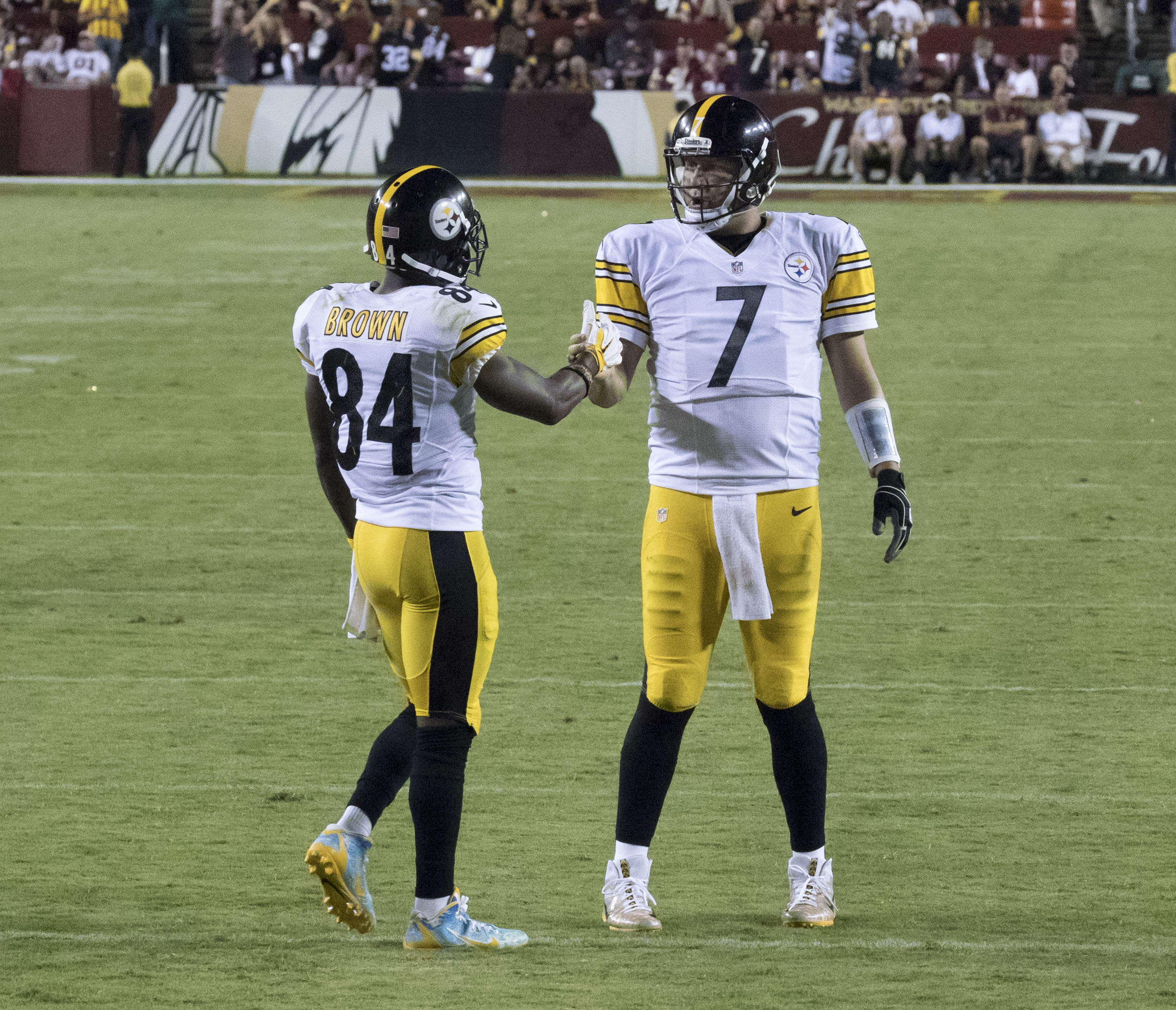
Antonio Brown and Ben Roethlisberger rank first in Steelers history among quarterback–wide receiver duo's in receptions, receiving yards, and touchdowns.

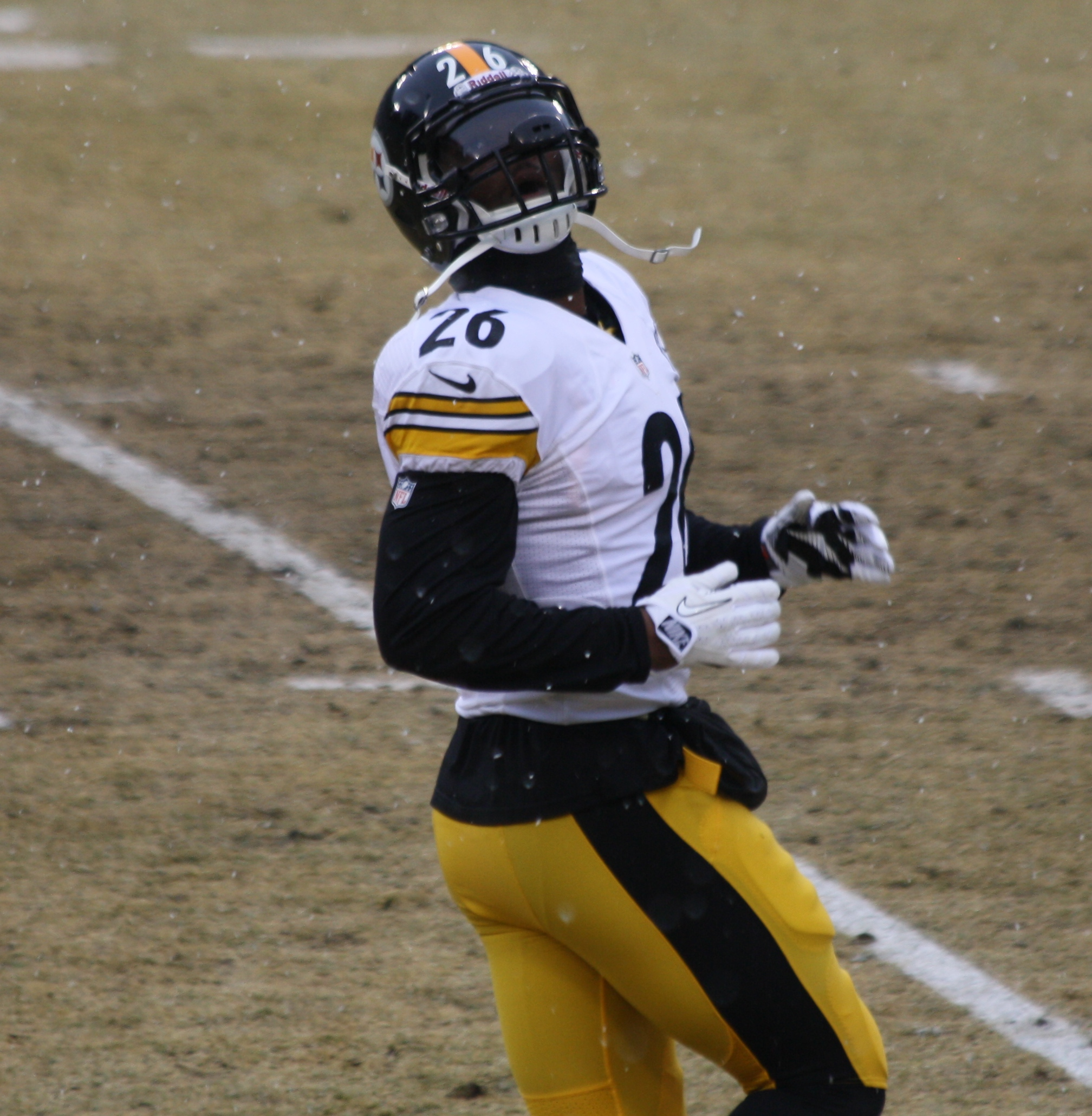
Le'Veon Bell's arrival in 2013 helped transform the Steelers into one of the league's top offenses, as the "Killer B's" began to take shape.

The 2013–17 seasons were noted for record performances from the "Killer B's". This trio consisted of Antonio Brown, Ben Roethlisberger and Le'Veon Bell. Occasionally, the "Killer B's" has also included kicker Chris Boswell due to his ability to hit game-winning field goals.

In the 2017 season, the Steelers won the AFC North with a 13–3 mark. Their postseason was short lived with a 45–42 loss to the Jacksonville Jaguars. Despite a 9–6–1 record in the 2018 season, the Steelers missed the playoffs. The Steelers went 8–8 and missed the postseason in the 2019 season. The 2020 season saw the Steelers have franchise-best 11–0 start. However, the team faded at the end of the season to finish 12–4. The team lost in the Wild Card Round to the Cleveland Browns 48–37. The 2021 season saw the team go 9–7–1 and make the postseason. The Steelers lost 42–21 to the Kansas City Chiefs in the Wild Card Round. Longtime quarterback Ben Roethlisberger retired following the 2021 season.

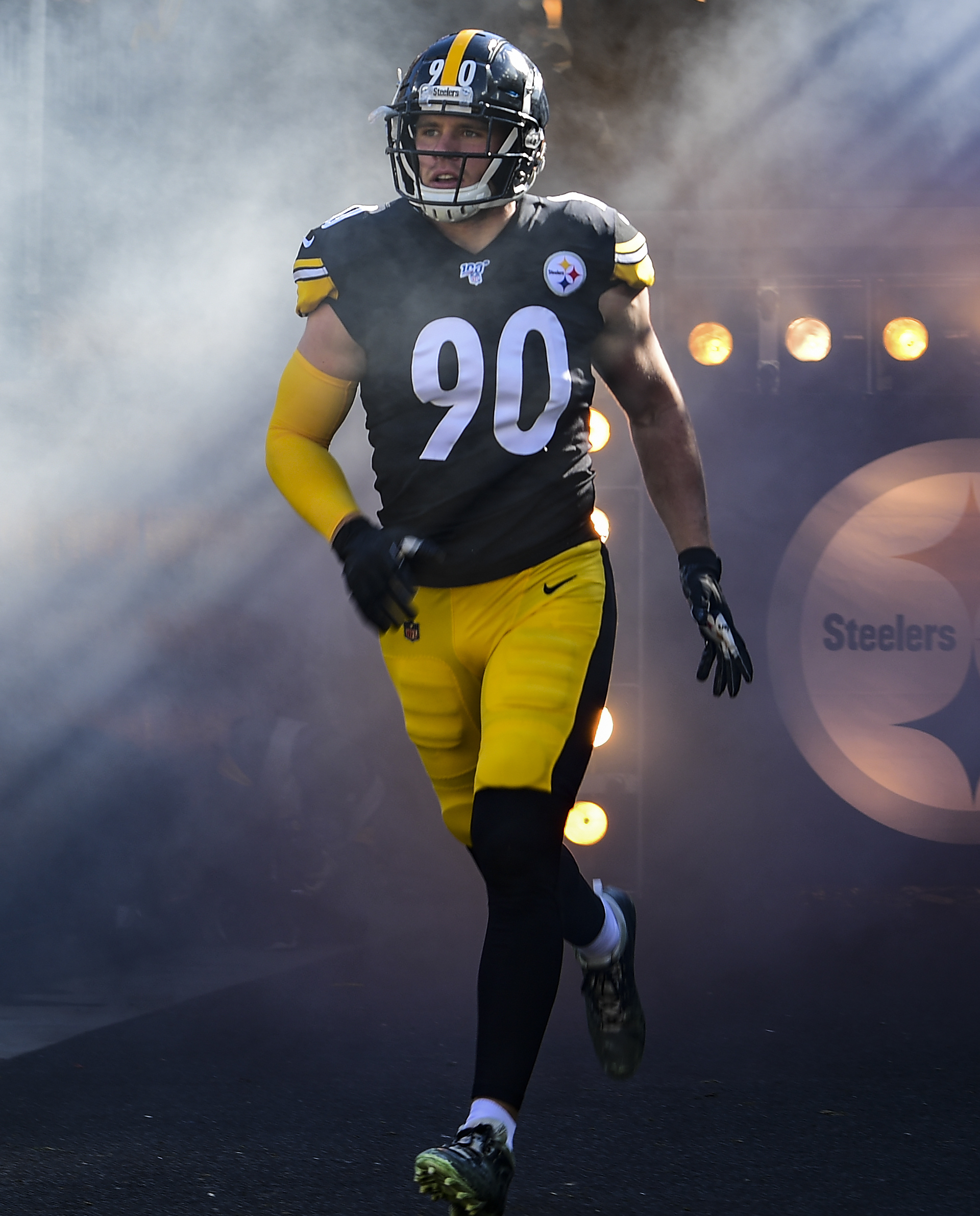
In 2021 T.J. Watt tied the single-season sack record, recording 22.5 sacks in 15 games.

During this period and into the late 2010s and early 2020s, the Steelers' identity continued to be defined by elite defensive play. Anchored by All-Pro defensive tackle Cameron Heyward and star edge rusher T.J. Watt, the unit remained one of the league's most formidable. Watt, the 2021 NFL Defensive Player of the Year, emerged as one of the premier pass rushers of his generation, while Heyward provided consistent leadership and dominance along the defensive line. Alongside key contributors such as Minkah Fitzpatrick, the Steelers' defense helped keep the team competitive even as the roster underwent significant changes following the decline of the "Killer B's" era.

Prior to the 2022 season, the team drafted Pitt quarterback Kenny Pickett with their first-round pick in the 2022 NFL draft. Pickett started 12 games as the Steelers went 9–8 and missed the postseason in the 2022 season. In the 2023 season, the team finished 10–7 and third in the AFC North. They made the playoffs and were defeated by the Buffalo Bills in the Wild Card Round 31–17. Prior to the 2024 season, the Steelers traded Pickett to the Philadelphia Eagles. The team traded for Justin Fields from the Chicago Bears and signed Russell Wilson, who was released from the Denver Broncos. Prior to the 2025 season, the team signed four-time MVP Aaron Rodgers.

After the 2025 season, Tomlin stepped down as the Steelers head coach. He concluded his 19-year tenure with a 193–114–2 regular-season record and an 8–12 playoff mark. Notably, none of his teams finished with a losing record.

=== Mike McCarthy years (2026–present) ===
On January 26, 2026, the Steelers hired veteran NFL coach Mike McCarthy as their new head coach. This marked only the fourth head coaching hire for the franchise since 1969, underscoring the organization's longstanding stability. McCarthy was reunited with quarterback Aaron Rodgers, with whom he previously won Super Bowl XLV—ironically defeating the Steelers in their most recent Super Bowl appearance.

== Franchise overview ==
=== Ownership ===
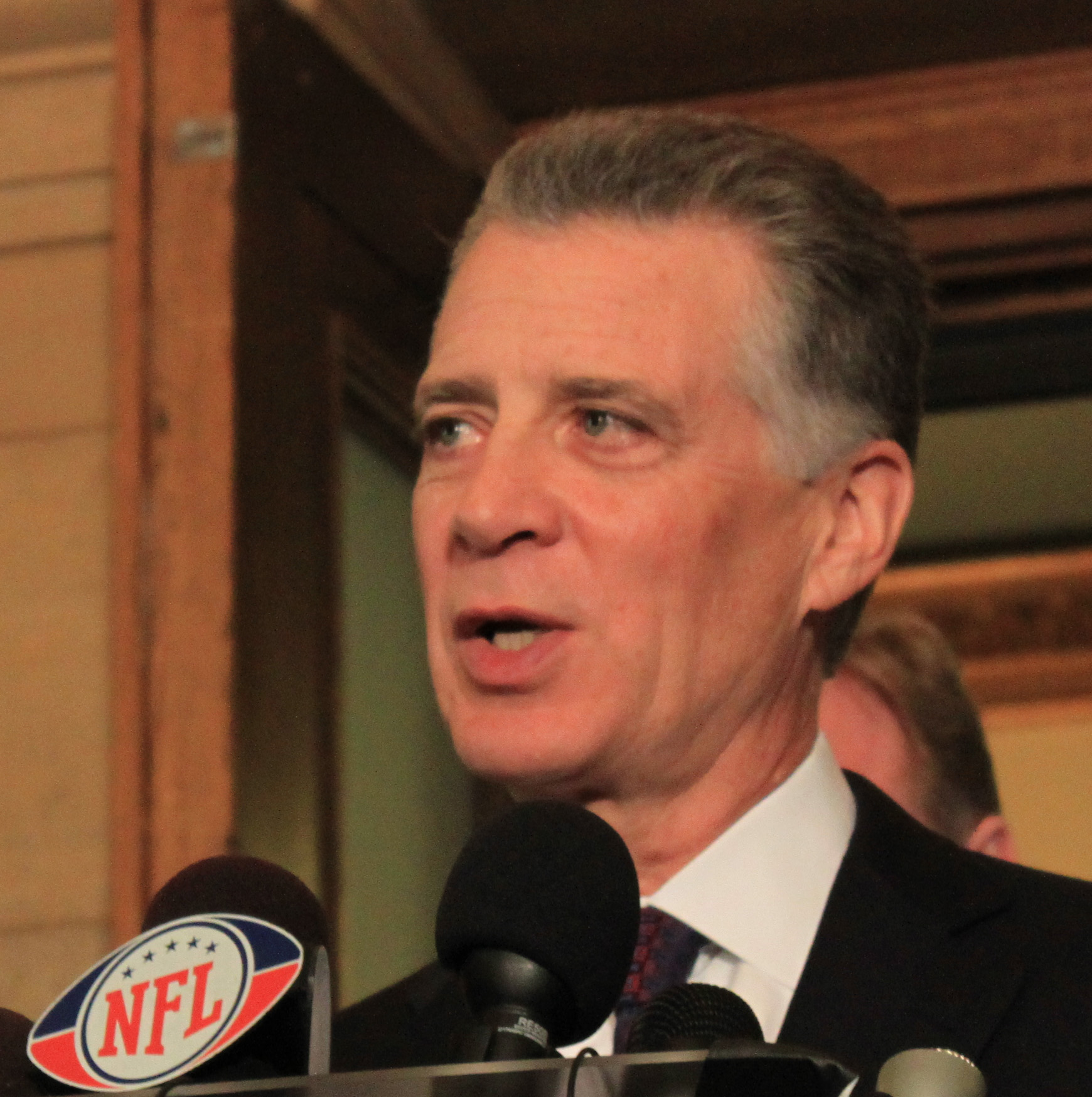
Art Rooney II, controlling owner of the Steelers

Since 2008, the Rooney family has brought in several investors for the team while retaining control of the team itself. This came about so that the team could comply with NFL ownership regulations. Dan Rooney, and his son, Art Rooney II, president of the franchise, wanted to stay involved with the franchise, while two of the brothers – Timothy and Patrick – wanted to further pursue racetracks that they own in Florida and New York. Since 2006, many of the racetracks have added video slot machines, causing them to violate "NFL policy that prohibits involvement with racetrack and gambling interests".

Upon Dan Rooney's death in 2017, he and Art Rooney II retained control of the team with the league-minimum 30%, the following made up the other investors at the time:

- Several other members of the Rooney family, including Art Rooney Jr., John Rooney, and the McGinley family, who are cousins to the Rooneys.
- The Robert A. Paul family of Pittsburgh and Los Angeles, which is primarily involved with Pittsburgh-based Ampco Pittsburgh Corporation as well as Morton's Restaurant Group, Urban Active Fitness, Meyer Products and Harley Marine Services. Additionally, family members serve on numerous boards, including Cornell University, UPMC, University of Pittsburgh, the American Red Cross, Harvard Medical School and the Loomis Chaffee School.
- Former Steelers wide receiver John Stallworth, a member of the Pro Football Hall of Fame.
- Legendary Pictures president and CEO Thomas Tull.
- GTCR chairman Bruce V. Rauner.
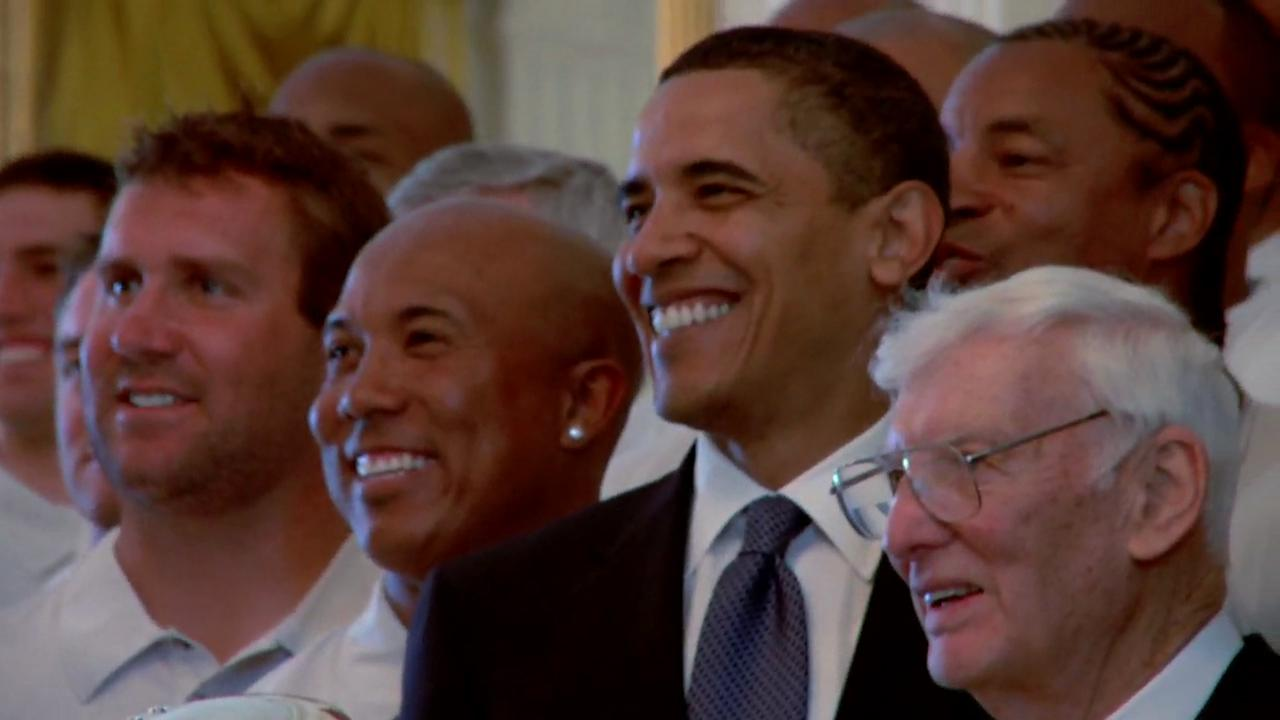
  President Obama poses with the Steelers in 2009. Left to right: Ben Roethlisberger, Hines Ward, Obama, and Dan Rooney.
- The Peter Varischetti family of Brockway, which owns several nursing homes and a commercial real estate business.
- Paul Evanson, chairman, president, and CEO of Allegheny Energy.
- Russ and Scott Swank of Lower Burrell.

Three minority investors in the Steelers have since become majority owners of other NFL teams:

- Pilot Flying J CEO Jimmy Haslam purchased the Cleveland Browns in 2012.
- Hedge fund manager David Tepper purchased the Carolina Panthers in 2018.
- Philadelphia 76ers and New Jersey Devils owner Josh Harris purchased the Washington Commanders in 2023. Investment partner David Blitzer was also a part of the Harris group.

=== Season-by-season records ===
Through the end of the 2025 season, the Steelers have an all-time record of 727–622–22 (.530), including playoffs. In recent decades, the Steelers have remained consistently competitive, qualifying for the playoffs seven times in the past ten seasons while capturing four division titles.

The Pittsburgh Steelers hold an all-time regular-season record of 691–592–22 (.529) and a playoff record of 36–30 (.545). Overall, the franchise has reached the postseason 36 times, won 25 division titles, appeared in 16 AFC Championship Games, and captured six Super Bowl titles in eight appearances. They are also notable for their long-term consistency, as they have not recorded a season with 12 or more losses since the NFL expanded to a 16-game schedule in 1978.

Since the AFL–NFL merger in 1970, the Steelers have been widely regarded as one of the league's most successful and stable franchises. They rank among the top teams in total regular-season victories, playoff wins, division titles, and conference championship appearances during this era. The Steelers are tied with the New England Patriots for the most Super Bowl wins with six championships. They have also produced numerous Pro Bowl, All-Pro, and Hall of Fame players.

=== Civil rights advocacy ===
The franchise, along with the Rooney family have for generations been strong advocates for equality of opportunity for both minorities and women. Among these achievements of the Steelers was the first to hire an African-American assistant coach (September 29, 1957, with Lowell Perry), the first to start an African-American quarterback (December 3, 1973, with Joe Gilliam), (Note: Although Marlin Briscoe is sometimes erroneously cited as the first African-American starting quarterback in 1968, this was not for an NFL team and not in an NFL game (the Denver Broncos, for which Briscoe played, were an American Football League team then), additionally the vast majority of Briscoe's career was not as quarterback.) the first team to boast of an African-American Super Bowl MVP (January 12, 1975, with Franco Harris), the first to hire an African-American Coordinator (September 2, 1984, with Tony Dungy), the first owner to push for passage of an "equal opportunity" mandating that at least one minority candidate is given an interview in all head coach hiring decisions throughout the league (the Rooney Rule in the early 2000s), and the first to hire a female as full-time athletic trainer (Ariko Iso on July 24, 2002).

== Championships ==
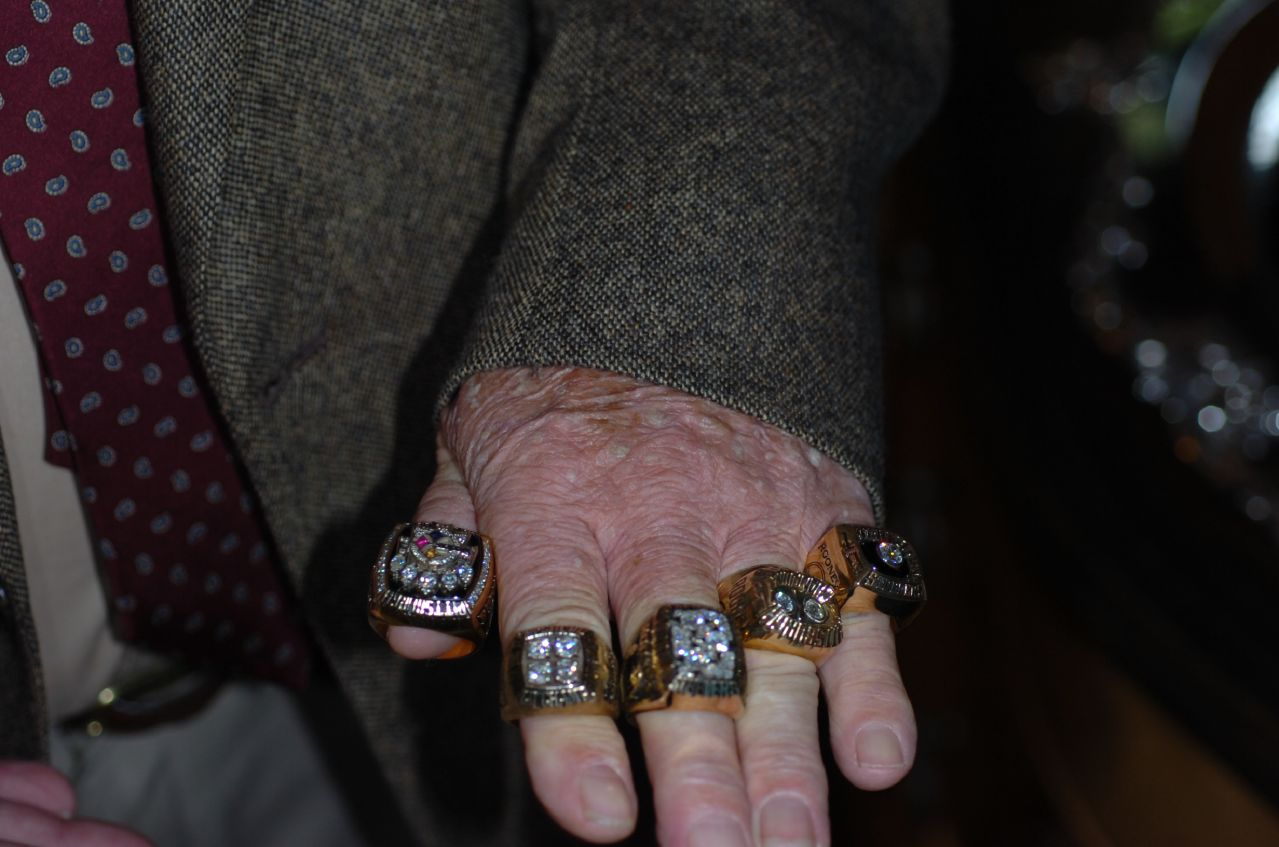
Steelers' five Super Bowl rings before 2009

=== Super Bowl championships ===
Season	Coach	Super Bowl	Location	Opponent	Score	Record
1974	Chuck Noll	IX	Tulane Stadium (New Orleans)	Minnesota Vikings	16–6	10–3–1
1975	Chuck Noll	X	Orange Bowl (Miami)	Dallas Cowboys	21–17	12–2
1978	Chuck Noll	XIII	Orange Bowl (Miami)	Dallas Cowboys	35–31	14–2
1979	Chuck Noll	XIV	Rose Bowl (Pasadena)	Los Angeles Rams	31–19	12–4
2005	Bill Cowher	XL	Ford Field (Detroit)	Seattle Seahawks	21–10	11–5
2008	Mike Tomlin	XLIII	Raymond James Stadium (Tampa)	Arizona Cardinals	27–23	13–3
Total Super Bowls won:						6

=== AFC championships ===
Season	Coach	Location	Opponent	Score
1974	Chuck Noll	Oakland-Alameda County Coliseum (Oakland)	Oakland Raiders	24–13
1975	Chuck Noll	Three Rivers Stadium (Pittsburgh)	Oakland Raiders	16–10
1978	Chuck Noll	Three Rivers Stadium (Pittsburgh)	Houston Oilers	34–5
1979	Chuck Noll	Three Rivers Stadium (Pittsburgh)	Houston Oilers	27–13
1995	Bill Cowher	Three Rivers Stadium (Pittsburgh)	Indianapolis Colts	20–16
2005	Bill Cowher	Invesco Field at Mile High (Denver)	Denver Broncos	34–17
2008	Mike Tomlin	Heinz Field (Pittsburgh)	Baltimore Ravens	23–14
2010	Mike Tomlin	Heinz Field (Pittsburgh)	New York Jets	24–19
Total AFC Championships won:				8

=== Division championships ===
The Steelers were a part of the NFL Eastern Division from 1933 to 1943 and were briefly in the Western Division in 1944, before returning to the Eastern Division until 1949. The team was then in the American Conference from 1950 to 1952, and the Eastern Conference from 1953 to 1966. They were then placed in the Century Division of the Eastern Conference in 1967. When the league reformed into the NFC and AFC in 1970, the Steelers were placed in the AFC Central until 2001 when they were realigned into the AFC North Division.

Year	Coach	Record
1972	Chuck Noll	11–3
1974	Chuck Noll	10–3–1
1975	Chuck Noll	12–2
1976	Chuck Noll	10–4
1977	Chuck Noll	9–5
1978	Chuck Noll	14–2
1979	Chuck Noll	12–4
1983	Chuck Noll	10–6
1984	Chuck Noll	9–7
1992	Bill Cowher	11–5
1994	Bill Cowher	12–4
1995	Bill Cowher	11–5
1996	Bill Cowher	10–6
1997	Bill Cowher	11–5
2001	Bill Cowher	13–3
2002	Bill Cowher	10–5–1
2004	Bill Cowher	15–1
2007	Mike Tomlin	10–6
2008	Mike Tomlin	12–4
2010	Mike Tomlin	12–4
2014	Mike Tomlin	11–5
2016	Mike Tomlin	11–5
2017	Mike Tomlin	13–3
2020	Mike Tomlin	12–4
2025	Mike Tomlin	10–7
Total Division Championships won:		25

== Logo and uniforms ==
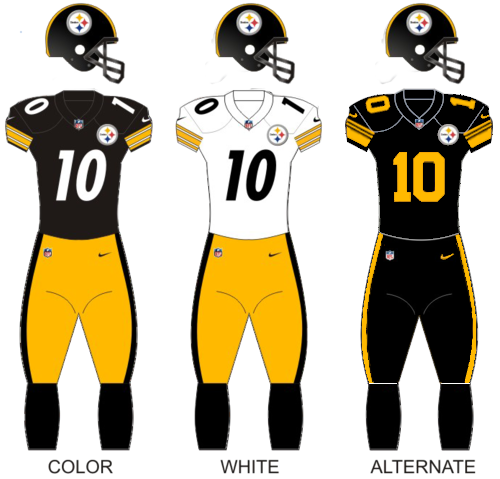
The Steelers current home, away, and alternate (color rush) uniform set.

The Steelers have used black and gold as their colors since the club's inception, the lone exception being the 1943 season when they merged with the Philadelphia Eagles and formed the "Steagles"; the team's colors at that time were green and white as a result of wearing Eagles uniforms. Originally, the team wore solid gold-colored helmets and black jerseys. The Steelers' black and gold colors are now shared by all major professional teams in the city, including the Pittsburgh Pirates in baseball and the Pittsburgh Penguins in ice hockey. The shade of gold differs slightly among teams: the Penguins have previously used "Vegas Gold", a color similar to metallic gold, and the Pirates' gold is a darker mustard yellow-gold, while the Steelers "gold" is more of a bright canary yellow. Black and gold are also the colors of the city's official flag.

The Steelers logo was introduced in 1962 and is based on the "Steelmark", originally designed by Pittsburgh's U.S. Steel and now owned by the American Iron and Steel Institute (AISI). In fact, it was Cleveland-based Republic Steel that suggested the Steelers adopt the industry logo. It consists of the word "Steelers" surrounded by three astroids (hypocycloids of four cusps). The original meanings behind the astroids were, "Steel lightens your work, brightens your leisure, and widens your world." Later, the colors came to represent the ingredients used in the steel-making process: yellow for coal, red for iron ore, and blue for scrap steel. While the formal Steelmark logo contains only the word "Steel", the team was given permission to add "ers" in 1963 after a petition to AISI.

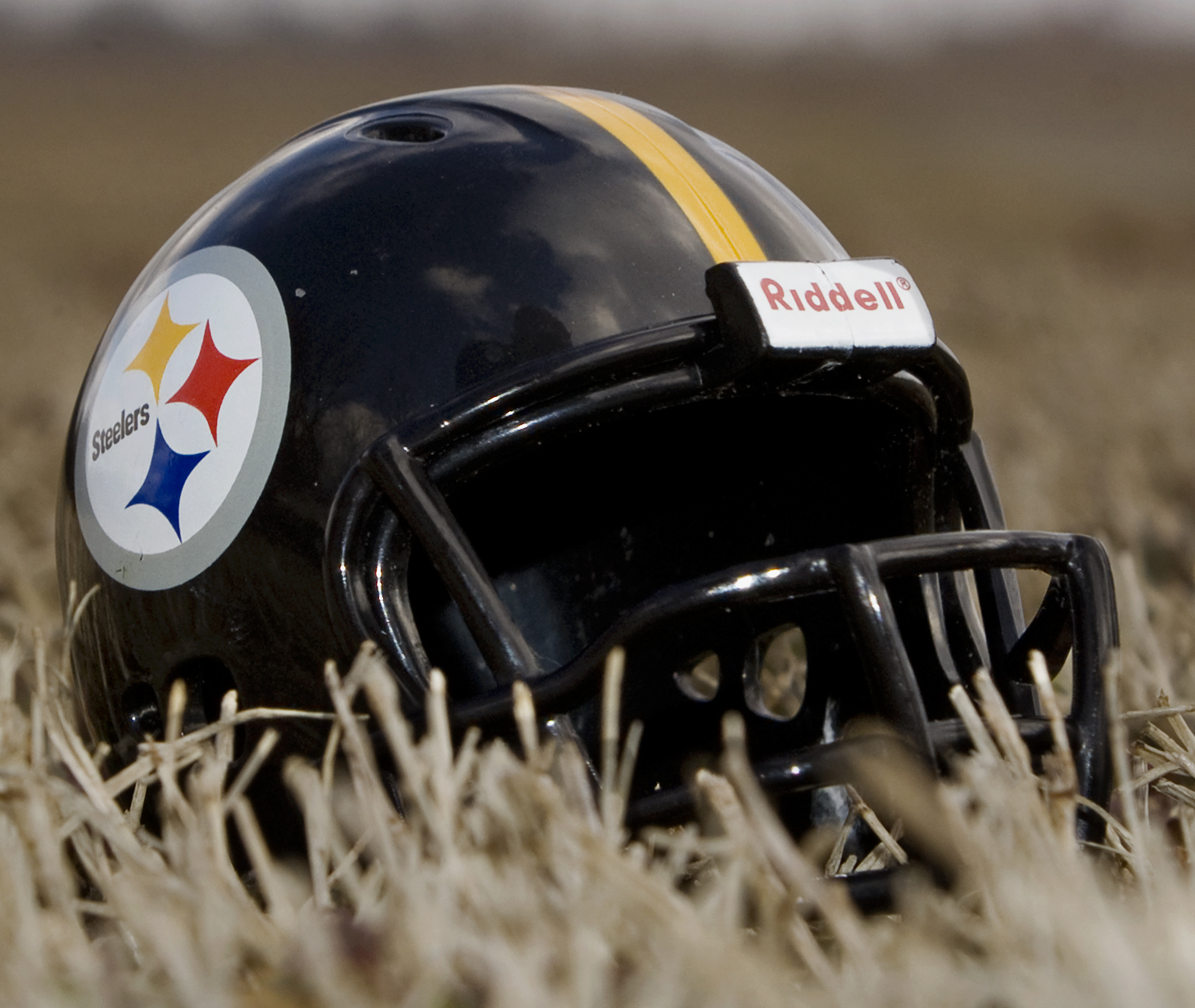
The Steelers logo incorporates the hypocycloid logo of the US Steel industry.

The Steelers are the only NFL team that puts its logo on only one side of the helmet (the right side). Longtime field and equipment manager Jack Hart was instructed to do this by Art Rooney as a test to see how the logo appeared on the gold helmets; however, its popularity led the team to leave it that way permanently. A year after introducing the logo, they switched to black helmets to make it stand out more.

The Steelers, along with the New York Giants, are one of only two teams in the National Football League to have the players' uniform numbers on both the front and back of the helmets.

The current uniform designs were introduced in 1968. The design consists of gold pants and either black jerseys or white jerseys, except for the 1970 and 1971 seasons when the Steelers wore white pants with their white jerseys. In 1997, the team switched to rounded numbers on the jersey to match the number font (Futura Condensed) on the helmets, and a Steelers logo was added to the left side of the jersey.

The 2007–2011 third uniform, consisting of a black jersey with gold lettering, white pants with black and gold stripes, and a gold helmet were first used during the Steelers' 75th anniversary season in 2007. They were meant to evoke the memory of the 1963–1964 era uniforms. The uniforms were so popular among fans that the Steelers' organization decided to keep them and use them as a third option during home games only.

In 2012, the Steelers introduced a new third uniform, consisting of a yellow jersey with black horizontal lines (making a bumble bee like pattern) with black lettering and black numbers placed inside a white box, to represent the jerseys worn by the Steelers in their 1934 season. The rest of the uniform consists of beige pants, yellow with black horizontal striped socks, and the Steelers regular black helmet. The uniforms were used for the Steelers' 80th anniversary season. Much like the previous alternate these jerseys were so popular that they were used up through the 2016 season. The jerseys were nicknamed the "bumblebee jerseys" due to looking like the pattern of a bumblebee. The jerseys were retired after the 2016 season.

Also in 2016, the Steelers introduced its alternate black Color Rush uniforms. These were based on the uniforms they wore from 1946 to 1965, but with black pants in place of either gold or white pants.

In 2018, the Steelers unveiled a third uniform based on those worn from 1968 to 1997, coinciding with the Steel Curtain teams of the 1970s. It is similar to the current uniforms but without the Steelers logo on the left chest and use block lettering and numbers in place of Futura Condensed.

Prior to the 2025 season, the Steelers brought back their 1933 gold throwback uniforms, including a gold alternate helmet similar to the previous one they wore with the 1960s throwback uniforms in the late 2000s.

In 1979, the team owners were approached by then-Iowa Hawkeyes Head Coach Hayden Fry about designing his fading college team's uniforms in the image of the Steelers. Three days later, the owners sent Fry the reproduction jerseys (home and away versions) of then quarterback Terry Bradshaw. Today, the Hawkeyes still retain the 1979 Steelers uniforms as their home, and away colors.

== Rivals ==
The Pittsburgh Steelers have three primary rivals, all within their division: the Cleveland Browns, Baltimore Ravens, and Cincinnati Bengals. They have also developed notable rivalries through postseason history with teams such as the Las Vegas Raiders, Dallas Cowboys, Denver Broncos, New England Patriots, and Tennessee Titans. Additionally, the Steelers share an intrastate rivalry with the Philadelphia Eagles, though the teams meet only once every four years under the NFL scheduling format.

=== Divisional rivals ===
==== Baltimore Ravens ====
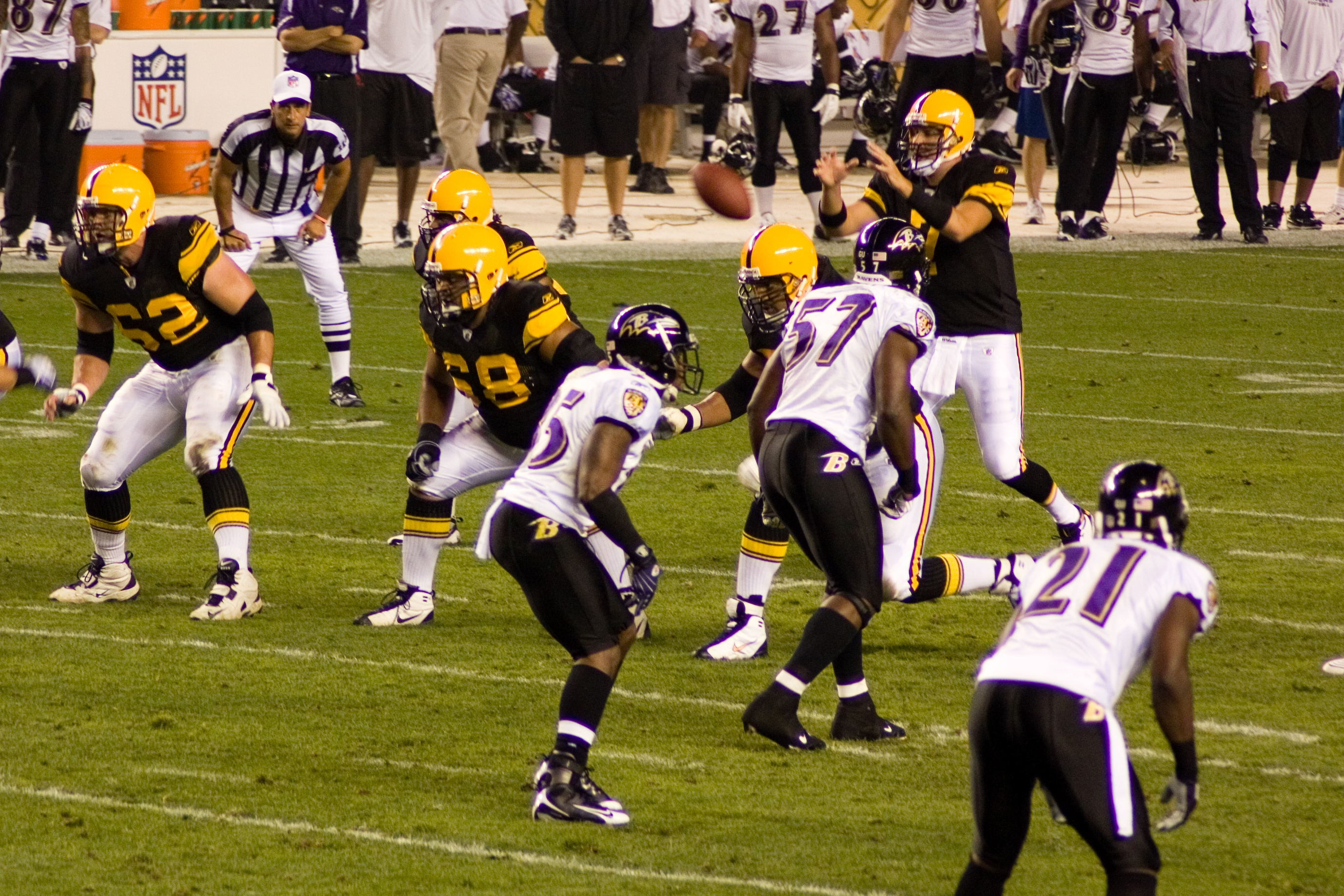
The Steelers on offense against the Ravens in 2008

The Steelers–Ravens rivalry is widely regarded as one of the NFL's most intense, defined by physical defense and frequent playoff implications. Since the Ravens' founding in 1996, the two teams have consistently competed for division titles, including multiple postseason meetings and the 2008 AFC Championship Game victory by Pittsburgh. The Steelers hold the edge in the all-time series with a 38-27 record, including a 3-2 record in the postseason. Since 2020, the Steelers are 10-3 against the Ravens.

==== Cleveland Browns ====
The Steelers–Browns rivalry dates to 1950 and is one of the oldest in the NFL. While Cleveland dominated early, Pittsburgh has largely controlled the series since the 1970s, particularly following the Browns' return in 1999. The teams have met three times in the postseason, with the Steelers winning two. The Steelers are 83-65-1 against the Browns all-time.

==== Cincinnati Bengals ====
The Steelers' rivalry with the Bengals began following the 1970 AFL–NFL merger and has been marked by physical play and heated matchups. Notable games include the 2005 AFC Wild Card victory by Pittsburgh en route to a Super Bowl XL title and a contentious 2015 playoff meeting, remembered for Vontaze Burfict's controversial late hit on Antonio Brown. The Steelers lead the all-time series 72-41.

=== Conference rivals ===
==== New England Patriots ====
The Steelers' rivalry with the Patriots developed in the 2000s through multiple postseason matchups. New England defeated Pittsburgh in the AFC Championship Game in 2001, 2004, and 2016, led by the Tom Brady and Bill Belichick dynasty, often serving as a major obstacle during Steelers playoff runs. The teams have remained competitive in regular-season play.

==== Tennessee Titans ====
Former division rivals as the Houston/Tennessee Oilers, the Steelers and Titans developed a competitive rivalry built on close games and postseason meetings. Though no longer in the same division, the matchup retains historical significance.

==== Denver Broncos ====
The Steelers and Broncos have met multiple times in the postseason, including AFC Championship Games in 1997 and 2005. The rivalry has featured notable moments across several decades, with Denver holding an edge in playoff meetings.

==== Las Vegas Raiders ====
One of the NFL's most historic rivalries, the Steelers and Raiders were central to the league's landscape in the 1970s. The rivalry includes the famous "Immaculate Reception" in 1972 and multiple AFC Championship Game matchups. While less prominent in recent years, it remains a defining part of both franchises' histories.

=== Interconference ===
==== Dallas Cowboys ====
The Steelers and Cowboys share one of the NFL's most prominent interconference rivalries, highlighted by their three Super Bowl matchups, the most of any two teams in league history. Pittsburgh won Super Bowls X and XIII, while Dallas won Super Bowl XXX. Many of these games featured future Hall of Fame players.

==== Philadelphia Eagles ====
The Steelers and Eagles have competed since 1933 in what is often referred to as the "Battle of Pennsylvania." Though initially frequent opponents, the teams now meet only periodically due to conference alignment. The Eagles lead the all-time series.

== Culture ==
=== Mascot ===
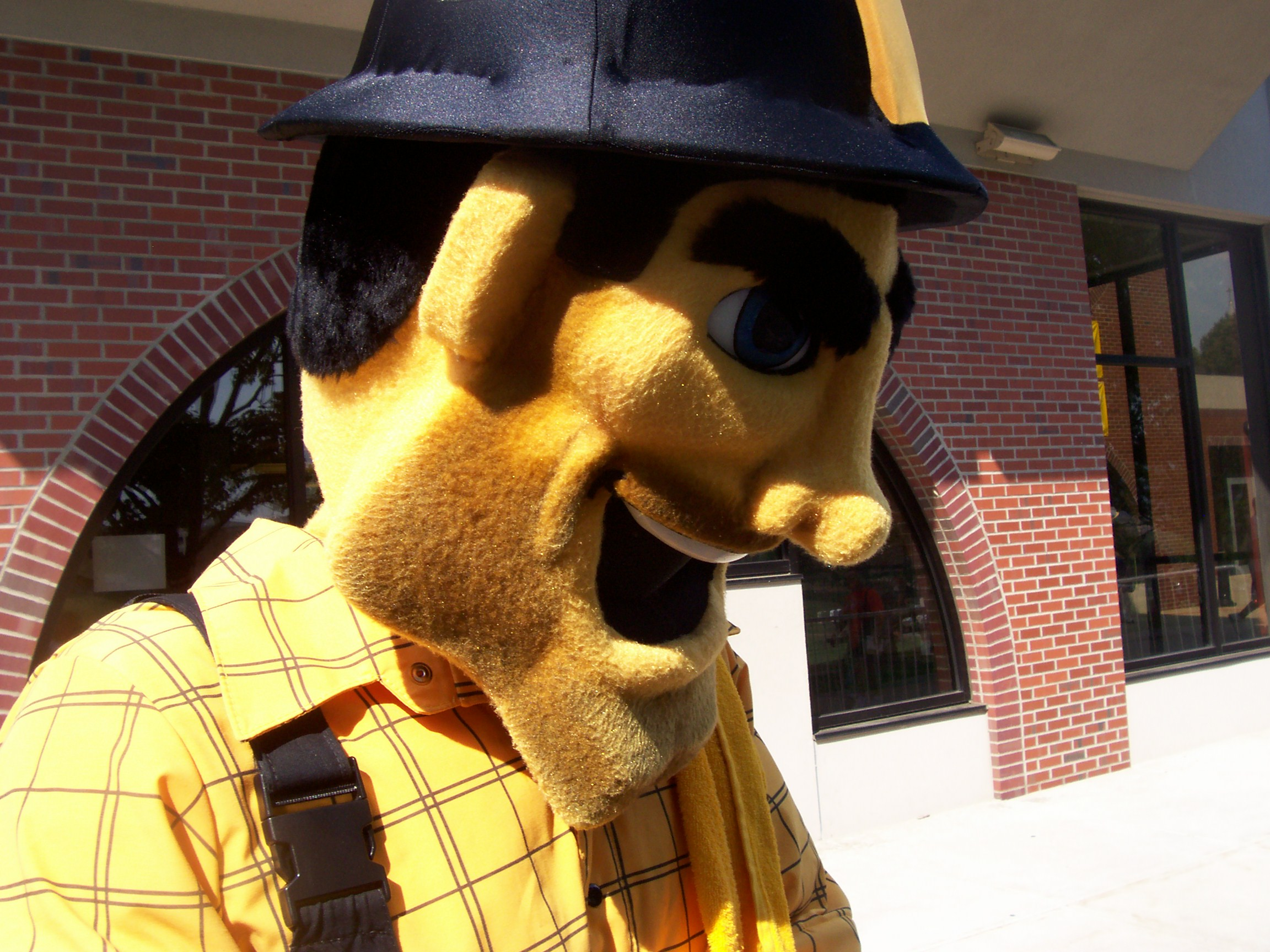
Steely McBeam signing autographs for fans at Steelers training camp on August 2, 2007

Prior to the 2007 season, the Steelers introduced Steely McBeam as their official mascot. As part of the 75th anniversary celebrations of the team, his name was selected from a pool of 70,000 suggestions submitted by fans of the team. Diane Roles of Middlesex Township, submitted the winning name which was "meant to represent steel for Pittsburgh's industrial heritage, "Mc" for the Rooney family's Irish roots, and Beam for the steel beams produced in Pittsburgh, as well as for Jim Beam, her husband's favorite alcoholic beverage." Steely McBeam is visible at all home games and participates in the team's charitable programs and other club-sponsored events. Steely's autograph is known to be drawn with an oversized S, and the L is drawn to look like a beam of steel.

=== Fanbase ===
The Steelers have a tradition of having a large fanbase, which has spread from Pittsburgh. In August 2008, ESPN.com ranked the Steelers' fans as the best in the NFL, citing their "unbelievable" sellout streak of 299 consecutive games. The team gained a large fan base nationally based on its success in the 1970s, but many consider the collapse of the city's steel industry at the end of the 1970s dynasty into the 1980s (and the resulting diaspora) to be a large catalyst for the size of the fan base in other cities. The Steelers have sold out every home game since the 1972 season.

The Pittsburgh Steelers have numerous unofficial fan clubs in many cities throughout the country, that typically meet in bars or taverns on game days. This phenomenon is known to occur for other NFL teams as well, but "Steeler bars" are more visible than most, including representative establishments even in cities that field their own NFL teams.

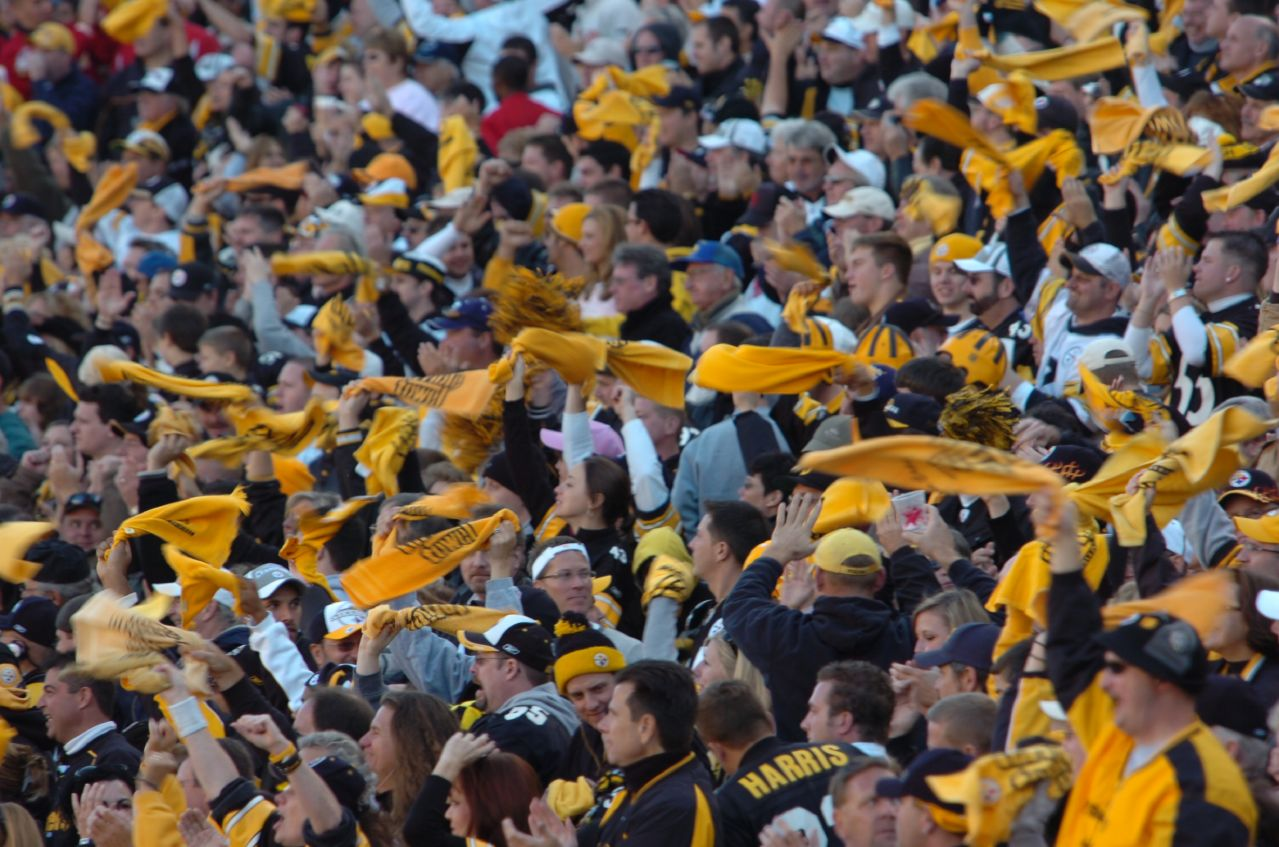
Steelers fans waving the Terrible Towel at Heinz Field — October 15, 2006

The Terrible Towel has been described by the Associated Press as "arguably the best-known fan symbol of any major pro sports team". Conceived of by broadcaster Myron Cope in 1975, the towel's rights have since been given to the Allegheny Valley School in Coraopolis, which cares for over 900 people with intellectual disability and physical disabilities, including Cope's autistic son. Since 1996, proceeds from the Terrible Towel have helped raise more than $2.5 million for the school.

=== Fight songs ===
The Steelers have no official fight song, but many fan versions of "Steelers Polka" (a parody of "Pennsylvania Polka") by ethnic singer Jimmy Pol, both originating in the 1970s, have been recorded. Since 1994, the song "Here We Go" by local singer Roger Wood has been popular among fans. Since 2002, the 1979 Styx song "Renegade" is played near the end of the third quarter or the start of the fourth quarter at the start of a defensive stand to rally the crowd, featuring a compilation of recent Steelers defensive highlights. Another song from hometown rapper Wiz Khalifa, "Black and Yellow", which is an ode to growing up in Pittsburgh, is also a standard part of the Steelers home game experience.

=== Cheerleaders ===
The Steelers were the first NFL team to have a cheerleading squad. Known as the Steelerettes, their run lasted only from 1961 to 1969. The Steelerettes were shut down due to owner Art Rooney wanting to focus more on game presentation and promote traditional values. The franchise has not had cheerleaders since the Steelerettes folded, one of seven NFL teams without them.

=== Basketball ===
During the offseason, the Steelers have long participated in charity basketball games throughout Western Pennsylvania and neighboring areas. The games usually feature six active players as well as their player-coach playing against a group of local civic leaders. The players, whose participants aren't announced until the day of the game, sign free autographs for fans during halftime.

== Facilities ==
=== Stadiums ===
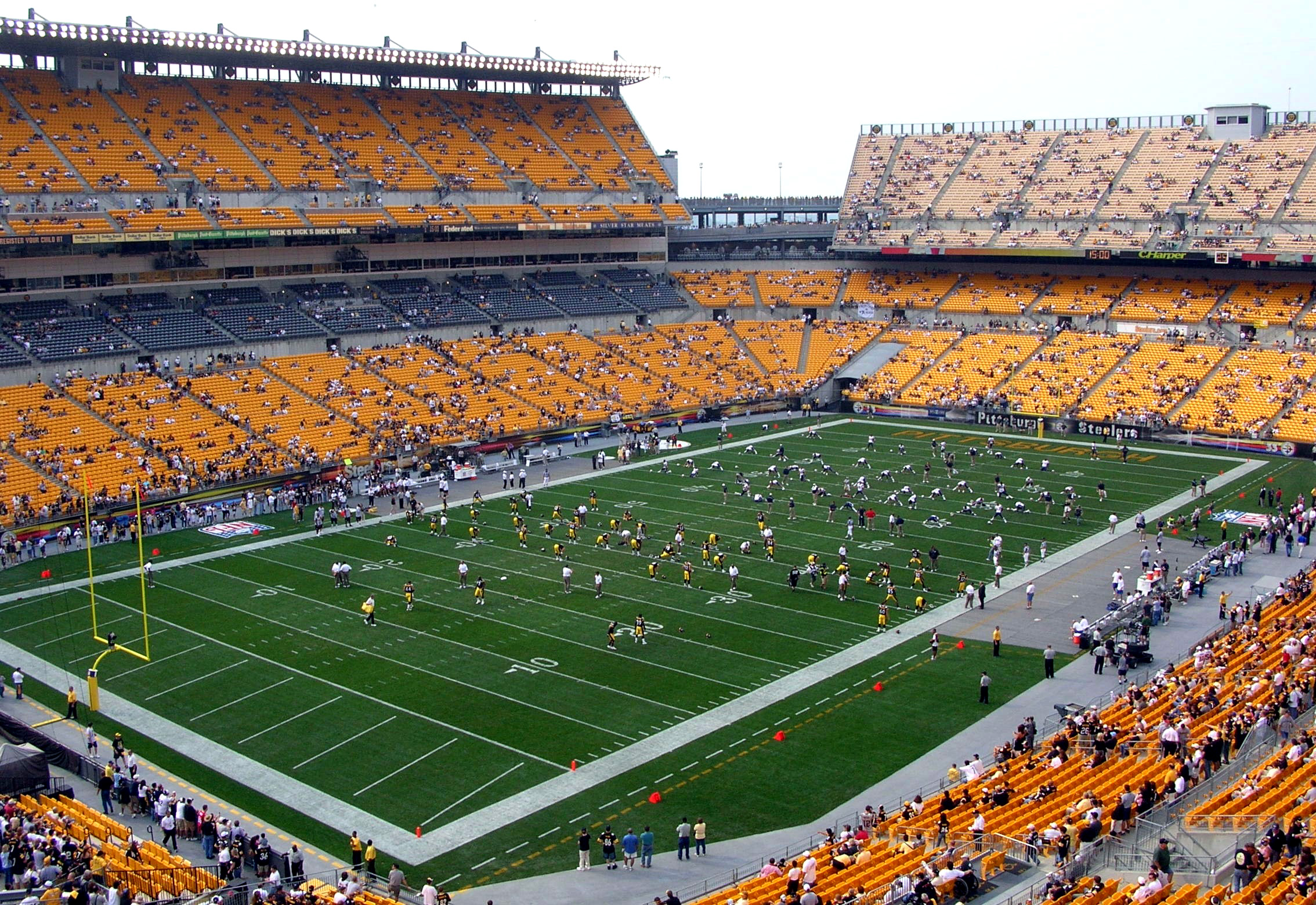
Heinz Field before a Pittsburgh Steelers-New England Patriots game, September 2005

In 2001, the Steelers moved into what is now known as Acrisure Stadium, ushering in a new era for the franchise after decades in multipurpose venues. Since their founding in 1933, the team has played in several homes across Pittsburgh. For 31 seasons, the Steelers shared Forbes Field with the Pittsburgh Pirates from 1933 to 1963, before gradually transitioning to Pitt Stadium at the University of Pittsburgh, where they played full-time from 1964 to 1969. In 1970, the Steelers relocated to Three Rivers Stadium on the city's North Shore, a multipurpose facility shared with the Pirates that became the backdrop for the franchise's dynasty of the 1970s, including four Super Bowl championships. The team remained there until the opening of Heinz Field in 2001, a football-specific stadium designed to better suit Pittsburgh's identity and game-day atmosphere. Located along the Ohio River, the stadium offers views of the Pittsburgh skyline and features an open end that often brings swirling winds into play, making kicking and passing more challenging and contributing to a distinct home-field advantage. The stadium features rows of iconic yellow seats, reflecting the Steelers' signature gold color and team identity. The venue has hosted numerous memorable moments, including multiple AFC Championship Games and iconic playoff contests during the Ben Roethlisberger era. In February 2022, after Heinz declined to sign a new deal after naming rights expired, the Steelers signed a deal with Acrisure and renamed the stadium to Acrisure Stadium.

=== Training camp ===
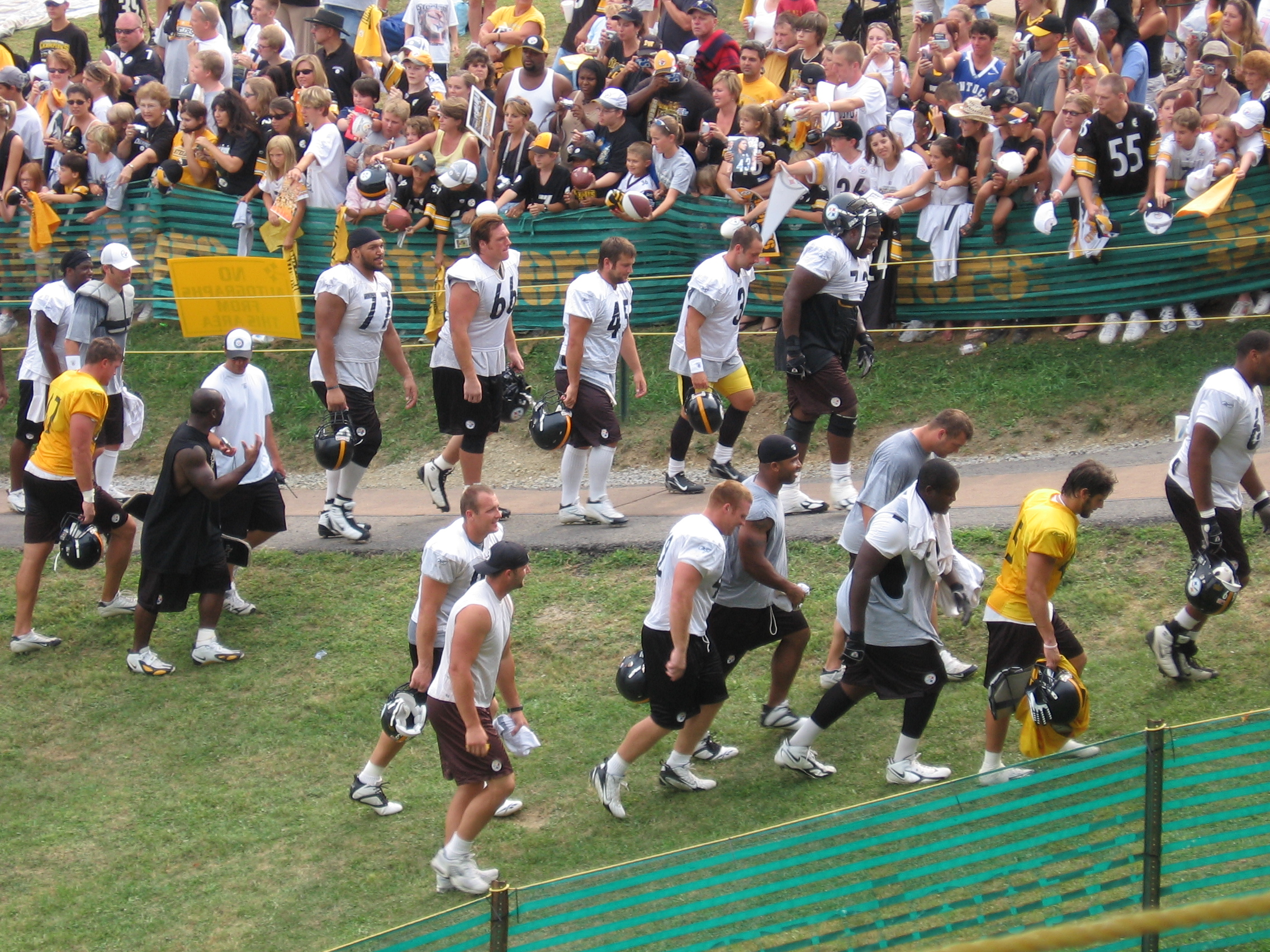
Steelers at training camp in Latrobe

The Steelers hold training camp east of the city at Saint Vincent College in Latrobe. The site is one of the most storied in the league with Peter King of SI.com describing it as: "... I love the place. It's the perfect training-camp setting, looking out over the rolling hills of the Laurel Highlands in west-central Pennsylvania, an hour east of Pittsburgh. On a misty or foggy morning, standing atop the hill at the college, you feel like you're in Scotland. Classic, wonderful slice of American culture. If you can visit one training camp, this is the one to see."

The team has its headquarters and practice facilities at the state-of-the-art University of Pittsburgh Medical Center Sportsplex on Pittsburgh's Southside. Constructed in 2000, the facility combines the vast expertise of sports medical professionals and researchers as well as hosting the University of Pittsburgh Panthers football team.

In 2020 and 2021, due to the COVID-19 pandemic, the Steelers held their training camp at Heinz Field. They returned to Saint Vincent College for the 2022 season.

=== Historical facilities ===
The Rooney family has long had a close relationship with Duquesne University in the city and from the teams founding in the 1930s to the late 1990s used Art Rooney Field and other facilities on campus as either its primary or secondary in-season training site as well as Greenlee Field during the 1930s.

In the 1970s and 1980s, the team had season scrimmages at South Park in the suburban south hills of Pittsburgh. During various seasons including the strike season of 1987, the Steelers used Point Stadium in nearby Johnstown for game week practices. During the 1950s St. Bonaventure University (where Art Rooney's brother Silas was serving as athletic director) and suburban Ligonier also served as a pre-season training camp sites.

== Players of note ==
=== Current roster ===
Pittsburgh Steelers roster
**Quarterbacks (QB)**: 16 Drew Allar; 18 Will Howard; 8 Aaron Rodgers; 2 Mason Rudolph; **Running backs (RB)**: 13 Rico Dowdle; 29 Eli Heidenreich; 21 Travis Homer; 31 Lew Nichols III; 37 Riley Nowakowski FB; 30 Jaylen Warren; **Wide receivers (WR)**: 17 Germie Bernard; 4 DK Metcalf; 15 Ben Skowronek; 10 Kaden Wetjen RS; **Tight ends (TE)**: 88 Pat Freiermuth; 85 Robert Tonyan; 80 Darnell Washington	**Offensive linemen (OL)**: 74 Spencer Anderson G; 60 Dylan Cook T; 76 Troy Fautanu T; 54 Zach Frazier C; 67 Brock Hoffman G; 71 Max Iheanachor T; 62 Ryan McCollum C; 66 Mason McCormick G; **Defensive linemen (DL)**: 95 Keeanu Benton DE; 94 Yahya Black NT; 97 Cameron Heyward DT; 92 Kevin Jobity Jr. DE; 96 Gabriel Rubio DE	**Linebackers (LB)**: 44 Carson Bruener ILB; 51 Nick Herbig OLB; 56 Alex Highsmith OLB; 55 Cole Holcomb ILB; 6 Patrick Queen ILB; 33 Jack Sawyer OLB; 90 T. J. Watt OLB; 41 Payton Wilson ILB; **Defensive backs (DB)**: 3 Jaquan Brisker S; 35 Jamel Dean CB; 26 Brandin Echols CB; 25 DeShon Elliott S; 23 Daylen Everette CB; 27 Sean Murphy-Bunting CB; 5 Jalen Ramsey CB; 22 Asante Samuel Jr. CB; 40 Doneiko Slaughter CB; 39 Terell Smith CB; 28 Robert Spears-Jennings S; **Special teams (ST)**: 9 Chris Boswell K; 19 Cameron Johnston P; 46 Christian Kuntz LS	**Practice squad**: 65 Kyler Baugh DT; 49 Sebastian Castro S; 57 KJ Henry LB; 82 Isaiah Hodgins WR; 84 Max Hurleman WR (PS/I); 89 Brandon Johnson WR; 79 Steven Jones G; 48 Marte Mapu LB; 81 Lake McRee TE; 72 Doug Nester G; 93 Esezi Otomewo DT; 50 Elandon Roberts LB; 38 Darius Rush CB; 87 Brandon Smith WR; 83 Marquez Valdes-Scantling WR; 42 Car'lin Vigers CB; 45 Julius Welschof LB (IPP); 53 Jacoby Windmon LB; **Reserve**: 68 Jack Driscoll T (IR); 73 Gennings Dunker G (IR); 99 Derrick Harmon DT (IR); 69 Sebastian Joseph-Day DT (IR); 34 Donte Kent CB (PUP); 91 Logan Lee DT (IR); 11 Michael Pittman Jr. WR (IR); 14 Roman Wilson WR (IR) 52 active, 16 practice squad (2 IPP), 9 reserve As of October 24, 2026. Rookies in italics.; Roster; Depth chart; Transactions

=== Retired uniform numbers ===
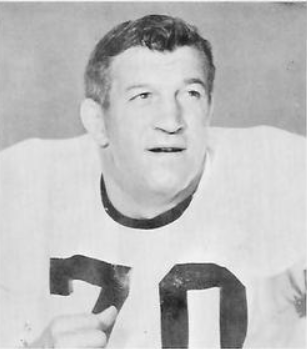
Ernie Stautner was the first player in Steelers history to have his number retired

Pittsburgh Steelers retired numbers
No.	Player	Position	Seasons	Retired	Ref.
**32**	Franco Harris	FB	1972–1983	December 24, 2022	
**70**	Ernie Stautner	DT	1950–1963	October 25, 1964	
**75**	Joe Greene	DT	1969–1981	November 2, 2014	

The Steelers retired Stautner's #70 in 1964 before creating a 50-year tradition of not retiring numbers. The team retired Greene's #75 in 2014 and left the possibility open that they would retire other players' jersey numbers at later dates. However, several numbers have not been reissued since the retirement of the players who wore them, including:

- **1** Gary Anderson
- **7** Ben Roethlisberger
- **12** Terry Bradshaw
- **36** Jerome Bettis
- **43** Troy Polamalu
- **47** Mel Blount
- **52** Mike Webster
- **58** Jack Lambert
- **59** Jack Ham
- **63** Dermontti Dawson
- **86** Hines Ward

Numbers 1 (by Anthony Wright in the 1999 preseason), 47 (by five players from 1985 through 2006), and 59 (by Todd Seabaugh in 1984) were issued for a time before being taken out of circulation. Number 31 was initially taken out of circulation in honor of Donnie Shell, but was reissued with Shell's blessing in 2001 to Mike Logan, who grew up in suburban McKeesport and had idolized Shell when he was younger. After Logan retired in 2006, 31 returned to regular circulation, likely due to 36 being removed for Bettis as well as 47 being removed due to some controversy involving the number being issued multiple times following Blount's retirement. Notably, numbers 80 (Jack Butler), 82 (John Stallworth), 83 (Louis Lipps & Heath Miller), 84 (Antonio Brown), and 88 (Lynn Swann) remain in circulation despite the NFL relaxing uniform numbering rules and more numbers being available for receivers.

=== Pro Football Hall of Famers ===
==== "Primary" inductees ====
The Steelers boast the third most "primary" inductees into the Pro Football Hall of Fame, i.e. inductees that spent most or all of their NFL careers in Pittsburgh. They also can claim the most honorees of any franchise founded on or after 1933 and the only franchise with three members of ownership in the Hall of Fame.

Pittsburgh Steelers Hall of Famers
Players
No.	Name	Inducted	Position(s)	Years w/ Steelers	Ref.
36	Jerome Bettis	2015	RB	1996–2005	
47	Mel Blount	1989	CB	1970–1983	
12	Terry Bradshaw	1989	QB	1970–1983	
80	Jack Butler	2012	CB	1951–1959	
63	Dermontti Dawson	2012	C	1988–2000	
35	Bill Dudley	1966	RB	1942, 1945–1946	
66	Alan Faneca	2021	G	1998–2007	
75	Joe Greene	1987	DT	1969–1981	
59	Jack Ham	1988	OLB	1971–1982	
32	Franco Harris	1990	FB	1972–1983	
35	John Henry Johnson	1987	FB	1960–1965	
35	Walt Kiesling	1966	G	1937–1944	
58	Jack Lambert	1990	OLB	1974–1984	
43	Troy Polamalu	2020	SS	2003–2014	
31	Donnie Shell	2020	S	1974–1987	
82	John Stallworth	2002	WR	1974–1987	
70	Ernie Stautner	1969	DT	1950–1963	
88	Lynn Swann	2001	WR	1974–1982	
52	Mike Webster	1997	C	1974–1988	
26	Rod Woodson	2009	CB	1987–1996	
91	Kevin Greene	2016	OLB	1993–1995	
Coaches and Contributors
Name		Inducted	Position(s)	Years w/ Steelers	Ref.
**Bill Cowher**		2020	Head coach	1992–2006	
**Chuck Noll**		1993	Head coach	1969–1991	
**Bill Nunn**		2021	Scout; Assistant Director Player Personnel; Senior Scout	1968–2014	
**Art Rooney**		1964	Founder, Owner	1933–1988	
**Dan Rooney**		2000	Executive, Owner	1975–2017	

==== Steelers in the Hall for contributions elsewhere ====
Steelers in the Hall for contributions elsewhere
Players
No.	Name	Inducted	Steeler Position(s)	Years w/ Steelers	Primary Team	Impact Position(s)	Ref.
36	Cal Hubbard	1963	OT	1936	Green Bay Packers	OT	
15	Johnny Blood	1963	FB; Head coach	1934, 1937–1939	Green Bay Packers	FB	
22	Bobby Layne	1967	QB/K	1958–1962	Detroit Lions	QB/K	
36	Marion Motley	1968	FB	1955	Cleveland Browns	FB	
14	Johnny Unitas	1979	QB	1955	Baltimore Colts	QB	
16	Len Dawson	1987	QB	1957–1959	Kansas City Chiefs	QB	
7	Jim Finks	1995	QB	1949–1955	Minnesota Vikings	GM	
21	Tony Dungy	2016	S Defensive backs coach Defensive coordinator	1977–1978; 1981–1988	Indianapolis Colts	Head coach	
Bert Bell		1963	Co-owner; Head coach	1941–1946	National Football League	Commissioner	
Mike Munchak		2001	Offensive line coach	2014–2018	Houston Oilers	G	
Russ Grimm		2010	Offensive line coach	2001–2006	Washington Redskins	G	
Dick LeBeau		2010	Defensive coordinator	1992–1996; 2004–2014	Detroit Lions	CB	

===== Misc. Award recipients =====
- Rocky Bleier, former Steeler running back received the Purple Heart, Bronze Star and the Combat Infantryman Badge while serving in the Army in Vietnam.
- Pat Livingston, Steelers beat writer for the Pittsburgh Press, awarded the 1979 Dick McCann Memorial Award
- Vito Stellino, Steelers beat writer in the 1970s for the Pittsburgh Post-Gazette, awarded the 1989 Dick McCann Memorial Award
- Myron Cope, Announcer (1970–2005), awarded the 2005 Pro Football Hall of Fame's Pete Rozelle Radio-Television Award
- John Clayton, Steelers beat writer for the Pittsburgh Press (1976–1986), awarded the 2007 Dick McCann Memorial Award

=== Pro Bowl players ===
The following Steelers players have been named to the Pro Bowl:

- **QB** Ben Roethlisberger (6), Terry Bradshaw (3), Bobby Layne (2), Earl Morrall, Jim Finks, Kordell Stewart, Neil O'Donnell, Russell Wilson
- **FB** Franco Harris (9), John Henry Johnson (3), Dick Riffle, Earnest Jackson, Fran Rogel, John Karcis, Roosevelt Nix, Stu Smith
- **HB** Jerome Bettis (4), Le'Veon Bell (3), Barry Foster (2), Joe Geri (2), Lynn Chandnois (2), Ray Mathews (2), Tom Tracy (2), Willie Parker (2), Bill Dudley, Clendon Thomas, Dick Hoak, James Conner, Johnny Lattner, Merl Condit, Najee Harris, Whizzer White
- **LT** Alejandro Villanueva (2), Charlie Bradshaw (2), Joe Coomer, Marvel Smith
- **LG** Alan Faneca (7), Byron Gentry (2), Duval Love, Isaac Seumalo, Mike Sandusky
- **C** Maurkice Pouncey (9), Mike Webster (9), Dermontti Dawson (7), Bill Walsh (2), Chuck Cherundolo (2), Jeff Hartings (2), Buzz Nutter, Mike Basrak
- **RG** David DeCastro (6), John Nisby (2), Bruce Van Dyke, Carlton Haselrig, Milt Simington
- **RT** Frank Varrichione (4), George Hughes (2), Tunch Ilkin (2), John Woudenberg, Larry Brown
- **TE** Elbie Nickel (3), Heath Miller (2), Eric Green (2), Jack McClairen, Preston Carpenter
- **WR** Antonio Brown (6), Hines Ward (4), John Stallworth (4), Lynn Swann (3), Buddy Dial (2), Gary Ballman (2), Louis Lipps (2), Roy Jefferson (2), Yancey Thigpen (2), Diontae Johnson, Jimmy Orr, JuJu Smith-Schuster, Mike Wallace, Ron Shanklin
- **DE** L. C. Greenwood (6), Bill McPeak (3), Ben McGee (2), Dwight White (2), Lou Michaels (2), Aaron Smith, Brett Keisel, Cameron Heyward
- **DT** Joe Greene (10), Ernie Stautner (9), Cameron Heyward (6), Casey Hampton (5), Gene Lipscomb, Joe Krupa, Joel Steed
- **LB** Jack Lambert (9), Jack Ham (8), T. J. Watt (8), Andy Russell (7), James Harrison (5), Greg Lloyd (5), Dale Dodrill (4), Jason Gildon (3), Jerry Shipkey (3), Joey Porter (3), Mike Merriweather (3), Myron Pottios (3), John Reger (3), Chad Brown, James Farrior (2), Kevin Greene (2), Levon Kirkland (2), Ryan Shazier (2), David Little, Kendrell Bell, LaMarr Woodley, Lawrence Timmons, Marv Matuszak, Patrick Queen, Robin Cole
- **CB** Rod Woodson (7), Mel Blount (5), Jack Butler (4), Art Jones, Brady Keys, Dean Derby, J. T. Thomas, Joe Haden, Marv Woodson
- **SS** Troy Polamalu (8), Donnie Shell (5), Carnell Lake (4), Mike Wagner (2)
- **FS** Minkah Fitzpatrick (5), Glen Edwards (2), Jalen Ramsey, Ryan Clark
- **K** Gary Anderson (3), Chris Boswell (2), Roy Gerela (2), Mike Clark
- **P** Bobby Walden
- **RS** Antonio Brown, Rod Woodson
- **ST** Miles Killebrew (2), Ben Skowronek

=== NFL MVPs ===
NFL MVP Winners
Season	Player	Position
1946	Bill Dudley	HB
1978	Terry Bradshaw	QB

=== Defensive Player of the Year Awards winners ===
NFL Defensive Player of the Year
Season	Player	Position
1972	Joe Greene	DT
1974	Joe Greene	DT
1975	Mel Blount	CB
1976	Jack Lambert	LB
1993	Rod Woodson	CB
2008	James Harrison	OLB
2010	Troy Polamalu	SS
2021	T. J. Watt	OLB

=== Rookie of the Year Award winners ===
NFL Offensive Rookie of the Year
Season	Player	Position
1972	Franco Harris	RB
1984	Louis Lipps	WR
2004	Ben Roethlisberger	QB

NFL Defensive Rookie of the Year
Season	Player	Position
1969	Joe Greene	DT
1974	Jack Lambert	MLB
2001	Kendrell Bell	OLB

=== Super Bowl MVPs ===
Super Bowl MVP winners
Super Bowl	Player	Position
IX	Franco Harris	FB
X	Lynn Swann	WR
XIII	Terry Bradshaw	QB
XIV	Terry Bradshaw	QB
XL	Hines Ward	WR
XLIII	Santonio Holmes	WR

=== NFL All-Decade Teams ===
The following Steelers were named to NFL All-Decade Teams (and 75th and 100th Anniversary All-Time Teams, selected in 1994 and 2019, respectively). Only those who spent time with Pittsburgh during the respective decades are listed. Bold indicates those elected to the Pro Football Hall of Fame.

NFL 1930s All-Decade Team
No.	Player	Position	Tenure
15	**Johnny Blood**	HB	1934, 1937–38

NFL 1940s All-Decade Team
No.	Player	Position	Tenure
35	**Bill Dudley**	HB	1942, 1945–46
76	Bucko Kilroy	OT	1943
79	Vic Sears	OT	1943
70	Al Wistert	OT	1943

NFL 1950s All-Decade Team
No.	Player	Position	Tenure
22	**Bobby Layne**	QB	1958–62
70	**Ernie Stautner**	DT	1950–63
80	**Jack Butler**	CB	1951–59

NFL 1960s All-Decade Team
No.	Player	Position	Tenure
No players selected

NFL 1970s All-Decade Team
No.	Player	Position	Tenure
12	**Terry Bradshaw**	QB	1970–83
32	**Franco Harris**	FB	1972–83
88	**Lynn Swann**	WR	1974–82
52	**Mike Webster**	C	1974–88
68	L. C. Greenwood	DE	1969–81
75	**Joe Greene**	DT	1969–81
58	**Jack Lambert**	MLB	1974–84
59	**Jack Ham**	OLB	1971–82
**Chuck Noll**		Coach	1969–91

NFL 1980s All-Decade Team
No.	Player	Position	Tenure
52	**Mike Webster**	C	1974–88
58	**Jack Lambert**	MLB	1974–84
47	**Mel Blount**	CB	1970–83
1	Gary Anderson	K	1982–94
**Chuck Noll**		Coach	1969–91

NFL 75th Anniversary All-Time Team
No.	Player	Position	Tenure
14	Johnny Unitas	QB	1955
36	Marion Motley	FB	1955
52	Mike Webster	C	1974–88
75	Joe Greene	DT	1969–81
58	Jack Lambert	LB	1974–84
59	Jack Ham	LB	1971–82
47	Mel Blount	CB	1970–83
26	Rod Woodson	CB	1987–96

NFL 1990s All-Decade Team
No.	Player	Position	Tenure
63	**Dermontti Dawson**	C	1988–2000
91	**Kevin Greene**	OLB	1993–95
54	Hardy Nickerson	ILB	1987–92
99	Levon Kirkland	ILB	1992–2000
26	**Rod Woodson**	CB	1987–96
37	Carnell Lake	S	1989–98
1	Gary Anderson	K	1982–94

NFL 2000s All-Decade Team
No.	Player	Position	Tenure
66	**Alan Faneca**	G	1998–2007
55	Joey Porter	OLB	1999–2006
43	**Troy Polamalu**	S	2003–14

NFL 100th Anniversary All-Time Team
No.	Player	Position	Tenure
14	Johnny Unitas	QB	1955
36	Marion Motley	FB	1955
52	Mike Webster	C	1974–88
36	Cal Hubbard	OT	1936
75	Joe Greene	DT	1969–81
58	Jack Lambert	MLB	1974–84
59	Jack Ham	OLB	1971–82
47	Mel Blount	CB	1970–83
26	Rod Woodson	CB	1987–96
**Chuck Noll**		Coach	1969–91

NFL 2010s All-Decade Team
No.	Player	Position	Tenure
84	Antonio Brown	WR	2010–18
53	Maurkice Pouncey	C	2010–20

=== All-time team ===
In 2007, in celebration of the franchise's 75th season, the team announced an updated All-Time team of the 33 best players who have ever played for the Steelers. This team supplanted the previous All-Time team of 24 players named as part of the 50th anniversary commemoration in 1982.

A "Legends team" consisting of the club's best pre-1970s players was released concurrently with the latest All-Time team.

=== Dapper Dan Sportsman of the Year ===
The regional Dapper Dan Charities has since 1939 named the "Sportsman of the Year" in the Pittsburgh region. 19 Steelers have won the award in 23 events:

- 1941 Aldo Donelli
- 1942 Bill Dudley
- 1946 Bill Dudley
- 1950 Joe Geri
- 1952 Red Dawson
- 1955 John Michelosen
- 1962 Lou Michaels & John Michelosen
- 1968 Dick Hoak
- 1972 Chuck Noll
- 1974 Joe Greene
- 1975 Terry Bradshaw
- 1977 Franco Harris
- 1984 John Stallworth
- 1985 Louis Lipps
- 1992 Bill Cowher
- 1994 Bill Cowher
- 1997 Jerome Bettis
- 2001 Kordell Stewart
- 2004 Ben Roethlisberger
- 2006 Jerome Bettis
- 2008 Mike Tomlin
- 2014 Antonio Brown
- 2015 Antonio Brown
- 2018 James Conner
- 2020 Cameron Heyward

== Hall of Honor ==
The Pittsburgh Steelers Hall of Honor was established on August 1, 2017. There have been 63 inductees.

Elected to the Pro Football Hall of Fame

Pittsburgh Steelers Hall of Honor
N°	Name	Position	Years With Club	Inducted
36	Jerome Bettis	RB	1996–2005	2017
20	Rocky Bleier	RB	1968, 1970–80	2018
47	Mel Blount	CB	1970–83	2017
12	Terry Bradshaw	QB	1970–83	2017
87; 79	Larry Brown	TE; T	1971–76; 1977–84	2019
80	Jack Butler	CB	1951–59	2017
—	Kevin Colbert	General Manager	2000–2022	2026
—	Myron Cope	Broadcaster	1970–2004	2022
—	Bill Cowher	Coach	1992–2006	2019
57	Sam Davis	G	1967–79	2022
63	Dermontti Dawson	C	1988–2000	2017
84	Buddy Dial	WR	1959–63	2018
35	Bill Dudley	HB	1942, 1945–46	2017
66	Alan Faneca	G	1998–2007	2018
51	James Farrior	ILB	2002–11	2020
92	Jason Gildon	OLB	1994–2003	2024
75	Joe Greene	DT	1969–81	2017
91	Kevin Greene	LB	1993–95	2017
68	L. C. Greenwood	DE	1969–81	2017
59	Jack Ham	MLB	1971–82	2017
98	Casey Hampton	NT	2001–12	2024
32	Franco Harris	FB	1972–83	2017
92	James Harrison	OLB	2002–03, 2004–12, 2014–17	2023
42	Dick Hoak	RB; Running backs coach	1961–70; 1972–2006	2017
62	Tunch Ilkin	OT; Broadcaster	1980–92, 1998–2020	2021
35	John Henry Johnson	FB	1960–65	2017
35	Walt Kiesling	G Coach	1937–39; 1939–44, 1954–56	2017
55	Jon Kolb	OT	1969–81	2021
37	Carnell Lake	S CB	1989–98	2021
58	Jack Lambert	LB	1974–84	2017
22	Bobby Layne	QB	1958–62	2017
—	Dick LeBeau	Defensive backs coach Defensive coordinator	1992–94; 1995–96, 2004–14	2024
83	Louis Lipps	WR	1984–91	2021
95	Greg Lloyd	LB	1988–97	2020
56	Ray Mansfield	C	1964–76	2023
25	Ray Mathews	HB; E	1951–59	2022
15	Johnny "Blood" McNally	FB; Coach	1934, 1937–39; 1937–39	2017
83	Heath Miller	TE	2005–15	2022
72	Gerry Mullins	G	1971–79	2023
81	Elbie Nickel	TE	1947–57	2019
—	Chuck Noll	Coach	1969–91	2017
—	Bill Nunn	Scout; Assistant Director Player Personnel; Senior Scout	1968–2014	2018
39	Willie Parker	RB	2004–09	2024
43	Troy Polamalu	S	2003–14	2020
55	Joey Porter	OLB	1999–2006	2025
53	Maurkice Pouncey	C	2010–20	2025
7	Ben Roethlisberger	QB	2004–21	2025
—	Art Rooney, Jr.	Personnel Director; Vice President	1965–86; 1987–present	2018
—	Art Rooney, Sr.	Founder; President; Chairman of the Board	1933–88	2017
—	Dan Rooney, Sr.	President; Chairman	1955–2017	2017
34	Andy Russell	LB	1963, 1966–76	2017
31	Donnie Shell	S	1974–87	2017
91	Aaron Smith	DE	1999–2011	2023
82	John Stallworth	WR	1974–87	2017
70	Ernie Stautner	DT	1950–63	2017
88	Lynn Swann	WR	1974–82	2017
24	J. T. Thomas	CB	1973–81	2026
23	Mike Wagner	S	1971–80	2020
86	Hines Ward	WR	1998–2011	2019
52	Mike Webster	C	1974–88	2017
78	Dwight White	DE	1971–80	2020
73	Craig Wolfley	G/T	1980–89	2026
26	Rod Woodson	CB	1987–96	2017

== Coaches ==
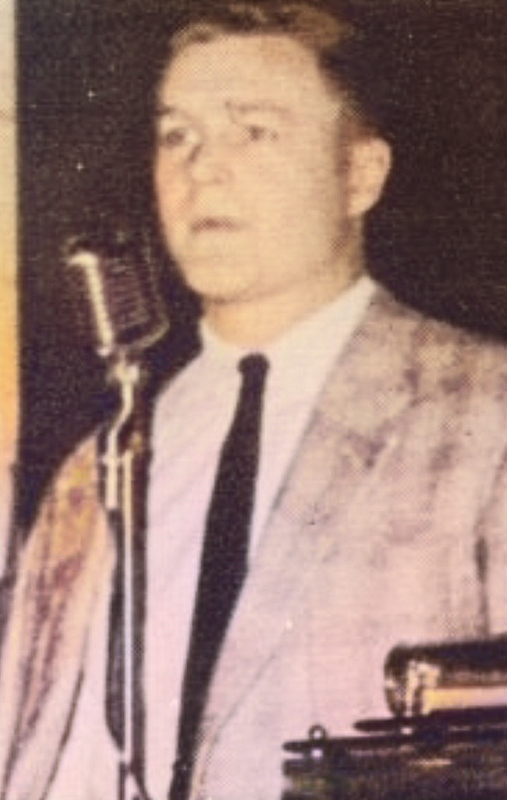
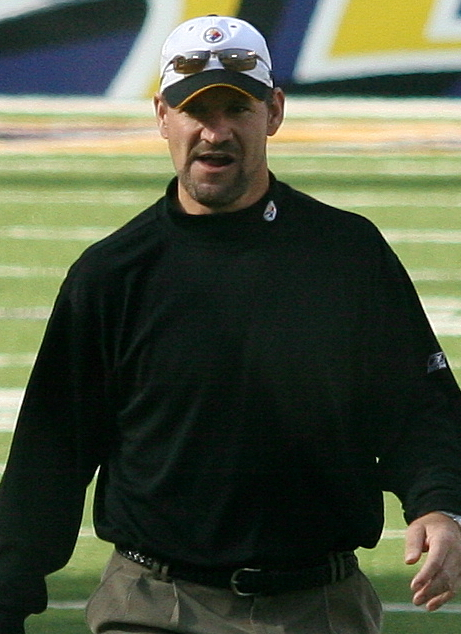
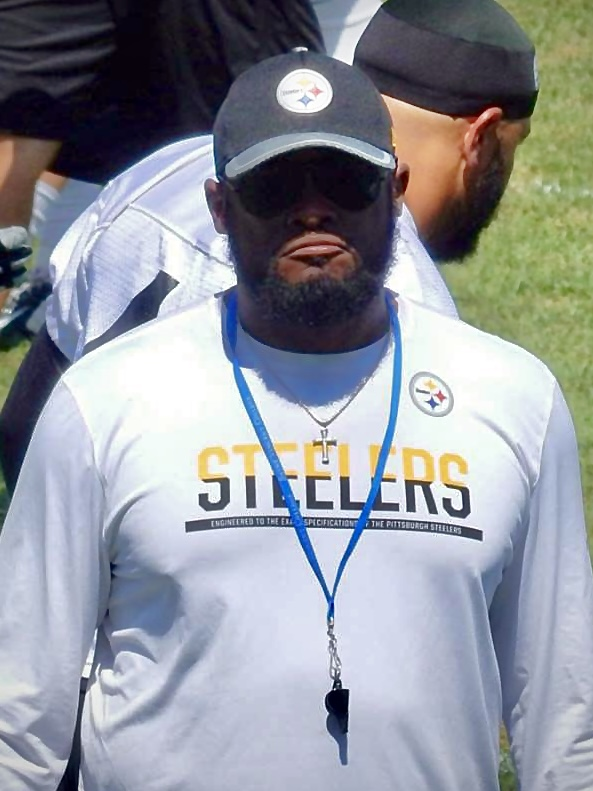
From left to right: Noll, Cowher, and Tomlin combined for a 571–381–4 (.597) record from 1969 to 2025, winning a total of six Super Bowls.

The Steelers have had 17 coaches through their history. They have cycled through the fewest head coaches in the modern NFL history. Their first coach was Forrest Douds, who coached them to a 3–6–2 record in 1933. Chuck Noll had the longest term as head coach with the Steelers; he is one of only four coaches to coach a single NFL team for 23 years. Noll is widely credited with building the franchise's dynasty of the 1970s, winning four Super Bowls and leading the team with 209 all-time victories. Since Noll's hiring in 1969, the Steelers have had remarkable continuity at the position, employing only four head coaches: Noll, Bill Cowher (1992–2006), Mike Tomlin (2007–2025), and Mike McCarthy, who was hired prior to the 2026 season. Both Cowher and Tomlin continued the team's tradition of success, each leading the Steelers to a Super Bowl victory during their respective tenures.

=== Current staff ===
Pittsburgh Steelers staff
Front office: Owner/president – Art Rooney II; Vice president – Art Rooney Jr.; Vice president of player personnel – Dan Rooney Jr.; General manager – Omar Khan; Assistant general manager – Andy Weidl; Director of player scouting – Mark Sadowski; Director of pro personnel – Max Gruder; Senior director of college personnel - Tim Gribble; Director of college scouting – Dan Colbert; Senior personnel executive – Sheldon White; Senior personnel assistant – Quentin Harris; Senior director of football strategy and administration – Cole Marcoux; Director of player development – Darrel Young; Football analytics coordinator – Tosin Kazeem; Head coaches: Head coach – Mike McCarthy; Assistant head coach/secondary – Joe Whitt Jr.; Offensive coaches: Offensive coordinator – Brian Angelichio; Quarterbacks – Tom Arth; Running backs – Ramon Chinyoung Sr.; Wide receivers – Adam Henry; Tight ends – Robert Kugler; Offensive line – James Campen; Assistant offensive line – Jahri Evans; Game management/quarterbacks – Tim Berbenich; Senior offensive assistant – Frank Cignetti Jr.; Offensive quality control – Eric Simonelli	Defensive coaches: Defensive coordinator – Patrick Graham; Defensive line – Domata Peko; Outside linebackers – C. J. Ah You; Inside linebackers – Scott McCurley; Defensive pass game coordinator/defensive backs – Jason Simmons; Defensive assistant – Shawn Howe; Defensive assistant – Pat Reilly; Special teams coaches: Special teams coordinator – Danny Crossman; Support staff: Chief of staff – Steve Scarnecchia; Strength and conditioning: Head strength and conditioning – Mark Lovat; Assistant strength and conditioning – Justus Galac; Assistant strength and conditioning – Abe Munayer; Director of performance integration and sports science – Grant Thorne; → Coaching staff → Front office → More NFL staffs

=== Offensive coordinator history ===
Years	Name
2026–present	Brian Angelichio
2024–2025	Arthur Smith
2023	Eddie Faulkner (interim)
2021–2023	Matt Canada
2018–2020	Randy Fichtner
2012–2017	Todd Haley
2007–2011	Bruce Arians
2004–2006	Ken Whisenhunt
2001–2003	Mike Mularkey
1999–2000	Kevin Gilbride
1998	Ray Sherman
1996–1997	Chan Gailey
1992–1995	Ron Erhardt
1990–1991	Joe Walton
1983–1989	Tom Moore

=== Defensive coordinator history ===
Years	Name
2026–present	Patrick Graham
2022–2025	Teryl Austin
2015–2021	Keith Butler
2004–2014; 1995–1996	Dick LeBeau
2000–2003	Tim Lewis
1997–1999	Jim Haslett
1992–1994	Dom Capers
1990–1991	Dave Brazil
1989	Rod Rust
1984–1988	Tony Dungy
1979–1983	Woody Widenhofer
1978	George Perles
1973–1977	Bud Carson

== Media ==
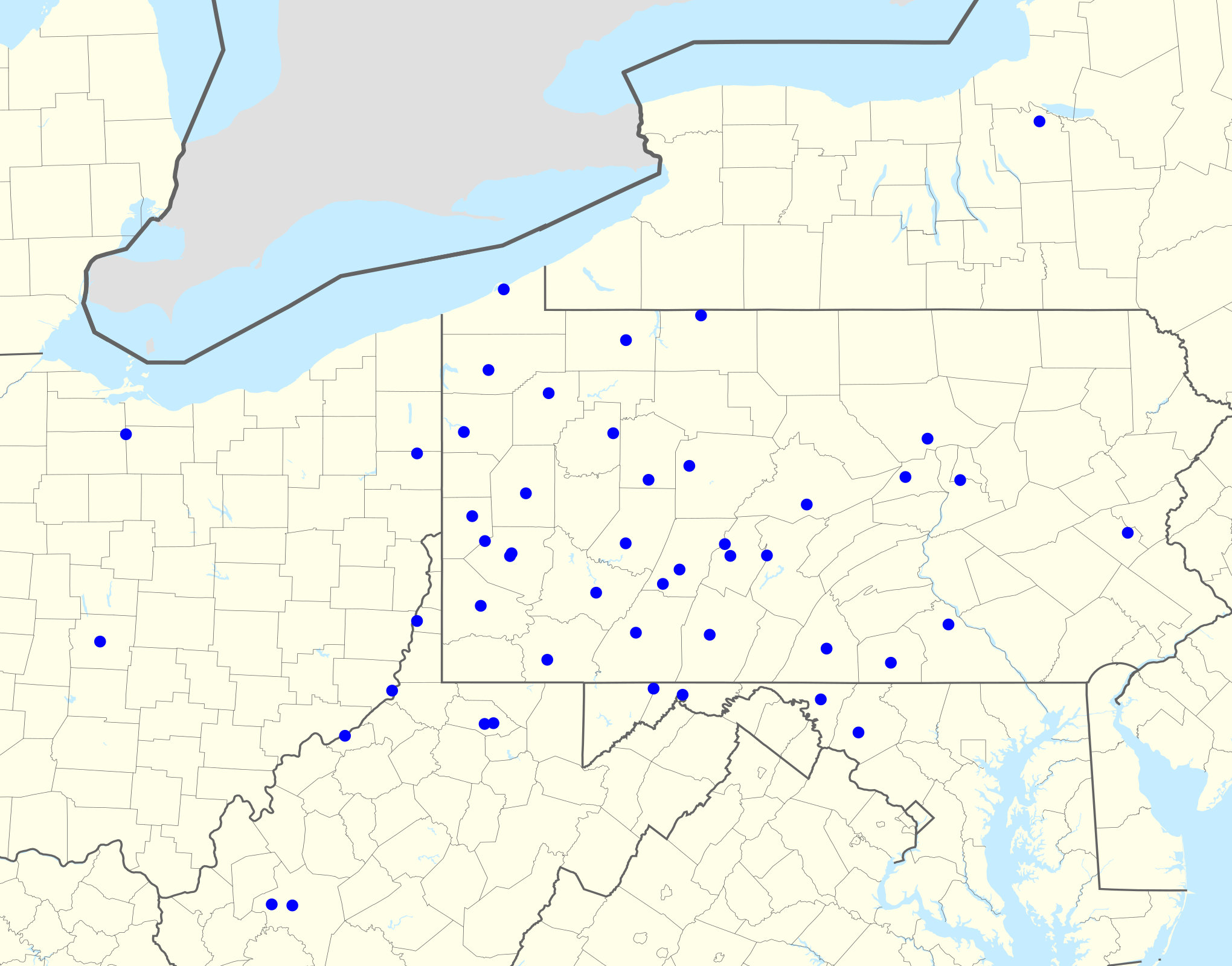
Map of radio affiliates.

The Steelers' flagship radio stations are WDVE 102.5 FM and WBGG 970 AM. Both stations are owned by iHeartMedia. Games are also available on 51 radio stations in Pennsylvania, Western Maryland, Ohio, and Northern West Virginia. The announcers are Rob King and Max Starks. Missi Matthews is the sideline reporter. Myron Cope, the longtime color analyst and inventor of the "Terrible Towel", retired after the 2004 season after broadcasting games since 1970, and died in 2008. Longtime lead announcer Bill Hillgrove retired after the 2023 season, having served as the play-by-play announcer since 1994. Color commentator Tunch Ilkin joined Hillgrove in the booth from 1998 to 2020. Ilkin's friend and former teammate Craig Wolfley was the sideline reporter from 2002 to 2020 and was the color commentator from 2021 to 2024.

Preseason games not shown on one of the national broadcasters are seen on CBS O&O KDKA-TV, channel 2; independent sister station WPKD-TV, channel 19; and AT&T SportsNet Pittsburgh. KDKA-TV's Bob Pompeani and former Steelers quarterback Charlie Batch do the announcing for the pre-season games, as well as the two hosting the pre-game program Steelers Kickoff during the regular season prior to the national airing of The NFL Today. Pompeani and former Steelers lineman Chris Hoke also host the Xfinity Xtra Point following the game on days when CBS does not have that week's NFL doubleheader. When CBS has a week's doubleheader, the show airs on WPKD-TV. Coach Mike McCarthy's weekly press conference is shown live on AT&T SportsNet Pittsburgh. Both Batch and Hoke replaced former Steelers lineman Edmund Nelson, who retired from broadcasting in 2015.

Thursday Night Football broadcasts are shown locally on Fox affiliate WPGH-TV, channel 53 (along with home games with NFC opponents and some flexed interconference games), while ESPN Monday Night Football broadcasts are shown locally on WTAE-TV, channel 4. (WTAE-TV is owned by the Hearst Corporation, which owns a 20% stake in ESPN.) By virtue of being members of the AFC, most of the Steelers' games air on CBS and KDKA. NBC Sunday Night Football games are carried by WPXI, channel 11, in the market.

The Steelers hold a national contract with Grupo Imagen for radio rights to their games in Mexico; Imagen broadcasts the Steelers on their stations in 17 Mexican cities.

=== Figures with broadcasting résumés ===
The Steelers franchise has a rich history of producing well-known sportscasters over the years. The most famous of these is probably Myron Cope, who served as a Steelers radio color commentator for 35 seasons (1970–2004).

Several former Steelers players have gone on to careers in media after completing their playing careers.

=== Newspaper ===
The Steelers Digest is the only official newspaper for the Pittsburgh Steelers. It has been published for 22 years and is currently published by Dolphin/Curtis Publishing in Miami, Florida, which also handles several other publications. The newspaper is very widely acknowledged by Steelers fans. Issues are mailed out to paying subscribers weekly through the season after every regular-season game and continue through playoffs as long as the Steelers do. After a Super Bowl victory, a bonus issue is published, which is followed by a draft preview, draft recap, and training camp edition every other month, then leading into the pre-season. There are typically 24 issues of the paper within a publishing year. The newspaper is listed on the official Steelers.com page.

=== Usage in popular culture ===
The Steelers' success over several decades has permeated film and literature. The Steelers are portrayed in the following big-budget Hollywood films:

- The January 11, 1975, episode of the Mary Tyler Moore Show featured Super Bowl IX (featuring the Steelers) as a plot device.
- Black Sunday in 1977
- Heaven Can Wait in 1978
- Smokey and the Bandit II in 1980
- Fighting Back in 1980
- Hey Kid, Catch! in 1980
- ...All the Marbles in 1981
- Evening Shade (TV series) 1990–1994
- The Waterboy cameo by Bill Cowher in 1998
- The Longest Yard in 2005
- The Chief a theater production.
- Black and Yellow in 2010.
- The Dark Knight Rises in 2012 features several Steelers players as the fictional Gotham Rogues, which was filmed in Heinz Field
- Mad Men's April 14, 2013, episode has Don Draper, Pete Campbell and Roger Sterling meeting with two HJ Heinz executives. The executives are told that not only would the ad firm have given them tickets to the Steelers' November 19, 1967, game at the Giants, the firm would have worked it so that the Steelers would have won (they lost 20–28).
- Concussion in 2015 features players from the team suffering from CTE.

The protagonist of John Grisham's novel The Associate is a staunch Steelers fan.

In the summer of 2019, the Kennywood theme park located near Pittsburgh, opened a new land themed to the Pittsburgh Steelers, Steelers Country, featuring a major record-breaking coaster, the Steel Curtain. The land, in addition to this ride, features a Steelers-themed experience, and an 'End Zone Restaurant'.

== The Chuck Noll Foundation for Brain Injury Research ==
The Steelers helped launch the Chuck Noll Foundation for Brain Injury Research in November 2016 by donating $1 million. The Foundation, started by Steelers president Art Rooney II, focuses on education and research regarding brain injuries and sports-related concussions.

In June 2017, the Steelers announced an inaugural charity walk to raise money for the foundation.

== See also ==
- Active NFL playoff appearance streaks

== Notes ==
Preceded by Miami Dolphins	Super Bowl champions 1974 (IX), 1975 (X)	Succeeded by Oakland Raiders
Preceded by Dallas Cowboys	Super Bowl champions 1978 (XIII), 1979 (XIV)	Succeeded by Oakland Raiders
Preceded by New England Patriots	Super Bowl champions 2005 (XL)	Succeeded by Indianapolis Colts
Preceded by New York Giants	Super Bowl champions 2008 (XLIII)	Succeeded by New Orleans Saints
