= 1984 Pittsburgh Steelers season =

NFL team season

- Owner: Art Rooney
- General manager: Dick Haley
- Head coach: Chuck Noll
- Offensive coordinator: Tom Moore
- Defensive coordinator: Tony Dungy
- Home stadium: Three Rivers Stadium

Results
- Record: 9–7
- Division place: 1st AFC Central
- Playoffs: Won Divisional Playoffs (at Broncos) 24–17; Lost AFC Championship (at Dolphins) 28–45
- All-Pros: Louis Lipps (2nd team)
- Pro Bowlers: LB Robin Cole; WR Louis Lipps; LB Mike Merriweather; WR John Stallworth; C Mike Webster
- Team MVP: John Stallworth
- Team ROY: Louis Lipps

The 1984 Pittsburgh Steelers season was the franchise's 52nd season as a professional sports franchise and as a member of the National Football League. This was the first time since 1969 Terry Bradshaw was not on the opening day roster.

Most of the stars from the 1970s had departed, but the Steelers showed signs of their past glory by amassing a 9–7 record to capture the AFC Central Title again. The highlight of the season was an October 14 win over the 49ers in San Francisco, the only loss the eventual Super Bowl champion 49ers suffered all season. Also serving up highlights that season was WR Louis Lipps, who won the Offensive Rookie of the Year. In the playoffs, the Steelers stunned the Broncos 24–17 in Denver to earn a trip to the AFC Championship. However, the Steelers' season would end with a 45–28 thrashing at the hands of the Dolphins in Miami. This season was the last time the Steelers appeared in a playoff game until 1989, marking the end of the powerhouse Steel Curtain defense.

== Offseason ==
=== Draft ===
1984 Pittsburgh Steelers draft
Round	Pick	Player	Position	College	Notes
1	23	Louis Lipps *	Wide receiver	Southern Miss	
2	52	Chris Kolodziejski	Tight end	Wyoming	
4	108	Weegie Thompson	Wide receiver	Florida State	
4	111	Terry Long	Guard	East Carolina	
5	135	Van Hughes	Defensive end	Southwest Texas State	
6	164	Chris Brown	Cornerback	Notre Dame	
7	191	Scott Campbell	Quarterback	Purdue	
8	220	Randy Rasmussen	Center	Minnesota	
9	247	Rich Erenberg	Running back	Colgate	
10	276	Kirk McJunkin	Tackle	Texas	
11	303	Elton Veals	Running back	Tulane	
12	332	Scoop Gillespie	Running back	William Jewell	
Made roster * Made at least one Pro Bowl during career

=== Undrafted free agents ===
1984 Undrafted free agents of note
Player	Position	College
Carky Alexander	Linebacker	Kansas
Marky Alexander	Linebacker	Kansas
Mark Catano	Nose tackle	Valdosta State
Keith Cathion	Running back	Virginia Union
Decarlos Cleveland	Defensive end	Kent State
Anthony Corley	Running back	Nevada
Terry Echols	Linebacker	Marshall
Jeff Golias	Defensive end	Clarion
Ike Gordon	Linebacker	UCLA
Russell Graham	Tackle	Oklahoma State
Rob Horton	Linebacker	Georgia Tech
Tom Kanka	Nose tackle	Hillsdale

== Personnel ==
=== Staff ===
1984 Pittsburgh Steelers staff
Front office: Chairman of the board – Arthur J. Rooney; President – Daniel M. Rooney; Vice president – John R. McGinley; Vice president – Arthur J. Rooney, Jr.; Controller – Dennis P. Thimons; Assistant controller – Dan Ferens; Traveling secretary – James A. Boston; Publicity director – Joe Gordon; Assistant publicity director – John Evenson; Director of ticket sales – Geraldine Glenn; Assistant director of ticket sales – Jim Ellenberger; Director of player personnel – Dick Haley; Assistant director of player personnel – William Nunn, Jr.; Pro talent scout – Tom Modrak; Talent scout – West Coast – Bob Schmitz; College talent scout – Joe Krupa; Head coaches: Head coach – Chuck Noll; Offensive coaches: Offensive coordinator – Tom Moore; Offensive backfield – Dick Hoak; Offensive Line: Tackles/Tight Ends – Ron Blackledge; Offensive Line: Centers/Guards – Bill Meyers	Defensive coaches: Defensive coordinator – Tony Dungy; Inside linebackers – Dennis Fitzgerald; Outside linebackers – Jed Hughes; Defensive line – Jon Kolb; Strength and conditioning: Conditioning coach – Jon Kolb; Assistant conditioning coach – Walt Evans; Physician, M.D. – Dr. David S. Huber; Physician, M.D. – Dr. Anthony P. Yates; Physician, orthopedic – Dr. Paul Steele; Neurological surgery consultant – Dr. Joseph C. Maroon; Dentist – Dr. George P. Boucek; Ophthalmologist – Dr. Phillip Buzzelli; Trainer – Ralph Berlin; Assistant trainer – Gary Stragar; Equipment manager – Anthony Parisi; Field manager – Rodgers Freyvogel; Film director – Bob McCartney; Photographers – Harry Homa, Bill Amatucci

=== Roster ===
1984 would prove to be somewhat of a transition year for the Steelers, as it would mark the final season of several key members of their 1970s dynasty—most notably Jack Lambert (who missed several games during the season due to a recurring turf toe injury), but also Larry Brown and Craig Colquitt—as well as the retirement of Mel Blount in mid-March and the unexpected retirement of Terry Bradshaw in late July.

Additionally, Cliff Stoudt, the starting quarterback in 1983 while Bradshaw was injured, departed for the United States Football League, leaving the Steelers thin at the position after Bradshaw's retirement on the eve of training camp. The team would trade for former Miami Dolphins starter David Woodley, who had been supplanted on his former team by Oakland native and former Pitt quarterback Dan Marino. The Steelers infamously passed over Marino in the first round of the previous year's draft in favor of Gabriel Rivera, who by 1984 was already out of football; he suffered a spinal cord injury in a drunk driving crash that permanently left him a quadriplegic. Woodley would split time with Mark Malone under center.

In addition to Bradshaw, 1984 would also mark another unexpected departure: Franco Harris. Unlike Bradshaw, this would be due to a pay dispute. As Harris was closing in on Jim Brown's rushing record alongside Chicago's Walter Payton, Harris felt that he deserved a pay raise. The Rooney family, feeling that Harris was near the end of his career, felt otherwise, and it led to Harris's release during training camp. Harris would sign with the Seattle Seahawks and play eight games for that team before retiring 192 yards short of Brown's record, which would be surpassed by Payton that season.

On a positive note, 1984 would mark the first year of wide receiver Louis Lipps, who would set many team records during his career and would retire in second place on the Steelers all-time receiving list behind teammate John Stallworth; Lipps is currently fourth behind Hines Ward, Stallworth and Antonio Brown.

1984 Pittsburgh Steelers roster
Quarterbacks (QB): 10 Scott Campbell; 16 Mark Malone; 19 David Woodley; Running backs (RB): 34 Walter Abercrombie; 40 Anthony Corley; 24 Rich Erenberg; 26 Scoop Gillespie; 30 Frank Pollard; 38 Elton Veals; Wide receivers (WR): 80 Wayne Capers; 83 Louis Lipps; 82 John Stallworth; 85 Calvin Sweeney; 87 Weegie Thompson; Tight ends (TE): 89 Bennie Cunningham; 81 Darrell Nelson	Offensive linemen (OL): 77 Steve August T; 62 Tunch Ilkin T; 74 Terry Long G; 60 Randy Rasmussen G/C; 63 Pete Rostosky T; 72 Ray Snell T; 52 Mike Webster C; 61 Blake Wingle G; 73 Craig Wolfley G; Defensive linemen (DL): 78 Mark Catano DE; 67 Gary Dunn NT; 92 Keith Gary DE; 95 John Goodman DE; 64 Edmund Nelson NT; 93 Keith Willis DE	Linebackers (LB): 54 Craig Bingham OLB; 56 Robin Cole ILB; 53 Bryan Hinkle OLB; 90 Bob Kohrs ILB; 50 David Little ILB; 57 Mike Merriweather OLB; 59 Todd Seabaugh; Defensive backs (DB): 23 Chris Brown CB; 33 Harvey Clayton CB; 29 Ron Johnson SS; 31 Donnie Shell SS; 41 Sam Washington CB; 21 Eric Williams FS; 28 Robert Williams SS; 49 Dwayne Woodruff CB; 22 Rick Woods FS; Special teams (ST): 1 Gary Anderson K; 5 Craig Colquitt P	Reserve: 71 Emil Boures G (IR); 79 Larry Brown T (IR); 68 Russ Graham T (IR); 84 Chris Kolodziejski TE (IR); 58 Jack Lambert LB (IR); -- L. E. Madison LB (IR); 66 Kirk McJunkin G/T (IR); 88 John Rodgers TE (IR); 36 Todd Spencer RB (IR); Rookies in italics 49 active, 8 reserve

== Preseason ==
=== Schedule ===
Week	Date	Opponent	Game Site	Kickoff (ET)	TV	Result	Record
1	Saturday, August 4	at Cleveland Browns	Cleveland Municipal Stadium	7:30 p.m.	WPXI	W 31–14	1–0
2	Saturday, August 11	Philadelphia Eagles	Three Rivers Stadium	6:00 p.m.	WPXI	W 20–17 (OT)	2–0
3	Thursday, August 16	at Dallas Cowboys	Texas Stadium	9:00 p.m.	ABC	W 20–10	3–0
4	Saturday, August 25	at New York Giants	Giants Stadium	8:00 p.m.	WPXI	L 16–9	3–1

== Regular season ==
=== Schedule ===
Week	Date	Opponent	Location	Kickoff (ET)	TV	Result	Record
1	Sunday, September 2	Kansas City Chiefs	Three Rivers Stadium	1:00 p.m.	NBC	L 37–27	0–1
2	Thursday, September 6	at New York Jets	Giants Stadium	9:00 p.m.	ABC	W 23–17	1–1
3	Sunday, September 16	Los Angeles Rams	Three Rivers Stadium	1:00 p.m.	CBS	W 24–14	2–1
4	Sunday, September 23	at Cleveland Browns	Cleveland Municipal Stadium	1:00 p.m.	NBC	L 20–10	2–2
5	Monday, October 1	Cincinnati Bengals	Three Rivers Stadium	9:00 p.m.	ABC	W 38–17	3–2
6	Sunday, October 7	Miami Dolphins	Three Rivers Stadium	1:00 p.m.	NBC	L 31–7	3–3
7	Sunday, October 14	at San Francisco 49ers	Candlestick Park	4:00 p.m.	NBC	W 20–17	4–3
8	Sunday, October 21	at Indianapolis Colts	Hoosier Dome	1:00 p.m.	NBC	L 17–16	4–4
9	Sunday, October 28	Atlanta Falcons	Three Rivers Stadium	1:00 p.m.	CBS	W 35–10	5–4
10	Sunday, November 4	Houston Oilers	Three Rivers Stadium	1:00 p.m.	NBC	W 35–7	6–4
11	Sunday, November 11	at Cincinnati Bengals	Riverfront Stadium	1:00 p.m.	NBC	L 22–20	6–5
12	Monday, November 19	at New Orleans Saints	Louisiana Superdome	9:00 p.m.	ABC	L 27–24	6–6
13	Sunday, November 25	San Diego Chargers	Three Rivers Stadium	1:00 p.m.	NBC	W 52–24	7–6
14	Sunday, December 2	at Houston Oilers	Astrodome	1:00 p.m.	NBC	L 23–20 (OT)	7–7
15	Sunday, December 9	Cleveland Browns	Three Rivers Stadium	1:00 p.m.	NBC	W 23–20	8–7
16	Sunday, December 16	at Los Angeles Raiders	Los Angeles Memorial Coliseum	4:00 p.m.	NBC	W 13–7	9–7

=== Week 1: vs. Kansas City Chiefs ===
Kansas City Chiefs at Pittsburgh Steelers

Quarter	1	2	3	4	Total
Chiefs	7	17	13	0	37
Steelers	3	14	3	7	27

at Three Rivers Stadium, Pittsburgh, Pennsylvania

- Date: September 2, 1984
- Game time: 1:00 pm EDT
- Game weather: 84 °F or 28.9 °C (Partly Cloudy)
- Game attendance: 56,709
- Referee: Jerry Seeman
- TV announcers (NBC): Bill Wilkerson (play by play), Dave Rowe (color commentator)

Scoring summary

Quarter	Time	Drive			Team	Scoring information	Score	
Quarter	Time	Plays	Yards	TOP	Team	Scoring information	Chiefs	Steelers
1					Chiefs	Todd Blackledge 1-yard touchdown run, Nick Lowery kick good	7	0
1					Steelers	30-yard field goal by Gary Anderson	7	3
2					Chiefs	37-yard field goal by Nick Lowery	10	3
2					Chiefs	Theotis Brown 3-yard touchdown run, Nick Lowery kick good	17	3
2					Steelers	Louis Lipps 80-yard touchdown reception from David Woodley, Gary Anderson kick good	17	10
2					Chiefs	Theotis Brown 6-yard touchdown run, Nick Lowery kick good	24	10
2					Steelers	John Stallworth 29-yard touchdown reception from David Woodley, Gary Anderson kick good	24	17
3					Steelers	47-yard field goal by Gary Anderson	24	20
3					Chiefs	Stephone Paige 22-yard touchdown reception from Todd Blackledge, Nick Lowery kick good	31	20
3					Chiefs	47-yard field goal by Nick Lowery	34	20
3					Chiefs	37-yard field goal by Nick Lowery	37	20
4					Steelers	Louis Lipps 21-yard touchdown reception from Mark Malone, Gary Anderson kick good	37	27
"TOP" = time of possession. For other American football terms, see Glossary of American football.							37	27

Mark Malone and David Woodley combined for 419 passing yards, three touchdowns, and two interceptions, while the Chiefs won despite putting up just 264 yards of total offense.

=== Week 2: at New York Jets ===
Pittsburgh Steelers at New York Jets

Quarter	1	2	3	4	Total
Steelers	7	6	7	3	23
Jets	0	7	10	0	17

at Giants Stadium, East Rutherford, New Jersey

- Date: September 6, 1984
- Game time: 9:00 pm EDT
- Game weather: 62 °F (16.7 °C), wind 15 miles per hour (24 km/h; 13 kn)
- Game attendance: 70,564
- Referee: Bob McElwee
- TV announcers (ABC): Frank Gifford (play by play), Don Meredith (color commentator)

Scoring summary

Quarter	Time	Drive			Team	Scoring information	Score	
Quarter	Time	Plays	Yards	TOP	Team	Scoring information	Steelers	Jets
1					Steelers	Louis Lipps 6-yard touchdown reception from David Woodley, Gary Anderson kick good	7	0
2					Jets	Wesley Walker 14-yard touchdown reception from Pat Ryan, Pat Leahy kick good	7	7
2					Steelers	32-yard field goal by Gary Anderson	10	7
2					Steelers	43-yard field goal by Gary Anderson	13	7
3					Jets	Bobby Humphrey 97-yard kickoff return for touchdown	13	14
3					Steelers	Weegie Thompson 3-yard touchdown reception from David Woodley, Gary Anderson kick good	20	14
3					Jets	52-yard field goal by Pat Leahy	20	17
4					Steelers	27-yard field goal by Gary Anderson	23	17
"TOP" = time of possession. For other American football terms, see Glossary of American football.							23	17

After coughing up four turnovers to the Chiefs, the Steelers picked off Pat Ryan three times and forced a fumble; they also bullied the Jets into eleven penalties for 115 yards.

=== Week 3: vs. Los Angeles Rams ===
Los Angeles Rams at Pittsburgh Steelers

Quarter	1	2	3	4	Total
Rams	7	0	7	0	14
Steelers	0	14	3	7	24

at Three Rivers Stadium, Pittsburgh, Pennsylvania

- Date: September 16, 1984
- Game time: 4:00 pm EDT
- Game weather: 63 °F or 17.2 °C (Mostly Cloudy)
- Game attendance: 58,104
- Referee: Ben Dreith
- TV announcers (CBS): Jim Hill (play by play), John Dockery (color commentator)

Scoring summary

Quarter	Time	Drive			Team	Scoring information	Score	
Quarter	Time	Plays	Yards	TOP	Team	Scoring information	Rams	Steelers
1					Rams	Dwayne Crutchfield 4-yard touchdown reception from Vince Ferragamo, Mike Lansford kick good	7	0
2					Steelers	Bennie Cunningham 1-yard touchdown reception from David Woodley, Gary Anderson kick good	7	7
2					Steelers	Interception returned 12 yards for touchdown by Sam Washington, Gary Anderson kick good	7	14
3					Steelers	41-yard field goal by Gary Anderson	7	17
3					Rams	Drew Hill 57-yard touchdown reception from Jeff Kemp, Mike Lansford kick good	14	17
4					Steelers	Louis Lipps 11-yard touchdown reception from David Woodley, Gary Anderson kick good	14	24
"TOP" = time of possession. For other American football terms, see Glossary of American football.							14	24

The Steelers limited Eric Dickerson to 49 rushing yards and forced two Rams fumbles.

=== Week 4: at Cleveland Browns ===
Pittsburgh Steelers at Cleveland Browns

Quarter	1	2	3	4	Total
Steelers	0	7	3	0	10
Browns	0	0	10	10	20

at Cleveland Municipal Stadium, Cleveland, Ohio

- Date: September 23, 1984
- Game time: 1:00 pm EDT
- Game weather: 70 °F (21.1 °C), wind 12 miles per hour (19 km/h; 10 kn)
- Game attendance: 77,312
- Referee: Dick Jorgensen
- TV announcers (NBC): Dick Enberg (play by play), Merlin Olsen (color commentator)

Scoring summary

Quarter	Time	Drive			Team	Scoring information	Score	
Quarter	Time	Plays	Yards	TOP	Team	Scoring information	Steelers	Browns
2					Steelers	Interception returned 69 yards for touchdown by Sam Washington, Gary Anderson kick good	7	0
3					Browns	18-yard field goal by Matt Bahr	7	3
3					Browns	Boyce Green 44-yard touchdown reception from Paul McDonald, Matt Bahr kick good	7	10
3					Steelers	46-yard field goal by Gary Anderson	10	10
4					Browns	Duriel Harris 3-yard touchdown reception from Paul McDonald, Matt Bahr kick good	10	17
4					Browns	48-yard field goal by Matt Bahr	10	20
"TOP" = time of possession. For other American football terms, see Glossary of American football.							10	20

=== Week 5: vs. Cincinnati Bengals ===
Cincinnati Bengals at Pittsburgh Steelers

Quarter	1	2	3	4	Total
Bengals	0	10	0	7	17
Steelers	0	14	10	14	38

at Three Rivers Stadium, Pittsburgh, Pennsylvania

- Date: October 1, 1984
- Game time: 9:00 pm EDT
- Game weather: 50 °F or 10 °C (Light Rain)
- Game attendance: 57,098
- Referee: Tom Dooley
- TV announcers (ABC): Frank Gifford (play by play), Don Meredith and O. J. Simpson (color commentators)

Scoring summary

Quarter	Time	Drive			Team	Scoring information	Score	
Quarter	Time	Plays	Yards	TOP	Team	Scoring information	Bengals	Steelers
2					Steelers	Rich Erenberg 31-yard touchdown run, Gary Anderson kick good	0	7
2					Steelers	Interception returned 42 yards for touchdown by Dwayne Woodruff, Gary Anderson kick good	0	14
2					Bengals	Stanford Jennings 38-yard touchdown reception from Turk Schonert, Jim Breech kick good	7	14
2					Bengals	32-yard field goal by Jim Breech	10	14
3					Steelers	31-yard field goal by Gary Anderson	10	17
3					Steelers	Weegie Thompson 23-yard touchdown reception from David Woodley, Gary Anderson kick good	10	24
4					Bengals	Turk Schonert 1-yard touchdown run, Jim Breech kick good	17	24
4					Steelers	Walter Abercrombie 5-yard touchdown run, Gary Anderson kick good	17	31
4					Steelers	Interception returned 52 yards for touchdown by Donnie Shell, Gary Anderson kick good	17	38
"TOP" = time of possession. For other American football terms, see Glossary of American football.							17	38

=== Week 6: vs. Miami Dolphins ===
Miami Dolphins at Pittsburgh Steelers

Quarter	1	2	3	4	Total
Dolphins	0	21	3	7	31
Steelers	0	0	7	0	7

at Three Rivers Stadium, Pittsburgh, Pennsylvania

- Date: October 7, 1984
- Game time: 1:00 pm EDT
- Game weather: 66 °F or 18.9 °C (Fog & Drizzle)
- Game attendance: 59,103
- Referee: Jerry Markbreit
- TV announcers (NBC): Jay Randolph (play by play), Bob Griese (color commentator)

Scoring summary

Quarter	Time	Drive			Team	Scoring information	Score	
Quarter	Time	Plays	Yards	TOP	Team	Scoring information	Dolphins	Steelers
2					Dolphins	Bruce Hardy 3-yard touchdown reception from Dan Marino, Uwe von Schamann kick good	7	0
2					Dolphins	Joe Rose 34-yard touchdown reception from Dan Marino, Uwe von Schamann kick good	14	0
2					Dolphins	Fumble recovery returned 21 yards for touchdown by Bob Baumhower, Uwe von Schamann kick good	21	0
3					Dolphins	37-yard field goal by Uwe von Schamann	24	0
3					Steelers	Frank Pollard 1-yard touchdown run, Gary Anderson kick good	24	7
4					Dolphins	Woody Bennett 1-yard touchdown run, Uwe von Schamann kick good	31	7
"TOP" = time of possession. For other American football terms, see Glossary of American football.							7	31

==== Week 7 (Sunday, October 14, 1984): at San Francisco 49ers ====
Week 7: Pittsburgh Steelers at San Francisco 49ers

Quarter	1	2	3	4	Total
Steelers (4–3)	7	3	0	10	20
49ers (6–1)	0	7	0	10	17

at Candlestick Park • San Francisco, California

- Date: October 14, 1984
- Game time: 4:00 p.m. EDT
- Game weather: 60 °F (15.6 °C), wind 15 miles per hour (24 km/h; 13 kn)
- Game attendance: 59,110
- Referee: Pat Haggerty
- TV announcers (NBC Game only aired in the Pittsburgh markets due to NBC airing Game 5 of the World Series): Jay Randolph (play by play) and Bob Trumpy (color commentator)

Team	Category	Player	Statistics
PIT	Passing	Mark Malone	11/18, 156 YDS, 1 TD, 1 INT
PIT	Rushing	Rich Erenberg	11 CAR, 44 YDS, 1 TD
PIT	Receiving	John Stallworth	6 REC, 78 YDS, 1 TD
SF	Passing	Joe Montana	24/34, 241 YDS, 1 INT
SF	Rushing	Wendell Tyler	11 CAR, 59 YDS, 1 TD
SF	Receiving	Roger Craig	7 REC, 43 YDS

Scoring summary

Quarter	Time	Drive			Team	Scoring information	Score	
Quarter	Time	Plays	Yards	TOP	Team	Scoring information	PIT	SF
1	8:39				Steelers	Erenberg 2-yard touchdown run, Anderson kick good	7	0
2	8:00				Steelers	48-yard field goal by Anderson	10	0
2	1:03				49ers	Montana 7-yard touchdown run, Wersching kick good	10	7
4	14:52				49ers	30-yard field goal by Wersching	10	10
4	10:48				49ers	Tyler 7-yard touchdown run, Wersching kick good	10	17
4	3:21				Steelers	Stallworth 6-yard touchdown reception from Malone, Anderson kick good	17	17
4	1:42				Steelers	21-yard field goal by Anderson	20	17
"TOP" = time of possession. For other American football terms, see Glossary of American football.							20	17

- Point spread: 49ers by 8
- Over/under: 42.0 (under)
- Time of game:

Steelers	Game statistics	49ers
23	First downs	22
47–175	Rushes–yards	20–117
156	Passing yards	241
11–18–1	Passes	24–35–1
1–7	Sacked–yards	0–0
149	Net passing yards	241
324	Total yards	358
106	Return yards	131
2–41.0	Punts	3–30.7
1–0	Fumbles–lost	1–0
11–68	Penalties–yards	8–57
34:45	Time of Possession	25:15

This game was not on many NBC stations, since game 5 of the World Series was being broadcast at the same time. However, that game would prove the last Sunday afternoon World Series game. This was the solitary game the eventual Super Bowl champion 49ers lost during the 1984 season.

=== Week 8: at Indianapolis Colts ===
Pittsburgh Steelers at Indianapolis Colts

Quarter	1	2	3	4	Total
Steelers	3	10	0	3	16
Colts	0	0	0	17	17

at Hoosier Dome, Indianapolis, Indiana

- Date: October 21, 1984
- Game time: 1:00 pm EDT
- Game weather: Dome
- Game attendance: 60,026
- Referee: Bob McElwee
- TV announcers (NBC): Gary Gerould (play by play), Dave Rowe (color commentator

Scoring summary

Quarter	Time	Drive			Team	Scoring information	Score	
Quarter	Time	Plays	Yards	TOP	Team	Scoring information	Steelers	Colts
1					Steelers	53-yard field goal by Gary Anderson	3	0
2					Steelers	Louis Lipps 62-yard touchdown reception from David Woodley, Gary Anderson kick good	10	0
2					Steelers	25-yard field goal by Gary Anderson	13	0
4					Colts	41-yard field goal by Raul Allegre	13	3
4					Colts	Alvin Moore 8-yard touchdown run, Raul Allegre kick good	13	10
4					Steelers	43-yard field goal by Gary Anderson	16	10
4					Colts	Ray Butler 54-yard touchdown reception from Mike Pagel, Raul Allegre kick good	16	17
"TOP" = time of possession. For other American football terms, see Glossary of American football.							16	17

This game was particularly frustrating to Steeler fans. One week previously, the Steelers beat the 49ers in San Francisco – becoming the solitary team to achieve this as the 49ers finished 15-1 on the way to winning the Super Bowl. Then coming back east to play one of the worst teams of the season, the Indianapolis Colts – who had only two wins at that point and were to win just four games for the season – they lost on a last minute improbable play after leading throughout the game. The Colts’ third-string quarterback, Mike Pagel, came off the bench in the third quarter and was leading a final minute drive from their 20. On the Colts 40 with 34 seconds left, Pagel avoided a near sack, scrambled right and threw down the middle of the field to WR Bernard Henry. The ball however went directly to the hands of Steeler CB Sam Washington who bobbled the ball. Between Washington and a few other Steeler defenders, WR Ray Butler burst through the gap, snatched the ball in the air and ran untouched 54 yards for the touchdown. The extra point sealed the game.

And that’s why they play the game.

=== Week 9: vs. Atlanta Falcons ===
Atlanta Falcons at Pittsburgh Steelers

Quarter	1	2	3	4	Total
Falcons	0	3	0	7	10
Steelers	7	7	14	7	35

at Three Rivers Stadium, Pittsburgh, Pennsylvania

- Date: October 28, 1984
- Game time: 1:00 pm EST
- Game weather: 72 °F or 22.2 °C (Light Rain)
- Game attendance: 55,971
- Referee: Gordon McCarter
- TV announcers (CBS): Jim Hill (play by play), John Dockery (color commentator)

Scoring summary

Quarter	Time	Drive			Team	Scoring information	Score	
Quarter	Time	Plays	Yards	TOP	Team	Scoring information	Falcons	Steelers
1					Steelers	Fumble recovery returned 65 yards for touchdown by Dwayne Woodruff, Gary Anderson kick good	0	7
2					Steelers	John Stallworth 20-yard touchdown reception from Mark Malone, Gary Anderson kick good	0	14
2					Falcons	40-yard field goal by Mick Luckhurst	3	14
3					Steelers	Frank Pollard 5-yard touchdown run, Gary Anderson kick good	3	21
3					Steelers	John Stallworth 31-yard touchdown reception from Mark Malone, Gary Anderson kick good	3	28
4					Steelers	Rich Erenberg 7-yard touchdown reception from Mark Malone, Gary Anderson kick good	3	35
4					Falcons	Stacey Bailey 9-yard touchdown reception from Mike Moroski, Mick Luckhurst kick good	10	35
"TOP" = time of possession. For other American football terms, see Glossary of American football.							10	35

=== Week 10 vs. Houston Oilers ===
Houston Oilers at Pittsburgh Steelers

Quarter	1	2	3	4	Total
Oilers	0	0	7	0	7
Steelers	7	14	14	0	35

at Three Rivers Stadium, Pittsburgh, Pennsylvania

- Date: November 4, 1984
- Game time: 1:00 pm EST
- Game weather: 53 °F or 11.7 °C (Light Rain)
- Game attendance: 48,892
- Referee: Jerry Seeman
- TV announcers (NBC): Gary Gerould (play by play), Harvey Martin (color commentator)

Scoring summary

Quarter	Time	Drive			Team	Scoring information	Score	
Quarter	Time	Plays	Yards	TOP	Team	Scoring information	Oilers	Steelers
1					Steelers	John Stallworth 43-yard touchdown reception from Mark Malone, Gary Anderson kick good	0	7
2					Steelers	Mark Malone 13-yard touchdown run, Gary Anderson kick good	0	14
2					Steelers	John Stallworth 17-yard touchdown reception from Mark Malone, Gary Anderson kick good	0	21
3					Steelers	John Stallworth 39-yard touchdown reception from Mark Malone, Gary Anderson kick good	0	28
3					Steelers	Fumble recovery returned 21 yards for touchdown by Bryan Hinkle, Gary Anderson kick good	0	35
3					Oilers	Jamie Williams 5-yard touchdown reception from Oliver Luck, Joe Cooper kick good	7	35
"TOP" = time of possession. For other American football terms, see Glossary of American football.							7	35

The Steelers limited Warren Moon and Oliver Luck to 224 yards; the Oilers fumbled four times.

=== Week 11: at Cincinnati Bengals ===
Pittsburgh Steelers at Cincinnati Bengals

Quarter	1	2	3	4	Total
Steelers	0	13	0	7	20
Bengals	3	0	12	7	22

at Riverfront Stadium, Cincinnati, Ohio

- Date: November 11, 1984
- Game time: 1:00 pm EST
- Game weather: 43 °F (6.1 °C), wind 17 miles per hour (27 km/h; 15 kn)
- Game attendance: 52,497
- Referee: Ben Dreith
- TV announcers (NBC): Charlie Jones (play by play), Bob Griese (color commentator)

Scoring summary

Quarter	Time	Drive			Team	Scoring information	Score	
Quarter	Time	Plays	Yards	TOP	Team	Scoring information	Steelers	Bengals
1					Bengals	21-yard field goal by Jim Breech	0	3
2					Steelers	47-yard field goal by Gary Anderson	3	3
					Steelers	Mark Malone 1-yard touchdown run, Gary Anderson kick good	10	3
2					Steelers	21-yard field goal by Gary Anderson	13	3
3					Bengals	James Brooks 24-yard touchdown run, 2-point run failed	13	9
3					Bengals	42-yard field goal by Jim Breech	13	12
3					Bengals	28-yard field goal by Jim Breech	13	15
4					Steelers	Louis Lipps 36-yard touchdown run, Gary Anderson kick good	20	15
4					Bengals	Larry Kinnebrew 3-yard touchdown run, Jim Breech kick good	20	22
"TOP" = time of possession. For other American football terms, see Glossary of American football.							20	22

=== Week 12: at New Orleans Saints ===
Pittsburgh Steelers at New Orleans Saints

Quarter	1	2	3	4	Total
Steelers	0	14	0	10	24
Saints	3	10	0	14	27

at Louisiana Superdome, New Orleans, Louisiana

- Date: November 19, 1984
- Game time: 9:00 pm EST
- Game weather: Dome
- Game attendance: 66,005
- Referee: Fred Silva
- TV announcers (ABC): Frank Gifford (play by play), Don Meredith and O. J. Simpson (color commentators)
- Pro Football Reference; Pittsburgh Steelers at New Orleans Saints – November 19th, 1984

Scoring summary

Quarter	Time	Drive			Team	Scoring information	Score	
Quarter	Time	Plays	Yards	TOP	Team	Scoring information	Chargers	Steelers
1					Saints	27-yard field goal by Morten Andersen	0	3
2					Steelers	Louis Lipps 76-yard punt return for touchdown	7	3
2					Steelers	John Stallworth 14-yard touchdown reception from Mark Malone, Gary Anderson kick good	14	3
2					Saints	32-yard field goal by Morten Andersen	14	6
2					Saints	Larry Hardy 28-yard touchdown reception from Richard Todd, Morten Andersen kick good	14	13
4					Steelers	21-yard field goal by Gary Anderson	17	13
4					Saints	Junior Miller 21-yard touchdown reception from Richard Todd, Morten Andersen kick good	17	20
4					Saints	Interception returned 47 yards for touchdown by Dennis Winston, Morten Andersen kick good	17	27
4					Steelers	Louis Lipps 25-yard touchdown reception from Scott Campbell, Gary Anderson kick good	24	27
"TOP" = time of possession. For other American football terms, see Glossary of American football.							24	27

The Saints won their first Monday Night game in seven tries, and also avenged a 1974 Monday Night loss to the Steelers at Tulane Stadium. It was Pittsburgh's first loss to New Orleans since 1969 in what was the Steelers’ final game in the NFL before moving to the AFC as part of the AFL-NFL merger.

Former Steelers linebacker Dennis Winston played for the Saints in this game. It was also a homecoming for Lipps, who played at nearby East St. John High School.

=== Week 13: vs. San Diego Chargers ===
San Diego Chargers at Pittsburgh Steelers

Quarter	1	2	3	4	Total
Chargers	0	10	7	7	24
Steelers	3	21	21	7	52

at Three Rivers Stadium, Pittsburgh, Pennsylvania

- Date: November 25, 1984
- Game time: 1:00 pm EST
- Game weather: 54 °F or 12.2 °C (Sunny)
- Game attendance: 55,586
- Referee: Jim Tunney
- TV announcers (NBC): Len Berman (play by play), Gene Washington (color commentator)

Scoring summary

Quarter	Time	Drive			Team	Scoring information	Score	
Quarter	Time	Plays	Yards	TOP	Team	Scoring information	Chargers	Steelers
1					Steelers	55-yard field goal by Gary Anderson	0	3
2					Steelers	Louis Lipps 15-yard touchdown reception from Mark Malone, Gary Anderson kick good	0	10
2					Steelers	Frank Pollard 2-yard touchdown run, Gary Anderson kick good	0	17
2					Chargers	29-yard field goal by Rolf Benirschke	3	17
2					Steelers	John Stallworth 30-yard touchdown reception from Mark Malone, Gary Anderson kick good	3	24
2					Chargers	Lionel James 59 yard punt return for touchdown	10	24
3					Chargers	Wes Chandler 63-yard touchdown reception from Ed Luther, Rolf Benirschke kick good	17	24
3					Steelers	Frank Pollard 2-yard touchdown run, Gary Anderson kick good	17	31
3					Steelers	John Stallworth 5-yard touchdown reception from Mark Malone, Gary Anderson kick good	17	38
3					Steelers	John Stallworth 45-yard touchdown reception from Mark Malone, Gary Anderson kick good	17	45
4					Steelers	Mark Malone 1-yard touchdown run, Gary Anderson kick good	17	52
4					Chargers	Charlie Joiner 25-yard touchdown reception from Ed Luther, Rolf Benirschke kick good	24	52
"TOP" = time of possession. For other American football terms, see Glossary of American football.							24	52

=== Week 14: at Houston Oilers ===
Quarter	1	2	3	4	OT	Total
Steelers	3	0	10	7	0	20
Oilers	3	10	0	7	3	23

at Astrodome, Houston, Texas

- Date: December 2, 1984
- Game time: 1:00 pm EST
- Game weather: Dome
- Game attendance: 39,786
- Referee: Gene Barth
- TV announcers (NBC): Phil Stone (play by play), John Brodie (color commentator)

Scoring summary

Quarter	Time	Drive			Team	Scoring information	Score	
Quarter	Time	Plays	Yards	TOP	Team	Scoring information	Steelers	Oilers
1					Steelers	32-yard field goal by Gary Anderson	3	0
1					Oilers	19-yard field goal by Joe Cooper	3	3
2					Oilers	38-yard field goal by Joe Cooper	3	6
2					Oilers	Chris Dressel 5-yard touchdown reception from Warren Moon, Joe Cooper kick good	3	13
3					Steelers	Weegie Thompson 5-yard touchdown reception from Mark Malone, Gary Anderson kick good	10	13
3					Steelers	24-yard field goal by Gary Anderson	13	13
4					Oilers	Stan Edwards 5-yard touchdown run, Joe Cooper kick good	13	20
4					Steelers	Louis Lipps 7-yard touchdown reception from Mark Malone, Gary Anderson kick good	20	20
5					Oilers	30-yard field goal by Joe Cooper	20	23
"TOP" = time of possession. For other American football terms, see Glossary of American football.							20	23

The Steelers tied the game in the fourth yet fell in overtime, all despite intercepting Warren Moon three times.

=== Week 15: vs. Cleveland Browns ===
Cleveland Browns at Pittsburgh Steelers

Quarter	1	2	3	4	Total
Browns	3	10	0	7	20
Steelers	7	10	3	3	23

at Three Rivers Stadium, Pittsburgh, Pennsylvania

- Date: December 9, 1984
- Game time: 1:00 pm EST
- Game weather: 46 °F or 7.8 °C (Cloudy)
- Game attendance: 55,825
- Referee: Fred Wyant
- TV announcers (NBC): Don Criqui (play by play), Bob Trumpy (color commentator)
- Pro Football Reference; Cleveland Browns at Pittsburgh Steelers – December 9th, 1984

Scoring summary

Quarter	Time	Drive			Team	Scoring information	Score	
Quarter	Time	Plays	Yards	TOP	Team	Scoring information	Browns	Steelers
1					Browns	29-yard field goal by Matt Bahr	3	0
1					Steelers	Louis Lipps 61-yard touchdown reception from Mark Malone, Gary Anderson kick good	3	7
2					Steelers	40-yard field goal by Gary Anderson	3	10
2					Browns	49-yard field goal by Matt Bahr	6	10
2					Steelers	Frank Pollard 1-yard touchdown run, Gary Anderson kick good	6	17
2					Browns	Ricky Feacher 16-yard touchdown reception from Paul McDonald, Matt Bahr kick good	13	17
3					Steelers	22-yard field goal by Gary Anderson	13	20
4					Browns	Paul McDonald 3-yard touchdown run, Matt Bahr kick good	20	20
4					Steelers	34-yard field goal by Gary Anderson	20	23
"TOP" = time of possession. For other American football terms, see Glossary of American football.							20	23

=== Week 16: at Los Angeles Raiders ===
Pittsburgh Steelers at Los Angeles Raiders

Quarter	1	2	3	4	Total
Steelers	3	0	0	10	13
Raiders	0	0	0	7	7

at Los Angeles Memorial Coliseum, Los Angeles, California

- Date: December 16, 1984
- Game time: 4:00 pm EST
- Game weather: 53 °F (11.7 °C), wind 13 miles per hour (21 km/h; 11 kn)
- Game attendance: 83,056
- Referee: Red Cashion
- TV announcers (NBC): Jay Randolph (play by play), John Brodie (color commentator)

Scoring summary

Quarter	Time	Drive			Team	Scoring information	Score	
Quarter	Time	Plays	Yards	TOP	Team	Scoring information	Steelers	Raiders
1					Steelers	26-yard field goal by Gary Anderson	3	0
4					Steelers	Frank Pollard 1-yard touchdown run, Gary Anderson kick good	10	0
4					Steelers	37-yard field goal by Gary Anderson	13	0
4					Raiders	Dokie Williams 2-yard touchdown reception from Jim Plunkett, Chris Bahr kick good	13	7
"TOP" = time of possession. For other American football terms, see Glossary of American football.							13	7

=== Standings ===
AFC Central
	W	L	T	PCT	DIV	CONF	PF	PA	STK
Pittsburgh Steelers^{(3)}	9	7	0	.563	3–3	6–6	387	310	W2
Cincinnati Bengals	8	8	0	.500	5–1	6–6	339	339	W4
Cleveland Browns	5	11	0	.313	3–3	4–8	250	297	W1
Houston Oilers	3	13	0	.188	1–5	3–9	240	437	L2

== Playoffs ==
=== AFC Divisional Playoff: at Denver Broncos ===
1984 AFC Divisional Playoff

Quarter	1	2	3	4	Total
Steelers	0	10	7	7	24
Broncos	7	0	10	0	17

at Mile High Stadium, Denver, Colorado

- Date: December 30, 1984
- Game time: 4:00 pm EST
- Game weather: 33 °F (0.6 °C), wind 6 miles per hour (9.7 km/h; 5.2 kn), wind chills 28 °F or −2.2 °C
- Game attendance: 74,981
- Referee: Fred Wyant
- TV announcers (NBC): Dick Enberg (play by play), Merlin Olsen (color commentator)

Scoring summary

Quarter	Time	Drive			Team	Scoring information	Score	
Quarter	Time	Plays	Yards	TOP	Team	Scoring information	Steelers	Broncos
1					Broncos	James Wright 9-yard touchdown reception from John Elway, Rich Karlis kick good	0	7
2					Steelers	28-yard field goal by Gary Anderson	3	7
2					Steelers	Frank Pollard 1-yard touchdown run, Gary Anderson kick good	10	7
3					Broncos	21-yard field goal by Rich Karlis	10	10
3					Broncos	Steve Watson 20-yard touchdown reception from John Elway, Rich Karlis kick good	10	17
3					Steelers	Louis Lipps 10-yard touchdown reception from Mark Malone, Gary Anderson kick good	17	17
4					Steelers	Frank Pollard 2-yard touchdown run, Gary Anderson kick good	24	17
"TOP" = time of possession. For other American football terms, see Glossary of American football.							24	17

The Steelers sacked John Elway four times and picked him off twice.

=== AFC Championship game: at Miami Dolphins ===
1984 AFC Championship game

Quarter	1	2	3	4	Total
Steelers	7	7	7	7	28
Dolphins	7	17	14	7	45

at Miami Orange Bowl, Miami, Florida

- Date: January 6, 1985
- Game time: 12:30 PM
- Game weather: 58 °F (14.4 °C), wind 13 miles per hour (21 km/h; 11 kn)
- Game attendance: 76,029
- Referee: Jerry Markbreit
- TV announcers (NBC): Dick Enberg (play by play), Merlin Olsen (color commentator)

Scoring summary

Quarter	Time	Drive			Team	Scoring information	Score	
Quarter	Time	Plays	Yards	TOP	Team	Scoring information	Steelers	Dolphins
1					Dolphins	Mark Clayton 40-yard touchdown reception from Dan Marino, Uwe von Schamann kick good	0	7
1					Steelers	Rich Erenberg 7-yard touchdown run, Gary Anderson kick good	7	7
2					Dolphins	26-yard field goal by Uwe von Schamann	7	10
2					Steelers	John Stallworth 65-yard touchdown reception from Mark Malone, Gary Anderson kick good	14	10
2					Dolphins	Mark Duper 41-yard touchdown reception from Dan Marino, Uwe von Schamann kick good	14	17
2					Dolphins	Tony Nathan 2-yard touchdown run, Uwe von Schamann kick good	14	24
3					Dolphins	Mark Duper 36-yard touchdown reception from Dan Marino, Uwe von Schamann kick good	14	31
3					Steelers	John Stallworth 19-yard touchdown reception from Mark Malone, Gary Anderson kick good	21	31
3					Dolphins	Woody Bennett 1-yard touchdown run, Uwe von Schamann kick good	21	38
4					Dolphins	Nat Moore 6-yard touchdown reception from Dan Marino, Uwe von Schamann kick good	21	45
4					Steelers	Wayne Capers 29-yard touchdown reception from Mark Malone, Gary Anderson kick good	28	45
"TOP" = time of possession. For other American football terms, see Glossary of American football.							28	45

Dan Marino threw four touchdowns and over 400 yards, outdueling Mark Malone’s 312 yards and three scores; Miami picked off Malone three times.

== Honors and awards ==
- UPI AFC Rookie of the Year – Louis Lipps wide receiver
- AP Offensive Rookie of the Year – Louis Lipps
- NFL Comeback Player of the Year – John Stallworth
