= 1988 Pittsburgh Steelers season =

NFL team season

- Owner: The Rooney Family
- General manager: Dick Haley
- Head coach: Chuck Noll
- Offensive coordinator: Tom Moore
- Defensive coordinator: Tony Dungy
- Home stadium: Three Rivers Stadium

Results
- Record: 5–11
- Division place: 4th AFC Central
- Playoffs: Did not qualify
- All-Pros: None
- Pro Bowlers: OT Tunch Ilkin
- Team MVP: David Little; Rod Woodson
- Team ROY: Warren Williams

The 1988 Pittsburgh Steelers season was the franchise's 56th in the National Football League. Hall of Fame team founder and owner Art Rooney died at age 87 less than two weeks before the start of the season on August 25. The team wore AJR patches on the left shoulder the entire season in memory of "The Chief".

The team finished the season at 5–11 failing to improve on their 8–7 record from 1987, and had their worst record since finishing an NFL-worst 1–13 in 1969. As of 2024, the 5–11 mark remains the team's worst record since 1969, and they have only finished with ten losses twice since, in 1999 and 2003.

The Steelers got off to a disappointing start. After winning their home opener against the Dallas Cowboys, the team lost six straight, their first six-game losing streak since 1969. The team never recovered after the skid, and at one point had a 2–10 record after a 27–7 loss to the Cleveland Browns. It was the Steelers worst start to a season since the merger. The Steelers did, however, finish the season on a positive note, winning 3 of their last 4 games to finish the season 5–11. To date, this represents the only time since the AFL-NFL merger the Steelers have finished the season last place in their division. Their poor win-loss record was primarily attributable to their defense, as the Steelers finished last in the NFL in both points allowed and yards allowed.

== Chuck Noll controversy ==
During the season, due to the team's struggles there were calls from the media and fans for longtime head coach Chuck Noll to step down, particularly after an embarrassing loss to the eventual AFC champions Cincinnati Bengals 42–7. Following that game, Noll said that everyone "should go out and get law degrees", in reference to cornerback Dwayne Woodruff having recently passed the bar exam in preparation for his law career after he retired as well as Woodruff's bad game against the Bengals.

Following the season, Noll intended to resign until defensive line coach Joe Greene got word and informed Dan Rooney (who had considered firing Noll), leading to Rooney and Noll to make some compromises. In exchange for lifetime employment with the team (Noll would be listed in media guides as an administrative advisor from his retirement from coaching until his death in 2014), Noll agreed to part ways with several members of his coaching staff.

One negative side effect to Noll making changes to his coaching staff was the loss of defensive coordinator Tony Dungy. Rooney wanted Dungy demoted to defensive backs coach, but Dungy opted to leave for the Kansas City Chiefs, taking the same position with that team and working under their defensive coordinator—and Noll's eventual replacement--Bill Cowher. While Dungy would go on to have a Hall of Fame career as head coach of the Tampa Bay Buccaneers and Indianapolis Colts, the loss of Dungy likely delayed his eventual ascension to head coach in the NFL.

== Offseason ==
The Steelers saw two of its last three remaining players who won all four Super Bowls retire in wide receiver John Stallworth and strong safety Donnie Shell, who were both from the team's famous Class of 1974 that saw four players go on to the Pro Football Hall of Fame (although Shell was undrafted, he was still from the same rookie class), and in the case of Stallworth, retired as the team's all-time leading receiver. (Stallworth's record was surpassed by Hines Ward in 2005.)

Mike Webster, who was also from the Class of 1974, entered the season as the sole remaining member of all four Super Bowl teams. However, change appeared to be imminent when the team drafted Kentucky guard Dermontti Dawson in the second round of the 1988 draft. Although Dawson would be playing guard his rookie season alongside Webster, it was apparent that Dawson was drafted to be groomed as Webster's eventual replacement at center. Webster would be released by the Steelers in the following offseason, officially ending the team's link to all four Super Bowl clubs.

To the delight of Steelers fans, and even most of the players, the Mark Malone era officially ended in the offseason as well. Malone, who had lost the starting quarterback job to Bubby Brister the previous year, was traded to the San Diego Chargers during the offseason. Malone had also become hugely unpopular with fans and teammates for blaming his mistakes on other players and acting as if he were the "heir" to the QB position after the retirement of Terry Bradshaw. At one point, a locker room fight between Malone and the rest of the team ensued before being broken up by veteran offensive tackle Tunch Ilkin.

=== NFL draft ===
1988 Pittsburgh Steelers draft
Round	Pick	Player	Position	College	Notes
1	17	Aaron Jones	Defensive end	Eastern Kentucky	
2	44	Dermontti Dawson * ^{†}	Center	Kentucky	
3	70	Chuck Lanza	Center	Notre Dame	
5	121	Darin Jordan	Linebacker	Northeastern	
5	128	Jerry Reese	Defensive end	Kentucky	
6	155	Warren Williams	Running back	Miami (FL)	
7	182	Marc Zeno	Wide receiver	Tulane	
8	209	Mark Nichols	Nose tackle	Michigan State	
8	211	Mike Hinnant	Tight end	Temple	
9	236	Gordon Lockbaum	Running back	Holy Cross	
10	252	John Jackson	Offensive tackle	Eastern Kentucky	
11	295	Bobby Dawson	Defensive back	Illinois	
12	322	James Earle	Linebacker	Clemson	
Made roster † Pro Football Hall of Fame * Made at least one Pro Bowl during career

=== Undrafted free agents ===
1988 undrafted free agents of note
Player	Position	College
Tolbert Bain	Safety	Miami (FL)
Tim Calcagno	Offensive tackle	Southwestern Louisiana
Brian Cobb	Wide receiver	Rutgers
John Dominic	Nose tackle	Syracuse
Herb Gainer	Wide receiver	Florida State
Andy Garczynski	Wide receiver	Temple
Pete Giftopoulos	Linebacker	Penn State
Jonathan Green	Running back	Waynesburg
Earnest Jones	Running back	Virginia Tech
Greg Lee	Defensive back	Arkansas State
Jeff Markland	Tight end	Illinois
Keith Mattioli	Wide receiver	Virginia
Cassius Osborn	Wide receiver	Georgia
Mark Sindlinger	Center	Iowa
Dwight Sistrunk	Safety	Iowa

== Personnel ==
=== Staff / Coaches ===
1988 Pittsburgh Steelers staff
Front office: Chairman of the board – Arthur J. Rooney; President – Daniel M. Rooney; Vice president – John R. McGinley; Vice president – Arthur J. Rooney, Jr.; Business manager – Joe Gordon; Controller – Ralph Meacham; Chief negotiator – James A. Boston; Office manager - stadium – Dan Ferens; Publicity director – Dan Edwards; Assistant publicity director – Pat Hanlon; Director of ticket sales – Geraldine Glenn; Computer director - accounting – Jim Ellenberger; Director of player personnel – Dick Haley; Director of pro scouting – Tom Modrak; Talent scout – East – Tom Donahoe; Talent scout – Midwest – Jesse Kaye; Talent scout – West Coast – Bob Schmitz; Head coaches: Head coach – Chuck Noll; Offensive coaches: Offensive coordinator – Tom Moore; Offensive line: tackles/tight ends – Ron Blackledge; Offensive backfield – Dick Hoak; Offensive line: centers/guards – Hal Hunter; Special teams/ offensive assistant – Jon Kolb; Receivers – Dwain Painter	Defensive coaches: Defensive coordinator – Tony Dungy; Special teams/defensive assistant – Dennis Fitzgerald; Defensive line – Joe Greene; Linebackers – Jed Hughes; Strength and conditioning: Conditioning & training coach – Walt Evans; Dentist – Dr. George P. Boucek; Ophthalmologist – Dr. Phillip Buzzelli; Physician, orthopedic – Dr. Thomas W. Cowan; Physician, M.D. – Dr. David S. Huber; Neurological surgery consultant – Dr. Joseph C. Maroon; Physician, M.D. – Dr. Richard Rydze; Physician, consultant – Dr. Abraham J.Twerski; Physician, M.D. – Dr. Anthony P. Yates; Trainer – Ralph Berlin; Trainer – Fran Feld; Equipment manager – Anthony Parisi; Field manager – Rodgers Freyvogel; Video & film director – Bob McCartney; Photographers – Mike Fabus, Bill Amatucci

=== Roster ===
1988 Pittsburgh Steelers roster
Quarterbacks (QB): 14 Todd Blackledge; 13 Steve Bono; 6 Bubby Brister; Running backs (RB): 24 Rodney Carter; 33 Merril Hoge FB; 43 Earnest Jackson; 30 Frank Pollard; 20 Dwight Stone KR; 42 Warren Williams; Wide receivers (WR): 85 Troy Johnson; 83 Louis Lipps; 89 Charles Lockett; 87 Weegie Thompson; Tight ends (TE): 86 Preston Gothard; 81 Mike Hinnant; 88 Jeff Markland	Offensive linemen (OL): 60 Brian Blankenship G; 63 Dermontti Dawson G; 62 Tunch Ilkin T; 65 John Jackson T; 51 Chuck Lanza C; 74 Terry Long G; 52 Mike Webster C; 73 Craig Wolfley T; Defensive linemen (DL): 68 Lorenzo Freeman NT; 92 Keith Gary DE; 78 Tim Johnson DE; 76 Rollin Putzier NT; 64 Jerry Reese DE; 98 Gerald Williams NT	Linebackers (LB): 91 Gregg Carr ILB; 96 Anthony Henton OLB; 55 Darin Jordan OLB; 50 David Little ILB; 95 Greg Lloyd OLB; 54 Hardy Nickerson ILB; 90 Tyronne Stowe ILB; Defensive backs (DB): 27 Thomas Everett FS; 29 Cornell Gowdy SS; 22 Larry Griffin SS; 35 Delton Hall CB/S; 21 Greg Lee CB; 28 Lupe Sanchez FS; 49 Dwayne Woodruff CB; 26 Rod Woodson CB; Special teams (ST): 1 Gary Anderson K; 18 Harry Newsome P	Reserve: 72 Buddy Aydelette T (IR); 53 Bryan Hinkle LB (IR); 97 Aaron Jones LB/DE (IR); 79 John Rienstra G (IR); 93 Keith Willis DE (IR); Rookies in italics 47 active, 5 reserve

== Preseason ==
=== Schedule ===
Week	Date	Opponent	Game site	Kickoff (ET)	TV	Result	Record
1	Fri. Aug. 5	at Washington Redskins	RFK Stadium	8:00 p.m.	WTAE	W 44–31	1–0
2	Sun. Aug. 14	Philadelphia Eagles	Three Rivers Stadium	8:00 p.m.	WTAE	W 21–16	2–0
3	Sat. Aug. 20	at New York Giants	Giants Stadium	8:00 p.m.	WTAE	L 28–17	2–1
4	Sat. Aug. 27	at New Orleans Saints	Louisiana Superdome	12:30 p.m.	ABC	W 31–28	3–1

== Regular season ==
=== Schedule ===
Week	Date	Opponent	Game site	Kickoff (ET)	TV	Result	Record
1	Sun. Sep. 4	Dallas Cowboys	Three Rivers Stadium	1:00 p.m.	CBS	W 24–21	1–0
2	Sun. Sep. 11	at Washington Redskins	RFK Stadium	1:00 p.m.	NBC	L 30–29	1–1
3	Sun. Sep. 18	Cincinnati Bengals	Three Rivers Stadium	1:00 p.m.	NBC	L 17–12	1–2
4	Sun. Sep. 25	at Buffalo Bills	Rich Stadium	1:00 p.m.	NBC	L 36–28	1–3
5	Sun. Oct. 2	Cleveland Browns	Three Rivers Stadium	1:00 p.m.	NBC	L 23–9	1–4
6	Sun. Oct. 9	at Phoenix Cardinals	Sun Devil Stadium	4:00 p.m.	NBC	L 31–14	1–5
7	Sun. Oct. 16	Houston Oilers	Three Rivers Stadium	1:00 p.m.	NBC	L 34–14	1–6
8	Sun. Oct. 23	Denver Broncos	Three Rivers Stadium	1:00 p.m.	NBC	W 39–21	2–6
9	Sun. Oct. 30	at New York Jets	Giants Stadium	1:00 p.m.	NBC	L 24–20	2–7
10	Sun. Nov. 6	at Cincinnati Bengals	Riverfront Stadium	1:00 p.m.	NBC	L 42–7	2–8
11	Sun. Nov. 13	Philadelphia Eagles	Three Rivers Stadium	1:00 p.m.	CBS	L 27–26	2–9
12	Sun. Nov. 20	at Cleveland Browns	Cleveland Municipal Stadium	1:00 p.m.	NBC	L 27–7	2–10
13	Sun. Nov. 27	Kansas City Chiefs	Three Rivers Stadium	1:00 p.m.	NBC	W 16–10	3–10
14	Sun. Dec. 4	at Houston Oilers	Astrodome	8:00 p.m.	ESPN	W 37–34	4–10
15	Sun. Dec. 11	at San Diego Chargers	Jack Murphy Stadium	4:00 p.m.	NBC	L 20–14	4–11
16	Sun. Dec. 18	Miami Dolphins	Three Rivers Stadium	1:00 p.m.	NBC	W 40–24	5–11

=== Game summaries ===
==== Week 1 ====
Team	1	2	3	4	Total
Cowboys	7	0	7	7	21
• Steelers	10	0	7	7	24

- Date: September 4
- Location: Three Rivers Stadium, Pittsburgh, Pennsylvania
- Game start: 1:00 p.m. EDT
- Game attendance: 56,813
- Game weather: 70 °F (21 °C) (Cloudy)
- Referee: Gordon McCarter
- TV announcers (CBS): Tim Brant and Hank Stram

Scoring drives:

- Dallas – Newsome 3 run (Zendejas kick)
- Pittsburgh – Jackson 15 run (Anderson kick)
- Pittsburgh – FG Anderson 32
- Pittsburgh – Brister 1 run (Anderson kick)
- Dallas – Irvin 35 pass from Pelluer (Zendejas kick)
- Pittsburgh – Jackson 29 run (Anderson kick)
- Dallas – Alexander 8 pass from Pelluer (Zendejas kick)

==== Week 2 ====
Team	1	2	3	4	Total
Steelers	3	10	6	10	29
• Redskins	7	3	7	13	30

- Date: September 11
- Location: RFK Stadium, Washington, D.C.
- Game start: 1:00 p.m. EDT
- Game attendance: 54,083
- Referee: Gene Barth
- TV announcers (NBC): Curt Gowdy and Merlin Olsen

Scoring drives:

- Pittsburgh – FG Anderson 33
- Washington – Clark 55 pass from Williams (Lohmiller kick)
- Pittsburgh – FG Anderson 24
- Washington – FG Lohmiller 37
- Pittsburgh – Lipps 80 pass from Brister (Anderson kick)
- Pittsburgh – Brister 6 run (kick failed)
- Washington – Morris 1 run (Lohmiller kick)
- Washington – FG Lohmiller 46
- Pittsburgh – Stone 72 pass from Brister (Anderson kick)
- Pittsburgh – FG Anderson 43
- Washington – Bryant 7 pass from Williams (Lohmiller kick)
- Washington – FG Lohmiller 19

==== Week 3 ====
Cincinnati Bengals (2–0) at Pittsburgh Steelers (1–1)

Quarter	1	2	3	4	Total
Bengals	0	7	3	7	17
Steelers	2	0	7	3	12

at Three Rivers Stadium • Pittsburgh, PA

- Date: September 18
- Game time: 1:00 p.m.
- Game weather: Mostly cloudy; 73 °F (23 °C)
- Game attendance: 56,647
- Referee: Tom Dooley
- TV announcers (NBC): Jim Donovan and Reggie Rucker
- The Football Database

Game information

Bengals

- Boomer Esiason
  15/27, 223 Yds, 2 TD, INT
- James Brooks
  19 Rush, 88 Yds
- Tim McGee
  5 Rec, 73 Yds

Steelers

- Bubby Brister
  15/30, 235 Yds, TD, 2 INT
- Dwight Stone
  14 Rush, 50 Yds
  4 Rec, 76 Yds

Scoring summary

Quarter	Time	Drive			Team	Scoring information	Score	
Quarter	Time	Plays	Yards	TOP	Team	Scoring information	CIN	PIT
1	13:27				Steelers	Safety, holding penalty on Montoya in end zone	0	2
2	9:22				Bengals	Wilson 13-yard touchdown reception from Esiason, Breech kick good	7	2
3	6:55				Steelers	Lipps 9-yard touchdown reception from Brister, Anderson kick good	7	9
3	3:18				Bengals	32-yard field goal by Breech	10	9
4	11:48				Steelers	19-yard field goal by Anderson	10	12
4	10:01				Bengals	Brown 65-yard touchdown reception from Esiason, Breech kick good	17	12
"TOP" = time of possession. For other American football terms, see Glossary of American football.							17	12

==== Week 4 ====
Team	1	2	3	4	Total
Steelers	0	14	0	14	28
• Bills	10	6	14	6	36

- Date: September 25
- Location: Rich Stadium, Orchard Park, New York
- Game start: 1:00 p.m. EDT
- Game attendance: 78,735
- Referee: Ben Dreith
- TV announcers (NBC): Curt Gowdy and Al DeRogatis

Scoring drives:

- Buffalo – FG Norwood 38
- Buffalo – Burkett 26 pass from Kelly (Norwood kick)
- PIttsburgh – Brister 1 run (Anderson kick)
- Buffalo – FG Norwood 39
- Pittsburgh – W. Williams 5 pass from Brister (Anderson kick)
- Buffalo – FG Norwood 39
- Buffalo – Riddick 1 run (Norwood kick)
- Buffalo – Riddick 5 blocked punt return (Norwood kick)
- Buffalo – FG Norwood 48
- Buffalo – FG Norwood 49
- Pittsburgh – Brister 1 run (Anderson kick)
- Pittsburgh – Thompson 42 pass from Brister (Anderson kick)

==== Week 5 ====
Team	1	2	3	4	Total
• Browns	0	7	6	10	23
Steelers	6	3	0	0	9

- Date: October 2
- Location: Three Rivers Stadium, Pittsburgh, Pennsylvania
- Game start: 1:00 p.m. EDT
- Game attendance: 56,410
- Game weather: 67 °F (19 °C) (Overcast)
- Referee: Dick Hantak
- TV announcers (NBC): Jim Donovan and Reggie Rucker

Scoring drives:

- Pittsburgh – FG Anderson 49
- Pittsburgh – FG Anderson 35
- Cleveland – Manoa 1 run (Bahr kick)
- Pittsburgh – FG Anderson 45
- Cleveland – FG Bahr 22
- Cleveland – FG Bahr 21
- Cleveland – Washington 75 interception return (Bahr kick)
- Cleveland – FG Bahr 40

==== Week 6 ====
Team	1	2	3	4	Total
Steelers	7	0	0	7	14
• Cardinals	7	17	7	0	31

- Date: October 9
- Location: Sun Devil Stadium, Tempe, Arizona
- Game start: 4:00 p.m. EDT
- Game attendance: 53,278
- Game weather: 94 °F (34 °C) (Sunny)
- Referee: Johnny Grier
- TV announcers (NBC): Gary Gerould and Jon Morris

Scoring drives:

- Phoenix – Awalt 32 pass from Lomax (Del Greco kick)
- Pittsburgh – Woodson 92 kickoff return (Anderson kick)
- Phoenix – FG Del Greco 19
- Phoenix – Jordan 1 run (Del Greco kick)
- Phoenix – J. T. Smith 13 pass from Lomax (Del Greco kick)
- Phoenix – J. T. Smith 3 pass from Lomax (Del Greco kick)
- Pittsburgh – Hoge 12 pass from Bono (Anderson kick)

==== Week 7 ====
Team	1	2	3	4	Total
• Oilers	6	12	7	9	34
Steelers	0	7	0	7	14

- Date: October 16
- Location: Three Rivers Stadium, Pittsburgh, Pennsylvania
- Game start: 1:00 p.m. EDT
- Game attendance: 52,229
- Game weather: 69 °F (21 °C) (Mostly Cloudy)
- Referee: Jerry Markbreit
- TV announcers (NBC): Jay Randolph and Reggie Rucker

Scoring drives:

- Houston – Rozier 2 run (pass failed)
- Houston – FG Zendejas 50
- Houston – Safety, Seale blocked punt out of end zone
- Houston – Givins 43 pass from Moon (Zendejas kick)
- Pittsburgh – Lockett 9 pass from Blackledge (Anderson kick)
- Houston – Pinkett 1 run (Zendejas kick)
- Houston – FG Zendejas 27
- Houston – Hill 24 pass from Moon (kick failed)
- Pittsburgh – Hoge 1 run (Anderson kick)

==== Week 8 ====
Team	1	2	3	4	Total
Broncos	0	0	7	14	21
• Steelers	14	13	3	9	39

- Date: October 23
- Location: Three Rivers Stadium, Pittsburgh, Pennsylvania
- Game start: 1:00 p.m. EDT
- Game attendance: 49,811
- Game weather: 50 °F (10 °C) (Mostly Cloudy)
- Referee: Gene Barth
- TV announcers (NBC): Sam Nover and Dave Lapham

Scoring drives:

- Pittsburgh – Carter 64 run (Anderson kick)
- Pittsburgh – Blackledge 1 run (Anderson kick)
- Pittsburgh – FG Anderson 30
- Pittsburgh – Carter 10 pass from Blackledge (Anderson kick)
- Pittsburgh – FG Anderson 32
- Denver – Kay 17 pass from Kubiak (Karlis kick)
- Pittsburgh – FG Anderson 21
- Pittsburgh – FG Anderson 37
- Pittsburgh – FG Anderson 22
- Denver – Kay 14 pass from Kubiak (Karlis kick)
- Denver – Nattiel 74 pass from Karcher (Karlis kick)
- Pittsburgh – FG Anderson 30

==== Week 9 ====
Team	1	2	3	4	Total
Steelers	10	0	0	10	20
• Jets	0	10	7	7	24

- Date: October 30
- Location: Giants Stadium, East Rutherford, New Jersey
- Game start: 1:00 p.m. EST
- Game attendance: 64,862
- Referee: Tom Dooley
- TV announcers (NBC): Marv Albert and Paul Maguire

Scoring drives:

- Pittsburgh – FG Anderson 25
- Pittsburgh – Carter 24 pass from Brister (Anderson kick)
- New York Jets – FG Leahy 41
- New York Jets – Shuler 2 pass from O'Brien (Leahy kick)
- New York Jets – Hector 2 run (Leahy kick)
- Pittsburgh – FG Anderson 21
- New York Jets – McNeil 5 run (Leahy kick)
- PIttsburgh – Jackson 17 run (Anderson kick)

==== Week 10 ====
Pittsburgh Steelers (2–7) at Cincinnati Bengals (7–2)

Quarter	1	2	3	4	Total
Steelers	7	0	0	0	7
Bengals	14	7	14	7	42

at Riverfront Stadium • Cincinnati, Ohio

- Date: November 6
- Game time: 1:00 p.m.
- Game attendance: 56,403
- Referee: Red Cashion
- TV announcers (NBC): Jim Donovan and Joe Namath
- The Football Database

Game information

Steelers

- Bubby Brister
  11/29, 147 Yds
- Merril Hoge
  15 Rush, 46 Yds
- Weegie Thompson
  3 Rec, 57 Yds

Bengals

- Boomer Esiason
  16/23, 318 Yds, 3 TD, 2 INT
- Ickey Woods
  10 Rush, 110 Yds
- Eddie Brown
  7 Rec, 216 Yds, 2 TD

Scoring summary

Quarter	Time	Drive			Team	Scoring information	Score	
Quarter	Time	Plays	Yards	TOP	Team	Scoring information	PIT	CIN
1	12:13				Bengals	Brown 86-yard touchdown reception from Esiason, Breech kick good	0	7
1	6:25				Steelers	Brister 9-yard touchdown run, Anderson kick good	7	7
1	1:16				Bengals	McGee 5-yard touchdown reception from Esiason, Breech kick good	7	14
2	4:19				Bengals	Brooks 3-yard touchdown run, Breech kick good	7	21
3	12:28				Bengals	Brooks 2-yard touchdown run, Breech kick good	7	28
3	9:42				Bengals	Brown 6-yard touchdown reception from Esiason, Breech kick good	7	35
4	10:52				Bengals	Brooks 9-yard touchdown run, Breech kick good	7	42
"TOP" = time of possession. For other American football terms, see Glossary of American football.							7	42

==== Week 11 ====
Team	1	2	3	4	Total
• Eagles	0	14	3	10	27
Steelers	10	6	7	3	26

- Date: November 13
- Location: Three Rivers Stadium, Pittsburgh, Pennsylvania
- Game start: 1:00 p.m. EST
- Game attendance: 46,026
- Game weather: 47 °F (8 °C) (Overcast)
- Referee: Fred Wyant
- TV announcers (CBS): Tim Ryan and Dan Jiggetts

Scoring drives:

- Pittsburgh – FG Anderson 52
- Pittsburgh – Hoge 13 pass from Lipps (Anderson kick)
- Philadelphia – Byars 1 run (Zendejas kick)
- Pittsburgh – FG Anderson 21
- Philadelphia – Cunningham 7 run (Zendejas kick)
- Pittsburgh – FG Anderson 29
- Philadelphia – FG Zendejas 34
- Pittsburgh – Lipps 89 pass from Brister (Anderson kick)
- Philadelphia – Cunningham 12 run (Zendejas kick)
- Pittsburgh – FG Anderson 41
- Philadelphia – FG Zendejas 18

==== Week 12 ====
Team	1	2	3	4	Total
Steelers	0	7	0	0	7
• Browns	3	14	7	3	27

- Date: November 20
- Location: Cleveland Municipal Stadium, Cleveland, Ohio
- Game start: 1:00 p.m. EST
- Game attendance: 77,131
- Referee: Ben Dreith
- TV announcers (NBC): Sam Nover and Jon Morris

Scoring drives:

- Cleveland – FG Bahr 32
- Cleveland – Tennell 2 pass from Kosar (Bahr kick)
- Cleveland – Minnifield 11 blocked punt return (Bahr kick)
- Pittsburgh – Carter 1 run (Anderson kick)
- Cleveland – Langhorne 77 pass from Kosar (Bahr kick)
- Cleveland – FG Bahr 34

As of 2025, this remains the last time the Steelers were swept by the Browns.

==== Week 13 ====
Team	1	2	3	4	Total
Chiefs	0	7	0	3	10
• Steelers	6	7	3	0	16

- Date: November 27
- Location: Three Rivers Stadium, Pittsburgh, Pennsylvania
- Game start: 1:00 p.m. EST
- Game attendance: 42,057
- Game weather: 63 °F (17 °C) (Mostly Cloudy)
- Referee: Dick Jorgensen
- TV announcers (NBC): Gary Gerould and Reggie Rucker

Scoring drives:

- PIttsburgh – FG Anderson 23
- PIttsburgh – FG Anderson 20
- Kansas City – Paige 4 pass from DeBerg (Lowery kick)
- Pittsburgh – Hoge 10 run (Anderson kick)
- Pittsburgh – FG Anderson 22
- Kansas City – FG Lowery 26

==== Week 14 ====
Team	1	2	3	4	Total
• Steelers	3	14	7	13	37
Oilers	0	13	14	7	34

- Date: December 4
- Location: Astrodome, Houston, Texas
- Game start: 8:00 p.m. EST
- Game attendance: 47,791
- Game weather: Indoors (Dome)
- Referee: Bob McElwee
- TV announcers (ESPN): Mike Patrick and Joe Theismann

Scoring drives:

- Pittsburgh – FG Anderson 45
- Houston – FG Zendejas 36
- Pittsburgh – Stone 92 kickoff return (Anderson kick)
- Houston – Rozier 6 pass from Moon (Zendejas kick)
- Houston – FG Zendejas 41
- Pittsburgh – Lipps 80 pass from Brister (Anderson kick)
- Pittsburgh – 65 pass from Brister (Anderson kick)
- Houston – White 90 kickoff return (Zendejas kick)
- Houston – Moon 2 run (Zendejas kick)
- Pittsburgh – Hoge 2 run (Anderson kick)
- Houston – Moon 3 run (Zendejas kick)
- PIttsburgh – Hoge 16 pass from Brister (kick failed)

==== Week 15 ====
Team	1	2	3	4	Total
Steelers	0	0	0	14	14
• Chargers	0	14	0	6	20

- Date: December 11
- Location: Jack Murphy Stadium, San Diego, California
- Game start: 4:00 p.m. EST
- Game attendance: 33,816
- Game weather: 70°
- Referee: Fred Silva
- TV announcers (NBC): Jay Randolph and Reggie Rucker

Scoring drives:

- San Diego – Flutie 6 pass from Malone (DeLine kick)
- San Diego – Malone 1 run (DeLine kick)
- San Diego – FG DeLine 24
- Pittsburgh – Gothard 3 pass from Brister (Anderson kick)
- Pittsburgh – Brister 3 run (Anderson kick)
- San Diego – FG DeLine 42

==== Week 16 ====
Team	1	2	3	4	Total
Dolphins	10	7	0	7	24
• Steelers	7	13	7	13	40

- Date: December 18
- Location: Three Rivers Stadium, Pittsburgh, Pennsylvania
- Game start: 1:00 p.m. EST
- Game attendance: 36,051
- Game weather: 21 °F (−6 °C) (Snow)
- Referee: Fred Wyant
- TV announcers (NBC): Tom Hammond and Joe Namath

Scoring drives:

- Pittsburgh – Woodruff 78 interception return (Anderson kick)
- Miami – Hampton 4 run (Reveiz kick)
- Miami – FG Reveiz 20
- Pittsburgh – Lipps 39 run (Anderson kick)
- Miami – Hampton 1 run (Reveiz kick)
- Pittsburgh – FG Anderson 34
- Pittsburgh – FG Anderson 43
- Pittsburgh – Carter 1 run (Anderson kick)
- Pittsburgh – FG Anderson 34
- Pittsburgh – Jordan 28 interception return (Anderson kick)
- Pittsburgh – FG Anderson 22
- Miami – Clayton 13 pass from Jaworski (Reveiz kick)

As of 2025, this marks the last time the Steelers finished with fewer than 6 wins or last in their division.

=== Standings ===
AFC Central
	W	L	T	PCT	DIV	CONF	PF	PA	STK
^{(1)} Cincinnati Bengals	12	4	0	.750	4–2	8–4	448	329	W1
^{(4)} Cleveland Browns	10	6	0	.625	4–2	6–6	304	288	W1
^{(5)} Houston Oilers	10	6	0	.625	3–3	7–5	424	365	L1
Pittsburgh Steelers	5	11	0	.313	1–5	4–8	336	421	W1
