= 1983 All-South Independent football team =

American college football season

The 1983 All-South Independent football team consists of American football players chosen by the Associated Press for their All-South independent teams for the 1983 NCAA Division I-A football season.

== Offense ==
=== Quarterbacks ===
- Bernie Kosar, Miami (AP-1)
- Kevin Ingram, East Carolina (AP-2)

=== Running backs ===
- Greg Allen, Florida State (AP-1)
- Ernest Byner, East Carolina (AP-1)
- Sam DeJarnette, Southern Mississippi (AP-2)
- Albert Bentley, Miami (AP-2)

=== Wide receivers ===
- Wayne Smith, Tulane (AP-1)
- Louis Lipps, Southern Mississippi (AP-1)
- Weegie Thompson, Florida State (AP-2)
- Henry Williams, East Carolina (AP-2)

=== Tight ends ===
- Glenn Dennison, Miami (AP-1)
- Norwood Vann, East Carolina (AP-2)

=== Offensive tackles ===
- Glen Howe, Southern Mississippi (AP-1)
- John Robertson, East Carolina (AP-1)
- Don Maggs, Tulane (AP-2)
- Dave Heffernan, Miami (AP-2)

=== Offensive guards ===
- Terry Long, East Carolina (AP-1)
- Alvin Ward, Miami (AP-1)
- Jamie Dukes, Florida State (AP-2)
- Chris Boudreaux, Louisiana-Lafayette (AP-2)

=== Centers ===
- Tom McCormick, Florida State (AP-1)
- Steve Carmody, Southern Mississippi (AP-2)

== Defense ==
=== Defensive ends ===
- Jeff Pegues, East Carolina (AP-1)
- Tim Harris, Memphis (AP-1)
- David Marvel, Virginia Tech (AP-2)
- Andy Martin, Louisiana-Monroe (AP-2)

=== Defensive tackles ===
- Bruce Smith, Virginia Tech (AP-1)
- Alphonso Carreker, Florida State (AP-1)
- Jearld Baylis, Southern Mississippi (AP-1)
- Tony Fitzpatrick, Miami (AP-2)
- Clinton Wenzel, Tulane (AP-2)
- Hal Stephens, East Carolina (AP-2)
- Richard Byrd, Southern Mississippi (AP-2)
- Kevin Fagan, Miami (AP-2)

=== Linebackers ===
- Jay Brophy, Miami (AP-1)
- Mike Johnson, Virginia Tech (AP-1)
- Mike Durrah, South Carolina (AP-1)
- Ken Roe, Florida State (AP-2)
- James Robinson, Virginia Tech (AP-2)
- Eric Fairs, Memphis (AP-2)

=== Defensive backs ===
- Clint Harris, East Carolina (AP-1)
- Kirk Perry, Louisville (AP-1)
- Bud Brown, Southern Mississippi (AP-1)
- Derek Carter, Virginia Tech (AP-2)
- Kenny Calhoun, Miami (AP-2)
- Rodney Bellinger, Miami (AP-2)
- Jim Roelhele, Louisiana-Lafayette (AP-2)

== Special teams ==
=== Kickers ===
- Tony Wood, Tulane (AP-1)
- Jeff Davis, Miami (AP-2)

=== Punters ===
- Chris Norman, South Carolina (AP-1)
- David Cox, Virginia Tech (AP-2)
