= Louis Lipps =

American football player (born 1962)

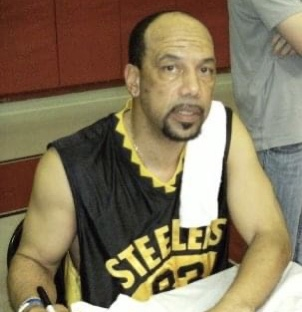
- Lipps at a charity event in 2007

No. 83, 86
- Positions: Wide receiver, return specialist

Personal information
- Born: August 9, 1962 (age 64); New Orleans, Louisiana, U.S.
- Listed height: 5 ft 10 in (1.78 m)
- Listed weight: 190 lb (86 kg)

Career information
- High school: East St. John (Reserve, Louisiana)
- College: Southern Miss
- NFL draft: 1984: 1st round, 23rd overall pick

Career history
- Pittsburgh Steelers (1984–1991); New Orleans Saints (1992); Pittsburgh Steelers (1993)*
- * Offseason or practice squad member only

Awards and highlights
- AP NFL Offensive Rookie of the Year (1984); 2× First-team All-Pro (1984, 1985); 2× Second-team All-Pro (1984, 1985); 2× Pro Bowl (1984, 1985); PFWA All-Rookie Team (1984); Pittsburgh Steelers Hall of Honor; Joe Greene Great Performance Award (1984); First-team All-South Independent (1983); Second-team All-South Independent (1982)

Career NFL statistics
- Receptions: 359
- Receiving yards: 6,019
- Receiving touchdowns: 39
- Stats at Pro Football Reference

Louis Adam Lipps Jr. (born August 9, 1962) is an American former professional football player who was a wide receiver for nine seasons in the National Football League (NFL), spending eight seasons with the Pittsburgh Steelers and one with the New Orleans Saints.

He was selected by the Steelers in the first round of the 1984 NFL draft after a college football career at the Southern Miss Golden Eagles. Lipps also attended East St. John High School in Reserve, Louisiana.

== College career ==
Lipps played college football at the University of Southern Mississippi from 1980 to 1983, where he was a wide receiver and return specialist. During his freshman season in 1980, Lipps recorded 2 receptions for 28 yards, along with 8 punt returns for 54 yards and 3 kick returns for 61 yards. His role expanded in 1981, when he made 9 catches for 181 yards and 1 touchdown, while also returning 7 punts for 31 yards. Lipps had a breakout season in 1982, tallying 38 receptions for 468 yards and 2 touchdowns, along with 2 carries for 10 yards. He also excelled on special teams, returning 23 punts for 280 yards and scoring 1 punt return touchdown. As a senior in 1983, Lipps had his most productive year, recording 42 receptions for 800 yards and 5 touchdowns, along with 6 carries for 52 yards and 1 rushing touchdown. He continued to shine as a return specialist, amassing 40 punt returns for 460 yards.

== NFL career ==
=== Pittsburgh Steelers ===
In the 1984 NFL draft, Lipps was selected by the Pittsburgh Steelers 23rd overall. His teammate John Stallworth took him under his wing when he was a rookie. During his first outing with the Steelers, he caught an 80 yard touchdown pass from David Woodley against the Kansas City Chiefs. He would score another touchdown during the game on a 21 yard pass from Mark Malone, giving him two touchdowns in his professional debut. By the conclusion of his inaugural season, Lipps broke the National Football League record for punt return yardage by a rookie with 656 yards. Lipps returned one punt for a touchdown and also caught 45 passes for 860 receiving yards and 9 receiving touchdowns. He was named the NFL's Offensive Rookie of the Year at season's end and was also named to the AFC team in the Pro Bowl for that year.

Lipps' second season in 1985 saw him go over 1,000 receiving yards with 1,134 and 12 touchdown receptions, all career highs. He was named 1st Team All-Pro by the Newspaper Enterprise Association (NEA) and the Pro Football Writers Association (PFWA) and 2nd Team All-Pro by the Associated Press (AP). He also earned a second straight trip to the Pro Bowl. The Steelers named him the Team's MVP for the 1985 season.

He struggled with injuries during the 1986 season. One of his injuries occurred against the defending Super Bowl champion Chicago Bears, where he took an elbow to the face by Bears linebacker Otis Wilson, causing Lipps to be ruled out for the remainder of the matchup. Across 13 games, Lipps caught 38 passes for 590 yards and three touchdowns. Lipps would be injured for much of the 1987 season. He appeared in only four games and caught 11 passes for 164 yards in what would be his only season in which he did not catch a single touchdown.

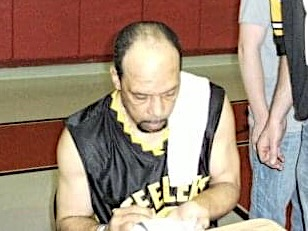
Lipps representing the Steelers at a charity basketball game in 2007

He rebounded in 1988, finishing with 50 catches for 973 receiving yards and 5 touchdown catches including the Steel City Wonder, where he caught a ball in his facemask and scored. In 1989, Lipps again led the team in receptions (50), receiving yards (944) and receiving touchdowns (5) and was named Team MVP for the second time.

Lipps' production began to decline with the team after 1989. In 1990, Lipps would not score a touchdown until Week 6's 34-17 victory over the Denver Broncos. He finished the season appearing in 14 games, managing to catch 50 passes for 682 yards and three touchdowns. In 1991, Lipps caught 55 passes, the second most he had in a single season during his career for 671 yards and two touchdowns. Lipps' 44.7 yards per game made Lipps the team's leader in receiving yards for the 1991 season. After eight years with the Steelers, Lipps was released after the 1991 season.

=== New Orleans Saints ===
With hopes of continuing his NFL career, Lipps signed a two-year deal with his hometown team, the New Orleans Saints, in 1992. Despite the opportunity, his tenure in New Orleans was brief and limited. He appeared in just three games during the 1992 season, recording one reception in total for one yard. Persistent injuries and reduced effectiveness on the field contributed to his decision to retire from professional football following that season.

He retired as a Steeler in 1993. Lipps caught 359 passes for 6031 yards and 39 touchdowns in his career.

== Post-retirement ==
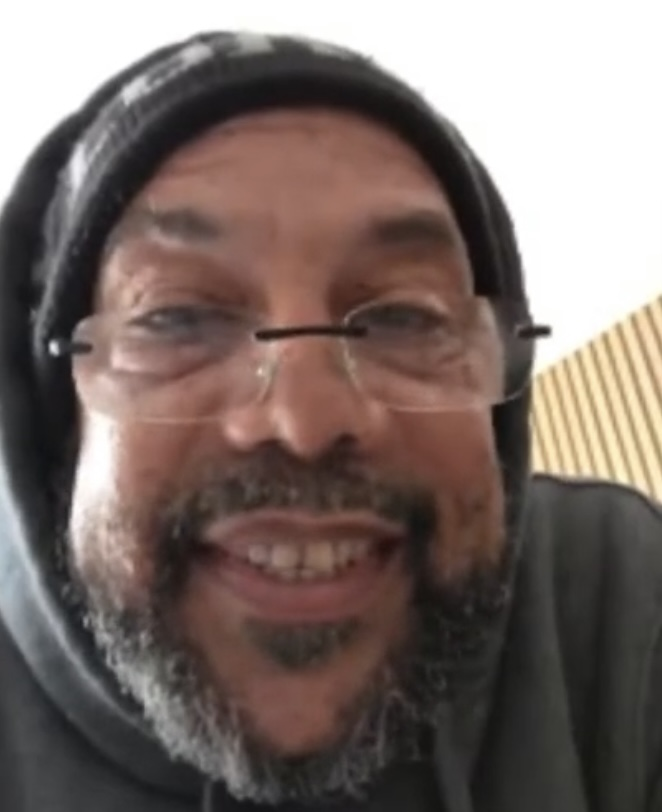
Lipps in 2023

Lipps was inducted into the Steelers Hall of Honor on November 13, 2022, an achievement he described as his personal "Super Bowl." In April 2020, Lipps was named the fifth greatest wide receiver in Steelers history by Sports Illustrated.

== Personal life ==
Lipps married his wife, Toni Seawright, a former Miss Mississippi beauty queen on June 10, 1989 in Moss Point, Mississippi.

On November 6, 2021, Lipps was arrested after his vehicle collided with a parked trailer on Ruth Street in Pittsburgh. According to the police report, his blood alcohol content was measured at .235%, nearly three times the legal limit. Witnesses reported that Lipps appeared unaware his truck had hit the trailer. Police noted that Lipps exhibited signs of intoxication, including bloodshot eyes and difficulty maintaining balance. He reportedly declined to complete a field sobriety test, allegedly stating, "I'm going to fail, so no." Lipps and his wife, who was present in the vehicle, were taken into custody.

On February 11, 2022, Lipps entered an Accelerated Rehabilitative Disposition (ARD) program as part of a resolution to the case. The program requires him to serve 12 months of probation, complete a safe driving course, and undergo a 60-day driver's license suspension.

== NFL career statistics ==
Legend
**Bold**	Career high

=== Regular season ===
Year	Team	Games		Receiving				
Year	Team	GP	GS	Rec	Yds	Avg	Lng	TD
1984	PIT	14	8	45	860	19.1	80	9
1985	PIT	**16**	**16**	**59**	**1,134**	19.2	51	**12**
1986	PIT	13	12	38	590	15.5	48	3
1987	PIT	4	2	11	164	14.9	27	0
1988	PIT	**16**	**16**	50	973	**19.5**	**89**	5
1989	PIT	**16**	**16**	50	944	18.9	79	5
1990	PIT	14	14	50	682	13.6	37	3
1991	PIT	15	14	55	671	12.2	35	2
1992	NOR	2	0	1	1	1.0	1	0
Career		110	98	359	6,019	16.8	89	39

=== Playoffs ===
Year	Team	Games		Receiving				
Year	Team	GP	GS	Rec	Yds	Avg	Lng	TD
1984	PIT	**2**	**2**	**8**	**131**	**16.4**	**33**	**1**
1989	PIT	**2**	**2**	6	53	8.8	11	**1**
Career		4	4	14	184	13.1	33	2
