= Don Bailey (American football) =

American football player (born 1961)

No. 61
- Position: Center

Personal information
- Born: March 24, 1961 (age 65); Miami, Florida, U.S.
- Listed height: 6 ft 4 in (1.93 m)
- Listed weight: 264 lb (120 kg)

Career information
- High school: Hialeah-Miami (Hialeah, Florida)
- College: Miami (FL)
- NFL draft: 1983: 11th round, 283rd overall pick

Career history
- Denver Broncos (1983)*; Tampa Bay Buccaneers (1983)*; Indianapolis Colts (1984–1985)
- * Offseason or practice squad member only

Career NFL statistics
- Games played: 20
- Fumble recoveries: 1
- Stats at Pro Football Reference

William Donald Bailey (born March 24, 1961) is an American former professional football player who was a center for the Indianapolis Colts of the National Football League (NFL) from 1984 to 1985. He was selected by the Denver Broncos in the 11th round (283rd overall) of the 1983 NFL draft.

He played college football for the Miami Hurricanes, earning second-team All-South Independent honors in 1982.
