= Frank Pollard =

American football player (born 1957)

No. 44, 30
- Position: Running back

Personal information
- Born: June 15, 1957 (age 69); Clifton, Texas, U.S.
- Listed height: 5 ft 10 in (1.78 m)
- Listed weight: 218 lb (99 kg)

Career information
- High school: Meridian (Meridian, Texas)
- College: Baylor
- NFL draft: 1980: 11th round, 305th overall pick

Career history
- Pittsburgh Steelers (1980–1988)

Career NFL statistics
- Rushing yards: 3,989
- Rushing average: 4.2
- Touchdowns: 20
- Stats at Pro Football Reference

Frank Pollard (born June 15, 1957) is an American former professional football player who was a running back for nine seasons for the Pittsburgh Steelers of the National Football League (NFL). He played college football for the Baylor Bears.

He is noted for his record-setting performance at the 1976 Texas state high school track championships. The "Faces In The Crowd" article in the June 14, 1976 issue of Sports Illustrated stated:

Frank Pollard Jr., 19, a senior at Meridian High, a class B school, became the highest scorer in the history of the Texas track meet, winning the discus (154'9"), the shot (56'3"), the 100 (9.9) and the 220 (21.8). His sprint-relay team also placed fourth.

In Bleacher Report's list of the "Top 100 Pittsburgh Steelers in NFL History", he placed 97th.

Currently, Mr. Pollard works at the Methodist Children's Home in Waco, Texas, where he helps children and young adults in their development.

== NFL career statistics ==
Legend
| **Bold** | Career high |

=== Regular season ===
| Year | Team | Games | | Rushing | | | | | Receiving | | | | |
| Year | Team | GP | GS | Att | Yds | Avg | Lng | TD | Rec | Yds | Avg | Lng | TD |
|---|---|---|---|---|---|---|---|---|---|---|---|---|---|
| 1980 | PIT | **16** | 0 | 4 | 16 | 4.0 | 12 | 0 | 0 | 0 | 0.0 | 0 | 0 |
| 1981 | PIT | 14 | 10 | 123 | 570 | **4.6** | 29 | 2 | 19 | 156 | 8.2 | **26** | 0 |
| 1982 | PIT | 9 | 8 | 62 | 238 | 3.8 | 18 | 2 | 6 | 39 | 6.5 | 11 | 0 |
| 1983 | PIT | **16** | 3 | 135 | 608 | 4.5 | 32 | 4 | 16 | 127 | 7.9 | 17 | 0 |
| 1984 | PIT | 15 | 15 | 213 | 851 | 4.0 | 52 | **6** | 21 | 186 | 8.9 | 18 | 0 |
| 1985 | PIT | **16** | **16** | **233** | **991** | 4.3 | **56** | 3 | **24** | **250** | 10.4 | 20 | 0 |
| 1986 | PIT | 3 | 3 | 24 | 86 | 3.6 | 12 | 0 | 2 | 15 | 7.5 | 10 | 0 |
| 1987 | PIT | 12 | 7 | 128 | 536 | 4.2 | 33 | 3 | 14 | 77 | 5.5 | 17 | 0 |
| 1988 | PIT | 10 | 3 | 31 | 93 | 3.0 | 7 | 0 | 2 | 22 | **11.0** | 19 | 0 |
| | | 111 | 65 | 953 | 3,989 | 4.2 | 56 | 20 | 104 | 872 | 8.4 | 26 | 0 |

=== Playoffs ===
| Year | Team | Games | | Rushing | | | | | Receiving | | | | |
| Year | Team | GP | GS | Att | Yds | Avg | Lng | TD | Rec | Yds | Avg | Lng | TD |
|---|---|---|---|---|---|---|---|---|---|---|---|---|---|
| 1982 | PIT | 1 | 1 | 9 | 47 | 5.2 | 18 | 0 | 2 | 29 | **14.5** | **20** | 0 |
| 1983 | PIT | 1 | 1 | 9 | 37 | 4.1 | 15 | 0 | 0 | 0 | 0.0 | 0 | 0 |
| 1984 | PIT | **2** | **2** | **27** | **147** | **5.4** | **23** | **2** | **7** | **61** | 8.7 | 17 | 0 |
| | | 4 | 4 | 45 | 231 | 5.1 | 23 | 2 | 9 | 90 | 10.0 | 20 | 0 |
