= El Cajon Valley High School =

Coordinates: 32°47′57.5″N 116°56′50.42″W

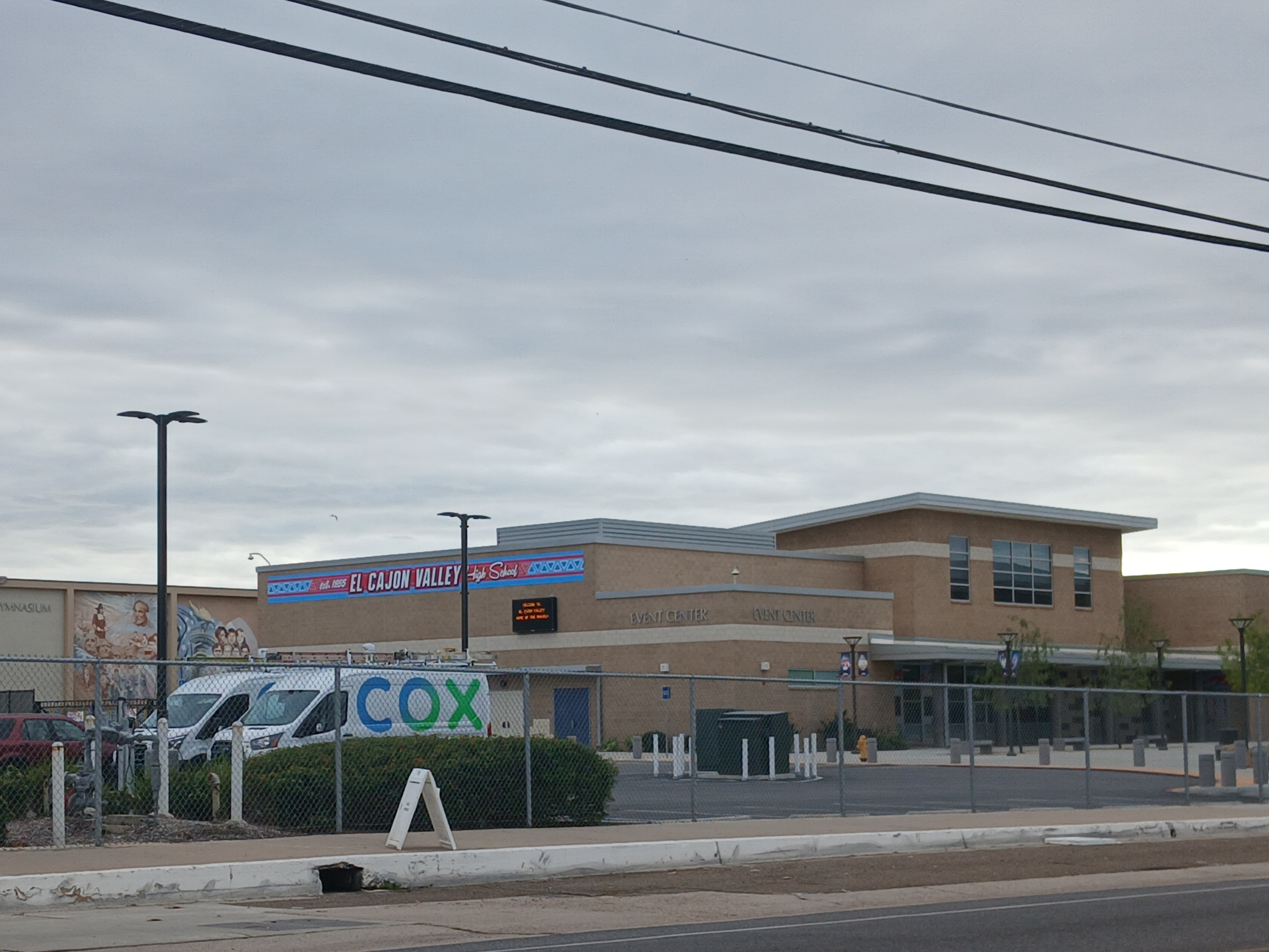
- El Cajon Valley High School in 2025

Location
- 1035 East Madison Avenue; El Cajon, California; United States

Information
- Type: Public High School
- Motto: "Be Brave"
- Established: 1955
- School district: Grossmont Union High School District
- Principal: Robert Stirling
- Teaching staff: 15.07 (FTE)
- Grades: 9 through 12
- Enrollment: 1,672 (2023-2024)
- Student to teacher ratio: 110.95
- Campus type: Urban
- Colors: Red and Columbia blue
- Mascot: The Brave (young Native American warrior)
- Rival: Granite Hills High School
- Yearbook: Legend
- Nickname: Braves
- Website: braves.guhsd.net

El Cajon Valley High School (ECVHS) is a comprehensive public secondary school in El Cajon, California. It serves students in grades 9-12. Established in 1955, El Cajon Valley is the third of twelve high schools to be built in Grossmont Union High School District. ECVHS students and athletic teams are known as the Braves. The school is accredited by the Western Association of Schools and Colleges (WASC).

== Extracurricular activities ==
Athletics

El Cajon Valley's athletic teams, the Braves, compete in the Valley League of the Grossmont Conference, under the CIF San Diego Section.

The school fields teams in baseball, basketball, cross country, field hockey, football, gymnastics, soccer, softball, swimming, boys tennis, girls tennis, track & field, boys volleyball, girls volleyball, boys water polo, girls water polo, and wrestling.

Additional extracurricular activities can be found on the El Cajon Valley High School website

== Notable alumni ==
- Lester Bangs (music critic).
- Sonny Bishop, former professional football player
- Bob Christian, Former professional baseball player (Detroit Tigers, Chicago White Sox)
- Mike Davis (Marxist historian)
- Mike Hartley, Former professional baseball player (Los Angeles Dodgers, Philadelphia Phillies, Minnesota Twins, Boston Red Sox, Baltimore Orioles)
- Joe Kennedy, Former professional baseball player (Tampa Bay Rays, Colorado Rockies, Oakland Athletics, Arizona Diamondbacks, Toronto Blue Jays)
- Mark Malone, Former professional football player (Arizona State, Pittsburgh Steelers, San Diego Chargers)
- James Wong, Writer/Director of Final Destination film series.

== Gallery ==
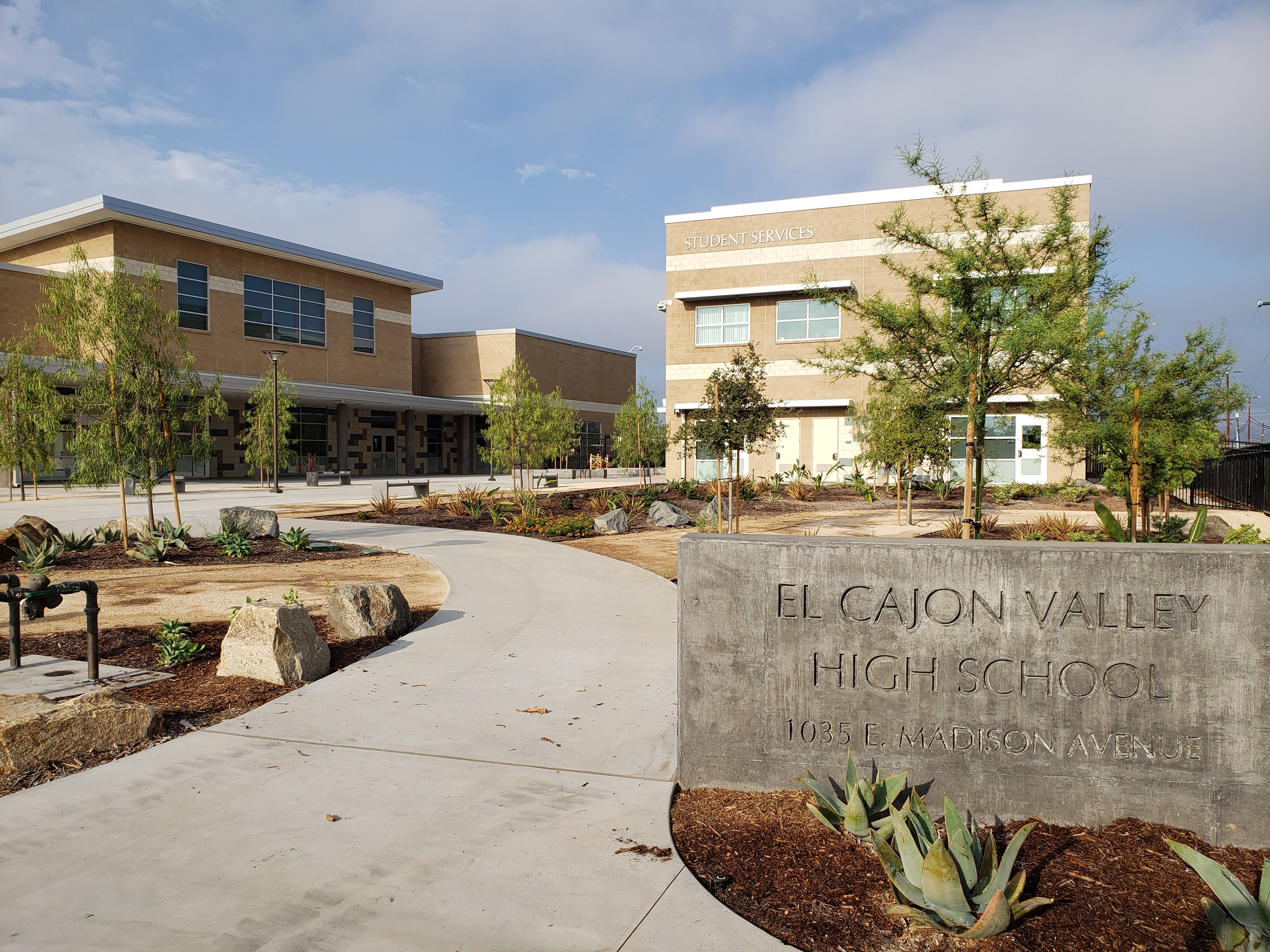
Front Entrance

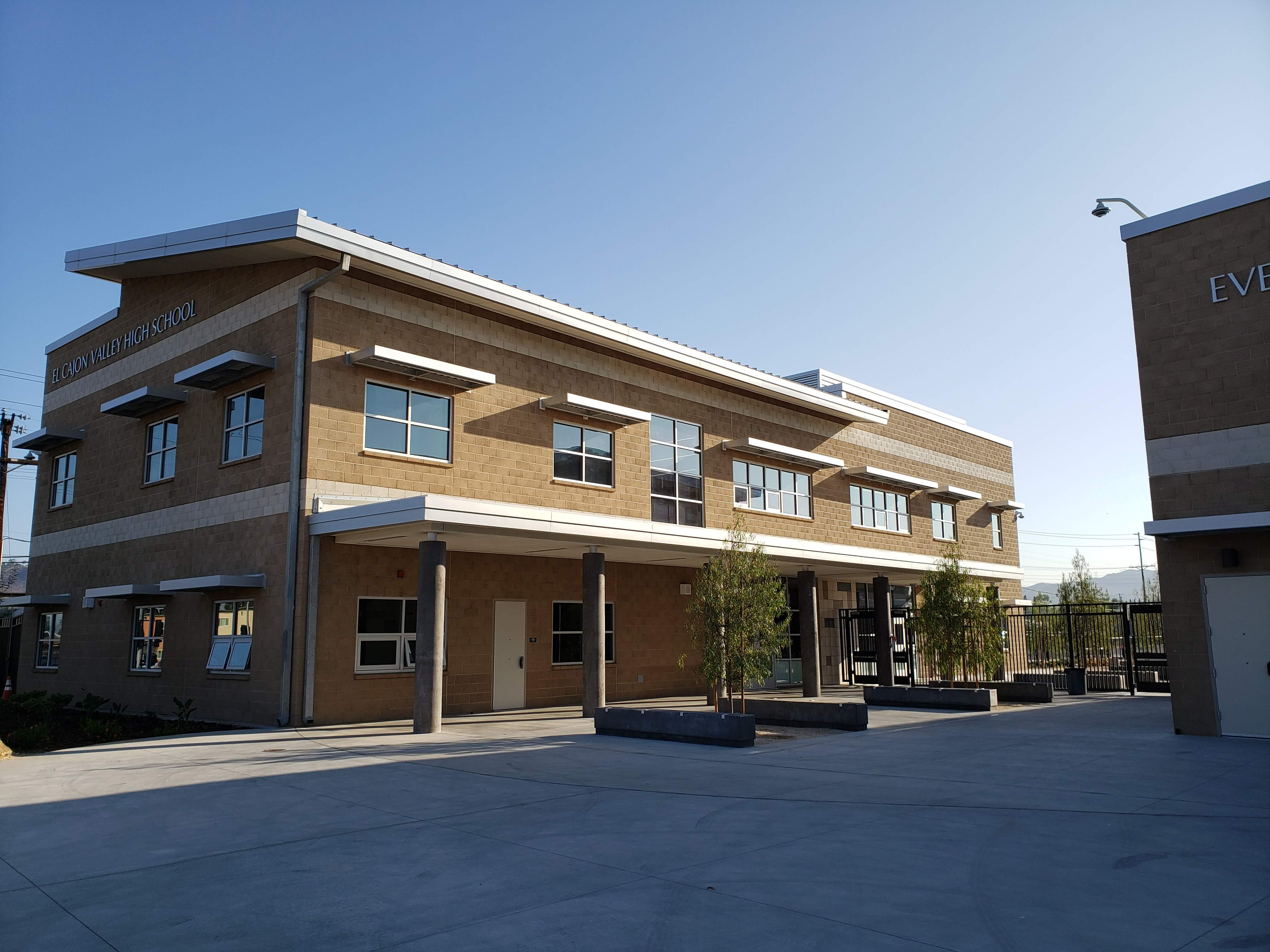
Student Services Building

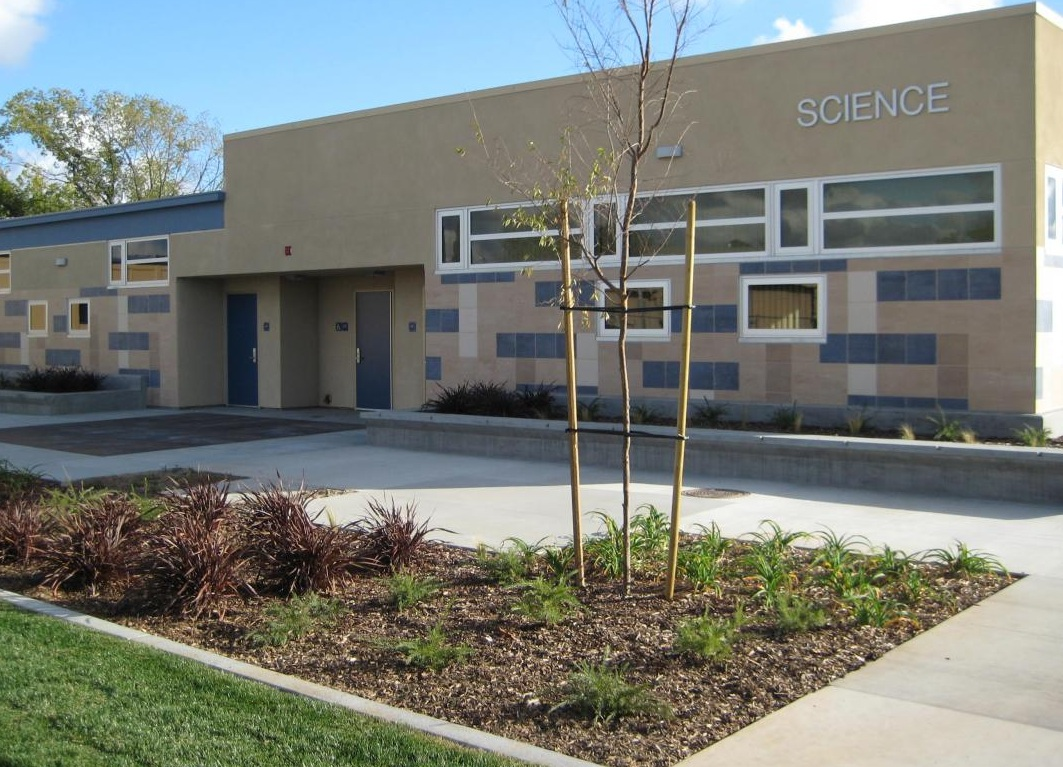
Science building

== See also ==
- List of high schools in San Diego County, California
- List of high schools in California
