= Kevin Ingram (quarterback) =

American football player (born 1962)

No. 12
- Position: Quarterback

Personal information
- Born: April 26, 1962 (age 64); Philadelphia, Pennsylvania, U.S.
- Listed height: 6 ft 0 in (1.83 m)
- Listed weight: 178 lb (81 kg)

Career information
- College: East Carolina
- NFL draft: 1984: undrafted

Career history
- Edmonton Eskimos (1984); New Orleans Saints (1987)
- Stats at Pro Football Reference

Kevin Ingram (born April 26, 1962) is an American former professional football player who was a quarterback for the New Orleans Saints of the National Football League (NFL). He played college football for the East Carolina Pirates. He also played in the Canadian Football League for the Edmonton Eskimos.

- Second-team All-South Independent (1983)
