= 1982 All-South Independent football team =

American college football season

The 1982 All-South Independent football team consists of American football players chosen by the Associated Press for their All-South independent teams for the 1982 NCAA Division I-A football season.

== Offense ==
Quarterback

- Reggie Collier, Southern Mississippi (AP-1)
- Dean May, Louisville (AP-2)

Running backs

- Sam DeJarnette, Southern Mississippi (AP-1)
- Greg Allen, Florida State (AP-1)
- Ricky Williams, Florida State (AP-2)
- Mark Rush, Miami (AP-2)

Wide receivers

- Robert Griffin, Tulane (AP-1)
- Mark Clayton, Louisville (AP-1)
- Jessie Hester, Florida State (AP-2)
- Rocky Belk, Miami (AP-2)
- Louis Lipps, Southern Mississippi (AP-2)

Tight end

- Glenn Dennison, Miami (AP-1)
- Mike Shaw, Virginia Tech (AP-2)

Offensive tackles

- Wally Browne, Virginia Tech (AP-1)
- Glen Howe, Southern Mississippi (AP-1)
- Mark Cooper, Miami (AP-2)
- John Robertson, East Carolina (AP-2)

Offensive guards

- Jim Boyle, Tulane (AP-1)
- Terry Long, East Carolina (AP-1)
- Mike Moore, Miami (AP-2)
- Ricky Render, Florida State (AP-2)

Center

- Tom McCormick, Florida State (AP-1)
- Don Bailey, Miami (AP-2)

== Defense ==
Defensive ends

- Jody Schulz, East Carolina (AP-1)
- George Tillman, Southern Mississippi (AP-1)
- David Marvel, Virginia Tech (AP-2)
- Andy Martin, Louisiana-Lafayette (AP-2)

Defensive tackles

- Tony Chickillo, Miami (AP-1)
- Andrew Provence, South Carolina (AP-1)
- Jearld Baylis, Southern Mississippi (AP-1)
- Alphonso Carreker, Florida State (AP-1)
- Bruce Smith, Virginia Tech (AP-2)
- Pedro Phillips, Virginia Tech (AP-2)
- Steve Hamilton, East Carolina (AP-2)

Linebackers

- Tommy Young, Florida State (AP-1)
- Jay Brophy, Miami (AP-1)
- Mike Johnson, Virginia Tech (AP-1)
- Ken Rowe, Florida State (AP-2)
- Johnny Walker, Memphis (AP-2)
- Anthony Williams, Louisville (AP-2)

Defensive backs

- Jamie Boone, Miami (AP-1)
- Harvey Clayton, Florida State (AP-1)
- Clint Harris, East Carolina (AP-1)
- Larry Harris, Florida State (AP-2)
- Frank Minnifield, Louisville (AP-2)
- Bud Brown, Southern Mississippi (AP-2)

== Special teams ==
Kicker

- Mark Fleetwood, South Carolina (AP-1)
- Jeff Heath, East Carolina (AP-2)

Punter

- Vince Manalla, Tulane (AP-1)
- Greg Labelle, Miami (AP-2)
