= Weegie Thompson =

American football player (born 1961)

No. 87
- Position: Wide receiver

Personal information
- Born: March 21, 1961 (age 65); Pensacola, Florida, U.S.
- Listed height: 6 ft 6 in (1.98 m)
- Listed weight: 212 lb (96 kg)

Career information
- High school: Midlothian (Midlothian, Virginia)
- College: Florida State
- NFL draft: 1984: 4th round, 108th overall pick

Career history
- Pittsburgh Steelers (1984–1989)

Career NFL statistics
- Receptions: 79
- Receiving yards: 1,377
- Touchdowns: 11
- Stats at Pro Football Reference

Willis Hope "Weegie" Thompson (born March 21, 1961) is an American former professional football player who was a wide receiver for six seasons for the Pittsburgh Steelers of the National Football League (NFL). He played high school football for Midlothian High School in Richmond, Virginia. He was recruited by Florida State University as a quarterback.

== College statistics ==
- 1981: 2 catches for 73 yards.
- 1982: 8 catches for 136 yards and 2 TD.
- 1983: 31 catches for 502 yards and 3 TD.
  - Second-team All-South Independent (1983)

== Professional career ==
Thompson was selected in the fourth round of the 1984 NFL draft by the Pittsburgh Steelers. Hall of Fame safety Ronnie Lott gushes when he talks about Thompson. In Thompson's rookie season, 1984, the Steelers were the only team to beat the 49ers. One reason they did was by assigning Thompson to block Lott on every play. "He blocked my butt all day -- and fair," Lott remembered. "Every play, he came after me. And I respect the hell out of Weegie Thompson to this day. He's one of the toughest guys I ever played against."

== NFL career statistics ==
Legend
**Bold**	Career high

=== Regular season ===
Year	Team	Games		Receiving				
Year	Team	GP	GS	Rec	Yds	Avg	Lng	TD
1984	PIT	**16**	7	**17**	291	17.1	59	3
1985	PIT	**16**	0	8	138	17.3	42	1
1986	PIT	**16**	4	**17**	191	11.2	20	**5**
1987	PIT	12	3	**17**	313	18.4	**63**	1
1988	PIT	**16**	**11**	16	**370**	**23.1**	50	1
1989	PIT	**16**	0	4	74	18.5	28	0
Career		92	25	79	1,377	17.4	63	11

=== Playoffs ===
Year	Team	Games		Receiving				
Year	Team	GP	GS	Rec	Yds	Avg	Lng	TD
1984	PIT	**2**	0	**1**	15	15.0	15	0
1989	PIT	**2**	**1**	**1**	**23**	**23.0**	**23**	0
Career		4	1	2	38	19.0	23	0

== Personal ==
Thompson is called Weegie because his Father, Willis Sr., was nicknamed Weegie when his younger brother couldn't pronounce Willis. It came out Weegie. So, Weegie is Weegie Jr. (Willis).

After his playing days, Thompson took a position with Chambers Development before moving on to work as a salesman with Waste Management in Midlothian, Virginia.
