= Chris Kolodziejski =

German gridiron football player (born 1961)

No. 84
- Position: Tight end

Personal information
- Born: February 5, 1961 (age 65); Augsburg, Germany
- Listed height: 6 ft 3 in (1.91 m)
- Listed weight: 231 lb (105 kg)

Career information
- High school: Santa Monica (Santa Monica, California, U.S.)
- College: Wyoming
- NFL draft: 1984: 2nd round, 52nd overall pick

Career history
- Pittsburgh Steelers (1984)

Career NFL statistics
- Receptions: 5
- Receiving yards: 59
- Stats at Pro Football Reference

Christopher James Kolodziejski (born February 5, 1961) is a former American football tight end in the National Football League (NFL) who played for the Pittsburgh Steelers. He played college football for the Wyoming Cowboys. He was selected by the Steelers in the second round of the 1984 NFL draft with the 52nd overall pick. In his lone season in the NFL, he had five receptions for 59 yards in the 1984 season.
