= Jeff Markland =

American football player (born 1965)

No. 88
- Position: Tight end

Personal information
- Born: November 16, 1965 (age 60); Los Angeles, California, U.S.
- Listed height: 6 ft 3 in (1.91 m)
- Listed weight: 245 lb (111 kg)

Career information
- High school: John Burroughs
- College: Illinois
- NFL draft: 1988: undrafted

Career history
- Pittsburgh Steelers (1988); Miami Dolphins (1989)*
- * Offseason or practice squad member only
- Stats at Pro Football Reference

Jeffrey Stuart Markland (born November 16, 1965) is an American former professional football tight end who played for the Pittsburgh Steelers of the National Football League (NFL). He played college football at Los Angeles Pierce College and the University of Illinois.
