= Jay Brophy =

American football player (born 1960)

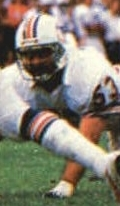
- Brophy pictured in a defensive play for the Dolphins in the 1985-86 AFC Championship game

No. 53, 90
- Position: Linebacker

Personal information
- Born: July 27, 1960 (age 66); Akron, Ohio, U.S.
- Listed height: 6 ft 3 in (1.91 m)
- Listed weight: 233 lb (106 kg)

Career information
- High school: Buchtel (Akron)
- College: Miami (FL)
- NFL draft: 1984: 2nd round, 53rd overall pick

Career history
- Miami Dolphins (1984–1986); New York Jets (1987); Tampa Bay Buccaneers (1988)*
- * Offseason or practice squad member only

Awards and highlights
- National champion (1983); First-team All-American (1983); First-team All-South Independent (1982)

Career NFL statistics
- Sacks: 2
- Interceptions: 1
- Fumble recoveries: 1
- Stats at Pro Football Reference

James Jay Brophy (born July 27, 1960) is an American former professional football player who was a linebacker in the National Football League (NFL).

== Early life ==
Born and raised in Akron, Ohio, Brophy played scholastically at John R. Buchtel High School, where he was a letterman in football and basketball. He played collegiately for the Miami Hurricanes, As a senior, he was a member of their consensus national champion squad, and was honored by Football News as a first-team All-American.

== Professional career ==
Brophy was selected by the Miami Dolphins in the second round of the 1984 NFL draft. He spent three years with the Dolphins, appearing in 31 games, with 11 starts. In 1987 he joined the New York Jets as a replacement player during the NFLPA strike. For his career he collected two sacks, one interception (which he returned 41 yards), and one fumble recovery.

Brophy signed with the Tampa Bay Buccaneers in February 1988. He retired in June 1988.

== High school coaching ==
After the NFL, Brophy went on to coach high school football. He was the head coach at St. Vincent–St. Mary in Akron in the early-2000s, where his star player was future NBA Hall-of-Famer LeBron James. As of 2022, he was head coach of the Manchester High School football team in New Franklin, Ohio.
