= Mark Catano =

American football player (born 1962)

No. 78, 68
- Position: Nose tackle

Personal information
- Born: January 26, 1962 (age 64); Yonkers, New York, U.S.
- Listed height: 6 ft 3 in (1.91 m)
- Listed weight: 235 lb (107 kg)

Career information
- High school: Hendrick Hudson (NY)
- College: Valdosta State
- NFL draft: 1984: undrafted

Career history
- Pittsburgh Steelers (1984–1985); Cleveland Browns (1986)*; Buffalo Bills (1986); Indianapolis Colts (1987)*; Detroit Lions (1987)*
- * Offseason or practice squad member only

Career NFL statistics
- Sacks: 3
- Fumble recoveries: 1
- Stats at Pro Football Reference

Mark R. Catano (born January 26, 1962) is an American former professional football player who was a nose tackle for three seasons with the Pittsburgh Steelers and Buffalo Bills of the National Football League (NFL). He played college football for the Valdosta State Blazers.
