= Terry Long (American football) =

American football player (1959–2005)

No. 74
- Position: Guard

Personal information
- Born: July 21, 1959; Columbia, South Carolina, U.S.
- Died: June 7, 2005 (aged 45); Pittsburgh, Pennsylvania, U.S.
- Listed height: 5 ft 11 in (1.80 m)
- Listed weight: 272 lb (123 kg)

Career information
- High school: Eau Claire (Columbia)
- College: East Carolina
- NFL draft: 1984: 4th round, 111th overall pick

Career history
- Pittsburgh Steelers (1984–1991)

Awards and highlights
- Consensus All-American (1983); First-team All-South Independent (1982)

Career NFL statistics
- Games Played: 105
- Games Started: 89
- Fumble recoveries: 3
- Stats at Pro Football Reference

Terry Luther Long (July 21, 1959 – June 7, 2005) was an American professional football player who was an offensive lineman for eight seasons with the Pittsburgh Steelers of the National Football League (NFL) during the 1980s and early 1990s. He played college football for the East Carolina Pirates, earning consensus All-American honors in 1983. He was selected by the Steelers in the fourth round of the 1984 NFL draft.

== Early life ==
Long was born in Columbia, South Carolina, to Levane Pickney and Robert Luther Long. He attended Eau Claire High School and graduated in 1977. In one of his early jobs at the age of 14, he worked as a brick layer. After high school, he enlisted in the U.S. Army, joined the Army's 82nd Airborne Division, and made more than 60 parachute jumps. He also played football while stationed at Fort Bragg.

Long was recruited from the military to play football for Columbia Junior College. While there, he studied for his degree in Business Administration.

== College career ==
Long transferred to East Carolina University, where he played for the Pirates from 1980 to 1983. He was recognized as a consensus first-team All-American in 1983. While at college, Long was a four-year starter. In 1983, to prove his strength to NFL teams, Long competed in a powerlifting meet for the first and only time and totalled an incredible 2149.3 pounds, including a near-world record 865.3 pound deadlift; this was more than anyone lifted in that year's Powerlifting World Championships.

== Professional career ==
The Pittsburgh Steelers selected Long in the fourth round (111th pick overall) of the 1984 NFL draft, and he played for the Steelers from 1984 to 1991. During his eight NFL seasons, he played in 105 games, and started 89 of them. Long recorded three fumble recoveries and even returned a kick off during a game in 1984. As a rookie in 1984, Long started seven games, as the Steelers finished 9–7, winning the AFC Central, despite an unstable quarterback situation, with former first round selection Mark Malone and former Dolphins starter David Woodley splitting the starting duties. The next season the Steelers dipped to 7–9, and the quarterback situation did not improve, as both Malone and Woodley struggled, leading to second year pro Scott Campbell getting two starts at quarterback. That year Long played in 15 games and started 14 of them. In 1986, Long started all 16 games, but the Steelers were not winners on the field, falling to a record of 6–10. Malone continued to struggle and so did rookie Bubby Brister. Despite the ineffective quarterback play, Long had one of his best seasons. In the 1987 NFL strike Long did not cross the picket line when the players went on strike.

In 1989, he only started in nine games, though he'd start in all 16 the following season. In 1991, his final season, he only started three games and dressed for eight.

== Legal troubles ==
In the days leading up to his death, Long was facing a plethora of legal issues. Long had been indicted in March 2005 for arson and fraud charges from a fire that destroyed his chicken processing business. The fire occurred the same day he filed for Chapter 11 Bankruptcy Protection in 2003. Though investigators quickly figured out the fire was set intentionally, it took further investigation to learn of the financial reasons behind the fire. In addition to the charges stemming from the fire, Long also faced charges regarding loans he had received from the state that were supposed to be used to purchase processing equipment for his company. On top of the charges he was facing, his home was also in foreclosure proceedings.

Long had already had troubles with the law after the July 1991 incident in which he brandished a gun when Steelers coach Chuck Noll informed him that he was being suspended by the NFL for failing a test for steroids.

== Death ==
Long died on June 7, 2005. It was determined that he had consumed a full gallon of antifreeze, which was ruled a suicide. An autopsy by neuropathologist Bennet Omalu revealed that Long had chronic traumatic encephalopathy (CTE), a degenerative disease caused by repeated hits to the head during his football career. Long is one of at least 345 NFL players to be diagnosed after death with this disease. He had previously attempted suicide in 1991, after testing positive for steroids.

Long was buried at the Swansea Methodist Church Cemetery in Swansea, South Carolina. One week before he died, Long approached the minister of his church, and asked if he could speak to the churchgoers about his legal issues that were about to make headlines.

Long’s suicide by drinking antifreeze was referenced in a suicide note carried by mass shooter Shane Tamura, who also had CTE.
