= Alphonso Carreker =

American football player (born 1962)

No. 76, 92
- Position: Defensive end

Personal information
- Born: May 25, 1962 (age 64); Columbus, Ohio, U.S.
- Listed height: 6 ft 6 in (1.98 m)
- Listed weight: 268 lb (122 kg)

Career information
- High school: Marion-Franklin (Columbus)
- College: Florida State
- NFL draft: 1984: 1st round, 12th overall pick

Career history
- Green Bay Packers (1984–1988); Denver Broncos (1989–1991)

Awards and highlights
- Third-team All-American (1983); First-team All-South Independent (1982); PFWA All-Rookie Team (1984)

Career NFL statistics
- Sacks: 24
- Interceptions: 1
- Fumble recoveries: 3
- Stats at Pro Football Reference

Alphonso Carreker (born May 25, 1962) is an American former professional football player who was a defensive end for seven seasons in the National Football League (NFL) for the Green Bay Packers and Denver Broncos.

Born and raised in Columbus, Ohio, Carreker attended Marion-Franklin High School. He played college football for the Florida State Seminoles, where, as a senior, he was honored by Football News as a third-team All-American.

Carreker was selected by the Packers in the first round (12th overall) of the 1984 NFL draft. He spent five seasons with the Packers, starting 63 games, recording 18.5 sacks, 1 interception, and 3 fumble recoveries.

Following the 1988 season, Carreker signed with the Broncos as a "Plan B" free agent. He started all 16 games in 1989, recording 5.5 sacks. He started in Super Bowl XXIV for the Broncos, recording one sack and one tackle in the 55–10 loss to the San Francisco 49ers.

Carreker retired after the 1991 season, following a seven-year NFL career, having played in 94 games with 80 as a starter.
