= Jerry Reese (defensive lineman) =

American football player (born 1964)

No. 64, 92
- Positions: Defensive end, nose tackle

Personal information
- Born: July 11, 1964 (age 62); Hopkinsville, Kentucky, U.S.
- Listed height: 6 ft 2 in (1.88 m)
- Listed weight: 267 lb (121 kg)

Career information
- College: Kentucky
- NFL draft: 1988: 5th round, 128th overall pick

Career history
- Pittsburgh Steelers (1988); Houston Oilers (1990)*; Barcelona Dragons (1991-1992)
- * Offseason or practice squad member only

Awards and highlights
- Second-team All-SEC (1987)

Career NFL statistics
- Sacks: 1
- Stats at Pro Football Reference

Jerry Reese (born July 11, 1964) is an American former professional football player who was a defensive lineman in the National Football League (NFL) and the World League of American Football (WLAF). He played for the Pittsburgh Steelers of the NFL, and the Barcelona Dragons of the WLAF. He was selected by the Steelers in the fifth round of the 1988 NFL draft. Reese played collegiately at the University of Kentucky.
