= Scoop Gillespie =

American football player (1962–2004)

No. 26
- Position: Running back

Personal information
- Born: February 26, 1962; St. Louis, Missouri, U.S.
- Died: May 24, 2004 (aged 42); St. Louis, Missouri, U.S.
- Listed height: 5 ft 10 in (1.78 m)
- Listed weight: 185 lb (84 kg)

Career information
- High school: Southwest (St. Louis)
- College: William Jewell
- NFL draft: 1984: 12th round, 332nd overall pick

Career history
- Pittsburgh Steelers (1984)

Career NFL statistics
- Rushing yards: 18
- Rushing average: 2.6
- Receptions: 1
- Receiving yards: 12
- Stats at Pro Football Reference

Fernandars "Scoop" Gillespie (February 26, 1962 – May 24, 2004) was an American professional football running back. He played for the Pittsburgh Steelers in 1984.
