= David Woodley =

American football player (1958–2003)

No. 16, 19
- Position: Quarterback

Personal information
- Born: October 25, 1958; Shreveport, Louisiana, U.S.
- Died: May 4, 2003 (aged 44); Shreveport, Louisiana, U.S.
- Listed height: 6 ft 2 in (1.88 m)
- Listed weight: 204 lb (93 kg)

Career information
- High school: C. E. Byrd (Shreveport)
- College: LSU (1976–1979)
- NFL draft: 1980: 8th round, 214th overall pick

Career history
- Miami Dolphins (1980–1983); Pittsburgh Steelers (1984–1986); Green Bay Packers (1987)*
- * Offseason or practice squad member only

Awards and highlights
- PFWA All-Rookie Team (1980)

Career NFL statistics
- Passing attempts: 1,300
- Passing completions: 687
- Completion percentage: 52.8%
- TD–INT: 48–63
- Passing yards: 8,558
- Passer rating: 65.7
- Stats at Pro Football Reference

David Eugene Woodley (October 25, 1958 – May 4, 2003) was an American professional football player who was a quarterback in the National Football League (NFL) for the Miami Dolphins (1980–1983), and the Pittsburgh Steelers (1984–1985). He played college football for the LSU Tigers.

== Early life ==
Born and raised in Shreveport, Louisiana, Woodley was the fifth of seven children of attorney John Woodley and Hazel (Iles) Woodley. He was a three-year starter and all-state quarterback for Byrd High School in Shreveport and graduated in 1976. Woodley played college football at LSU in Baton Rouge under longtime head coach Charlie McClendon, sharing playing time with the more popular Steve Ensminger of Baton Rouge.

In his final college game as a senior in December 1979, he led the Tigers to a 34–10 victory over Wake Forest University in the Tangerine Bowl and was named the game's Most Valuable Player; LSU finished the season at 7–5.

== Professional career ==
=== Miami Dolphins ===
As quarterback for the Miami Dolphins, Woodley is best known as the bridge between the eras of hall of famers Bob Griese and Dan Marino. Despite being an eighth-round selection in the 1980 NFL draft and initially fourth on the depth chart, he was elected the team MVP for his rookie season in 1980. That year, he set the Dolphins' team record for most pass completions (176) for a rookie quarterback, later broken by Ryan Tannehill in 2012. In 1982, he became one of the few NFL players to score touchdowns passing, running and receiving in an NFL season. Woodley at one point split time with backup Don Strock so evenly that the quarterback tandem was often referred to as "WoodStrock". Woodley started for the Dolphins in the 1981 playoff game versus the San Diego Chargers. After Miami fell behind 24–0, Strock led the Dolphins back into the game, though the Chargers ultimately won in overtime.

In the strike-shortened 1982 Miami Dolphins season, Woodley handled the lion's share of the time at quarterback en route to Miami winning the American Football Conference title. The Dolphins went on to face the Washington Redskins in Super Bowl XVII. At 24 years and three months of age, he was the youngest quarterback to start a Super Bowl at the time. Despite starting the game well with a 76-yard touchdown pass to Jimmy Cefalo, Woodley and the entire offense then struggled, with no completions in eight attempts in the second half, and he was benched in favor of Strock in the fourth quarter. The Redskins won, 27–17.

Woodley began the 1983 Miami Dolphins season as Miami's starting quarterback, but the Dolphins' offense continued to underperform. The ongoing struggles prompted coach Don Shula to insert Marino, then a rookie, into the lineup midway through a 17–7 road loss to the New Orleans Saints in week five. By the next week, Marino was named the starter for the remainder of the season.

=== Pittsburgh Steelers ===
The Pittsburgh Steelers acquired Woodley in February 1984 by trading a third-round draft pick to Miami. He would compete with Mark Malone for his new team's starting quarterback job, as elbow problems had forced Terry Bradshaw to retire and Cliff Stoudt had left for the USFL. Infamously, this came after the Steelers passed up local native Marino for Gabriel Rivera (who played in six NFL games before a drunk-driving crash left him paralyzed) in the 1983 NFL draft. Woodley split the starting quarterback duty with Malone during both the 1984 and 1985 NFL seasons.

Notified by head coach Chuck Noll that Malone, and not he, would be the starter for the upcoming 1986 season, Woodley abruptly retired in June despite being the Steelers' highest-paid player ($500,000).

In 1987, the Green Bay Packers acquired Woodley from the Steelers for a draft pick, but his stay was short, and his playing career officially ended when he was released in late August.

Woodley is one of two quarterbacks in NFL history, along with Ken Stabler, to have a career winning percentage above .600 while throwing at least 10 more interceptions than touchdowns. Woodley's career record was 34–18–1 (.651), despite throwing 63 interceptions against his 48 career touchdown passes.

== NFL career statistics ==
Legend
**Bold**	Career high

=== Regular season ===
Year	Team	Games			Passing									Rushing					Sacks	
Year	Team	GP	GS	Record	Cmp	Att	Pct	Yds	Y/A	Lng	TD	Int	Rtg	Att	Yds	Avg	Lng	TD	Sck	Yds
1980	MIA	13	11	6–5	176	327	53.8	1,850	5.7	61	**14**	**17**	63.1	55	214	3.9	17	3	17	127
1981	MIA	**15**	**15**	**11–3–1**	**191**	**366**	52.2	**2,470**	6.7	69	12	13	69.8	**63**	**272**	4.3	26	**4**	**24**	**191**
1982	MIA	9	9	7–2	98	179	**54.7**	1,080	6.0	46	5	8	63.5	36	207	**5.8**	**29**	2	10	82
1983	MIA	5	5	3–2	43	89	48.3	528	5.9	64	3	4	59.6	19	78	4.1	15	0	10	80
1984	PIT	7	7	3–4	85	156	54.5	1,273	**8.2**	**80**	8	7	**79.9**	11	14	1.3	7	0	10	67
1985	PIT	9	6	4–2	94	183	51.4	1,357	7.4	69	6	14	54.8	17	71	4.2	13	2	13	84
Career		58	53	34–18–1	687	1,300	52.8	8,558	6.6	80	48	63	65.7	201	856	4.3	29	11	84	631

=== Playoffs ===
Year	Team	Games			Passing									Rushing					Sacks	
Year	Team	GP	GS	Record	Cmp	Att	Pct	Yds	Y/A	Lng	TD	Int	Rtg	Att	Yds	Avg	Lng	TD	Sck	Yds
1981	MIA	1	1	0–1	2	5	40.0	20	4.0	15	0	1	12.5	1	10	**10.0**	10	0	3	29
1982	MIA	**4**	**4**	**3–1**	**46**	**76**	**60.5**	**625**	**8.2**	**76**	**5**	**5**	**81.3**	**16**	**92**	5.8	**17**	**1**	**8**	**72**
1983	MIA	0	0	Did not play																
1984	PIT	0	0	Did not play																
Career		5	5	3–2	48	81	59.3	645	8.0	76	5	6	74.4	17	102	6.0	17	1	11	101

== Death ==
After football, Woodley returned to Shreveport and increasingly drank, causing several health problems. Married in 1981 to Suzanne Pugh, the couple later divorced. At age 33, he underwent a liver transplant at Willis-Knighton Medical Center in Shreveport in March 1992. Eleven years later, Woodley died from complications due to kidney and liver failure on May 4, 2003. Twenty years after Super Bowl XVII, he became the youngest Super Bowl starting quarterback to die. Since Woodley's death, only Super Bowl XXXIV starter Steve McNair, murdered in 2009 at age 36, died at a younger age. Woodley was buried at St. Joseph Cemetery in Shreveport, alongside his parents.
