= Dwayne Woodruff =

American football player and judge (born 1957)

Judge of the Court of Common Pleas in Allegheny County, Pennsylvania
- Incumbent
- Assumed office January 3, 2006

Personal details
- Born: February 18, 1957 (age 69) Bowling Green, Kentucky, U.S.
- Spouse: Joy Maxberry Woodruff
- Education: University of Louisville; Duquesne University School of Law
- Football career

No. 49
- Position: Cornerback

Personal information
- Listed height: 6 ft 0 in (1.83 m)
- Listed weight: 198 lb (90 kg)

Career information
- High school: New Richmond (New Richmond, Ohio)
- College: Louisville
- NFL draft: 1979: 6th round, 161st overall pick

Career history
- Pittsburgh Steelers (1979–1990)

Awards and highlights
- Super Bowl champion (XIV); Louisville Cardinals Ring of Honor; Inducted into KY Pro Football HOF (2005)

Career NFL statistics
- Interceptions: 37
- Interception yards: 689
- Total touchdowns: 5
- Games played: 157
- Fumble recoveries: 4
- Stats at Pro Football Reference

Dwayne D. Woodruff (born February 18, 1957) is an American judge and former professional football player who played twelve seasons as a cornerback for the Pittsburgh Steelers, where he accumulated 37 interceptions after being selected in the sixth round of the 1979 NFL draft. As a rookie, he won a Super Bowl ring with the Steelers in Super Bowl XIV. Outside of football, Woodruff has a J.D. degree and is a common pleas judge in Allegheny County (Pittsburgh), Pennsylvania.

== Football career ==
Woodruff was selected by the Pittsburgh Steelers in the sixth round of the 1979 NFL draft, after playing college football for the University of Louisville – Cardinals. He made his NFL debut with the Steelers in September 1979, playing in all 16 games and making 2 interceptions in the postseason which were instrumental in the team's ascension to Super Bowl XIV. In 1982, Woodruff led the team in interceptions with 5, ranking him as the AFC interception co-leader and resulting in his selection as the 1982 Steelers Most Valuable Player. One of the clutch interceptions occurred during overtime of the AFC rival Cincinnati Bengals game. Woodruff picked off quarterback Ken Anderson's pass and returned it 30 yards to the 2 yard line; on the next play, Terry Bradshaw threw a 2-yard, game-winning touchdown pass to John Stallworth. A standout defensive player, Woodruff led or co-led the Steelers in interceptions for 5 different seasons: 1982, 1985, 1987, 1988 & 1989 and is ranked 5th on the Steelers All-time list with 37 Interceptions. He is also ranked on the Steelers All-time list for Interceptions Returned for Touchdowns with 3; his longest touchdown return of 78 yards vs. the Miami Dolphins in December 1988, put the Steelers ahead 7–0 and ignited the Steelers to a 40–24 win. Additionally, Woodruff recovered 4 fumbles in his career, including a fumble returned 65 yards for a touchdown to put the Steelers ahead 7–0 vs. Atlanta Falcons in October 1984; the Steelers went on to win 34–14. In November 1989 vs. the Miami Dolphins, Woodruff returned a Carnell Lake fumble recovery which was lateraled to him for 21 yards and a touchdown tying the score 14–14; the Steelers went on to win 34–14.

== Career after football ==
During his NFL career, Woodruff obtained his Juris Doctor degree from Duquesne University School of Law in 1988, and became an associate attorney of the Meyer Darragh law firm, having the unprecedented distinction of practicing law and playing in the NFL simultaneously for 3 years. In 1997, he became a founding member of the law firm Woodruff & Flaherty, P.C. (now Flaherty Fardo, LLC) out of Shadyside in Pittsburgh. Woodruff was elected in 2005 to be a Judge in the Court of Common Pleas in Allegheny County, Pennsylvania and has presided primarily in the Family Court Division for the past ten years. Woodruff announced his candidacy for the Supreme Court of Pennsylvania in November 2014, but was unsuccessful in the May 2015 primary election. He was however elected to a second, ten-year term on the Court of Common Pleas in the general election in November 2015, leading the slate of all eight judges, who were up for retention, with the highest vote totals. Woodruff ran again for the state Supreme Court in the 2017 election, and earned the endorsement of the Pennsylvania Democratic Party. He did not prevail in the November general election.

Woodruff is a 1979 graduate of the University of Louisville in Kentucky, where his football jersey hangs in Papa John's Cardinal Stadium and where athletes study at the Woodruff Academic Center, named in Woodruff's honor in 2007 upon a significant monetary donation.

Woodruff is married to Joy Maxberry Woodruff. They are the parents of three children; Jillian an Ob/Gyn medical doctor in Anchorage, Alaska; Jenyce an attorney for TE Connectivity Corp in Philadelphia, PA, and John, also an attorney serving as a captain in the United States Marine Corps.

== Charitable work ==
Woodruff and his wife Joy are currently chairpersons of the "Do The Write Thing" in Pittsburgh. The program is an Initiative of the National Campaign to Stop Violence (NCSV). The Do the Write Thing Challenge gives middle school students an opportunity to examine the impact of violence on their lives through classroom discussions and in written form. By encouraging students to make personal commitments to do something about the problem, the program ultimately seeks to empower them to break the cycles of violence in their homes, schools and neighborhoods.

Woodruff is also chairman of the board for the Urban League of Greater Pittsburgh and the Vice President of the NFL Alumni Players Association. He serves on the board of the United Way of Allegheny County, is a member of the Sigma Pi Phi fraternity and a lifetime member of the NAACP. Judge Woodruff and his wife hosted an annual mentor recruitment breakfast for the Urban Pathways Charter School for 5 years to strengthen the resources of that school and Judge Woodruff presides over mock court trials annually for middle school, high school and law school students. He is also a much sought after graduation and event speaker; having spoken in the states of Pennsylvania, West Virginia, New York, Kentucky, Ohio, Florida and Alaska. Since 1982, the Dwayne Woodruff Scholarship ($2000 annually) has been awarded to a senior at New Richmond (Ohio) High School, his alma mater. Woodruff returned to New Richmond for Homecoming in October 2015 to present the "NFL Golden Football" to his high school football coach, Ron Bird. The special football is the NFL's way to commemorate the 50th anniversary of the Super Bowl by honoring the high schools of all Super Bowl players.

== Legacy ==
Dwayne Woodruff has been inducted into the University of Louisville Athletics Hall of Fame, the New Richmond High School Hall of Fame, The Kentucky Pro Football Hall of Fame, the Kentucky Athletic Hall of Fame (2013) In 2012, he received the Kentucky Governors Cup Award and in October 2015, the Pennsylvania Juvenile Court System awarded him with the Judicial Outstanding Leadership Award.
