= Tom Modrak =

American football executive

Tom Modrak was an American football executive who was the general manager for the Philadelphia Eagles from May 1998 until his dismissal in May 2001, and was most recently the Vice President of College Scouting for the Buffalo Bills from 2001 before being relieved of duties on May 4, 2011. Before Philadelphia, he was in charge of scouting for the Pittsburgh Steelers. He was elected to the Pittsburgh Pro Football Hall of Fame in 2014.

Modrak died on April 11, 2017, at the age of 74.
