= Mark Malone =

American football player (born 1958)

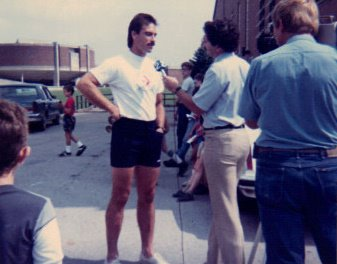
- Malone (left) in 1984

No. 16
- Position: Quarterback

Personal information
- Born: November 22, 1958 (age 67); El Cajon, California, U.S.
- Listed height: 6 ft 4 in (1.93 m)
- Listed weight: 223 lb (101 kg)

Career information
- High school: El Cajon Valley
- College: Arizona State
- NFL draft: 1980: 1st round, 28th overall pick

Career history
- Pittsburgh Steelers (1980–1987); San Diego Chargers (1988); New York Jets (1989)

Career NFL statistics
- Passing attempts: 1,648
- Passing completions: 839
- Completion percentage: 50.9%
- TD–INT: 60–81
- Passing yards: 10,175
- Passer rating: 61.9
- Stats at Pro Football Reference

Mark M. Malone (born November 22, 1958) is an American former professional football player who was a quarterback in the National Football League (NFL). He played college football for the Arizona State Sun Devils.

== Early life ==
Mark M. Malone was born on November 22, 1958, in El Cajon, California. He attended El Cajon Valley High School.

== College career ==
Malone was a star out of El Cajon Valley High School near San Diego, California, which ranged from baseball to basketball to track to football, which he had only started playing as a freshman. He also was recruited by the USOC as a possible decathlete for the 1980 Olympics.

He was a two-year starter at Arizona State University and was chosen by the Pittsburgh Steelers with the 28th pick in the 1980 NFL draft. Malone set an NCAA record with a 98-yard touchdown run against Utah State in 1979, the longest run ever by a college quarterback at that time, which wasn't surpassed until 2021.

== Professional career ==
Malone was selected 28th overall in the first round by the Pittsburgh Steelers in 1980, with head coach Chuck Noll stating that Malone's "great physical tools" was a key factor. Malone was on the bench for his rookie season, as Terry Bradshaw started all but one game while long-time backup Cliff Stoudt started one. The 1981 season saw him take a few reps on various sides, although a preseason injury led to a gradual deterioration in his right knee. As a rusher, he made sixteen carries for 68 yards for two touchdowns while also being lined up as a receiver in the November 8 game against the Seattle Seahawks due to injuries suffered to the starting receivers. He caught one pass for 90 yards from a pass by Bradshaw, which was his first as a player. It stood as a Steeler record for the longest receiving touchdown until Mike Wallace passed him in 2011 (which in turn was passed by JuJu Smith-Schuster in 2017). He took over in relief for the Week 14 game against the Oakland Raiders, going 17-for-27 for 244 yards with two touchdowns and two interceptions in the 30–27 loss. He was then tasked to start the ensuing two games to close out the season, which each resulted in losses. In total, he threw three touchdowns to five interceptions for 553 yards. He missed the entirety of the 1982 season due to lingering knee injuries, which required surgery.

After returning in 1983, he threw just twenty passes all year. The 1984 season saw him take the brunt of playing time as the Steelers attempted to deal with the changeover from Bradshaw (who had retired after 1983). David Woodley (traded to Pittsburgh after Miami drafted Dan Marino) started seven games before concussions and a fractured shin forced Malone in to start what would end up being nine of the last ten games of the season. Malone threw for 2,137 yards while going 6–3 with 16 touchdowns to 17 interceptions. He led the league in yards per pass completion with 14.5, which was likely helped by games such as against San Diego, where he went 18-for-22 attempts for 253 yards with 4 touchdowns and an interception. The Steelers went 9-7 (which included giving the San Francisco 49ers their only loss that year), which was good enough for a wild card spot and a matchup against the Denver Broncos that saw Malone tapped to start. He had two early fumbles that were recovered by Denver, but he went 17-of-28 for 224 yards and threw a touchdown pass that tied the game in the third quarter before Pittsburgh pulled away in the fourth to win 24–17. The Divisional Round win gave Pittsburgh a berth in the 1984 AFC Championship Game against the Miami Dolphins. Malone went 20-of-36 for 312 yards with three touchdowns and three interceptions as Miami pulled away by halftime in a 45–28 victory.

Malone ultimately never started a full season for the team due to injuries, which ranged from a dislocated big toe to a ripped elbow that needed staples. In 1985, he started eight games and threw for 1,428 yards with thirteen touchdowns to seven interceptions. He won AFC Offensive Player of the Week on opening day vs. the Indianapolis Colts by going 21-for-30 for 287 yards while tying Bradshaw's record for passing touchdowns with five (which also included a rushing touchdown). He threw a career high in yards with 374 against Cincinnati on September 30, but a toe injury hindered him. David Woodley started six games for the team while Scott Campbell had the other two. In 1986, a miserable start on opening day on the road in Seattle had fans in Pittsburgh ready to boo for the home opener by the first series. Malone stated later that he tried to not let the fans get to him as he had seen with Stoudt years earlier, but he instead got wound up too tight in trying to press early. He threw for one touchdown against eight interceptions in the opening three games (all resulting in losses). So negative was his reputation that WPXI-TV, the NBC affiliate that Malone did a weekly pregame show for, had a quarterback popularity poll done for the team that saw Malone finish third with 17% to Campbell and rookie draft pick Bubby Brister. A swollen thumb as a result of striking a helmet on an incomplete pass saw him miss the next two games for Brister. Malone went 6–8 as a starter while throwing for 2,444 yards with 15 touchdowns and 18 interceptions. Malone had a career high in rushing touchdowns with five, doing so on 31 carries for 107 yards. When asked about him, Bradshaw had stated that Malone had adequate skills, but that "he can't carry a football team. Let's just say that he's not my kind of quarterback. And the fans here don't like his style. I get letters." Malone responded that with a few more talented players, the team would be a title contender. In his final season with the Steelers in 1987, he started 12 games (going 6-6 while Steve Bono started the other three games) and threw for 1,896 yards while throwing for six touchdowns to 19 interceptions. He led the league in game-winning drives with three.

He was traded to the San Diego Chargers on April 12, 1988, as Pittsburgh favored Brister as a starter instead. He was tabbed to start eight of the last ten games of the season. He lost the first six before winning the last two, one of which came against Pittsburgh. In his final start as a player, he went 6-of-10 for 91 yards while running for a touchdown in a 24–13 win over Kansas City. Going 2–6, he threw for 1,580 yards and threw for six touchdowns to 13 interceptions. He then moved to the New York Jets for 1989, throwing two passes before retirement. He was the fourth-ranked quarterback in franchise history at the time with 8,582 yards. For his career Malone passed for 10,175 yards and 60 touchdowns, and he rushed 159 times for 628 yards and 18 touchdowns.

== Career statistics ==
=== NFL ===
Legend
**Bold**	Career high

==== Regular season ====
Year	Team	Games			Passing									Rushing					Sacks	
Year	Team	GP	GS	Record	Cmp	Att	Pct	Yds	Y/A	Lng	TD	Int	Rtg	Att	Yds	Avg	Lng	TD	Sck	Yds
1980	PIT	1	0	0-0	0	0	0.0	0	0.0	0	0	0	0.0	0	0	0.0	0	0	0	0
1981	PIT	8	3	0-2	45	88	51.1	553	6.3	30	3	5	58.6	16	68	4.3	19	2	10	76
1983	PIT	2	0	0-0	9	20	45.0	124	6.2	38	1	2	42.5	0	0	0.0	0	0	1	11
1984	PIT	13	9	**6-3**	147	272	54.0	2,137	**7.9**	61	**16**	17	73.4	25	42	1.7	13	3	**25**	**211**
1985	PIT	10	8	3-5	117	233	50.2	1,428	6.1	45	13	7	75.5	15	80	**5.3**	25	1	10	80
1986	PIT	**14**	**14**	**6-8**	**216**	**425**	50.8	**2,444**	5.8	48	15	18	62.5	31	107	3.5	**45**	**5**	13	97
1987	PIT	12	12	**6-6**	156	336	46.4	1,896	5.6	**63**	6	**19**	46.7	34	162	4.8	42	3	18	151
1988	SDG	12	8	2-6	147	272	54.0	1,580	5.8	59	6	13	58.8	**37**	**169**	4.6	36	4	9	45
1989	NYJ	1	0	0-0	2	2	**100.0**	13	6.5	11	0	0	**93.7**	1	0	0.0	0	0	0	0
Career		73	54	23-30	839	1,648	50.9	10,175	6.2	63	60	81	61.9	159	628	3.9	45	18	86	671

==== Playoffs ====
Year	Team	Games			Passing									Rushing					Sacks	
Year	Team	GP	GS	Record	Cmp	Att	Pct	Yds	Y/A	Lng	TD	Int	Rtg	Att	Yds	Avg	Lng	TD	Sck	Yds
1983	PIT	1	0	0-0	3	7	42.9	22	3.1	10	0	0	50.9	0	0	0.0	0	0	0	0
1984	PIT	**2**	**2**	**1-1**	**37**	**64**	**57.8**	**536**	**8.4**	**65**	**4**	**3**	**86.5**	**5**	-6	-1.2	0	0	**2**	**12**
Career		3	2	1-1	40	71	56.3	558	7.9	65	4	3	83.0	5	-6	-1.2	0	0	2	12

=== College ===
Season	Team	GP	Passing							Rushing			
Season	Team	GP	Cmp	Att	Pct	Yds	TD	Int	Rtg	Att	Yds	Avg	TD
1977	Arizona State	11	14	26	53.8	197	2	1	135.2	27	168	6.2	0
1978	Arizona State	11	93	205	45.4	1,305	11	15	101.9	143	705	4.9	9
1979	Arizona State	11	148	289	51.2	1,886	10	12	109.1	132	471	3.6	12
College career		33	255	520	49.0	3,388	23	28	133.9	302	1,344	4.5	21

== Station wagon incident ==
On December 3, 1987, Tony Morelli, a Steelers fan who was frustrated with Malone's performance, plowed through the front gates of Three Rivers Stadium with his station wagon, narrowly missing stadium workers. Once inside, he ran over eight 10-gallon vats of nacho cheese sauce, then raced around the stadium's walkways and ramps at speeds of up to 50 mph. Stadium officials later found him on the field kicking field goals without a football. Morelli underwent a psychiatric examination before being released to police, who charged him with reckless endangerment, criminal mischief, and criminal trespass. The charges were dropped when he paid $1,345 in restitution, of which $685 went towards the cost of the nacho cheese.

== Sportscasting career ==
After his playing career ended, he had thoughts about opening a construction company. He was surprised to have an offer for broadcasting and decided to give it a shot. Malone worked a variety of places, such as WPXI in Pittsburgh and ESPN, where he was a host and analyst on the programs NFL Matchup and NFL 2night. He later became sports director and lead sports anchor at WBBM-TV in Chicago, which resulted in four Chicago / Midwest Emmy Awards. The station did not renew his contract in 2008. He also served a stint as a booth analyst and sideline reporter for Dial Global. Malone then moved to Westwood One as a color commentator for its NFL coverage. He was paired for a radio talk show broadcast by NBC Sports Radio with Donovan McNabb in 2013. He also had his own show with Under Center with Mark Malone, broadcast on Westwood One. In 2019, Malone covered the Alliance of American Football for Bleacher Report Live as a play-by-play announcer. Malone lives in Scottsdale, Arizona.
