= 1987 Pittsburgh Steelers season =

NFL team season

- Owner: Art Rooney
- General manager: Dick Haley
- Head coach: Chuck Noll
- Offensive coordinator: Tom Moore
- Defensive coordinator: Tony Dungy
- Home stadium: Three Rivers Stadium

Results
- Record: 8–7
- Division place: 3rd AFC Central
- Playoffs: Did not qualify
- All-Pros: None
- Pro Bowlers: C Mike Webster
- Team MVP: Mike Merriweather
- Team ROY: Delton Hall

The 1987 Pittsburgh Steelers season was the franchise's 55th season as a professional sports franchise and as a member of the National Football League. The team improved from a 6–10 record from 1986 and finishing 8–7 record and fail to reach the playoffs for a third straight season. Noll was renowned as a stoic character, but in complete contrast was his reaction to Jerry Glanville, the head coach of the Oilers. After the Steelers second meeting, Noll in the postgame handshake grabbed Glanville and told him he'd better watch out or he'd get jumped on. This was in reaction to Glanville's earlier comments on how the Oilers field was the 'house of pain' and his prediction that his players would intentionally hurt the Steelers.

1987 would also mark a "bridging the eras" moment in Steelers history, as 1987 would mark the final seasons of Hall of Famers John Stallworth and Donnie Shell while also being the rookie season of another future Hall of Famer, Rod Woodson. Alongside fellow Hall of Famer Mike Webster (who would return for 1988), Stallworth and Shell were two of the final three players on the roster that had been part of all four Super Bowl-winning teams of the 1970s, while Woodson alongside fellow rookie Greg Lloyd (who would miss the 1987 season due to injuries) would be key members of the Steelers return to prominence in the 1990s.

== Offseason ==
=== NFL draft ===
The Steelers 1987 draft class consisted of six offensive and seven defensive players with Cornerback Rod Woodson being taken first with the team's 10th overall pick. Woodson would go on to be inducted into the Pro Football Hall of Fame in the class of 2009

Although the Steelers wanted to draft Rod Woodson to help rebuild their secondary, the team expected Woodson to be drafted before their turn at tenth overall. Head coach Chuck Noll instructed defensive coordinator Tony Dungy not to bother with a scouting report on Woodson due to his expected unavailability. However, the Pittsburgh Steelers were able to draft Woodson after the Cleveland Browns traded for the San Diego Chargers' fifth overall pick and subsequently used selection to draft linebacker Mike Junkin, who was eventually a bust. The St. Louis Cardinals drafted Kelly Stouffer (sixth overall) who ultimately never played for the Cardinals due to a contract dispute. The Buffalo Bills were the last likely team to draft Woodson, but instead used the eighth overall pick to draft linebacker Shane Conlan.

After the team drafted Woodson in the first round, the team would go on to draft cornerback Delton Hall in the second round with their 38th overall pick. Hall would eventually get more playing time than Woodson in the 1987 season, starting in all twelve games. Woodson held out for a bigger contract into the season and would see appearances in eight games, starting in none of them. In addition to Woodson and Lloyd, the team also drafted future Pro Bowlers Thomas Everett and Hardy Nickerson, as well as fullback Merril Hoge, who would be a starter for several seasons and later be an analyst for ESPN. After the draft ended, the team would sign Dwight Stone as an undrafted free agent, who would go on to play 14 years in the NFL including eight in Pittsburgh.

1987 Pittsburgh Steelers draft
Round	Pick	Player	Position	College	Notes
1	10	Rod Woodson * ^{†}	Cornerback	Purdue	
2	38	Delton Hall	Cornerback	Clemson	
3	66	Charles Lockett	Wide receiver	Long Beach State	
4	94	Thomas Everett *	Safety	Baylor	
5	122	Hardy Nickerson *	Linebacker	California	
6	141	Tim Johnson	Defensive tackle	Penn State	
6	150	Greg Lloyd *	Linebacker	Fort Valley State	
7	178	Chris Kelley	Tight end	Akron	
8	205	Charles Buchanan	Defensive end	Tennessee State	
9	233	Joey Clinkscales	Wide receiver	Tennessee	
10	261	Merril Hoge	Running back	Idaho State	
11	289	Paul Oswald	Center	Kansas	
12	317	Theo Young	Tight end	Arkansas	
Made roster † Pro Football Hall of Fame * Made at least one Pro Bowl during career

=== Undrafted free agents ===
1987 undrafted free agents of note
Player	Position	College
Lyneal Alston	Wide receiver	Southern Miss
Eric Anderson	Wide receiver	UTEP
Steve Apke	Linebacker	Pittsburgh
Warren Bone	Defensive end	Texas Southern
Dennis Borcky	Nose tackle	Memphis State
Richard Bosselmann	Linebacker	Cal Poly
Ralph Britt	Tight end	NC State
George Cimadevilla	Punter	East Tennessee State
Spark Clark	Running Back	Akron
Mike Crow	Punter	Northwestern State
Moses Ford	Wide receiver	Fayetteville State
Corey Gilmore	Running back	San Diego State
James Hansen	Offensive tackle	Utah
Joe Pizzo	Quarterback	Mars Hill
Mike Russo	Nose tackle	Penn State
Vernon Stewart	Wide receiver	Akron
Albert Williams	Linebacker	UTEP

== Personnel ==
=== Staff ===
1987 Pittsburgh Steelers staff
Front office: Chairman of the board – Arthur J. Rooney; President – Daniel M. Rooney; Vice president – John R. McGinley; Vice president – Arthur J. Rooney, Jr.; Treasurer – Dennis P. Thimons; Business manager – Joe Gordon; Chief negotiator – James A. Boston; Office manager - stadium – Dan Ferens; Publicity director – Dan Edwards; Assistant publicity director – Pat Hanlon; Director of ticket sales – Geraldine Glenn; Computer director - accounting – Jim Ellenberger; Director of player personnel – Dick Haley; Director of pro scouting – Tom Modrak; Talent scout – East – Tom Donahoe; Talent scout – Midwest – Jesse Kaye; Talent scout – West Coast – Bob Schmitz; Head coaches: Head coach – Chuck Noll; Offensive coaches: Offensive coordinator – Tom Moore; Offensive Line: Tackles/Tight Ends – Ron Blackledge; Offensive backfield – Dick Hoak; Offensive Line: Centers/Guards – Hal Hunter; Computer & special teams – Jon Kolb	Defensive coaches: Defensive coordinator – Tony Dungy; Computer & special teams – Dennis Fitzgerald; Defensive line – Joe Greene; Linebackers – Jed Hughes; Strength and conditioning: Conditioning & training coach – Walt Evans; Dentist – Dr. George P. Boucek; Ophthalmologist – Dr. Phillip Buzzelli; Physician, orthopedic – Dr. Thomas W. Cowan; Physician, M.D. – Dr. David S. Huber; Neurological surgery consultant – Dr. Joseph C. Maroon; Physician, M.D. – Dr. Richard Rydze; Physician, consultant – Dr. Abraham J.Twerski; Physician, M.D. – Dr. Anthony P. Yates; Trainer – Ralph Berlin; Trainer – Fran Feld; Equipment manager – Anthony Parisi; Field manager – Rodgers Freyvogel; Video & film director – Bob McCartney; Photographers – Mike Fabus, Bill Amatucci

=== NFL replacement players ===
After the league decided to use replacement players during the NFLPA strike, the following team was assembled:

1987 Pittsburgh Steelers replacement roster
Quarterbacks: 15 Steve Bono; —- Kevin Brown; 7 Reggie Collier; Running backs: 44 Rodney Carter; 23 Spark Clark; 40 Dan Reeder; -- Eric Sams; 45 Chuck Sanders; Wide receivers: 81 Lyneal Alston; 83 Mel Anderson; —- Darryl Crane; 88 Joey Clinkscales; 87 Moses Ford; 85 Russell Hairston; Tight ends: 86 Ralph Britt; 84 Danzell Lee	Offensive linemen: 70 Clancy Barone C; 60 Brian Blankenship G; 65 Jim Boyle T; 61 Charlie Dickey G; 66 Ben Lawrence G; 51 John Lott C/G; 68 Jeff Lucas T; 76 Jerry Quick T; 63 Robert Washington T; Defensive linemen: 96 Jackie Cline; 91 Tommy Dawkins DE; 64 Alan Huff NT; 92 Michael Minter NT; 69 Dave Opfar NT; 95 Bret Shugarts DE; 98 Xavier Warren DE	Linebackers: 90 Steve Apke; 54 Craig Bingham; 50 Daryl Knox ILB; 99 Avon Riley LB; 94 Bert Williams LB; 97 Joe Williams LB; Defensive backs: 42 Dave Edwards DB; 29 Cornell Gowdy; 47 Bruce Jones; 37 Kelvin Middleton; 47 Cameron Riley SS; 38 Rock Richmond; 25 Anthony Tuggle DB; 21 Ray Williams DB; Special teams: 10 John Bruno; 5 David Trout K

=== Roster ===
1987 Pittsburgh Steelers roster
Quarterbacks (QB): 15 Steve Bono; 6 Bubby Brister; 16 Mark Malone; Running backs (RB): 34 Walter Abercrombie; 44 Rodney Carter; 33 Merril Hoge; 43 Earnest Jackson; 30 Frank Pollard; 20 Dwight Stone; Wide receivers (WR): 88 Joey Clinkscales; 83 Louis Lipps; 89 Charles Lockett; 82 John Stallworth; 87 Weegie Thompson; Tight ends (TE): 84 Danzell Lee; 80 Theo Young	Offensive linemen (OL): 72 Buddy Aydelette T; 60 Brian Blankenship G; 62 Tunch Ilkin T; 74 Terry Long G; 65 Ray Pinney T; 76 Jerry Quick T; 79 John Rienstra G; 52 Mike Webster C; 73 Craig Wolfley G; Defensive linemen (DL): 67 Gary Dunn NT; 68 Lorenzo Freeman NT; 92 Keith Gary DE; 78 Tim Johnson DE; 64 Edmund Nelson DE; 98 Gerald Williams NT; 93 Keith Willis DE	Linebackers (LB): 91 Gregg Carr ILB; 56 Robin Cole ILB; 53 Bryan Hinkle OLB; 50 David Little ILB; 57 Mike Merriweather OLB; 54 Hardy Nickerson ILB; 56 Tyronne Stowe ILB; 55 Ken Woodard OLB; Defensive backs (DB): 27 Thomas Everett FS; 29 Cornell Gowdy SS; 33 Larry Griffin CB; 35 Delton Hall CB; 28 Lupe Sanchez FS; 31 Donnie Shell SS; 49 Dwayne Woodruff CB; 26 Rod Woodson CB; Special teams (ST): 1 Gary Anderson K; 18 Harry Newsome P	Practice squad Reserve: 66 Mark Behning T (IR); 24 Rich Erenberg RB (IR); 86 Preston Gothard TE (IR); 96 Anthony Henton LB (PUP); 95 Greg Lloyd LB (IR); 85 Calvin Sweeney WR (IR); Rookies in italics

== Preseason ==
=== Schedule ===
Week	Date	Opponent	Game Site	Kickoff (ET)	TV	Result	Record
1	Fri. Aug. 14	at Washington Redskins	RFK Stadium	8:00 p.m.	WTAE	L 23–17	0–1
2	Sat. Aug. 22	at Chicago Bears	Soldier Field	7:00 p.m.	WTAE	L 50–14	0–2
3	Sat. Aug. 29	at New Orleans Saints	Louisiana Superdome	8:00 p.m.	WTAE	L 31–28	0–3
4	Sat. Sep. 5	New York Giants	Three Rivers Stadium	9:00 p.m.	CBS	L 26–20	0–4

== Regular season ==
=== Schedule ===
Week	Date	Opponent	Game Site	Kickoff (ET)	TV	Result	Record
1	Sun. Sep. 13	San Francisco 49ers	Three Rivers Stadium	1:00 p.m.	CBS	W 30–17	1–0
2	Sun. Sep. 20	at Cleveland Browns	Cleveland Municipal Stadium	1:00 p.m.	NBC	L 34–10	1–1
3	Sun. Sep. 27	New York Jets	Three Rivers Stadium	4:00 p.m.	NBC	Cancelled	1–1
4	Sun. Oct. 4	at Atlanta Falcons	Atlanta–Fulton County Stadium	1:00 p.m.	NBC	W 28–12	2–1
5	Sun. Oct. 11	at Los Angeles Rams	Anaheim Stadium	4:00 p.m.	NBC	L 31–21	2–2
6	Sun. Oct. 18	Indianapolis Colts	Three Rivers Stadium	1:00 p.m.	NBC	W 21–7	3–2
7	Sun. Oct. 25	Cincinnati Bengals	Three Rivers Stadium	1:00 p.m.	NBC	W 23–20	4–2
8	Sun. Nov. 1	at Miami Dolphins	Joe Robbie Stadium	1:00 p.m.	NBC	L 35–24	4–3
9	Sun. Nov. 8	at Kansas City Chiefs	Arrowhead Stadium	1:00 p.m.	NBC	W 17–16	5–3
10	Sun. Nov. 15	Houston Oilers	Three Rivers Stadium	1:00 p.m.	NBC	L 23–3	5–4
11	Sun. Nov. 22	at Cincinnati Bengals	Riverfront Stadium	1:00 p.m.	NBC	W 30–16	6–4
12	Sun. Nov. 29	New Orleans Saints	Three Rivers Stadium	1:00 p.m.	CBS	L 20–16	6–5
13	Sun. Dec. 6	Seattle Seahawks	Three Rivers Stadium	1:00 p.m.	NBC	W 13–9	7–5
14	Sun. Dec. 13	at San Diego Chargers	Jack Murphy Stadium	4:00 p.m.	NBC	W 20–16	8–5
15	Sun. Dec. 20	at Houston Oilers	Astrodome	1:00 p.m.	NBC	L 24–16	8–6
16	Sat. Dec. 26	Cleveland Browns	Three Rivers Stadium	12:30 p.m.	NBC	L 19–13	8–7

=== Game summaries ===
==== Week 1 (Sunday September 13, 1987): vs. San Francisco 49ers ====
	1	2	3	4	Total
49ers	0	3	7	7	17
Steelers	7	10	3	10	30

at Three Rivers Stadium, Pittsburgh, Pennsylvania

- Game time: 1:00 PM EDT
- Game weather: 76 °F (24 °C) (Drizzle)
- Game attendance: 55,735
- Referee: Gordon McCarter
- TV announcers: (CBS) Jim Lampley (play by play), Ken Stabler (color commentator)
- Pittsburgh – Hall 50 fumble return (Anderson kick)
- San Francisco – FG Wersching 43
- Pittsburgh – Gothard 2 pass from Malone (Anderson kick)
- Pittsburgh – FG Anderson 50
- Pittsburgh – FG Anderson 41
- San Francisco – Frank 1 pass from Montana (Wersching kick)
- Pittsburgh – FG Anderson 44
- Pittsburgh – Abercrombie 28 run (Anderson kick)
- San Francisco – Rice 3 pass from Montana (Wersching kick)

==== Week 2 (Sunday September 20, 1987): at Cleveland Browns ====
	1	2	3	4	Total
Steelers	0	3	7	0	10
Browns	0	10	7	17	34

at Cleveland Municipal Stadium, Cleveland, Ohio

- Game time: 1:00 PM EDT
- Game weather:
- Game attendance: 79,543
- Referee: Gene Barth
- TV announcers: (NBC) Marv Albert (play by play), Joe Namath (color commentator)
- Cleveland – FG Jaeger 29
- Cleveland – Mack 1 run (Jaeger kick)
- Pittsburgh – FG Anderson 27
- PIttsburgh – Shell 19 fumble return (Anderson kick)
- Cleveland – McNeil 11 pass from Kosar (Jaeger kick)
- Cleveland – FG Jaeger 23
- Cleveland – Matthews 26 interception return (Jaeger kick)
- Cleveland – Weathers 37 pass from Kosar (Jaeger kick)

==== Week 3 (Sunday September 27, 1987): vs. New York Jets ====
Cancelled due to player's strike.

==== Week 4 (Sunday October 4, 1987): at Atlanta Falcons ====
	1	2	3	4	Total
Steelers	0	14	0	14	28
Falcons	3	0	2	7	12

at Atlanta–Fulton County Stadium, Atlanta, Georgia

- Game time: 1:00 PM EDT
- Game weather:
- Game attendance: 16,667
- Referee: Red Cashion
- TV announcers: (NBC) Mel Proctor (play by play), Reggie Rucker (color commentator)

This game was played with replacement players.

- Atlanta – FG Davis 27
- Pittsburgh – Jackson 1 run (Trout kick)
- Pittsburgh – Hairston 5 pass from Bono (Trout kick)
- Atlanta – Safety, Bono penalized for intentional grounding in end zone
- Pittsburgh – Bono 1 run (Trout kick)
- Pittsburgh – Clinkscales 11 pass from Collier (Trout kick)
- Atlanta – Barney 19 pass from Van Raaphorst (Davis kick)

==== Week 5 (Sunday October 11, 1987): at Los Angeles Rams ====
	1	2	3	4	Total
Steelers	7	7	0	7	21
Rams	7	14	7	3	31

at Anaheim Stadium, Anaheim, California

- Game time: 4:00 PM EDT
- Game weather:
- Game attendance: 20,219
- Referee: Bob Frederic
- TV announcers: (NBC) Fred Roggin (play by play), Dave Lapham (color commentator)

This game was played with replacement players.

- Los Angeles Rams – Jackson recovered blocked punt in end zone (Lansford kick)
- Pittsburgh – Alston 22 pass from Bono (Trout kick)
- Pittsburgh – Carter 10 pass from Bono (Trout kick)
- Los Angeles Rams – White 2 run (Lansford kick)
- Los Angeles Rams – McDonald 1 pass from Dils (Lansford kick)
- Los Angeles Rams – Moore 11 pass from Dils (Lansford kick)
- Los Angeles Rams – FG Lansford 29
- Pittsburgh – Alston 42 pass from Collier (Trout kick)

==== Week 6 (Sunday October 18, 1987): vs. Indianapolis Colts ====
Week Six: Indianapolis Colts (2–2) at Pittsburgh Steelers (2–2)

Quarter	1	2	3	4	Total
Colts	0	7	0	0	7
Steelers	7	0	0	14	21

at Three Rivers Stadium, Pittsburgh, Pennsylvania

- Date: October 18
- Game time: 1:00 p.m. EDT
- Game weather: Scattered clouds, 53 °F (12 °C)
- Game attendance: 34,627
- Referee: Tom Dooley
- TV announcers (NBC): Tom Hammond and Sam Rutigliano
- Box Score, Box Score

This game was played with replacement players.

Team	Category	Player	Statistics
Colts	Passing	Blair Kiel	17/30, 195 Yds, TD, 3 INT
Colts	Rushing	Gordon Brown	9 Rush, 32 Yds
Colts	Receiving	Mark Bellini	5 Rec, 69 Yds
Steelers	Passing	Steve Bono	11/23, 138 Yds, 2 TD, INT
Steelers	Rushing	Earnest Jackson	24 Rush, 134 Yds
Steelers	Receiving	John Stallworth	5 Rec, 54 Yds, TD

Scoring summary

Quarter	Time	Drive			Team	Scoring information	Score	
Quarter	Time	Plays	Yards	TOP	Team	Scoring information	IND	PIT
1	7:06				Steelers	John Stallworth 3-yard touchdown reception from Steve Bono, David Trout kick good	0	7
2	1:54				Colts	Walter Murray 20-yard touchdown reception from Blair Kiel, Steve Jordan kick good	7	7
4	10:01				Steelers	Merril Hoge 20-yard touchdown reception from Steve Bono, David Trout kick good	7	14
4	3:00				Steelers	Chuck Sanders 10-yard touchdown run, David Trout kick good	7	21
"TOP" = time of possession. For other American football terms, see Glossary of American football.							7	21

==== Week 7 (Sunday October 25, 1987): vs. Cincinnati Bengals ====
	1	2	3	4	Total
Bengals	7	7	6	0	20
Steelers	3	0	7	13	23

at Three Rivers Stadium, Pittsburgh, Pennsylvania

- Game time: 1:00 PM EST
- Game weather: 49 °F (9 °C) (Mostly Cloudy)
- Game attendance: 53,692
- Referee: Fred Wyant
- TV announcers: (NBC) Don Criqui (play by play), Bob Trumpy (color commentator)
- Cincinnati – Kinnebrew 2 run (Breech kick)
- Pittsburgh – FG Anderson 45
- Cincinnati – Martin 41 pass from Esiason (Breech kick)
- Pittsburgh – Hall 25 run with lateral after Hinkle interception (Anderson kick)
- Cincinnati – Jennings 9 pass from Esiason (kick failed)
- Pittsburgh – FG Anderson 21
- Pittsburgh – Stallworth 12 pass from Malone (Anderson kick)
- Pittsburgh – FG Anderson 20

==== Week 8 (Sunday November 1, 1987): at Miami Dolphins ====
	1	2	3	4	Total
Steelers	14	7	3	0	24
Dolphins	0	7	14	14	35

at Joe Robbie Stadium, Miami, Florida

- Game time: 1:00 PM EST
- Game weather:
- Game attendance: 52,578
- Referee: Bob McElwee
- TV announcers: (NBC) Sam Nover (play by play), Michael Jackson (color commentator)
- Pittsburgh – Lockett 10 pass from Malone (Anderson kick)
- Pittsburgh – Shell 50 interception return (Anderson kick)
- Miami – Hardy 2 pass from Marino (Reveiz kick)
- Pittsburgh – Pollard 1 run (Anderson kick)
- Miami – Clayton 41 pass from Marino (Reveiz kick)
- Pittsburgh – FG Anderson 43
- Miami – Duper 50 pass from Marino (Reveiz kick)
- Miami – Clayton 33 pass from Marino (Reveiz kick)
- Miami – Stradford 5 run (Reveiz kick)

==== Week 9 (Sunday November 8, 1987): at Kansas City Chiefs ====
	1	2	3	4	Total
Steelers	0	7	7	3	17
Chiefs	7	3	0	6	16

at Arrowhead Stadium, Kansas City, Missouri

- Game time: 1:00 PM EST
- Game weather:
- Game attendance: 45,249
- Referee: Jim Tunney
- TV announcers: (NBC) Tom Hammond (play by play), Michael Jackson (color commentator)
- Kansas City – Maas 6 fumble return (Lowery kick)
- Pittsburgh – Carter 4 pass from Malone (Anderson kick)
- Kansas City – FG Lowery 41
- Pittsburgh – Carter 26 pass from Malone (Anderson kick)
- Kansas City – FG Lowery 27
- Kansas City – FG Lowery 38
- Pittsburgh – FG Anderson 44

==== Week 10 (Sunday November 15, 1987): vs. Houston Oilers ====
	1	2	3	4	Total
Oilers	0	3	14	6	23
Steelers	3	0	0	0	3

at Three Rivers Stadium, Pittsburgh, Pennsylvania

- Game time: 1:00 PM EST
- Game weather: 63 °F (17 °C) (Partly Cloudy)
- Game attendance: 56,177
- Referee: Jerry Seeman
- TV announcers: (NBC) Marv Albert (play by play), Joe Namath (color commentator)
- Pittsburgh – FG Anderson 22
- Houston – FG Zendejas 34
- Houston – Duncan 14 pass from Moon (Zendejas kick)
- Houston – D. Hill 42 pass from Moon (Zendejas kick)
- Houston – FG Zendejas 20
- Houston – FG Zendejas 40

==== Week 11 (Sunday November 22, 1987): at Cincinnati Bengals ====
	1	2	3	4	Total
Steelers	3	10	7	10	30
Bengals	3	3	3	7	16

at Riverfront Stadium, Cincinnati, Ohio

- Game time: 1:00 PM EST
- Game weather:
- Game attendance: 59,910
- Referee: Fred Silva
- TV announcers: (NBC) Mel Proctor (play by play), Sam Rutigliano (color commentator)
- Pittsburgh – FG Anderson 43
- Cincinnati – FG Breech 35
- Pittsburgh – FG Anderson 52
- Pittsburgh – Woodson 45 interception return (Anderson kick)
- Cincinnati – FG Breech 38
- Cincinnati – FG Breech 41
- Pittsburgh – Thompson 14 pass from Malone (Anderson kick)
- Pittsburgh – FG Anderson 46
- CIncinnati – Kinnebrew 2 run (Breech kick)
- Pittsburgh – Malone 42 run (Anderson kick)

==== Week 12 (Sunday November 29, 1987): vs. New Orleans Saints ====
	1	2	3	4	Total
Saints	3	0	7	10	20
Steelers	0	14	0	2	16

at Three Rivers Stadium, Pittsburgh, Pennsylvania

- Game time: 1:00 PM EST
- Game weather: 48 °F (9 °C) (Overcast)
- Game attendance: 47,896
- Referee: Fred Wyant
- TV announcers: (CBS) Tim Brant (play by play), Hank Stram (color commentator)
- New Orleans – FG Andersen 25
- Pittsburgh – Woodruff 33 interception return (Anderson kick)
- Pittsburgh – Abercrombie 5 run (Anderson kick)
- New Orleans – Mayes 5 run (Andersen kick)
- New Orleans – Martin 19 pass from Hebert (Andersen kick)
- New Orleans – FG Andersen 32
- Pittsburgh – Safety, Hansen ran out of end zone

==== Week 13 (Sunday December 6, 1987): vs. Seattle Seahawks ====
	1	2	3	4	Total
Seahawks	3	6	0	0	9
Steelers	3	3	0	7	13

at Three Rivers Stadium, Pittsburgh, Pennsylvania

- Game time: 1:00 PM EST
- Game weather: 32 °F (0 °C) (Overcast)
- Game attendance: 48,881
- Referee: Gordon McCarter
- TV announcers: (NBC) Tom Hammond (play by play), Michael Jackson (color commentator)
- Pittsburgh – FG Anderson 37
- Seattle – FG Johnson 33
- Seattle – Largent 12 pass from Krieg (pass failed)
- Pittsburgh – FG Anderson 24
- Pittsburgh – Pollard 11 run (Anderson kick)

==== Week 14 (Sunday December 13, 1987): at San Diego Chargers ====
	1	2	3	4	Total
Steelers	0	7	10	3	20
Chargers	9	0	7	0	16

at Jack Murphy Stadium, San Diego, California

- Game time: 4:00 PM EST
- Game weather:
- Game attendance: 51,605
- Referee: Jim Tunney
- TV announcers: (NBC) Don Criqui (play by play), Bob Trumpy (color commentator)
- San Diego – Brandon recovered blocked punt in end zone (Abbott kick)
- San Diego – Safety, Ehin tackled Malone in end zone
- Pittsburgh – Pollard 8 run (Anderson kick)
- Pittsburgh – Malone 7 run (Anderson kick)
- Pittsburgh – FG Anderson 43
- Pittsburgh – FG Anderson 33
- San Diego – James 15 pass from Fouts (Abbott kick)

==== Week 15 (Sunday December 20, 1987): at Houston Oilers ====
	1	2	3	4	Total
Steelers	3	3	7	3	16
Oilers	0	10	7	7	24

at Astrodome, Houston, Texas

- Game time: 1:00 PM EST
- Game weather: Dome
- Game attendance: 36,683
- Referee: Tom Dooley
- TV announcers: (NBC) Tom Hammond (play by play), Sam Rutigliano (color commentator)
- Pittsburgh – FG Anderson 25
- Pittsburgh – FG Anderson 35
- Houston – Hill 52 pass from Moon (Zendejas kick)
- Houston – FG Zendejas 34
- Pittsburgh – Malone 1 run (Anderson kick)
- Houston – Pinkett 5 run (Zendejas kick)
- Pittsburgh – FG Anderson 20
- Houston – Hill 30 pass from Moon (Zendejas kick)

==== Week 16 (Saturday December 26, 1987): vs. Cleveland Browns ====
	1	2	3	4	Total
Browns	3	6	3	7	19
Steelers	0	3	0	10	13

at Three Rivers Stadium, Pittsburgh, Pennsylvania

- Game time: 12:30 PM EST
- Game weather: 35 °F (2 °C) (Overcast)
- Game attendance: 56,394
- Referee: Dick Hantak
- TV announcers: (NBC) Don Criqui (play by play), Bob Trumpy (color commentator)
- Cleveland – FG Bahr 31
- Cleveland – Tennell 2 pass from Kosar (kick failed)
- Pittsburgh – FG Anderson 39
- Cleveland – FG Bahr 30
- Pittsburgh – FG Anderson 27
- Cleveland – Byner 2 run (Bahr kick)
- Pittsburgh – Gowdy 45 interception return (Anderson kick)

=== Standings ===
AFC Central
	W	L	T	PCT	DIV	CONF	PF	PA	STK
Cleveland Browns^{(2)}	10	5	0	.667	5–1	8–3	390	239	W3
Houston Oilers^{(4)}	9	6	0	.600	5–1	7–4	345	349	W2
Pittsburgh Steelers	8	7	0	.533	2–4	6–5	285	299	L2
Cincinnati Bengals	4	11	0	.267	0–6	3–9	285	370	L3
