= Pittsburgh Steelers all-time roster (A–K) =

1,653 players have appeared in at least one regular season or postseason game in the National Football League (NFL) for the Pittsburgh Steelers franchise since 1933. This list includes those whose last names fall between "A" and "K". For the rest of the players, see Pittsburgh Steelers all-time roster (L–Z). This list is accurate through the end of the 2025 NFL season.

== A ==
- Walter Abercrombie
- Ed Adamchik
- Bob Adams
- Flozell Adams
- Mike Adams (born 1990)
- Mike Adams (born 1974)
- Montravius Adams
- Ola Adeniyi
- Ben Agajanian
- Dick Alban
- Tom Alberghini
- Art Albrecht
- John Alderton
- Brent Alexander
- Kwon Alexander
- Brian Allen
- Chuck Allen
- Cortez Allen
- Duane Allen
- Jimmy Allen
- Kyle Allen
- Lou Allen
- Marcus Allen
- Will Allen
- Don Alley
- John Allred
- Lyneal Alston
- Tyson Alualu
- Rudy Andabaker
- Anthony Anderson
- Art Anderson
- Calvin Anderson
- Chet Anderson
- Fred Anderson
- Gary Anderson
- Jesse Anderson
- Larry Anderson
- Mel Anderson
- Ralph Anderson
- Ryan Anderson
- Spencer Anderson
- Steve Apke
- Dri Archer
- Daniel Archibong
- Al Arndt
- Dick Arndt
- Brian Arnfelt
- David Arnold
- Jahine Arnold
- Jay Arnold
- Corrie Artman
- Willie Asbury
- Bert Askson
- Frank Atkinson
- Steve August
- Gene Augusterfer
- Calvin Austin
- Ocie Austin
- Steve Avery
- Buddy Aydelette
- Demarcus Ayers

== B ==
- Rich Badar
- Matt Bahr
- Patrick Bailey
- Rodney Bailey
- Dallas Baker
- John Baker
- Tim Baker
- Lou Baldacci
- Kalen Ballage
- Gary Ballman
- Bob Balog
- John Banaszak
- Warren Bankston
- Zach Banner
- Pete Barbolak
- Ed Barker
- Johnnie Barnes
- Reggie Barnes
- Tom Barnett
- Mark Barron
- Fred Barry
- Earl Bartlett
- Mike Basrak
- Dick Bassi
- Baron Batch
- Charlie Batch
- Marco Battaglia
- Arnaz Battle
- Ainsley Battles
- Kelvin Beachum
- Byron Beams
- Tom Beasley
- Chuck Beatty
- Ed Beatty
- Wayland Becker
- Mark Behning
- Kendrell Bell
- Le'Veon Bell
- Myron Bell
- Richard Bell
- Theo Bell
- Albert Bentley
- Keeanu Benton
- Mitch Berger
- Nat Berhe
- Ed Bernet
- Jordan Berry
- Greg Best
- Jerome Bettis
- Tom Bettis
- Frank Billock
- Craig Bingham
- John Binotto
- Beanie Bishop
- Don Bishop
- Harold Bishop
- Charlie Bivins
- Yahya Black
- Todd Blackledge
- Will Blackwell
- Antwon Blake
- Brian Blankenship
- Greg Blankenship
- Rocky Bleier
- LeGarrette Blount
- Mel Blount
- Fred Bohannon
- Rocky Boiman
- Nick Bolkovac
- Rink Bond
- Ernie Bonelli
- Steve Bono
- Jon Bostic
- Chris Boswell
- Kirk Botkin
- Emil Boures
- Tony Bova
- R. J. Bowers
- Bill Bowman
- Sam Boyd
- Brandon Boykin
- Miles Boykin
- Jim Boyle
- Ed Bradley
- Charlie Bradshaw
- Jim Bradshaw
- Terry Bradshaw
- Jeff Brady
- Pat Brady
- Art Brandau
- Jim Brandt
- Maury Bray
- Bill Breeden
- Rod Breedlove
- Gene Breen
- Jeep Brett
- Pete Brewster
- Bubby Brister
- Jessie Britt
- Ralph Britt
- Antoine Brooks
- Barrett Brooks
- Tony Brooks-James
- Fred Broussard
- Angelo Brovelli
- Anthony Brown
- Antonio Brown
- Chad Brown
- Chris Brown
- Curtis Brown
- Dante Brown
- Dave Brown
- Dee Brown
- Ed Brown
- Ernie Brown
- J. B. Brown
- John Brown
- Justin Brown
- Kris Brown
- Lance Brown
- Larry Brown
- Tom Brown
- Hank Bruder
- Carson Bruener
- Mark Bruener
- Boyd Brumbaugh
- Jim Brumfield
- Dewey Brundage
- Fred Bruney
- John Bruno
- Corbin Bryant
- Fernando Bryant
- Hubie Bryant
- Martavis Bryant
- Ray Bucek
- Brentson Buckner
- Carl Buda
- Isaiah Buggs
- Rudy Bukich
- Randy Bullock
- Amos Bullocks
- John Burleson
- Joe Burnett
- Len Burnett
- Morgan Burnett
- Tom Burnette
- Artie Burns
- John Burrell
- Plaxico Burress
- Devin Bush Jr.
- Bill Butler
- Cannonball Butler
- Crezdon Butler
- Drew Butler
- Jack Butler
- Frank Bykowski

== C ==
- Deon Cain
- Ralph Calcagni
- Dean Caliguire
- Jack Call
- Lee Calland
- Chris Calloway
- Tom Calvin
- Paul Cameron
- Bob Campbell
- Dick Campbell
- Don Campbell
- Glenn Campbell
- John Campbell
- Leon Campbell
- Russ Campbell
- Scott Campbell
- Kameron Canaday
- Wayne Capers
- Dick Capp
- Mac Cara
- Joe Cardwell
- Preston Carpenter
- Tariq Carpenter
- Gregg Carr
- Chris Carter
- Rodney Carter
- Tyrone Carter
- Keith Cash
- Cy Casper
- Sebastian Castro
- Mark Catano
- John Cenci
- Garth Chamberlain
- Lynn Chandnois
- Taco Charlton
- Ernie Cheatham
- Ed Cherry
- Chuck Cherundolo
- Anthony Chickillo
- Dick Christy
- Joe Cibulas
- Ben Ciccone
- Gene Cichowski
- Gus Cifelli
- Bob Cifers
- Jim Clack
- Kendrick Clancy
- Chuck Clark
- James Clark
- Mike Clark
- Reggie Clark
- Ryan Clark
- Spark Clark
- John Clay
- Chase Claypool
- Harvey Clayton
- Henry Clement
- Johnny Clement
- Jackie Cline
- Tony Cline Jr.
- Joey Clinkscales
- Sammie Coates
- Marvin Cobb
- Ross Cockrell
- Nakia Codie
- Ricardo Colclough
- Mason Cole
- Robin Cole
- Terry Cole
- Andre Coleman
- Mike Collier
- Reggie Collier
- Willie Colon
- Craig Colquitt
- Dustin Colquitt
- Chris Combs
- Tony Compagno
- Dick Compton
- Merl Condit
- Steve Conley
- Dick Conn
- Mike Connelly
- James Conner
- Chris Conrad
- Dylan Cook
- Joe Coomer
- Adrian Cooper
- Marquis Cooper
- Sam Cooper
- Lou Cordileone
- Anthony Corley
- Bob Coronado
- Thomas Cosgrove
- Jerricho Cotchery
- Russ Cotton
- Steve Courson
- Brad Cousino
- Rashaad Coward
- Russ Craft
- Bill Cregar
- Carl Crennel
- Larry Critchfield
- Win Croft
- Da'Mon Cromartie-Smith
- Marshall Cropper
- Bennie Cunningham
- Roy Curry
- Matt Cushing
- Randy Cuthbert

== D ==
- Bernard Dafney
- Anthony Daigle
- Ted Dailey
- Jordan Dangerfield
- Willie Daniel
- James Daniels
- Charles Davenport
- Najeh Davenport
- Bill Davidson
- Kenny Davidson
- Art Davis
- Bob Davis
- Bruce Davis
- Carey Davis
- Carlos Davis
- Charlie Davis
- Dave Davis
- Henry Davis
- Jesse Davis
- Lorenzo Davis
- Paul Davis
- Russell Davis
- Sam Davis
- Sean Davis
- Steve Davis
- Travis Davis
- Tommy Dawkins
- Dermontti Dawson
- Len Dawson
- Nick DeCarbo
- Art DeCarlo
- David DeCastro
- Jonathan Dekker
- Jack Deloplaine
- George Demko
- Jack Dempsey
- Carmine DePascal
- Henry DePaul
- Dean Derby
- Darrell Dess
- Buddy Dial
- Charlie Dickey
- Mark Didio
- Johnnie Dirden
- Dennis Dixon
- Joshua Dobbs
- John Dockery
- Dale Dodrill
- Les Dodson
- John Doehring
- Chris Doering
- Cliff Dolaway
- Dick Dolly
- Al Donelli
- Rick Donnalley
- Thom Dornbrook
- Kevin Dotson
- Forrest Douds
- Bob Dougherty
- Bob Douglas
- Dick Doyle
- Ted Doyle
- Al Drulis
- Rick Druschel
- Bill Dudley
- Roger Duffy
- Len Dugan
- Kyle Dugger
- Paul Duhart
- Craig Dunaway
- Tony Dungy
- David Dunn
- Gary Dunn
- Bud Dupree
- Bill Dutton
- Jonathan Dwyer

== E ==
- Nick Eason
- Vic Eaton
- Eric Ebron
- Brandin Echols
- Terry Echols
- Shayne Edge
- Terrell Edmunds
- Trey Edmunds
- Dave Edwards
- Glen Edwards
- Troy Edwards
- Daniel Ekuale
- Donnie Elder
- DeShon Elliott
- Jalen Elliott
- Jayrone Elliott
- Jim Elliott
- Swede Ellstrom
- Leo Elter
- Carlos Emmons
- Paul Engebretsen
- Rick Engles
- Rich Erenberg
- Paul Ernster
- Trai Essex
- Tim Euhus
- Donald Evans
- Jon Evans
- Ray Evans
- Thomas Everett

== F ==
- Alan Faneca
- Hebron Fangupo
- John Farquhar
- Venice Farrar
- Scrapper Farrell
- James Farrior
- Ta'ase Faumui
- Troy Fautanu
- Nick Feher
- Matt Feiler
- Bob Ferguson
- Lou Ferry
- John Fiala
- Justin Fields
- Ralph Fife
- Deon Figures
- Dan Fike
- Frank Filchock
- Jim Finks
- B. J. Finney
- Doug Fisher
- Ev Fisher
- Ray Fisher
- Max Fiske
- Dez Fitzpatrick
- Minkah Fitzpatrick
- Dick Flanagan
- Lethon Flowers
- Tre Flowers
- Fred Foggie
- Lee Folkins
- Vern Foltz
- Larry Foote
- Darryl Ford
- Henry Ford
- Moses Ford
- Todd Fordham
- L. J. Fort
- John Foruria
- Barry Foster
- Ramon Foster
- Sid Fournet
- Keyaron Fox
- Sam Francis
- Andre Frazier
- Zach Frazier
- Lorenzo Freeman
- Pat Freiermuth
- Ernest French
- Len Frketich
- Chris Fuamatu-Maʻafala
- Dick Fugler
- Randy Fuller
- Ed Fullerton
- John Fuqua
- Steve Furness

== G ==
- Bobby Gage
- Larry Gagner
- Wentford Gaines
- Kenneth Gainwell
- Kendall Gammon
- Wayne Gandy
- Bob Gaona
- Chris Gardocki
- Bill Garnaas
- Reggie Garrett
- Gregg Garrity
- Terence Garvin
- Keith Gary
- Joe Gasparella
- William Gay
- Cory Geason
- Byron Gentry
- Zach Gentry
- Matt George
- Roy Gerela
- Joe Geri
- Oliver Gibson
- Justin Gilbert
- Marcus Gilbert
- Ulysees Gilbert
- Johnny Gildea
- Jason Gildon
- Scoop Gillespie
- Joe Gilliam
- David Gilreath
- Jug Girard
- Joe Glamp
- Glenn Glass
- Fred Glatz
- Gary Glick
- Clark Goff
- Markus Golden
- Robert Golden
- George Gonda
- Pete Gonzalez
- John Goodman
- John Goodson
- Walt Gorinski
- Preston Gothard
- Cornell Gowdy
- Ted Grabinski
- Bruce Gradkowski
- Neil Graff
- Jeff Graham
- Kenny Graham
- Kent Graham
- Thomas Graham Jr.
- Doran Grant
- Gordon Gravelle
- Tom Graves
- Derwin Gray
- Sam Gray
- Bobby Joe Green
- Chaz Green
- Eric Green
- Isaiah Green
- Kendrick Green
- Ladarius Green
- Joe Greene
- Kevin Greene
- Tracy Greene
- Norm Greeney
- L. C. Greenwood
- Larry Griffin
- Xavier Grimble
- Tyler Grisham
- Earl Gros
- Randy Grossman
- Bob Gunderman
- Riley Gunnels

== H ==
- Elmer Hackney
- Joe Haden
- Joe Haeg
- Clark Haggans
- Mike Haggerty
- Byron Haines
- Russell Hairston
- Dick Haley
- Delton Hall
- Ron Hall
- Alan Haller
- Jack Ham
- Cobi Hamilton
- Casey Hampton
- Bob Hanlon
- Craig Hanneman
- Terry Hanratty
- Swede Hanson
- Javon Hargrave
- Derrick Harmon
- Billy Harris
- Franco Harris
- Josh Harris
- Lou Harris
- Najee Harris
- Ryan Harris
- Tim Harris
- Arnold Harrison
- Bob Harrison
- James Harrison
- Malik Harrison
- Nolan Harrison
- Reggie Harrison
- Jeff Hartings
- Howard Hartley
- Justin Hartwig
- Pressley Harvin III
- Carlton Haselrig
- J. C. Hassenauer
- Andre Hastings
- Courtney Hawkins
- Jerald Hawkins
- Greg Hawthorne
- Henry Hayduk
- Jonathan Hayes
- Rudy Hayes
- Verron Haynes
- George Hays
- Ken Hebert
- Bill Hegarty
- Paul Held
- Warren Heller
- Jon Henderson
- Dick Hendley
- Kevin Henry
- Mike Henry
- Urban Henry
- Dick Hensley
- Ken Henson
- Anthony Henton
- Nate Herbig
- Nick Herbig
- Noah Herron
- Cameron Heyward
- Connor Heyward
- Darrius Heyward-Bey
- Red Hickey
- Alex Highsmith
- Derek Hill
- Harlon Hill
- Jim Hill
- Jerry Hillebrand
- Tony Hills
- John Hilton
- Mike Hilton
- Glen Ray Hines
- Bryan Hinkle
- Mike Hinnant
- Hal Hinte
- Chuck Hinton
- Claude Hipps
- Joe Hoague
- Dick Hoak
- Devlin Hodges
- Bob Hoel
- Dave Hoffmann
- Darrell Hogan
- Merril Hoge
- Bob Hohn
- Chris Hoke
- Cole Holcomb
- Tex Holcomb
- Ed Holler
- Corey Holliday
- Joe Hollingsworth
- Tony Holm
- Walt Holmer
- Earl Holmes
- Ernie Holmes
- Melvin Holmes
- Santonio Holmes
- Johnny Holton
- Frank Hood
- Ziggy Hood
- Chris Hope
- Bill Hornick
- Garry Howe
- Glen Howe
- Cal Hubbard
- Chris Hubbard
- Gene Hubka
- Alan Huff
- David Hughes
- Dennis Hughes
- Dick Hughes
- George Hughes
- Art Hunter
- Justin Hunter
- Richard Huntley

== I ==
- Godwin Igwebuike
- Tunch Ilkin
- Melvin Ingram
- Jack Itzel
- Corey Ivy
- Mortty Ivy
- Pop Ivy
- Chidi Iwuoma
- George Izo

== J ==
- Myles Jack
- Alonzo Jackson
- Donte Jackson
- Earnest Jackson
- John Jackson
- Josh Jackson
- Lenzie Jackson
- Dan James
- Jesse James
- D'Shawn Jamison
- Clarence Janecek
- Val Jansante
- Toimi Jarvi
- Ralph Jecha
- Roy Jefferson
- Van Jefferson
- Tom Jelley
- A. J. Jenkins
- John Jenkins
- Tony Jeter
- Bill Johnson
- Brandon Johnson (born 1983)
- Brandon Johnson (born 1998)
- Buddy Johnson
- Charles Johnson
- D. J. Johnson
- David Johnson
- Diontae Johnson
- Jason Johnson
- John Henry Johnson
- Jovon Johnson
- Kaleb Johnson
- Kyron Johnson
- Malcolm Johnson
- Norm Johnson
- Ron Johnson
- Steven Johnson
- Tim Johnson
- Troy Johnson
- Will Johnson
- Cameron Johnston
- Rex Johnston
- Swede Johnston
- Aaron Jones
- Art Jones
- Broderick Jones
- Bruce Jones
- Donta Jones
- Felix Jones
- Gary Jones
- George Jones
- Jacoby Jones
- Jamir Jones
- Jarvis Jones
- Landry Jones
- Mike Jones
- Tevin Jones
- Victor Jones
- Darin Jordan
- Tim Jorden
- Karl Joseph

== K ==
- Royal Kahler
- George Kakasic
- Dave Kalina
- Todd Kalis
- John Kapele
- Jeremy Kapinos
- John Karcis
- Ed Karpowich
- Ted Karras
- George Kavel
- Damontae Kazee
- Tom Keating
- Brett Keisel
- Craig Keith
- Marv Kellum
- Jim Kelly
- Kameron Kelly
- Chad Kelsay
- Mose Kelsch
- Chris Kemoeatu
- Jack Kemp
- Ray Kemp
- John Kenerson
- Gary Kerkorian
- Brady Keys
- Walt Kichefski
- Max Kielbasa
- Walt Kiesling
- George Kiick
- Miles Killebrew
- Pat Killorin
- Frank Kimble
- Carlos King
- Desmond King
- Phil King
- Mark Kirchner
- Ken Kirk
- Levon Kirkland
- Travis Kirschke
- Ed Kissell
- Earl Klapstein
- Dick Klein
- John Klumb
- Daryl Knox
- Bob Kohrs
- Jon Kolb
- Elmer Kolberg
- Chris Kolodziejski
- John Kondrla
- Ken Kortas
- Julie Koshlap
- Rich Kotite
- Martin Kottler
- Matt Kranchick
- Dan Kreider
- Joe Kresky
- Clint Kriewaldt
- Bill Krisher
- Mike Kruczek
- Joe Krupa
- Larry Krutko
- John Kuhn
- Christian Kuntz
- Justin Kurpeikis
- Roy Kurrasch
- Zvonimir Kvaternik
