= Pittsburgh Steelers all-time roster (L–Z) =

1,653 players have appeared in at least one regular season or postseason game in the National Football League (NFL) for the Pittsburgh Steelers franchise since 1933. This list includes those whose last names fall between "L" and "Z". For the rest of the players, see Pittsburgh Steelers all-time roster (A–K). This list is accurate through the end of the 2025 NFL season.

== L ==
- Steve Lach
- Dave LaCrosse
- Pete Ladygo
- Bill Lajousky
- Carnell Lake
- Joe Lamas
- Frank Lambert
- Jack Lambert
- Mose Lantz
- Chuck Lanza
- Dan LaRose
- Lou Lassahn
- Dick Lasse
- Johnny Lattner
- Hubbard Law
- Ben Lawrence
- Bobby Layne
- Justin Layne
- Paul Lea
- Bob Leahy
- Jerry Leahy
- DeMarvin Leal
- Bernie Lee
- Danzell Lee
- Greg Lee
- Herman Lee
- Jack Lee
- Logan Lee
- Dick Leftridge
- Byron Leftwich
- John Leglue
- Doug Legursky
- Ray Lemek
- Eku Leota
- Tim Lester
- John Letsinger
- Lou Levanti
- Jim Levey
- Frank Lewis
- Joe Lewis
- Keenan Lewis
- Roy Lewis
- Dave Liddick
- Mike Lind
- Louis Lipps
- Gene Lipscomb
- David Little
- Carl Littlefield
- Greg Lloyd
- Charles Lockett
- Chuck Logan
- Mike Logan
- Stefan Logan
- Bill Long
- Terry Long
- Ken Longenecker
- Don Looney
- John Lott
- Isaiahh Loudermilk
- Duval Love
- Dean Lowry
- Jackie Lowther
- Dick Lucas
- Jeff Lucas
- John Lucente
- Bobby Luna
- Booth Lusteg
- Mitch Lyons

== M ==
- Red Mack
- Rico Mack
- Bill Mackrides
- Tommy Maddox
- Anthony Madison
- Mike Magac
- Sean Mahan
- Frank Maher
- John Malecki
- Joe Malkovich
- Fran Mallick
- Mark Malone
- Jim Mandich
- Ray Mansfield
- Eggs Manske
- Rod Manuel
- Bobby Maples
- Joe Maras
- Basilio Marchi
- Ted Marchibroda
- Jerry Marion
- Harry Marker
- Jeff Markland
- Cassius Marsh
- Curtis Marsh Sr.
- Paul Martha
- Brodric Martin
- Tee Martin
- Vern Martin
- Blake Martinez
- Grant Mason
- Bob Masters
- John Mastrangelo
- Tyler Matakevich
- Ed Matesic
- Joe Matesic
- Ray Mathews
- Ricardo Mathews
- Terance Mathis
- Frank Mattioli
- Marv Matuszak
- Arthur Maulet
- Johnny Maxey
- Alvin Maxson
- Ray May
- Lindy Mayhew
- Alvoid Mays
- Lee Mays
- Jerry Mazzanti
- Fred McAfee
- Ryan McBean
- Mat McBriar
- Dick McCabe
- Art McCaffray
- Brice McCain
- Don McCall
- Cy McClairen
- Ray-Ray McCloud
- Willie McClung
- Ryan McCollum
- Dewey McConnell
- Mason McCormick
- Jamie McCoy
- Matt McCrane
- Daniel McCullers
- Hugh McCullough
- Karl McDade
- Jim McDonald
- Shaun McDonald
- Vance McDonald
- Coley McDonough
- Paul McDonough
- Bryant McFadden
- Marshall McFadden
- Marv McFadden
- Anthony McFarland Jr.
- Ben McGee
- Rob McGovern
- Tyrone McGriff
- Sean McHugh
- Tim McKyer
- Steve McLendon
- John McMakin
- Johnny "Blood" McNally
- Ed McNamara
- Bill McPeak
- Shorty McWilliams
- Ed Meadows
- Bryant Meeks
- Charley Mehelich
- Steve Meilinger
- Rashard Mendenhall
- Jamon Meredith
- Elmer Merkovsky
- Mike Merriweather
- Zoltán Meskó
- Max Messner
- DK Metcalf
- Dennis Meyer
- Ron Meyer
- Bill Michael
- Lou Michaels
- Art Michalik
- Kelvin Middleton
- Lou Midler
- Eddie Miles
- Anthony Miller
- Heath Miller
- Jim Miller
- Josh Miller
- Scotty Miller
- Ernie Mills
- Henry Minarik
- Tom Miner
- Gene Mingo
- Frank Minini
- Michael Minter
- Mike Mitchell
- Arthur Moats
- Dick Modzelewski
- Ed Modzelewski
- Dicky Moegle
- Tony Momsen
- Donte Moncrief
- Henry Mondeaux
- Jeremiah Moon
- Bucky Moore
- Dan Moore
- Lance Moore
- Mewelde Moore
- Red Moore
- Gonzalo Morales
- Sean Morey
- Bobby Morgan
- Quincy Morgan
- Tom Moriarty
- Earl Morrall
- Bam Morris
- Jack Morris
- Steve Morse
- Rick Moser
- Clure Mosher
- Norm Mosley
- Paul Moss
- Marion Motley
- Buster Mott
- Derek Moye
- Mike Mularkey
- Lee Mulleneaux
- Gerry Mullins
- Ryan Mundy
- Dick Murley
- Tyler Murphy
- Earl Murray
- Tom Myslinski

== N ==
- Gern Nagler
- John Naioti
- Richard Nardi
- Keanu Neal
- Bill Nelsen
- Darrell Nelson
- Edmund Nelson
- Steven Nelson
- Carl Nery
- Tom Newberry
- Harry Newsome
- Armand Niccolai
- Allen Nichols
- Bob Nichols
- Lew Nichols III
- Elbie Nickel
- Hardy Nickerson
- George Nicksich
- John Nisby
- Kent Nix
- Roosevelt Nix
- Mike Nixon
- Mathias Nkwenti
- Leo Nobile
- Terry Nofsinger
- John Noppenberg
- Tre Norwood
- John Nosich
- Buzz Nutter
- Jerry Nuzum

== O ==
- Fran O'Brien
- Jack O'Brien
- Mel Odelli
- Henry Odom
- Neil O'Donnell
- John Oehler
- John Oelerich
- Ade Ogundeji
- Larry Ogunjobi
- Chukky Okobi
- Chukwuma Okorafor
- Chris Oldham
- Ray Oldham
- Dan O'Leary
- Stan Olejniczak
- Clancy Oliver
- Qadree Ollison
- Jerry Olsavsky
- Al Olszewski
- Gunner Olszewski
- Joe O'Malley
- Bob O'Neil
- Dave Opfar
- Bo Orlando
- Jimmy Orr
- Chuck Ortmann
- Terry O'Shea
- Paul Oswald
- Esezi Otomewo
- Darrick Owens

== P ==
- Lonnie Palelei
- Michael Palmer
- Tom Palmer
- George Papach
- Frank Parker
- Willie Parker
- Jeremy Parquet
- James Parrish
- Frank Pastin
- John Patrick
- Billy Patterson
- Cordarrelle Patterson
- David Paulson
- Stan Pavkov
- Scott Paxson
- Clarence Peaks
- Barry Pearson
- Preston Pearson
- Andrus Peat
- Erric Pegram
- Leon Pense
- Jabrill Peppers
- John Perko
- Darren Perry
- Lowell Perry
- John Petchel
- Ted Petersen
- Patrick Peterson
- Todd Peterson
- Pepper Petrella
- George Pickens
- Kenny Pickett
- James Pierre
- Joe Pierre
- Roger Pillath
- Ed Pine
- Ray Pinney
- Rocco Pirro
- Swede Pittman
- George Platukis
- Frank Pokorny
- Troy Polamalu
- Frank Pollard
- Leonard Pope
- John Popovich
- Daryl Porter Jr.
- Joey Porter
- Joey Porter Jr.
- Al Postus
- Hank Poteat
- Myron Pottios
- Bill Potts
- Ernie Pough
- Maurkice Pouncey
- Shar Pourdanesh
- Tim Powell
- John Powers
- Bill Priatko
- MyCole Pruitt
- Rollin Putzier

== Q ==
- Jess Quatse
- Patrick Queen
- Jerry Quick
- Mike Quinn

== R ==
- Buster Raborn
- Kevin Rader
- Alex Rado
- George Rado
- Vincent Ragunas
- Chris Rainey
- Peter Rajkovich
- Jalen Ramsey
- Antwaan Randle El
- Walter Rasby
- Leo Raskowski
- Randy Rasmussen
- Keiwan Ratliff
- Eric Ravotti
- Israel Raybon
- Dave Reavis
- Bert Rechichar
- Isaac Redman
- Jeff Reed
- Malik Reed
- Dan Reeder
- Jerry Reese
- John Reger
- Willie Reid
- Will Renfro
- Joe Repko
- Jared Retkofsky
- Randy Reutershan
- Billy Reynolds
- Jim Reynolds
- Jon Rhattigan
- Don Rhodes
- Dave Ribble
- Perry Richards
- Daryl Richardson
- Huey Richardson
- Terry Richardson
- Rock Richmond
- Tom Ricketts
- Stevan Ridley
- Jay Riemersma
- John Rienstra
- Dick Riffle
- Avon Riley
- Cameron Riley
- Elijah Riley
- Gabriel Rivera
- Elandon Roberts
- Jack Roberts
- Adrian Robinson
- Allen Robinson
- Ed Robinson
- Gil Robinson
- Jack Robinson
- Mark Robinson
- Mike Rodak
- Mark Rodenhauser
- Aaron Rodgers
- John Rodgers
- Ben Roethlisberger
- Fran Rogel
- Cullen Rogers
- Eli Rogers
- Jim Rorison
- Oliver Ross
- Allen Rossum
- Pete Rostosky
- Tom Rouen
- Eric Rowe
- Bob Rowley
- John Rowser
- Mark Royals
- Orpheus Roye
- Aubrey Rozzell
- Mason Rudolph
- Guy Ruff
- Ernie Ruple
- Darius Rush
- Andy Russell
- Gary Russell
- Ed Ryan

== S ==
- Troy Sadowski
- Johnny Sample
- Asante Samuel Jr.
- Don Samuel
- Jaylen Samuels
- Carl Samuelson
- Lupe Sanchez
- Sandy Sandberg
- Dick Sandefur
- Chuck Sanders
- Emmanuel Sanders
- Jack Sanders
- Curt Sandig
- Mike Sandusky
- Theron Sapp
- Bill Saul
- Syl Saumer
- Weslye Saunders
- Jack Sawyer
- Charley Scales
- Tegray Scales
- Jack Scarbath
- Max Scharping
- Bernie Scherer
- John Schiechl
- John Schmidt
- Bob Schmitz
- Mike Schneck
- Bob Schnelker
- Joe Schobert
- Karl Schuelke
- Eberle Schultz
- Elmer Schwartz
- John Schweder
- Nick Sciba
- Josh Scobee
- Glenn Scolnik
- Chad Scott
- Chris Scott
- Delontae Scott
- Jonathan Scott
- Trent Scott
- Wilbert Scott
- Joe Scudero
- Todd Seabaugh
- Charley Seabright
- Ray Seals
- Leon Searcy
- Mike Sebastian
- Richard Seigler
- Warren Seitz
- Coty Sensabaugh
- Daniel Sepulveda
- Trey Sermon
- Isaac Seumalo
- Brent Sexton
- Al-Hajj Shabazz
- George Shaffer
- Aaron Shampklin
- Ronnie Shanklin
- Rick Sharp
- Bobby Shaw
- Ryan Shazier
- Chris Sheffield
- Donnie Shell
- Richard Shelton
- Charlie Shepard
- Stan Sheriff
- Bob Sherman
- Burrell Shields
- Scott Shields
- Dick Shiner
- Jerry Shipkey
- Bill Shockley
- Jim Shorter
- Bret Shugarts
- Hubert Shurtz
- Don Shy
- John Simerson
- Tracy Simien
- Milt Simington
- Jason Simmons
- Jerry Simmons
- Kendall Simmons
- Bob Simms
- John Simon
- Jackie Simpson
- Tim Simpson
- Darryl Sims
- Steven Sims
- Frank Sinkovitz
- George Sirochman
- Vincent Sites
- Paul Skansi
- Joe Skladany
- Nick Skorich
- Ed Skoronski
- Ben Skowronek
- Walt Slater
- Darius Slay
- Alex Smail
- Fred Small
- Wendell Smallwood
- Aaron Smith
- Anthony Smith
- Ben Smith
- Billy Ray Smith Sr.
- Bobby Smith
- Dave Smith
- Jim Smith
- Jonnu Smith
- Kevin Smith
- Laverne Smith
- Marvel Smith
- Preston Smith
- Ron Smith
- Steve Smith
- Stu Smith
- Truett Smith
- JuJu Smith-Schuster
- Benny Snell
- Ray Snell
- Bill Snyder
- John Sodaski
- Bob Soleau
- Ariel Solomon
- George Somers
- Ross Sorce
- Bill Sortet
- Frank Souchak
- Matt Spaeth
- Chad Spann
- Sean Spence
- Todd Spencer
- Robert Spillane
- Jack Spinks
- Brian St. Pierre
- Jeremy Staat
- Jon Staggers
- Brenden Stai
- Duce Staley
- John Stallworth
- Ronald Stanley
- Jack Stanton
- Darnell Stapleton
- Rohn Stark
- Max Starks
- Ben Starret
- Larry Station
- Ernie Stautner
- Joel Steed
- Ron Stehouwer
- Brian Stenger
- Paul Stenn
- Jamain Stephens
- LaRod Stephens-Howling
- Kordell Stewart
- John Stock
- Mark Stock
- Ed Stofko
- Dwight Stone
- Cliff Stoudt
- Glen Stough
- Tyronne Stowe
- Eli Strand
- Rick Strom
- George Strugar
- Art Strutt
- Dan Stryzinski
- Justin Strzelczyk
- Russell Stuvaints
- Steve Suhey
- Shaun Suisham
- George Sulima
- Bob Sullivan
- Chandon Sullivan
- Chris Sullivan
- Frank Sullivan
- Frank Summers
- Don Sutherin
- Cameron Sutton
- Ricky Sutton
- John Swain
- Lynn Swann
- Limas Sweed
- Calvin Sweeney
- Jim Sweeney
- Ryan Switzer
- Willie Sydnor
- Stevenson Sylvester
- Walt Szot

== T ==
- Bill Tanguay
- George Tarasovic
- Ben Tate
- Jess Tatum
- Ike Taylor
- Jim Taylor
- Mike Taylor
- Lou Tepe
- Nat Terry
- Ray Tesser
- Larry Tharpe
- Adam Thielen
- Yancey Thigpen
- Ben Thomas
- Cam Thomas
- Clendon Thomas
- J. T. Thomas
- Matthew Thomas
- Shamarko Thomas
- Donnel Thompson
- Leroy Thompson
- Tommy Thompson
- Trenton Thompson
- Tuffy Thompson
- Weegie Thompson
- Juan Thornhill
- Sidney Thornton
- Morgan Tiller
- Lawrence Timmons
- Sid Tinsley
- George Titus
- Si Titus
- Jordan Todman
- Loren Toews
- Lou Tomasetti
- Andy Tomasic
- Mike Tomczak
- Dick Tomlinson
- Clarence Tommerson
- John Tosi
- Erik Totten
- Fitzgerald Toussaint
- Deshea Townsend
- Tom Tracy
- Cory Trice
- David Trout
- Mitchell Trubisky
- Lou Tsoutsouvas
- Anthony Tuggle
- Stephon Tuitt
- Jerame Tuman
- Dan Turk
- John Turley
- Trai Turner
- Derrek Tuszka
- Rich Tylski
- Tim Tyrrell

== V ==
- Marquez Valdes-Scantling
- Zack Valentine
- Bruce Van Dyke
- DeMarcus Van Dyke
- Nick Vannett
- Frank Varrichione
- Harp Vaughan
- Elton Veals
- Craig Veasey
- Fernando Velasco
- Ross Ventrone
- Michael Vick
- Josh Victorian
- Vic Vidoni
- Alejandro Villanueva
- Keydrick Vincent
- Shawn Vincent
- Kimo von Oelhoffen
- Lloyd Voss
- Mike Vrabel

== W ==
- Bob Wade
- Tommy Wade
- Mike Wagner
- Corliss Waitman
- Bobby Walden
- Mykal Walker
- Sammy Walker
- Cody Wallace
- Levi Wallace
- Mike Wallace
- Ray Wallace
- Rian Wallace
- Bill Walsh
- L. T. Walton
- Hines Ward
- Jonathan Ward
- Buzz Warren
- Greg Warren
- Jaylen Warren
- Xavier Warren
- Anthony Washington
- Clarence Washington
- Darnell Washington
- Dewayne Washington
- James Washington
- Nate Washington
- Robert Washington
- Sam Washington
- Tom Watkins
- Allan Watson
- Sid Watson
- Terrell Watson
- Derek Watt
- T. J. Watt
- Armon Watts
- B. W. Webb
- Elnardo Webster
- George Webster
- Mike Webster
- Tad Weed
- Henry Weinberg
- Izzy Weinstock
- Heinie Weisenbaugh
- Billy Wells
- Joe Wendlick
- Ralph Wenzel (born 1918)
- Ralph Wenzel (born 1943)
- Jamaal Westerman
- Ed Westfall
- Buzz Wetzel
- Markus Wheaton
- Ernie Wheeler
- Tommy Whelan
- Guy Whimper
- Byron White
- Cody White
- Dwight White
- Paul White
- Kerrith Whyte
- Joe Wiehl
- Paul Wiggins
- J. R. Wilburn
- Solomon Wilcots
- J. J. Wilcox
- Jack Wiley
- Eric Wilkerson
- Bert Williams
- Dave Williams
- DeAngelo Williams
- Don Williams
- Eric Williams
- Erwin Williams
- Gerald Williams
- Jerrol Williams
- Joe Williams (born 1915)
- Joe Williams (born 1965)
- John Williams
- Ke'Shawn Williams
- Mike Williams
- Ray Williams
- Robert Williams
- Rodney Williams
- Sid Williams
- Vince Williams
- Warren Williams
- Willie Williams
- Avery Williamson
- Fred Williamson
- Keith Willis
- Billy Wilson
- Cedrick Wilson Sr.
- Frank Wilson
- Kion Wilson
- Payton Wilson
- Quincy Wilson
- Roman Wilson
- Russell Wilson
- Chuck Winfrey
- Brad Wing
- Blake Wingle
- Dennis Winston
- Stefen Wisniewski
- Ahkello Witherspoon
- Mike Withycombe
- Jon Witman
- Jim Wolf
- Craig Wolfley
- Will Wolford
- Joe Womack
- Ken Woodard
- David Woodley
- LaMarr Woodley
- Dwayne Woodruff
- Al Woods
- Donovan Woods
- Rick Woods
- Marv Woodson
- Rod Woodson
- Donnell Woolford
- Jason Worilds
- Tim Worley
- Chris Wormley
- John Woudenberg
- Junior Wren
- Renell Wren
- Matthew Wright
- Al Wukits
- Frank Wydo

== Y ==
- Al Young
- Dick Young
- Theo Young
- Walter Young
- Paul "Tank" Younger
- John Yurchey

== Z ==
- Silvio Zaninelli
- Amos Zereoué
- Jeff Zgonina
- Joe Zombek
- Frank Zoppetti
