= Pittsburgh Steelers all-time roster =

The Pittsburgh Steelers all-time roster is split by name into the following two lists:

- Pittsburgh Steelers all-time roster (A–K)
- Pittsburgh Steelers all-time roster (L–Z)
