= IUP =

IUP may refer to:

- Indiana University of Pennsylvania, a public research university in Indiana County, Pennsylvania
  - IUP Crimson Hawks, the intercollegiate athletic program of the above school
- IUP Portfolio, a Swedish short for individual development plan
- IUP (software), a computer software that provides a portable, scriptable toolkit for GUI building.
- Industrial Union Party
- Interconnect User Part, UK specific SS7 protocol
- Inter-University Program for Chinese Language Study at Tsinghua University
- Intrauterine Pregnancy, the normal location for a pregnancy to occur
- Intrinsically unstructured protein
- Irish Unionist Party, an alternate name for the Irish Unionist Alliance, a political party founded in 1891.
- Initial Upper Paleolithic, the earliest culture of modern humans in Europe
