= Rod Woodson =

American football player and coach (born 1965)

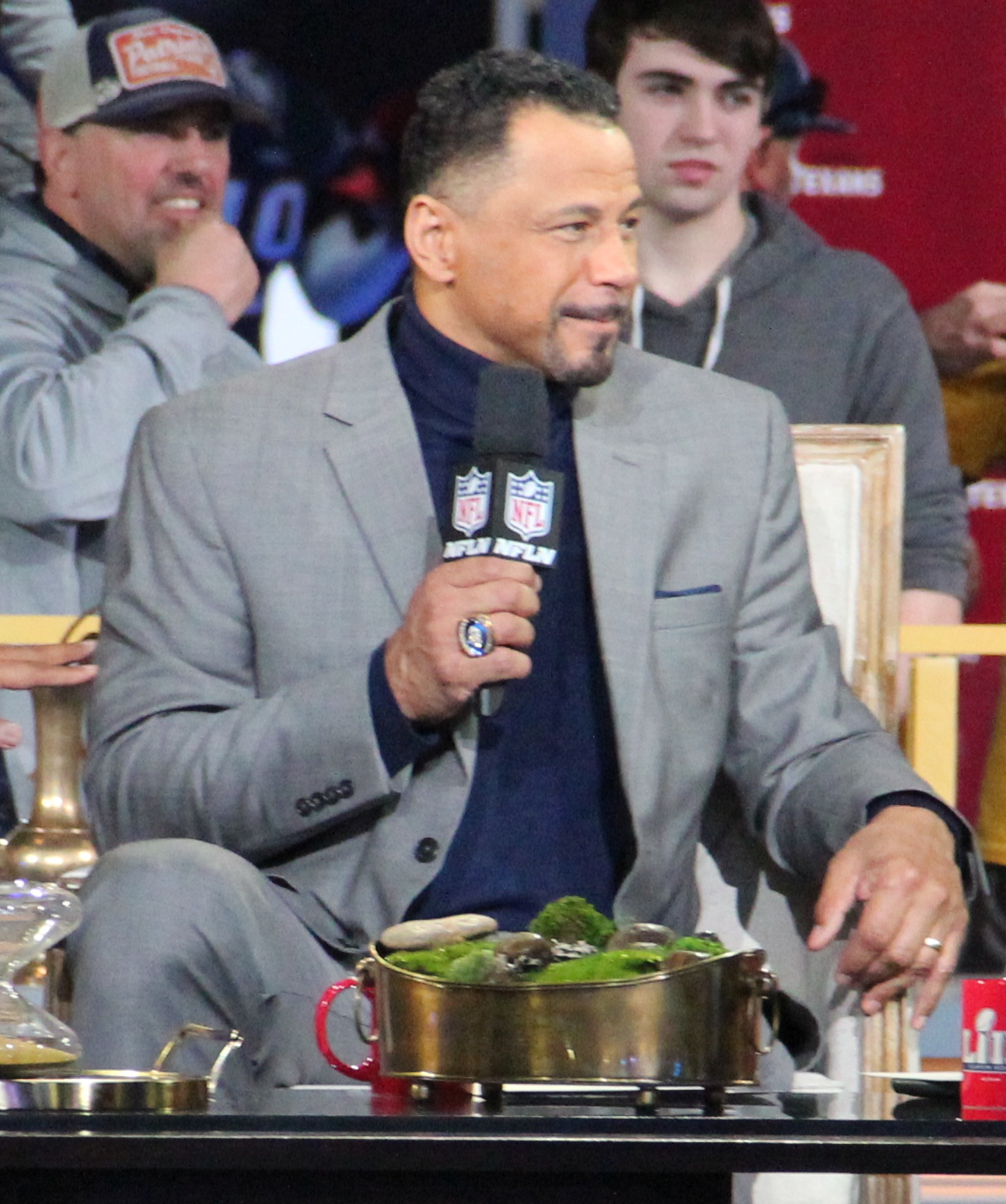
- Woodson in 2019

No. 26
- Positions: Cornerback, safety

Personal information
- Born: March 10, 1965 (age 61); Fort Wayne, Indiana, U.S.
- Listed height: 6 ft 0 in (1.83 m)
- Listed weight: 200 lb (91 kg)

Career information
- High school: R. Nelson Snider (Fort Wayne)
- College: Purdue (1983–1986)
- NFL draft: 1987: 1st round, 10th overall pick

Career history

Playing
- Pittsburgh Steelers (1987–1996); San Francisco 49ers (1997); Baltimore Ravens (1998–2001); Oakland Raiders (2002–2003)

Coaching
- Cincinnati Bengals (2010) Coaching intern - Bill Walsh minority coaching fellowship program; Oakland Raiders (2011) Cornerbacks coach; Denver Broncos (2014) Coaching intern - Bill Walsh minority coaching fellowship program; Oakland Raiders (2015–2016) Assistant defensive backs coach; Oakland Raiders (2017) Cornerbacks coach; Vegas Vipers (2023) Head coach & general manager

Awards and highlights
- Super Bowl champion (XXXV); NFL Defensive Player of the Year (1993); 6× First-team All-Pro (1989, 1990, 1992–1994, 2002); 3× Second-team All-Pro (1991, 1996, 2000); 11× Pro Bowl (1989–1994, 1996, 1999–2002); 2× NFL interceptions leader (1999, 2002); NFL 1990s All-Decade Team; NFL 75th Anniversary All-Time Team; NFL 100th Anniversary All-Time Team; Pittsburgh Steelers All-Time Team; Pittsburgh Steelers Hall of Honor; Consensus All-American (1986); First-team All-American (1985); 3× First-team All-Big Ten (1984–1986); NFL records: Most career interceptions returned for touchdown: 12; Most total defensive touchdowns: 13 (tied with Darren Sharper and Charles Woodson)

Career NFL statistics
- Tackles: 1,158
- Interceptions: 71
- Touchdowns: 17
- Forced fumbles: 20
- Sacks: 13.5
- Stats at Pro Football Reference
- Pro Football Hall of Fame
- College Football Hall of Fame

Roderick Kevin Woodson (born March 10, 1965) is an American former professional football player for 17 seasons in the National Football League (NFL). Widely considered one of the greatest cornerbacks of all time, Woodson holds the NFL record for fumble recoveries (32) by a defensive player, and interceptions returned for a touchdown (12). He was named the NFL Defensive Player of the Year in 1993.

Woodson played college football for the Purdue Boilermakers, earning consensus All-American honors in 1986. He was selected by the Pittsburgh Steelers in the first round of the 1987 NFL draft and played his first 10 years there. He was also a key member of the Baltimore Ravens' Super Bowl XXXV championship team. He had two shorter stints for the San Francisco 49ers and two seasons with the Oakland Raiders. His 71 career interceptions are the third most in NFL history. He was an inductee of the Class of 2009 of the Pro Football Hall of Fame in Canton, Ohio on August 8, 2009. Woodson was inducted into the College Football Hall of Fame in 2016. He played most of his career as a cornerback then switched to safety during the later part of his career. Woodson was most recently the head coach of the XFL's Vegas Vipers.

From his retirement in 2003 to February 2011, Woodson worked as an analyst for the NFL Network (on NFL Total Access and Thursday Night Football) and for the Big Ten Network. He spent the 2011 season as the Raiders' cornerbacks coach. He then returned to broadcasting, working for Westwood One as an analyst on college football (2012) and the NFL (2013) before resuming his coaching career in 2014. He was announced in July 2022 as the Ravens' new radio color commentator beginning with the upcoming season.

== College career ==
Woodson accepted a full scholarship to play football at Purdue University, in part because of a desire to pursue a degree in electrical engineering. He played primarily as a cornerback and kick returner, but also saw time on offense as a running back and wide receiver. He was named an All-American cornerback in 1985 and 1986; he was named an All-American returner in 1986 and was a three-time All-Big Ten first team selection.

In his final collegiate game, Woodson gained over 150 combined rushing and receiving yards, in addition to making ten tackles and forcing a fumble, leading Purdue to a victory over arch-rival Indiana.

Woodson left Purdue with 13 individual records, tying the school record with 11 career interceptions, which he returned for 276 yards and three touchdowns. He currently is ranked in the top ten in career interceptions, solo tackles, total tackles, passes deflected, and kickoff return yardage (1,535 yards) as a Boilermaker.

Woodson was inducted into the Purdue Intercollegiate Athletics Hall of Fame in 2003.

On December 11, 2014, the Big Ten Network included Woodson on "The Mount Rushmore of Purdue Football", as chosen by online fan voting. Woodson was joined in the honor by Drew Brees, Bob Griese, and Leroy Keyes.

On January 8, 2016, Woodson was selected for induction in the College Football Hall of Fame.

=== Track and field ===
Woodson was also an accomplished track and field athlete for the Purdue Boilermakers track and field team, and was twice awarded All-America honors. He finished second at the 1985 NCAA Division I Indoor Track and Field Championships in the 55 meter hurdles and third at the 1987 NCAA Division I Indoor Track and Field Championships in the 55 meter hurdles. Woodson held the NCAA 60 meter hurdles record for 10 years. As of January 2009, he still holds the school records in both the 60 and 110 meter hurdles. He earned five Big Ten championships while at Purdue. In 1984, he qualified for the Olympic Trials in the 110 meter hurdles, but elected to continue his football career in the NFL after graduating from Purdue with a degree in criminal justice.

==== Personal bests ====
Event	Time (seconds)	Venue	Date
60 meter hurdles	7.61	Indianapolis, Indiana	March 7, 1987
60 meters	6.70	Ypsilanti, Michigan	February 14, 1987
100 meters	10.26	Champaign, Illinois	May 29, 1987
110 meter hurdles	13.29	Irvine, California	June 14, 1987

== Professional career ==
Pre-draft measurables
Height	Weight	Arm length	Hand span	40-yard dash	10-yard split	20-yard split	20-yard shuttle	Vertical jump	Broad jump	Bench press
6 ft 0 in (1.83 m)	202 lb (92 kg)	31 in (0.79 m)	10 1/2 in (0.27 m)	4.29 s	1.51 s	2.51 s	3.98 s	36.0 in (0.91 m)	10 ft 5 in (3.18 m)	10 reps
All values from NFL Combine

=== Pittsburgh Steelers ===
Woodson in 2006 wearing his Steelers jersey while participating in the ESPN Pro Bowl Skills Challenge during Pro Bowl weekend.

The Pittsburgh Steelers selected Woodson in the first round (10th overall) of the 1987 NFL draft. Although the Steelers wanted to draft Woodson to help rebuild their secondary, the team expected Woodson to be drafted before their turn at tenth overall. Head coach Chuck Noll instructed defensive coordinator Tony Dungy not to bother with a scouting report on Woodson due to his expected unavailability. However, the Pittsburgh Steelers were able to draft Woodson after the Cleveland Browns traded for the San Diego Chargers' fifth overall pick and subsequently used selection to draft linebacker Mike Junkin. The St. Louis Cardinals drafted Kelly Stouffer (sixth overall) who ultimately never played for the Cardinals due to a contract dispute. The Buffalo Bills were the last likely team to draft Woodson, but instead used the eighth overall pick to draft linebacker Shane Conlan.

==== 1987 ====
Woodson missed training camp due to a contract holdout that lasted 95 days after he was unable to come to terms on a contract with the Steelers. Woodson was a World-Class 110-meter hurdler and ran track on the European track circuit during his contract holdout. Woodson had the fourth fastest 110-meter hurdle time in the world. He won the bronze medal at the 1987 USA Olympic festival, and won medals in several IAAF Grand Prix meetings in Europe. Woodson is one of only two athletes in history to be inducted into the Pro Football Hall of Fame and also earn a world ranking in the high hurdles.

On October 28, 1987, the Pittsburgh Steelers signed Woodson to a four-year, $1.80 million contract that includes a signing bonus of $700,000. Woodson's contract holdout was the longest in the Pittsburgh Steelers' franchise history, until Le'Veon Bell withheld the entire 2018 NFL season.

On November 8, 1987, Woodson made his professional regular season debut in the Pittsburgh Steelers' 17–16 victory at the Kansas City Chiefs in week 8. He finished his debut with two kick returns for 48-yards and two punt returns for 12-yards. On November 22, 1987, Woodson made his first career interception off a pass from Bengals' quarterback Boomer Esiason and returned it for a 45-yard touchdown during the Steelers' 30–16 win in week 11. It was his first career touchdown. He finished his rookie season in 1987 with 20 combined tackles in eight games and no starts. Woodson also returned 13 kicks for 290-yards (22.3 YPR) and made 16 punt returns for 135-yards (8.4 YPR).

==== 1988 ====
Woodson entered training camp in 1988 slated as the starting cornerback. Head coach Chuck Noll named Woodson a starting cornerback to begin the regular season, opposite fellow cornerback Dwayne Woodruff. Woodson also retained kick and punt return duties in 1988. On October 9, 1988, Woodson returned a kick for a 92-yard touchdown during a 31–14 loss to the Phoenix Cardinals in week 6. The touchdown was the first kick return touchdown of his career. In week 12, Woodson made his first career sack on Browns' quarterback Bernie Kosar in the Steelers' 27–7 loss to the Cleveland Browns. Woodson started in all 16 games in 1988 and recorded 88 combined tackles, four interceptions, and was credited with half a sack. He also returned 37 kicks for 850-yards and a touchdown (22.9 YPR) and 33 punts for 281-yards (8.5 YPR).

==== 1989 ====
On January 3, 1989, Pittsburgh Steelers' defensive coordinator Tony Dungy announced his resignation after they finished with a 5–11 record the previous season. The Steelers also fired four assistant coaches.

Woodson and Dwayne Woodruff returned as the Steelers' starting cornerback tandem in 1989. On November 19, 1989, Woodson returned a kickoff for an 84-yard touchdown during a 20–17 win against the San Diego Chargers. Woodson started 15 games in 1989 and recorded 80 combined tackles and three interceptions. He also returned 36 kickoffs for 982-yards (27.2 YPR) and one touchdown and had 29 punt returns for 207-yards (7.1 YPR). The Pittsburgh Steelers finished the season third in the AFC Central with a 9–7 record and earned a wildcard berth. On December 31, 1989, Woodson started in his first career playoff game and had four kick returns for 74-yards during a 26–23 victory at the Houston Oilers in the AFC Wildcard Game. The following week, the Steelers were eliminated from the playoffs after losing 24–23 to the Denver Broncos in the AFC Divisional Round.

==== 1990 ====
The Pittsburgh Steelers promoted linebackers coach Dave Brazil to defensive coordinator after Rod Rust accepted the head coaching position with the New England Patriots. Head coach Chuck Noll retained Woodson as a starting cornerback in 1990, opposite D.J. Johnson.

On September 16, 1990, Woodson returned a punt from Oilers' punter Greg Montgomery for a 52-yard touchdown during a 20–9 victory against the Houston Oilers, marking the first punt return for a touchdown in his career. On December 6, 1990, the Pittsburgh Steelers reportedly offered Woodson a three-year, $3 million contract extension. That contract would make Woodson the highest paid player in team history. On December 20, 1990, it was announced that Woodson was selected to play in the 1991 Pro Bowl. Woodson started in all 16 games in 1990 and recorded 66 combined tackles and five interceptions. He was voted first-team All-Pro in 1990. Woodson had 35 kick returns for 764 return yards (21.8 YPR) and 38 punt returns for 398 return yards and a touchdown (10.4 YPR).

==== 1991 ====
Woodson and D.J. Johnson returned as the starting cornerback tandem in 1991. Woodson was inactive for the Steelers' week 13 victory against the Houston Oilers due to an injury. On November 28, 1991, Woodson recorded his first career solo sack on Cowboys' quarterback Steve Beuerlein in the Steelers' 20–10 loss to the Dallas Cowboys. On December 27, 1991, Pittsburgh Steelers' head coach Chuck Noll announced his decision to retire after the Steelers finished with a 7–9 record in 1991. He started in 15 games in 1991 and recorded 73 combined tackles, 3 interceptions, and a sack. He also returned 44 kicks for 880 return yards (22.0 YPR) and had 28 punt returns for 320-yards (11.4 YPR).

==== 1992 ====
On January 21, 1992, the Pittsburgh Steelers announced the hiring of former Kansas City Chiefs' defensive coordinator Bill Cowher as their new head coach. On January 31, 1992, Cowher announced the hiring of former New Orleans Saints' secondary coach Dom Capers as their new defensive coordinator.

On May 19, 1992, it was reported that Woodson was one of nine NFL players to sue the National Football League for unrestricted free agency. Other players included Steve Beuerlein (Cowboys), Bobby Hebert (Saints), D. J. Dozier (Lions), Scott Mitchell (Dolphins), Jeff Dellenbach (Dolphins), Seth Joyner (Eagles), Clyde Simmons (Eagles), and Kevin Ross (Chiefs). Head coach Bill Cowher retained Woodson and D.J. Johnson as the starting cornerback tandem in 1992.

He started in the Pittsburgh Steelers' season-opener against the Houston Oilers and made two interceptions off pass attempts by Oilers' quarterback Warren Moon in their 29–24 victory. On October 25, 1992, Woodson returned a punt for an 80-yard touchdown as the Steelers defeated the Kansas City Chiefs 27–3. On November 1, 1992, Woodson delivered a hit to Oilers' quarterback Warren Moon on a cornerback blitz during a 21–20 win against the Houston Oilers in week 8. The hit gave Moon a concussion and forced him to leave the game. In week 14, he made a career-high two sacks on Bears' quarterback Jim Harbaugh during a 30–6 loss to the Chicago Bears. On December 24, 1992, it was announced that Woodson was selected to play in the 1993 Pro Bowl. He started in all 16 games in 1992 and recorded 100 combined tackles, a career-high six sacks, and four interceptions.

==== 1993 ====
On March 1, 1993, the NFL implemented unrestricted free agency. Woodson received a $1.11 million settlement from the league after being one of 15 plaintiffs to sue the league in a class action antitrust lawsuit.

Woodson and D.J. Johnson returned as the starting cornerback tandem for the fourth consecutive season and started alongside safeties Darren Perry and Carnell Lake. He started in the Pittsburgh Steelers' season-opener at the San Francisco 49ers and intercepted two passes by quarterback Steve Young in their 24–13 victory.

On September 18, 1993, the Pittsburgh Steelers signed Woodson to a four-year, $12 million contract. The contract made Woodson the NFL's highest paid defensive back. In week 4, he made two interceptions off passes by Falcons' quarterbacks Bobby Hebert and Billy Joe Tolliver during a 45–17 victory against the Atlanta Falcons. On October 17, 1993, Woodson intercepted two passes by Saints' quarterback Wade Wilson and returned one for a 63-yard touchdown in the Steelers' 37–14 win against the New Orleans Saints. Woodson started in all 16 games in 1993 and recorded 95 combined tackles, a career-high eight interceptions, two sacks, and a touchdown. He also made 15 kick returns for 294 return yards (19.6 YPR) and 42 punt returns for 338 return yards (8.0 YPR). He was also named NFL Defensive Player of the Year.

==== 1994 ====
Woodson returned as the No. 1 starting cornerback in 1994, opposite Deon Figures. He played under defensive coordinator Dom Capers and assistant coaches Dick LeBeau and Marvin Lewis. On November 14, 1994, Woodson intercepted pass by Bills' quarterback Jim Kelly and returned it for a 37-yard touchdown in the first quarter of the Steelers' 23–10 win against the Buffalo Bills in week 11. Woodson started in 15 games in 1994 and recorded 67 tackles, four interceptions, three sacks, and two touchdowns. He also made 15 kick returns for a total of 365 return yards (24.3 YPR) and 39 punt returns for 319 return yards (8.1 YPR).

==== 1995 ====
On January 26, 1995, the Pittsburgh Steelers promoted defensive backs coach Dick LeBeau to defensive coordinator after Dom Capers accepted the head coaching position with the Carolina Panthers.

Woodson started as the No.1 cornerback to begin the 1995 regular season, alongside Willie Williams. On September 3, 1995, Woodson sustained a torn ACL when his foot got caught in the artificial turf at Three Rivers Stadium when he attempted to change direction and arm tackle Detroit Lions' running back Barry Sanders in the first quarter of the Pittsburgh Steelers' season-opening 23–20 victory against the Detroit Lions. Steelers' safety Carnell Lake replaced Woodson at cornerback during his injury hiatus. On September 11, 1995, Woodson underwent reconstructive surgery and had his ACL in his left knee replaced with a patella tendon from his right knee.

The Pittsburgh Steelers finished first in the AFC Central with an 11–5 record and earned a first round bye. They defeated the Buffalo Bills 40–21 in the AFC Divisional Round and defeated the Indianapolis Colts 20–16 in the AFC Championship Game. On January 28, 1996, Woodson made his return from injury and played in Super Bowl XXX as the Steelers lost 27–17 to the Dallas Cowboys. Woodson became the first player to return from reconstructive knee surgery in the same season and returned after only 19 weeks. Woodson was limited to 12 snaps in Super Bowl XXX and was primarily used on third down. During the game, he broke up a pass intended for Michael Irvin and immediately hopped up and pointed at his reconstructed knee.

==== 1996 ====
On August 12, 1996, Woodson declined the Pittsburgh Steelers' three-year, $9 million contract extension offer and requested a long-term contract for four or five-years. They went on to offer Woodson a five-year, $10 million contract extension and a five-year, $13.5 million incentive-laden contract with a signing bonus of $500,000 included. Woodson returned as the starting cornerback alongside Willie Williams, but was relieved of kick and punt return duties.

He started for the Pittsburgh Steelers' at the Jacksonville Jaguars and made eight tackles and made an interception in their 24–9 loss. On September 8, 1996, Woodson recorded five combined tackles and returned an interception by Ravens' quarterback Vinny Testaverde 43 yards for a touchdown during a 31–17 win against the Baltimore Ravens in week 2. In week 11, Woodson recorded five combined tackles and made a season-high two interceptions off pass attempts by Bengals' quarterback Jeff Blake during a 34–24 loss to the Cincinnati Bengals. He started in all 16 games in 1996 and recorded 71 combined tackles, six interceptions, a touchdown, and a sack.

The Pittsburgh Steelers finished atop the AFC Central with a 10–6 record. On January 5, 1997, Woodson recorded seven combined tackles in his last appearance as a member of the Pittsburgh Steelers. They went on to lose 28–3 to the New England Patriots in the AFC Divisional Round.

==== Free agency ====
After the 1996 NFL season, the Steelers offered Woodson a four-year, $7.2 million contract with a signing bonus of $1 million. He became an unrestricted free agent in 1997 after he was unable to agree to a contract with the Steelers. He was plagued by injuries in 1996, including a strained Achilles tendon, a sprained knee, and an injury to his back that substantially hurt his value on the free agent market. On April 19, 1997, Woodson declined a four-year, $7 million contract offer from the Steelers hours before the 1997 NFL draft. The Steelers subsequently selected Maryland cornerback Chad Scott in the first round (24th overall) of the 1997 NFL draft and ended negotiations with Woodson.

During the offseason, Woodson held a workout at Purdue that was attended by ten teams interested in signing him, including the San Francisco 49ers, Chicago Bears, Cincinnati Bengals, and Jacksonville Jaguars. The Cincinnati Bengals offered Woodson a three-year contract reportedly worth between $1.5 million and $2 million per season.

=== San Francisco 49ers ===
==== 1997 ====
On July 17, 1997, the San Francisco 49ers signed Woodson to a three-year contract. Head coach Steve Mariucci named Woodson a starting cornerback on the 49ers' depth chart to begin the regular season, opposite Darnell Walker. On September 14, 1997, Woodson recorded two combined tackles, forced a fumble, and made a career-high three interceptions off passes by Saints' quarterback Danny Wuerffel during a 33–7 victory against the New Orleans Saints in week 2. In week 10, he collected a season-high eight combined tackles in the 49ers' 17–10 victory against the Dallas Cowboys. He started in 14 games in 1997 and recorded 48 combined tackles, three interceptions, and a forced fumble.

The San Francisco 49ers finished first in the NFC West with a 13–3 record and earned a first round bye. They defeated the Minnesota Vikings 38–22 in the NFC Divisional Round. The following week, Woodson made four combined tackles as the 49ers were defeated by the defending Super Bowl champion Green Bay Packers 23–10. On February 9, 1998, the San Francisco 49ers cut Woodson and former Steelers' teammate Kevin Greene in an effort to free up salary cap space.

=== Baltimore Ravens ===
==== 1998 ====
On February 21, 1998, the Baltimore Ravens signed Woodson to a three-year, $5.70 million contract that includes a signing bonus of $3 million. Woodson was reunited with Ravens' defensive coordinator Marvin Lewis who was a linebacker coach for the Pittsburgh Steelers.

Head coach Ted Marchibroda named Woodson a starting cornerback to begin the regular season, alongside Duane Starks. On September 4, 1998, it was reported that Woodson entered stage 1 of the league's substance abuse program after refusing to take a drug test the previous month. It was reported that Woodson became infuriated after he was randomly selected to take a drug test on two consecutive days. His refusal automatically counted as a failed test although he subsequently relented and passed the test the next day.

On September 13, 1998, Woodson recorded a season-high 11 combined tackles, made two interceptions, and returned one for a touchdown during a 24–10 win at the New York Jets in week 2. Woodson intercepted a pass by Jets' quarterback Glenn Foley, that was intended for wide receiver Dedric Ward, and returned it for a 60-yard touchdown in the fourth quarter. On November 8, 1998, Woodson made five combined tackles and returned an interception for a touchdown during the Ravens' 13–10 win against the Oakland Raiders. Woodson intercepted a pass by Raiders' quarterback Donald Hollas, that was intended for wide receiver Tim Brown, and returned it for an 18-yard touchdown in the first quarter. He started in all 16 games in 1998 and recorded 88 combined tackles, six interceptions, and two touchdowns. On December 28, 1998, the Baltimore Ravens fired head coach Ted Marchibroda after the Ravens finished the season with a 6–10 record.

==== 1999 ====
On January 19, 1999, the Baltimore Ravens hired former Minnesota Vikings' offensive coordinator Brian Billick as their new head coach. Billick retained Marvin Lewis as the Baltimore Ravens' defensive coordinator and hired Mike Smith, Jack Del Rio, and Rex Ryan as defensive position coaches. Defensive coordinator Marvin Lewis opted to move Woodson to free safety after the Baltimore Ravens drafted cornerback Chris McAlister in the first round (10th overall) of the 1999 NFL draft. Woodson was named the starting free safety and was used to make checks in coverage and help stabilize a young secondary that also included cornerbacks Duane Starks and strong safety Kim Herring.

On November 7, 1999, Woodson recorded two combined tackles and returned an interception for a touchdown during a 41–9 win at the Cleveland Browns. Woodson intercepted a pass by Browns' backup quarterback Ty Detmer and returned it for a 66-yard touchdown in the fourth quarter. In week 11, he made four combined tackles and made his 50th career interception off a pass by Bengals' quarterback Jeff Blake during a 34–31 victory at the Cincinnati Bengals. On December 5, 1999, Woodson made eight combined tackles and returned an interception for a touchdown in the Ravens' 41–14 win against the Tennessee Titans. Woodson intercepted a pass by Titans' quarterback Steve McNair, that was intended for wide receiver Kevin Dyson, and returned it for a 47-yard touchdown in the fourth quarter. In week 14, he got nine combined tackles during a 31–24 win at the Pittsburgh Steelers. He started in all 16 games in 1999 and recorded 66 combined tackles, seven interceptions, and two touchdowns.

==== 2000 ====
Woodson and Kim Herring returned as the starting safety tandem in 2000. Woodson became the veteran presence and a mentor to a young secondary. In Week 6, he made three tackles and an interception during a 15–10 win at the Jacksonville Jaguars. It became his third consecutive game with an interception. In Week 17, he got 11 combined tackles and forced a fumble in the Ravens' 34–20 win against the New York Jets. On December 14, 2000, Woodson was selected to the 2001 Pro Bowl, marking the 10th Pro Bowl selection of his career. Woodson started in all 16 games in 2000 and recorded 74 combined tackles, four interceptions, and two forced fumbles.

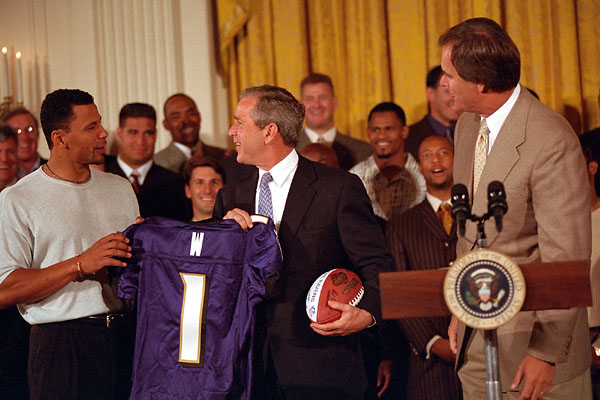
Woodson presenting President George W. Bush with a Ravens jersey, following their win in Super Bowl XXXV

The Baltimore Ravens finished second in the AFC Central with a 12–4 record and defeated the Denver Broncos 21–3 in the AFC Wild Card Round. On January 7, 2001, Woodson recorded 11 combined tackles in the Ravens' 24–10 win at the Tennessee Titans in the AFC Divisional Round. The following week, the Ravens went on to defeat the Oakland Raiders 16–3 in the AFC Championship Game. On January 28, 2001, Woodson recorded six combined tackles as the Ravens defeated the New York Giants 34–7 in Super Bowl XXXV.

==== 2001 ====
On March 1, 2001, Woodson was one of seven players released by the Baltimore Ravens. He became an unrestricted free agent after the Baltimore Ravens declined an option to retain him. On May 7, 2001, the Baltimore Ravens signed Woodson to a five-year contract. Head coach Brian Billick retained Woodson as the starting free safety. Woodson started alongside strong safety Corey Harris in 2001.

In week 4, he collected a season-high ten combined tackles and made an interception during a 26–7 win against the Tennessee Titans. On December 2, 2001, Woodson made two combined tackles and returned an interception for a touchdown in the Ravens' 39–27 win against the Indianapolis Colts in week 12. Woodson intercepted a pass by Colts' quarterback Peyton Manning, that was intended for wide receiver Marvin Harrison, and returned it for a 47-yard touchdown in the fourth quarter. He started in all 16 games in 2001 and recorded 74 combined tackles, three interceptions, forced a fumble, and scored a touchdown. The Baltimore Ravens finished second in their division with a 10–6 record, but were eliminated from the playoffs after a 27–10 loss at the Pittsburgh Steelers in the AFC Divisional Round. Woodson finished the game with ten combined tackles (eight solo) and a pass deflection against his former team.

On February 29, 2002, the Baltimore Ravens released Woodson in a salary cap related maneuver.

=== Oakland Raiders ===
On May 1, 2002, the Oakland Raiders signed Woodson to a six-year contract. Head coach Bill Callahan named Woodson the starting free safety to begin the regular season, alongside strong safety Derrick Gibson.

On September 28, 2002, Woodson recorded four combined tackles, three interceptions, and returned one for a touchdown in the Raiders' 52–25 win against the Tennessee Titans. He intercepted a pass by Titans' quarterback Steve McNair, that was intended for tight end Frank Wycheck, and returned it for an 82-yard touchdown in the third quarter. On November 11, 2002, Woodson recorded four combined tackles, deflected a pass, and returned an interception for the final touchdown of his career in the Raiders' 34–10 win at the Denver Broncos in week 9. Woodson intercepted a pass by Broncos' quarterback Brian Griese, that was originally intended for running back Clinton Portis, and returned it for a 98-yard touchdown in the second quarter. He started in all 16 games in 2002 and recorded 82 combined tackles (70 solo), a career-high eight interceptions, seven pass deflections, and two touchdowns. On January 2, 2002, it was announced that Woodson was selected to play in the 2002 Pro Bowl.

The Oakland Raiders finished first in the AFC West with an 11–5 record and earned a first round bye. They reached Super Bowl XXXVII after defeating the New York Jets 30–10 in the AFC Divisional Round and defeating the Tennessee Titans 41–24 in the AFC Championship Game. On January 26, 2003, Woodson recorded eight combined tackles and deflected a pass as the Raiders lost Super Bowl XXXVII 48–21 to the Tampa Bay Buccaneers.

==== 2003 ====
Woodson and Derrick Gibson returned as the starting safety duo in 2003. In week 3, he tallied nine combined tackles during a 31–10 loss at the Denver Broncos. On November 16, 2003, Woodson made five combined tackles, deflected two passes, and made the last interception of his career during a 28–18 win against the Minnesota Vikings. His final interception came off a pass by Vikings' quarterback Daunte Culpepper. On November 26, 2003, the Oakland Raiders placed Woodson on injured reserve due to a chronic injury to his left knee. He underwent surgery the following month. Woodson finished the season with 51 combined tackles (40 solo), two interceptions, and a pass deflection in ten games and ten starts.

==== 2004 ====
On July 28, 2004, the Oakland Raiders released Woodson after he failed a physical after undergoing knee surgery.

=== NFL records and accomplishments ===
Woodson honored on the Raymond James Stadium video board as a Pro Football Hall of Fame inductee during Super Bowl XLIII in 2009.

Woodson is among the NFL's all-time leaders in games played as a defensive back. In his 17 NFL seasons, Woodson recorded 71 interceptions, 1,483 interception return yards, 32 fumble recoveries (15 offensive and 17 defensive), 137 fumble return yards, 4,894 kickoff return yards, 2,362 punt return yards, and 17 touchdowns (12 interception returns, 1 fumble return, 2 kickoff returns, 2 punt returns). He holds the league record for interceptions returned for touchdown with 12, and is tied with 11 other players for the record for most fumble recoveries in a single game (3). His 1,483 interception return yards is the second most in NFL history (Ed Reed has 1,590 yards). His 32 fumble recoveries are a record among defensive players. His 71 interceptions rank third all time.

Woodson was named to the Pro Bowl 11 times, a record for his position. He was also the first player to earn trips to the Pro Bowl at cornerback, safety and kick returner. He was named 1993's NFL Defensive Player of the Year by the Associated Press. He was also a 7-time All-Pro selection. Woodson finished second to Darrell Green in the 1988 NFL Fastest Man Contest.

In 1994, he was named to the NFL's 75th Anniversary Team, one of only five active players to be named to the team. The others were Jerry Rice, Joe Montana, Reggie White and Ronnie Lott. In 1999, he was ranked number 87 on The Sporting News' list of the 100 Greatest Football Players. The College Football News also honored him as one of the 100 greatest players of the 20th century.

In 2007, he was ranked number 22 on USA Today list of the 25 best NFL players of the past 25 years.

On January 31, 2009, Woodson was elected to the Pro Football Hall of Fame in his first year of eligibility. Woodson named his friend and business associate Tracy Foster as his presenter. Foster runs Woodson's car dealership in Pittsburgh.

== Coaching career ==
Woodson coached the defense at Valley Christian Senior High in Dublin, California along with former Raider John Parrella. He was also the head coach of the women's Varsity Basketball team.

The Raiders hired Woodson as their cornerbacks coach on February 14, 2011. He (along with most of Hue Jackson's Raiders staff) was not retained following the 2011 season. On June 12, 2013, the Pittsburgh Steelers announced that Woodson would be serving as an intern coach. On February 9, 2015, it was announced that Woodson would be returning to the Raiders as an assistant defensive backs coach under head coach Jack Del Rio, defensive coordinator Ken Norton Jr. and defensive backs coach Marcus Robertson. On March 9, 2017, following Robertson's firing earlier that offseason, Woodson was promoted back to cornerbacks coach alongside new safeties coach Brent Vieselmeyer. Woodson was fired following the 2017 season, after Jon Gruden was hired as head coach.

On April 13, 2022, Woodson was announced as one of the eight head coaches for the 2023 season of the XFL. Later on, it was revealed that he would coach the relocated Vegas Vipers. After a 2–8 season in 2023, the Vipers and Woodson agreed to part ways on June 11, 2023.

== Head coaching record ==
=== XFL ===
Team	Year	Regular season				Postseason			
Team	Year	Won	Lost	Win %	Finish	Won	Lost	Win %	Result
LV	2023	2	8	.200	4th XFL North	—	—	—	—
Total		2	8	.200		—	—	—	

== NFL career statistics ==
Legend
	NFL Defensive Player of the Year
	Won the Super Bowl
	NFL record
	Led the league
**Bold**	Career high

=== Regular season ===
Year	Team	GP	Tackles				Interceptions				Fumbles				Punt returns					Kickoff returns				
Year	Team	GP	Comb	Solo	Ast	Sack	Int	Yds	TD	PD	FF	FR	Yds	TD	Ret	Yds	Avg	Lng	TD	Ret	Yds	Avg	Lng	TD
1987	PIT	8	20	—	—	0.0	1	45	1	—	0	2	0	0	16	135	8.4	20	0	13	290	22.3	36	0
1988	PIT	16	88	—	—	0.5	4	98	0	—	1	3	2	0	33	281	8.5	28	0	37	850	23.0	**92**	**1**
1989	PIT	15	80	—	—	0.0	3	39	0	—	**4**	**4**	1	0	29	207	7.1	20	0	36	**982**	**27.3**	84	**1**
1990	PIT	16	66	—	—	0.0	5	67	0	—	**4**	1	0	0	38	**398**	10.5	52	**1**	35	764	21.8	49	0
1991	PIT	15	71	—	—	1.0	3	72	0	—	1	3	15	0	28	320	**11.4**	40	0	**44**	880	20.0	47	0
1992	PIT	16	**100**	—	—	**6.0**	4	90	0	—	**4**	1	9	0	32	364	**11.4**	**80**	**1**	25	469	18.8	32	0
1993	PIT	16	95	—	—	2.0	8	138	1	—	2	1	0	0	**42**	338	8.0	39	0	15	294	19.6	44	0
1994	PIT	15	83	67	16	3.0	4	109	2	—	3	1	0	0	39	319	8.2	42	0	15	365	24.3	54	0
1995	PIT	1	1	0	1	0.0	—	—	—	—	—	—	—	—	—	—	—	—	—	—	—	—	—	—
1996	PIT	16	67	57	10	1.0	6	121	1	—	0	3	42	**1**	—	—	—	—	—	—	—	—	—	—
1997	SF	14	48	43	5	0.0	3	81	0	—	1	1	0	0	1	0	0.0	0	0	—	—	—	—	—
1998	BAL	16	88	**76**	12	0.0	6	108	2	—	—	—	—	—	—	—	—	—	—	—	—	—	—	—
1999	BAL	16	65	53	12	0.0	7	195	**2**	**18**	0	2	0	0	2	0	0.0	7	0	—	—	—	—	—
2000	BAL	16	77	67	10	0.0	4	20	0	10	2	3	4	0	—	—	—	—	—	—	—	—	—	—
2001	BAL	16	76	56	**20**	0.0	3	57	1	12	1	1	0	0	—	—	—	—	—	—	—	—	—	—
2002	OAK	16	82	70	12	0.0	**8**	**225**	**2**	16	0	3	**64**	0	—	—	—	—	—	—	—	—	—	—
2003	OAK	10	51	41	10	0.0	2	18	0	3	0	1	0	0	—	—	—	—	—	—	—	—	—	—
Career		238	1,158	530	108	13.5	71	1,483	12	59	20	32	137	1	260	2,362	9.1	80	2	220	4,894	22.2	92	2

== Personal life ==
Woodson was born in Fort Wayne, Indiana and was the youngest of three siblings, with whom he had close relationships. His father, the late James Woodson, was African American, and his mother, Linda Jo Doerflein, was of German descent. His father was a laborer from Tennessee and his mother worked with the handicapped in Fort Wayne. Woodson attended R. Nelson Snider High School in Fort Wayne, Indiana. His parents married in 1960 and had three sons, Joe, Jamie, and Rod. Woodson was raised in a two-story home in a predominantly black neighborhood. His family experienced harassment through his youth due to their mixed-race.

From 1994 until 2008 Woodson held an annual youth football camp and activities, the Rod Woodson Youth Week, on the grounds of his former high school. This week-long camp featured current and former NFL players mentoring kids on football skills and the importance of education. There was a cheer camp, basketball game, and concert. Woodson funded the majority of the week that also provided academic awards for camp goers and saw hundreds of kids throughout its existence. Woodson was also an outspoken Christian.

Woodson used to split his time between NFL Network studios in Los Angeles, his home in Pleasanton, and a cottage in Coldwater, Michigan. He was also part of the studio team for BBC Sport's NFL coverage in 2007, including Super Bowl XLII and Super Bowl XLIII. In February 2011, he accepted the role as the defensive backs coach of the NFL's Oakland Raiders (his former team).

He played cornerback, safety, and a variety of offensive skill positions and was named Parade and USA Today All-American, all-state his junior and senior seasons. Woodson was named Indiana "Mr. Football" in 1982. In addition to football, he won both the high and low hurdles state championships in both his junior and senior seasons; and played varsity basketball his junior and senior seasons, making all-conference his senior year.

Woodson resides in Pleasanton, California with his wife, Nikki, whom he married in 1992. The couple have five children; two sons and three daughters.

=== Incidents ===
On April 25, 1988, it was reported that Woodson was one of three men arrested for stealing $70 in a tip jar from McCaw's restaurant-bar in West Lafayette, Indiana. Charges were not filed.

On September 23, 1988, Woodson and teammate Delton Hall were involved in a bar fight with another man in Moon Township, Pennsylvania. Police were called to Sessions Bar at 2:34AM due to a fight involving Woodson, Hall, and a man identified as Derrick Wilson. Hall stated the fight began over criticism about football. The rear window of Wilson's vehicle was broken during the altercation, but Woodson agreed to pay for damages. On September 29, 1988, the Pittsburgh Steelers stated both players had been privately reprimanded for their involvement.

On June 13, 1989, Woodson was charged with misdemeanor battery on a police officer after an altercation outside of a bar in Fort Wayne, Indiana.

On May 19, 1992, Woodson was arrested in his hometown of Fort Wayne, Indiana for battery due to an altercation with his brother, Jamie Woodson. On March 24, 1993, Woodson was found not guilty of battery by a jury.
