= Craig Bingham (American football) =

American football player (born 1959)

No. 54, 59
- Position: Linebacker

Personal information
- Born: September 29, 1959 (age 67); Kingston, Jamaica
- Listed height: 6 ft 2 in (1.88 m)
- Listed weight: 218 lb (99 kg)

Career information
- High school: Stamford (Stamford, Connecticut, U.S.)
- College: Syracuse
- NFL draft: 1982: 6th round, 167th overall pick

Career history
- Pittsburgh Steelers (1982–1984); San Diego Chargers (1985); Pittsburgh Steelers (1987)

Career NFL statistics
- Games played: 40
- Games started: 4
- Fumbles recovered: 1
- Kick returns / Yds: 1 / 15
- Stats at Pro Football Reference

Craig Marlon Bingham (born September 26, 1959) is a former American football linebacker who played five seasons in the National Football League (NFL) with the Pittsburgh Steelers and San Diego Chargers. He is distinguished as being the first Jamaican to play in the NFL.

== Early life ==
Bingham was born in Kingston, Jamaica and attended Stamford High School in Stamford, Connecticut.

He matriculated at Syracuse University. His college teammates included future Hall of Famer Art Monk as well as several other future NFL players: Gary Anderson, Joe Morris, Jim Collins, Craig Wolfley, Andrew Gissinger and Bill Hurley.

== Professional career ==
Bingham was selected 167th overall by the Pittsburgh Steelers in the sixth round of the 1982 NFL draft. Over the first two seasons of his career he was used primarily as a special teams player by the Steelers. Early in the 1983 season he suffered a knee injury which was significantly exacerbated in a playoff loss to the Oakland Raiders. The injury was initially thought to be career-ending, but after three surgeries and significant rehab, Bingham was back in time for the 1984 season.

Bingham got his first chance to start in week 14 of the 1984 season against the Houston Oilers due to an injury to Bryan Hinkle. That would turn out to be the only non-strike start of his career.

Bingham was released by the Steelers in September 1985. He was among the team's final cuts in training camp. He was picked up by the San Diego Chargers with whom he was active for eight games in 1985.

Bingham finished his professional career as a replacement player for the Steelers during the 1987 NFL players' strike. He started in all three replacement games, but was once again released once the strike was settled.
