= David Little (linebacker) =

American football player (1959–2005)

No. 50
- Position: Linebacker

Personal information
- Born: January 3, 1959; Miami, Florida, U.S.
- Died: March 17, 2005 (aged 46); Miami, Florida, U.S.
- Listed height: 6 ft 1 in (1.85 m)
- Listed weight: 232 lb (105 kg)

Career information
- High school: Jackson (Miami)
- College: Florida
- NFL draft: 1981: 7th round, 183rd overall pick

Career history
- Pittsburgh Steelers (1981–1992)

Awards and highlights
- Pro Bowl (1990); Consensus All-American (1980); First-team All-SEC (1980); 2× Second-team All-SEC (1978, 1979); University of Florida Athletic Hall of Fame (1991)

Career NFL statistics
- Interceptions: 10
- Sacks: 9
- Fumble recoveries: 11
- Stats at Pro Football Reference

David Lamar Little, Sr. (January 3, 1959 – March 17, 2005) was an American professional football player who was a linebacker for 12 seasons in the National Football League (NFL) during the 1980s and early 1990s. Little played college football for the Florida Gators, earning consensus All-American honors in 1980. Selected late in the seventh round of the 1981 NFL draft, he played for the NFL's Pittsburgh Steelers and became a nine-season starter.

== Early life ==
Little was born in Miami, Florida, in 1959. He attended Andrew Jackson High School in Miami, and was a standout high school football player for the Jackson Generals.

== College career ==
Little accepted an athletic scholarship to attend the University of Florida in Gainesville, Florida, where he played linebacker for coach Doug Dickey and coach Charley Pell's Florida Gators football teams from 1977 to 1980. As a senior team captain in 1980, he helped lead the Gators in the biggest one-year turnaround in the history of NCAA Division I football—from 0–10–1 in 1979 to an 8–4 bowl team in 1980. After the 1980 season, he was a first-team All-Southeastern Conference (SEC) selection, a consensus first-team All-American, and the recipient of the Gators' Fergie Ferguson Award recognizing the "senior football player who displays outstanding leadership, character and courage." He finished his four-year college career with 475 tackles—still the Gators' all-time career record.

Little was inducted into the University of Florida Athletic Hall of Fame as a "Gator Great" in 1991. In one of a series of articles published by The Gainesville Sun in 2006, the Sun sportswriters picked him as No. 18 among the 100 all-time greatest Gator players from the first century of Florida football.

== Professional career ==
Little was chosen in the seventh round (183rd pick overall) of the 1981 NFL draft by the Pittsburgh Steelers, and he played for the Steelers from 1981 to 1992. He was a middle linebacker for the team, at one point starting eighty-nine games in a row. He was selected to the Pro Bowl after the 1990 season. In his twelve-season NFL career, Little appeared in 179 games, started 125 of them, and totaled ten interceptions and eleven recovered fumbles.

== Accidental death ==
Little died on March 17, 2005, as the result of a weight-lifting accident; he was 46 years old. Little suffered from heart disease and experienced a cardiac flutter while lifting weights at his Miami home; he dropped 250 pounds (110 kg) of weights on his chest, which rolled onto his neck and suffocated him.

Little was survived by his wife Denise, their two sons and daughter, his mother, and his older brother, Pro Football Hall of Fame member Larry Little, an All-Pro guard for the Miami Dolphins.

== See also ==
- 1980 College Football All-America Team
- Florida Gators football, 1970–79
- Florida Gators football, 1980–89
- List of Florida Gators football All-Americans
- List of Florida Gators in the NFL draft
- List of Pittsburgh Steelers players
- List of University of Florida alumni
- List of University of Florida Athletic Hall of Fame members
