= Bret Shugarts =

American football player (born 1960)

No. 95
- Position: Defensive end

Personal information
- Born: February 17, 1960 (age 66); DuBois, Pennsylvania, U.S.
- Listed height: 6 ft 2 in (1.88 m)
- Listed weight: 250 lb (113 kg)

Career information
- High school: DuBois
- College: IUP
- NFL draft: 1984: undrafted

Career history
- Pittsburgh Steelers (1984)*; Pittsburgh Steelers (1987)
- * Offseason or practice squad member only
- Stats at Pro Football Reference

J. Bret Shugarts (born February 17, 1960) is an American former professional football player who was a defensive end for the Pittsburgh Steelers of National Football League (NFL). He played college football for the IUP. His Son J. B. Shugarts plays for the Ohio State Buckeyes.
