= IUP Portfolio =

The IUP Portfolio is an education platform for Swedish schools, focused around the students individual development plan and learning portfolio. It is released under the GNU General Public License.

== History ==
In 2006 the Swedish government created a new law. It said that every pupil in K-12 schools, has to have an individual development plan called an IUP (Individuell Utveckling Plan).

This plan's goals are created in twice-yearly talks between the pupil, parent and teacher.

The purpose of having an online IUP is for all parties to be able to access the document at any time and be able to follow up on the goals.

== Goals for the project ==
=== Teacher's view ===
The first thing that a teacher sees is a matrix with students' names in rows and semesters in the columns.

In each cell there is a web form ready to be filled in by a teacher who will write down what was agreed upon during the talks.

==== The form is separated into these questions ====
- Where do we stand now?
- Where are we going?
- How will the home help the student?
- How shall the school help the student?
- What will the student do him or herself?

The result of this form are saved in the pupil's cell in his/her matrix.

There are two basic matrices: one for the teacher to see an overview of all pupils and one for the pupil for his/her IUP and portfolio work.

== Pupil's/parent's view ==
There is a separate login for students above grade 6. Matrix with rows for:

- IUP
- Documents
- Pictures
- Media

Columns again stand for time.

The IUP appears the same way to the pupil or parent as it does for the teacher. The pupil and parent can verify and comment on the IUP from this view.

=== Portfolio ===
The rows for documents, pictures, media allow for uploading, viewing, and sharing, of the digital resources the pupil has gathered during the school year.

== Other tools (in development) ==
=== Calendar ===
The teacher will administer the calendar. The pupil and the parent should see their own activities and those in common for the pupil's class.

=== Chat box ===
The teacher can have communication with the home. There will be a message for the teacher when there is an unanswered message.

== See also ==
- IUP Portfolio Functional Specifications
