= Lorenzo Freeman =

American football player (1964–2016)

No. 68, 75
- Position: Defensive tackle

Personal information
- Born: May 23, 1964; Camden, New Jersey, U.S.
- Died: October 10, 2016 (aged 52); New Kensington, Pennsylvania, U.S.
- Listed height: 6 ft 5 in (1.96 m)
- Listed weight: 270 lb (122 kg)

Career information
- High school: Woodrow Wilson (Camden)
- College: Pittsburgh
- NFL draft: 1987: 4th round, 89th overall pick

Career history
- Green Bay Packers (1987); Pittsburgh Steelers (1987–1990); New York Giants (1991); Minnesota Vikings (1992)

Career NFL statistics
- Sacks: 2.5
- Fumble recoveries: 1
- Stats at Pro Football Reference

Lorenzo Z. Freeman (May 23, 1964 – October 10, 2016) was an American professional football defensive tackle in the National Football League (NFL) from Camden, New Jersey.

He was the 89th draft pick in the fourth round and selected by the Green Bay Packers in 1987. He played five seasons for the Pittsburgh Steelers from 1987 to 1990 and the New York Giants in 1991. He was later a coach for Plum High School.

Freeman was found dead on October 10, 2016. He was only 52.
