= Rodney Carter =

American football player (born 1964)

No. 44, 24
- Position: Running back

Personal information
- Born: October 30, 1964 (age 62); Elizabeth, New Jersey, U.S.
- Listed height: 6 ft 0 in (1.83 m)
- Listed weight: 216 lb (98 kg)

Career information
- High school: Elizabeth
- College: Purdue
- NFL draft: 1986: 7th round, 175th overall pick

Career history
- Pittsburgh Steelers (1986–1989)

Awards and highlights
- First-team All-Big Ten (1985)

Career NFL statistics
- Rushing yards: 244
- Rushing average: 4.7
- Receptions: 86
- Receiving yards: 810
- Touchdowns: 12
- Stats at Pro Football Reference

Rodney Carl Carter (born October 30, 1964) is an American former professional football player who was a running back for three seasons with the Pittsburgh Steelers of the National Football League (NFL) from 1987 to 1989. He played college football for the Purdue Boilermakers and was selected 175th overall by the Steelers in the seventh round of the 1986 NFL draft.

Carter attended Elizabeth High School in Elizabeth and graduated from Purdue University.
