= Tommy Dawkins =

American football player (born 1965)

No. 91
- Position: Defensive end

Personal information
- Born: May 8, 1965 (age 61); Lexington, North Carolina, U.S.
- Listed height: 6 ft 3 in (1.91 m)
- Listed weight: 260 lb (118 kg)

Career information
- High school: Lexington
- College: Appalachian State
- NFL draft: 1987: undrafted

Career history
- San Francisco 49ers (1987)*; Pittsburgh Steelers (1987)
- * Offseason or practice squad member only
- Stats at Pro Football Reference

Tommy Earl Dawkins (born May 8, 1965) is an American former professional football player who was a defensive end for the Pittsburgh Steelers of the National Football League (NFL). He played college football for the Appalachian State Mountaineers.
