= Jim Boyle (American football) =

American football player (born 1961)

No. 65, 77
- Position: Offensive tackle

Personal information
- Born: July 27, 1961 (age 65); Cincinnati, Ohio, U.S.
- Listed height: 6 ft 5 in (1.96 m)
- Listed weight: 270 lb (122 kg)

Career information
- High school: Western Hills (Cincinnati)
- College: Tulane (1980–1983)
- NFL draft: 1984: 9th round, 250th overall pick

Career history
- Miami Dolphins (1984)*; Pittsburgh Steelers (1987–1988); Atlanta Falcons (1989)*
- * Offseason or practice squad member only

Awards and highlights
- First-team All-South Independent (1982)

Career NFL statistics
- Games played: 9
- Games started: 3
- Stats at Pro Football Reference

James Robert Boyle (born July 27, 1961) is an American former professional football player who was an offensive tackle for two seasons with the Pittsburgh Steelers of the National Football League (NFL). Boyle was selected by the Miami Dolphins in the ninth round of the 1984 NFL draft after playing college football for the Tulane Green Wave.

== Early life and college ==
James Robert Boyle was born on July 27, 1961, in Cincinnati, Ohio. He played high school football at Western Hills High School in Cincinnati.

Boyle was a member of the Green Wave of Tulane University from 1980 to 1983 and a three-year letterman from 1981 to 1983. He earned Associated Press first-team All-South Independent honors in 1982.

== Professional career ==
Boyle was selected by the Miami Dolphins in the ninth round, with the 250th overall pick, of the 1984 NFL draft. He officially signed with the team on June 26, 1984. He was released on August 27, 1984.

On September 24, 1987, Boyle signed with the Pittsburgh Steelers during the 1987 NFL players strike. He played in three games, all starts, for the Steelers during the 1987 season and caught one pass before being released on November 3, 1987. He signed with the Steelers again after the season ended on December 30, 1987. Boyle was released on August 30, 1988. He re-signed with the team on September 26, 1988. He appeared in six games for the Steelers, returning one kick for 19 yards, before being released on November 14, 1988.

Boyle signed with the Atlanta Falcons on February 24, 1989, but was released later that year.

== Personal life ==
Boyle later worked for Cincinnati Public Schools and for Cincinnati's Recreation Department.
