= Mel Anderson =

American football player (born 1965)

No. 83
- Positions: Wide receiver, return specialist

Personal information
- Born: August 29, 1965 (age 61)
- Listed height: 5 ft 11 in (1.80 m)
- Listed weight: 175 lb (79 kg)

Career information
- High school: Steel Valley (Munhall, Pennsylvania)
- College: Minnesota (1983–1986)
- NFL draft: 1987: undrafted

Career history
- Kansas City Chiefs (1987)*; Pittsburgh Steelers (1987)
- * Offseason or practice squad member only

Career NFL statistics
- Return yards: 46
- Stats at Pro Football Reference

Melvin Anthony Anderson (born August 29, 1965) is an American former professional football player who was a wide receiver and return specialist in the National Football League (NFL). He played college football for the Minnesota Golden Gophers. He currently coaches an AAU track and field team by the name of Maximum Impact Training in Minneapolis Minnesota.

== Early life ==
Anderson was an all-American athlete in track and field at Steel Valley High School in Munhall, Pennsylvania. In college, he played wide receiver for the Minnesota Golden Gophers football team.

== Professional football career ==
After going undrafted in the 1987 NFL draft, Anderson was signed by the Kansas City Chiefs. He was released before the start of the season, but was signed by the Pittsburgh Steelers. He played in two games as a return specialist, returning seven punts for 38 yards and one kick for eight yards.

== Post-football career ==
In 1999, Anderson founded Track Minnesota Elite, an organization that trains high school track and field athletes to earn college scholarships.

== Personal life ==
Anderson's wife, Lisa, ran track and field at Minnesota. His son, Isaac, played wide receiver at Wisconsin; his daughter, Taylor, ran track and field at UConn; and another daughter, Elise, ran track and field at Illinois State.
