= Ralph Britt =

American football player (born 1965)

No. 86
- Position: Tight end

Personal information
- Born: August 18, 1965 (age 61); Rose Hill, North Carolina, U.S.
- Listed height: 6 ft 3 in (1.91 m)
- Listed weight: 240 lb (109 kg)

Career information
- College: North Carolina State
- NFL draft: 1987: undrafted

Career history
- Pittsburgh Steelers (1987)

Awards and highlights
- Peach Bowl champion (1986)

Career NFL statistics
- Games played: 3
- Stats at Pro Football Reference

Ralph Britt (born August 18, 1965) is an American former professional football player who was a tight end for the Pittsburgh Steelers of the National Football League (NFL). He played college football for the NC State Wolfpack.
