= Jeff Lucas (American football) =

American football player (born 1964)

No. 68
- Position: Offensive tackle

Personal information
- Born: May 30, 1964 (age 62); Hackensack, New Jersey, U.S.
- Listed height: 6 ft 7 in (2.01 m)
- Listed weight: 288 lb (131 kg)

Career information
- High school: Hackensack
- College: West Virginia
- NFL draft: 1987: undrafted

Career history
- Pittsburgh Steelers (1987); Kansas City Chiefs (1989)*; Green Bay Packers (1989)*; Cleveland Browns (1990)*
- * Offseason or practice squad member only

Career NFL statistics
- Games played: 3
- Games started: 3
- Stats at Pro Football Reference

Jeffrey Alan Lucas (born May 30, 1964) is an American former professional football player who was an offensive tackle for the Pittsburgh Steelers of the National Football League (NFL). He played college football for the West Virginia Mountaineers. In his career he played in and started three games for the Steelers in the 1987 season.
