= Charles Lockett =

American football player (born 1965)

No. 89, 83
- Position: Wide receiver

Personal information
- Born: October 1, 1965 (age 61); Los Angeles, California, U.S.
- Listed height: 6 ft 0 in (1.83 m)
- Listed weight: 178 lb (81 kg)

Career information
- High school: Crenshaw (Los Angeles)
- College: Long Beach State (1983–1986)
- NFL draft: 1987: 3rd round, 66th overall pick

Career history
- Pittsburgh Steelers (1987–1988); Washington Redskins (1990)*; New York/New Jersey Knights (1991)
- * Offseason or practice squad member only

Career NFL statistics
- Receptions: 29
- Receiving yards: 481
- Touchdowns: 2
- Stats at Pro Football Reference

Charles Edward Lockett (born October 1, 1965) is an American former professional football player who was a wide receiver for two seasons with the Pittsburgh Steelers of the National Football League (NFL). He was selected by the Steelers in the third round of the 1987 NFL draft after playing college football at Long Beach State University. Lockett was also a member of the New York/New Jersey Knights of the World League of American Football (WLAF).

== Early life and college ==
Charles Edward Lockett was born on October 1, 1965, in Los Angeles, California. He attended Crenshaw High School in Los Angeles.

He played college football for the Long Beach State 49ers of Long Beach State University from 1983 to 1986. He caught seven passes for 99 yards his freshman year in 1983. He totaled 75 receptions for 1,112 yards and four touchdowns in 1984. His receptions total that season was the third-best in the country and second-best in the Pacific Coast Athletic Association (PCAA). Lockett recorded 69 catches for 949 yards and ten touchdowns during the 1985 season, leading the PCAA in all three categories. He caught 40 passes for 742 yards and five touchdowns as a senior in 1986.

== Professional career ==
Lockett was selected by the Pittsburgh Steelers in the third round, with the 66th overall pick, of the 1987 NFL draft. He officially signed with the team on July 20. He played in 11 games, starting one, for the Steelers during his rookie year in 1987, catching seven passes for 116 yards and one touchdown. He appeared in all 16 games, starting five, during his second season in 1988, recording 22 receptions for 365 yards and one touchdown. Lockett was released by the Steelers on September 5, 1989.

Lockett signed with the Washington Redskins on March 7, 1990. On July 30, 1990, he was released by the Redskins after suffering an injury.

He played in eight games for the New York/New Jersey Knights of the World League of American Football (WLAF) during the 1991 WLAF season, catching nine passes for 97 yards and a touchdown.

== Personal life ==
Lockett appeared as a contestant on the 1980s game show Scrabble.
