= Rock Richmond =

American football player (born 1958)

No. 38
- Position: Defensive back

Personal information
- Born: January 7, 1958 (age 68); Miami, Florida, U.S.
- Listed height: 5 ft 10 in (1.78 m)
- Listed weight: 180 lb (82 kg)

Career information
- High school: Manual Arts
- College: Oregon
- NFL draft: 1980: undrafted

Career history
- San Diego Chargers (1980)*; San Antonio Gunslingers (1984–1985); Pittsburgh Gladiators (1987–1988); Pittsburgh Steelers (1987); Detroit Drive (1991)
- * Offseason or practice squad member only
- Stats at Pro Football Reference

Rodney Richmond (born January 7, 1958) is an American former professional football player who was a defensive back for the Pittsburgh Steelers of the National Football League (NFL). He played college football for the Oregon Ducks.
