= Jerry Quick =

American football player (born 1963)

No. 76
- Position: Offensive tackle

Personal information
- Born: December 30, 1963 (age 62); Anthony, Kansas, U.S.
- Listed height: 6 ft 5 in (1.96 m)
- Listed weight: 273 lb (124 kg)

Career information
- High school: Chaparral (Anthony)
- College: Kansas (1982); Butler CC (1982–1983); Des Moines Area CC (1984); Iowa State (1984); Wichita State (1984–1985)
- NFL draft: 1986: undrafted

Career history
- Pittsburgh Steelers (1986–1988)

Awards and highlights
- First-team All-MVC (1985); Second-team All-MVC (1984); Second-team All-KJCCC (1983)

Career NFL statistics
- Games played: 1
- Stats at Pro Football Reference

Jerry Dean Quick (born December 30, 1963) is an American former professional football player who was an offensive tackle for one game with the Pittsburgh Steelers of the National Football League (NFL). He attended college at Kansas, Butler CC, Des Moines Area CC, Iowa State, and Wichita State.

== Early life and education ==
Quick was born on December 30, 1963, in Anthony, Kansas. He attended Chaparral High School in Harper County, where he was a three-time all-state selection. After graduating from high school, Quick committed to the University of Kansas, but found the campus not to his liking and transferred to Butler Community College after one summer at Kansas. He played two seasons at Butler CC, and in the second was named All-Kansas Jayhawk Community College Conference (KJCCC). He was recruited to Kansas State, and was described as the "biggest of the K-State recruits."

Quick ended up transferring to Des Moines Area Community College in 1984, with the intention of attending Iowa State later in the year. Quick was listed as number two on the Iowa State depth chart, but decided he did not want to play for them as he and coach Jim Criner did not get along.

After learning former Butler CC teammate Rick Remsberg and coach Fayne Henson were at Wichita State, Quick became interested and transferred there. Despite having joined just three weeks before the start of the season, Quick learned the playbook and became Wichita State's top offensive tackle, starting in all 11 games. At the end of the year, he was named second-team all-conference.

After finishing his senior year in 1985, Quick was named first-team All-Missouri Valley Conference (MVC) by both Associated Press (AP) and United Press International (UPI).

== Professional career ==
After going unselected in the 1986 NFL draft, Quick was signed by the Pittsburgh Steelers as an undrafted free agent. He was placed on the season-ending injured reserve on August 20. In 1987, Quick appeared in one game, a week six win against the Indianapolis Colts. He was waived at the final roster cuts in 1988.
