= Cornell Gowdy =

American football player (born 1963)

No. 44, 29
- Position: Safety

Personal information
- Born: October 2, 1963 (age 63); Washington, D.C., U.S.
- Listed height: 6 ft 1 in (1.85 m)
- Listed weight: 196 lb (89 kg)

Career information
- High school: Central (Walker Mill, Maryland)
- College: Morgan State
- NFL draft: 1985: undrafted

Career history
- Pittsburgh Steelers (1985)*; Dallas Cowboys (1986); Pittsburgh Steelers (1987–1988)
- * Offseason or practice squad member only

Career NFL statistics
- Interceptions: 3
- Fumble recoveries: 2
- Touchdowns: 1
- Stats at Pro Football Reference

Cornell Anthony Gowdy (born October 2, 1963) is an American former professional football player who was a safety in the National Football League (NFL) for the Dallas Cowboys and Pittsburgh Steelers. He played college football for the Morgan State Bears.

== Early life ==
Gowdy attended Central High School. He accepted a football scholarship from Morgan State University. He played as a linebacker, safety and cornerback. As a junior, he led the team in tackles.

== Professional career ==
Gowdy was signed as an undrafted free agent by the Pittsburgh Steelers after the 1985 NFL draft on May 8. He was waived before the start of the season on July 30.

In 1986, he was signed as a free agent by the Dallas Cowboys. He appeared in 3 games and was released on September 23.

In 1987, he signed with the Pittsburgh Steelers as a free agent. He was released on August 31. After the NFLPA strike was declared on the third week of the season, those contests were canceled (reducing the 16 game season to 15) and the NFL decided that the games would be played with replacement players. In September, he was re-signed to be a part of the Steelers replacement team. He started 3 games and remained with the Steelers after the strike ended.

In 1988, he started 14 games, while taking over the strong safety position left by Donnie Shell. He was released on September 4, 1989.

== Personal life ==
Gowdy was a scout for the New Orleans Saints from 1997 to 2003. He later served as a scout for the Kansas City Chiefs from 2003 to 2009.
