= Alan Huff =

American football player (born 1963)

No. 64
- Position: Defensive tackle

Personal information
- Born: October 20, 1963 (age 63); East Liverpool, Ohio, U.S.
- Listed height: 6 ft 4 in (1.93 m)
- Listed weight: 265 lb (120 kg)

Career information
- High school: Oak Glen
- College: Marshall
- NFL draft: 1985: undrafted

Career history
- Pittsburgh Steelers (1985)*; Pittsburgh Steelers (1987)
- * Offseason or practice squad member only
- Stats at Pro Football Reference

Alan Edward Huff (born October 20, 1963) is an American former professional football defensive tackle who played for the Pittsburgh Steelers of the National Football League (NFL). He played college football at Marshall University.
