= Chuck Sanders =

American football player (born 1964)

No. 45
- Position: Running back

Personal information
- Born: April 24, 1964 (age 62); Pittsburgh, Pennsylvania, U.S.
- Listed height: 6 ft 1 in (1.85 m)
- Listed weight: 233 lb (106 kg)

Career information
- High school: Penn Hills (Penn Hills, Pennsylvania)
- College: Slippery Rock
- NFL draft: 1986: 11th round, 293rd overall pick

Career history
- San Diego Chargers (1986)*; Pittsburgh Steelers (1986–1987); New York Giants (1988)*; Los Angeles Rams (1990)*; Birmingham Fire (1991)*
- * Offseason or practice squad member only
- Stats at Pro Football Reference

Charles Samuel Sanders (born April 24, 1964) is an American former professional football running back who played for the Pittsburgh Steelers of the National Football League (NFL). He played college football at Slippery Rock and was selected by the San Diego Chargers in the 11th round of the 1986 NFL draft.

== Early life ==
Charles Samuel Sanders was born on April 24, 1964, in Pittsburgh, Pennsylvania. He attended Penn Hills High School in Penn Hills, Pennsylvania.

== College career ==
Sanders played college football at Slippery Rock. He was a four-year letterman from 1982 to 1985. He led NCAA Division II in rushing yards in 1984 with 1,315 yards. He totaled 658 carries, 2,706 rushing yards, 17 rushing touchdowns, 419 receiving yards, and one touchdown catch in his three years as a starter. Sanders was the first Slippery Rock player to play in the East–West Shrine Game. He was inducted into Slippery Rock's athletics hall of fame in 1997.

== Professional career ==
Sanders was selected by the San Diego Chargers in the 11th round, with the 293rd overall pick, of the 1986 NFL draft. He signed with the team on July 17 but was released on August 26, 1986.

Sanders signed with the Pittsburgh Steelers on September 9, 1986. He played in 14 games for the team during the 1986 season in a reserve role, totaling four rushing attempts for 12 yards, two receptions for 19 yards on four targets, and eight kick returns for 148 yards. He was listed as a running back/fullback in 1986. Sanders was released on August 31, 1987, after the third preseason game of the 1987 season. He signed with the Steelers again on September 24, 1987, during the 1987 NFL players strike. He remained with the team after the strike ended. Sanders played in five games overall during the 1987 regular season, rushing 11 times for 65 yards and one touchdown while also catching one pass for 11 yards on one target. He was released by the Steelers on November 3, 1987.

Sanders was signed by the New York Giants on February 29, 1988. He was released on August 16, 1988. By November 1989, Sanders weighed 262 pounds, later stating "I was a fat pig. I weighed 262. My girlfriend didn't even want to look at me." He cut down to 235 upon signing with the Los Angeles Rams on April 11, 1990. On July 27, 1990, it was reported that Sanders had been released.

On February 16, 1991, Sanders was selected by the Birmingham Fire in the fifth round, with the 49th overall pick, of the running backs portion of the 1991 WLAF draft. He was released before ever playing for the Fire.

== Personal life ==
Sanders later became the CEO of Urban Lending Solutions. He started a beverage line called Fever. He also opened a restaurant in Pittsburgh called the Savoy.
