= Dan Reeder =

American football player (born 1961)

No. 40
- Position: Running back

Personal information
- Born: March 18, 1961 (age 65); Shamokin, Pennsylvania, U.S.
- Listed height: 5 ft 11 in (1.80 m)
- Listed weight: 235 lb (107 kg)

Career information
- High school: Christiana (Newark, Delaware)
- College: Delaware
- NFL draft: 1985: 5th round, 135th overall pick

Career history
- Los Angeles Raiders (1985)*; Pittsburgh Steelers (1986–1987)
- * Offseason or practice squad member only

Career NFL statistics
- Rushing yards: 28
- Rushing average: 3.5
- Receptions: 2
- Receiving yards: 4
- Stats at Pro Football Reference

Daniel Robert Reeder (born March 18, 1961) is an American former professional football player who was a running back in the National Football League (NFL). "Delaware Dan" Reeder played college football for the Delaware Fightin' Blue Hens and was selected by the Los Angeles Raiders in the fifth round of the 1985 NFL draft. He was cut by the Raiders and signed with the Pittsburgh Steelers. He played parts of the 1986 and 1987 seasons with Pittsburgh, appearing in 13 games. He carried the ball eight times for 28 yards and caught two passes for four yards. He also returned four kickoffs for 52 yards.

Reeder now lives in Newark, Delaware, with his wife and two sons, Troy and Colby. He coaches Holy Angels football team. Reeder was the offensive coordinator for the Avon Grove High School Red Devils during their 2009 season, in which they won the Chest-Mont League and climbed to the third round of the state playoffs. After this season, Reeder left his position. The team has since gone on to have back-to-back losing seasons in his absence.
