= Theo Young =

American football player and scout (born 1965)

No. 80
- Position: Tight end

Personal information
- Born: April 25, 1965 (age 61); Newport, Arkansas, U.S.
- Listed height: 6 ft 2 in (1.88 m)
- Listed weight: 237 lb (108 kg)

Career information
- High school: Remmel Park (Newport)
- College: Arkansas
- NFL draft: 1987: 12th round, 317th overall pick

Career history

Playing
- Pittsburgh Steelers (1987–1988); Buffalo Bills (1989)*
- * Offseason or practice squad member only

Coaching
- University of Arkansas (1990–1991) Graduate assistant coach; University of Tennessee at Chattanooga (1992) Tight ends coach; Clemson University (1993) Wide receivers coach & tight ends coach; Rice University (1994–1996) Wide receivers coach; Rice University (1997–2005) Defensive line coach; Madison High School (2006–2007) Assistant coach; Baylor University (2008–2010) Defensive ends coach; Stephen F Austin High School (2018–present) Head coach & campus athletic coordinator

Operations
- Buffalo Bills (2011–?) Scout

Career NFL statistics
- Receptions: 2
- Receiving yards: 10
- Stats at Pro Football Reference

Theo Thomas Young (born April 25, 1965) is an American former professional football tight end and current head football coach in the Houston Independent School District.

== Playing career ==
Young played college football for the University of Arkansas Razorbacks, where he earned a degree in sociology, and was drafted by the Pittsburgh Steelers in the 12th round of the 1987 NFL draft with the 317th overall pick.

Young played one season in the National Football League for the Pittsburgh Steelers. He caught 2 passes for 10 yards in 12 games in 1987.

== Coaching career ==
Following his professional career, Young moved into the coaching ranks, serving as an assistant at the University of Tennessee at Chattanooga, and Clemson University, where he was hired by his former college coach, Ken Hatfield. He spent twelve years coaching for the Rice University Owls, remaining an assistant on Hatfield's staff. Young joined the staff of Baylor University as defensive ends coach in 2008. On January 12, 2011, Baylor announced that Young was among several coaches being let go under new defensive coordinator, Phil Bennett.

It was announced in June 2011, that Young joined the college scouting staff of the Buffalo Bills NFL team, where he participated in the NFL Minority Coaching Fellowship program in 1996. His primary scouting region included Kansas, Missouri, Iowa, Nebraska, Minnesota and the Dakotas.

Continuing to live in the Houston area, Theo Young is currently the Head Football Coach and Campus Athletic Coordinator for the Stephen F Austin Mustangs of the Houston Independent School District.
