= Lyneal Alston =

American football player (born 1964)

No. 81
- Position: Wide receiver

Personal information
- Born: July 23, 1964 (age 62); Mobile, Alabama, U.S.
- Listed height: 6 ft 1 in (1.85 m)
- Listed weight: 205 lb (93 kg)

Career information
- High school: Theodore (AL)
- College: Southern Miss
- NFL draft: 1987: undrafted

Career history
- Pittsburgh Steelers (1987)

Career NFL statistics
- Receptions: 3
- Receiving yards: 84
- Receiving touchdowns: 2
- Stats at Pro Football Reference

Lyneal Alston (born July 23, 1964) is an American former professional football player who was a wide receiver for the Pittsburgh Steelers of the National Football League (NFL). He played college football for the Southern Miss Golden Eagles from 1983 to 1986, with whom he had 64 receptions, 1,261 yards and 10 touchdowns during his career and appeared in the 1986 Senior Bowl. He later the NFL with Pittsburgh. He was cut by the Steelers in August 1988.

Pre-draft measurables
Height	Weight	Arm length	Hand span	40-yard dash	10-yard split	20-yard split	20-yard shuttle	Vertical jump	Broad jump	Bench press
6 ft 0 1/8 in (1.83 m)	202 lb (92 kg)	33 in (0.84 m)	10 in (0.25 m)	4.64 s	1.62 s	2.69 s	4.52 s	32.0 in (0.81 m)	9 ft 6 in (2.90 m)	7 reps
All values from NFL Combine
