= John Lott (American football, born 1964) =

American football player and coach (born 1964)

No. 51
- Position: Offensive tackle

Personal information
- Born: May 9, 1964 (age 62); Denton, Texas, U.S.

Career information
- College: North Texas

Career history

Playing
- Pittsburgh Steelers (1987); New York Jets (1988)

Coaching
- Houston (1991-1996) Strength and conditioning coach; New York Jets (1997–2004) Strength and conditioning coach; Cleveland Browns (2005–2006) Strength and conditioning coach; Arizona Cardinals (2007–2013) Strength and conditioning coach; Los Angeles Chargers (2017–2020) Strength and conditioning coach

Career statistics
- Game: 1
- Stats at Pro Football Reference

John Lott (born May 9, 1964, in Denton, Texas) is a former offensive tackle and American football coach for the Los Angeles Chargers who became known as a strength and conditioning coach for several National Football League teams. His "soundtrack" is popular and the NFL Network puts a microphone on him during every workout.

== Career ==
He started as an offensive lineman for the University of North Texas and was named All-Conference twice and All-American his senior year. Lott was a team captain and was even the strongest man in school history. He was a brother of Theta Chi. He played two seasons for the Pittsburgh Steelers and New York Jets before joining his alma mater at North Texas to oversee the eleven Varsity programs. In 1991, he was named strength and conditioning coach for the University of Houston where he stayed until 1996. A year later he was hired by the New York Jets where he was the strength and conditioning coach for eight seasons, from 1997 until 2004. He worked with Ken Whisenhunt on the Jets team in 2000. From 2005–2006 he was the strength and conditioning coach for the Cleveland Browns before being hired by the Cardinals in 2007. He was signed by the Los Angeles Chargers in 2017 as part of new coach Anthony Lynn's rebuilding of the team. Lott reunited with Ken Whisenhunt for the first time since working together with the Cardinals in 2013.
