= Larry Griffin (American football) =

American football player (born 1963)

No. 22
- Position: Defensive back

Personal information
- Born: January 11, 1963 (age 63); Chesapeake, Virginia, U.S.
- Listed height: 6 ft 0 in (1.83 m)
- Listed weight: 197 lb (89 kg)

Career information
- High school: Great Bridge (Chesapeake)
- College: North Carolina
- NFL draft: 1986: 8th round, 199th overall pick

Career history
- Houston Oilers (1986); Miami Dolphins (1987)*; Pittsburgh Steelers (1987–1993)
- * Offseason or practice squad member only

Career NFL statistics
- Interceptions: 13
- Fumble recoveries: 3
- Touchdowns: 1
- Stats at Pro Football Reference

Larry Anthony Griffin (born January 11, 1963) is an American former professional football player who was a defensive back for eight seasons in the National Football League (NFL). He was selected by the Houston Oilers in the eighth round of the 1986 NFL draft with the 199th overall pick. He played college football for the North Carolina Tar Heels.
