= Spark Clark =

American football player (born 1965)

No. 23
- Position: Running back

Personal information
- Born: May 22, 1965 (age 61); Jackson, Mississippi, U.S.
- Listed height: 5 ft 7 in (1.70 m)
- Listed weight: 182 lb (83 kg)

Career information
- High school: St. Joseph
- College: Akron
- NFL draft: 1987: undrafted

Career history
- Pittsburgh Steelers (1987)

Awards and highlights
- OVC Offensive Player of the Year (1986); 3× First-team All-OVC (1984–1986)

Career NFL statistics
- Return yards: 18
- Kick returns: 18
- Games played: 1
- Stats at Pro Football Reference

Michael Keith "Spark" Clark is an American former professional football player who was a running back for one season with the Pittsburgh Steelers of the National Football League (NFL). Clark played college football at Akron University for the Akron Zips.
