= Ken Woodard =

American football player (born 1960)

No. 52, 55, 59
- Position: Linebacker

Personal information
- Born: January 22, 1960 (age 66); Detroit, Michigan, U.S.
- Listed height: 6 ft 1 in (1.85 m)
- Listed weight: 218 lb (99 kg)

Career information
- High school: Martin Luther King Jr. (Detroit)
- College: Tuskegee
- NFL draft: 1982: 10th round, 274th overall pick

Career history
- Denver Broncos (1982–1986); Pittsburgh Steelers (1987); San Diego Chargers (1988–1990)

Career NFL statistics
- Sacks: 11
- Interceptions: 2
- Touchdowns: 2
- Stats at Pro Football Reference

Ken Woodard (born January 22, 1960) is an American former professional football player who was a linebacker in the National Football League (NFL). He played college football for the Tuskegee Golden Tigers and was selected 274th overall in the 10th round of the 1982 NFL draft. He played in the NFL for the Denver Broncos (1982–1986), Pittsburgh Steelers (1987), and San Diego Chargers (1988–1989).
