= Moses Ford =

American football player (born 1964)

No. 87
- Position: Wide receiver

Personal information
- Born: February 9, 1964 (age 62); Dillon, South Carolina, U.S.
- Listed height: 6 ft 2 in (1.88 m)
- Listed weight: 220 lb (100 kg)

Career information
- High school: Dillon
- College: Fayetteville State
- NFL draft: 1987: undrafted

Career history
- Pittsburgh Steelers (1987)
- Stats at Pro Football Reference

Moses Ford (born February 9, 1964) is an American former professional football player who was a wide receiver for the Pittsburgh Steelers of the National Football League (NFL). He played college football for the Fayetteville State Broncos before playing one game for the Steelers as a replacement player in 1987.
