= Paul Oswald =

American football player (born 1964)

No. 51, 67, 62
- Positions: Center, guard

Personal information
- Born: April 9, 1964 (age 62); Topeka, Kansas, U.S.
- Listed height: 6 ft 3 in (1.91 m)
- Listed weight: 273 lb (124 kg)

Career information
- High school: Hayden (Topeka)
- College: Kansas
- NFL draft: 1987: 11th round, 289th overall pick

Career history
- Pittsburgh Steelers (1987); Dallas Cowboys (1988); Atlanta Falcons (1988)

Career NFL statistics
- Games played: 6
- Games started: 1
- Stats at Pro Football Reference

Paul Eugene Oswald (born April 9, 1964) is an American former professional football player who was a center and guard in the National Football League (NFL). He played for the Pittsburgh Steelers in 1987 and for the Dallas Cowboys and Atlanta Falcons in 1988. He played college football for the Kansas Jayhawks football and was selected by the Steelers in the 11th round of the 1987 NFL draft with the 289th overall pick.

== Early life ==
He played high school football for Hayden High School in Topeka, Kansas. In 1982, he led his team as a standout middle linebacker and offensive guard. He also was an outstanding wrestler in the heavyweight division.
