= Bryan Hinkle =

American football player (born 1959)

No. 53
- Position: Linebacker

Personal information
- Born: June 4, 1959 (age 67); Long Beach, California, U.S.
- Listed height: 6 ft 1 in (1.85 m)
- Listed weight: 214 lb (97 kg)

Career information
- High school: Central Kitsap (Silverdale, Washington)
- College: Oregon
- NFL draft: 1981: 6th round, 156th overall pick

Career history
- Pittsburgh Steelers (1981–1993)

Awards and highlights
- Second-team All-Pac-10 (1980)

Career NFL statistics
- Tackles: 744
- Sacks: 22.5
- Interceptions: 15
- Fumble recoveries: 11
- Defensive touchdowns: 3
- Stats at Pro Football Reference

Bryan Eric Hinkle (born June 4, 1959) is an American former professional football player who played linebacker for twelve seasons for the Pittsburgh Steelers. He played college football for the University of Oregon. He currently resides in the South Hills section of Pittsburgh, Pennsylvania.
