= Delton Hall =

American football player (born 1965)

No. 35, 36
- Position: Cornerback

Personal information
- Born: January 16, 1965 (age 61); Greensboro, North Carolina, U.S.
- Listed height: 6 ft 1 in (1.85 m)
- Listed weight: 195 lb (88 kg)

Career information
- High school: Grimsley (NC)
- College: Clemson
- NFL draft: 1987: 2nd round, 38th overall pick

Career history
- Pittsburgh Steelers (1987–1991); San Diego Chargers (1992)

Awards and highlights
- PFWA All-Rookie Team (1987); Joe Greene Great Performance Award (1987); First-team All-ACC (1986)

Career NFL statistics
- Games played–started: 76–20
- Sacks: 1
- Interceptions: 5
- Stats at Pro Football Reference

Delton Dwayne Hall (born January 16, 1965) is an American former professional football player who was a cornerback in the National Football League (NFL). He played college football for the Clemson Tigers. He played in the NFL for the Pittsburgh Steelers (1987–1991) and the San Diego Chargers (1992)

Pre-draft measurables
Height	Weight	Arm length	Hand span	40-yard dash	10-yard split	20-yard split	20-yard shuttle	Vertical jump	Broad jump	Bench press
6 ft 0 in (1.83 m)	202 lb (92 kg)	30 in (0.76 m)	9 1/4 in (0.23 m)	4.48 s	1.59 s	2.62 s	4.61 s	30.5 in (0.77 m)	9 ft 4 in (2.84 m)	3 reps
All values from NFL Combine

Hall was selected by the Pittsburgh Steelers in the second round (38th overall) of the 1987 NFL draft—following the Steelers' pick of Rod Woodson (CB) in the first round. In his rookie year, he became an instant starter at cornerback, intercepting three passes on the way to earning Steelers' "Rookie of the Year" honors and the nickname "Beltin' Delton" from fans of the team.

Hall also was a standout in track and field, setting the North Carolina state 400 meters record at the NCHSAA Track Championships held at North Rowan High School in 1983.
