= Chronic traumatic encephalopathy in sports =

Chronic traumatic encephalopathy (CTE) is a progressive neurodegenerative disease characterized by the accumulation of hyperphosphorylated tau (p-tau) in the brain. Most documented cases have occurred in athletes with mild repetitive head impacts (RHI) over an extended period. Evidence indicates that repetitive concussive and subconcussive blows to the head cause CTE. In particular, it is associated with contact sports such as boxing, American football, Australian rules football, wrestling, mixed martial arts, ice hockey, rugby, skiing, snowboarding and association football. In association football, whether this is just associated with prolific headers or other injuries is unclear as of 2017.

== What is CTE? ==
CTE is described as p-tau accumulation in the superior frontal gyrus, entorhinal cortex, parahippocampal gyrus, insula, temporal pole, amygdala, and hippocampus of the brain, and more simply, a neurodegenerative disease linked to repeated trauma to the head. The factors thought to influence CTE development and progression are age at first Traumatic Brain Injury (TBI) exposure, duration between injuries, cognitive reserve, genetic predisposition, and chronic systemic inflammation, like obesity.

CTE is often associated with multiple neuropsychiatric signs and symptoms. Symptoms of CTE range from paranoia, depression, childish behavior, anxiety, memory loss, poor judgment, anger, irritability, apathy, confusion, and poor concentration. Neurobehavioral changes may occur at any time during the development of CTE. CTE patients can also exhibit behaviors like hyperorality and hypersexuality.

Athletes with CTE had more ventricular dilatation, cavum septi pellucidi, thalamic notching, and perivascular pigment-laden macrophages in the frontal white matter than those without CTE. Cognitive and neurobehavioral symptoms were frequent among the brains of the deceased athletes, with suicide being the most common cause of death, followed by unintentional overdose.

== CTE Cases ==
Most documented cases of chronic traumatic encephalopathy have occurred in many athletes involved in contact sports such as boxing, American football, professional wrestling, ice hockey, mixed martial arts, rugby, and soccer. Other risk factors include being in the military, prior domestic violence, and repeated banging of the head. The exact amount of trauma required for the condition to occur is unknown. Below is a list of notable cases of CTE in sports.

=== American football ===
The study of CTE's relationship with American football began in 2002. Since then, hundreds of players have been diagnosed posthumously with CTE, including a number of players who committed suicide. CTE has affected not only professional football players, but also athletes who played only in college or in high school.

In 2005, Bennet Omalu, a forensic pathologist and neuropathologist in Pittsburgh, Pennsylvania, found CTE in the brains of Mike Webster, Terry Long, Andre Waters, Justin Strzelczyk, and Tom McHale. Omalu, initially a medical examiner, then associate adjunct professor in California, was a co-founder of the Brain Injury Research Institute and reportedly in 2012 participated in the autopsy of Junior Seau. Omalu's participation was halted during the autopsy after Seau's son Tyler Seau, under pressure from the NFL, revoked previously provided oral permission. Tyler had received telephone calls from NFL management denouncing Omalu's professional ethics, qualifications, and motivation when the league asked him to revoke Dr. Omalu's research.

Research into football players with CTE has continued with neuropathologist Ann McKee of Boston University's CTE Center, who diagnosed the bodies of twelve former professional American football players with CTE postmortem between 2008 and 2010. An autopsy McKee conducted in 2010 on the brain of Owen Thomas, a 21-year-old junior lineman at the University of Pennsylvania who died of suicide, showed early stages of CTE, making him the second youngest person at the time to be diagnosed with the condition. Thomas was also the second amateur football player diagnosed with CTE. (Mike Borich, who died at 42, had been the first such player diagnosed with CTE, also by McKee.) The doctors who performed the autopsy indicated that they found no causal connection between Thomas's early-stage CTE and his suicide. There was no indication that Thomas missed playing time due to concussions; however, as a player who played hard and "loved to hit people," Thomas may have played through concussions and received thousands of subconcussive impacts on the brain.

On May 2, 2012, retired twelve-time Pro Bowler Junior Seau died of suicide from a gunshot wound to the chest. There was speculation that he had brain damage due to CTE. Seau's family donated his brain tissue to the National Institute of Neurological Disorders and Stroke. On January 10, 2013, the brain pathology report was released, and Seau's brain showed evidence of CTE. Seven months after Seau's death, on December 1, 2012, Kansas City Chiefs linebacker Jovan Belcher killed his girlfriend, then drove to Arrowhead Stadium and killed himself in front of then-GM Scott Pioli and then-head coach Romeo Crennel. A year later, on behalf of Belcher's minor daughter, a family lawyer filed a wrongful-death lawsuit against the Chiefs, alleging that the team deliberately ignored warning signs of CTE, possibly leading to Belcher's suicide. The lawyer also hired a medical examiner to examine Belcher's brain for signs of CTE. On September 29, 2014, it was confirmed that he had CTE. Coverage of Belcher's murder-suicide, combined with the suicide of Junior Seau, drew national attention to CTE and its effects on the brains of football players.

In September 2015, researchers with the United States Department of Veterans Affairs and Boston University announced that they had identified CTE in 96 percent of National Football League players that they had examined and in 79 percent of all football players. By November 2016, 90 of 94 former NFL players had been posthumously diagnosed with CTE by McKee. Professional players diagnosed included eight-time Pro Bowler Lou Creekmur, Cookie Gilchrist and Wally Hilgenberg.

In March 2016, former NFL running back Kevin Turner, who played for the New England Patriots and Philadelphia Eagles, died at age 46. Earlier, in 2010, he had been diagnosed with amyotrophic lateral sclerosis (ALS). But after his death, his brain was donated to Boston University Brain CTE Center, which diagnosed Turner with a severe case of CTE and stated that it was CTE, not ALS, that had killed him. However, there has been research into the connections of both CTE and ALS.

In April 2017, former New England Patriots tight end Aaron Hernandez died by suicide in prison at age 27. On September 21, 2017, an autopsy report from Boston University identified Stage 3 CTE in Hernandez's brain. Until Hernandez's autopsy, researchers had never seen Stage 3 CTE in a brain younger than 46 years old.

The Journal of the American Medical Association released an updated study in July 2017 reporting that out of 111 brains of deceased former NFL players studied, 110 (99%) had CTE. This also led to players retiring very early in their careers. As of December 2018, 87% of the 202 American football players' brains that have been donated to Boston University tested positive for CTE.

O. J. Simpson was suspected of having chronic traumatic encephalopathy before his death in 2024. After his death, Scientists had requested for Simpson's brain to be studied for signs of CTE, but the Simpson estate refused, who announced that his whole body will be cremated instead.

A recent 2024 study focusing on the quantitative characteristics of the brain in American Football players have identified structural brain differences in former American football players when compared to same-age men without a history of traumatic brain injury (TBI) or participation in sports. Former football players showed a minimization in the vivo cortical thickness and decreased cortical/subcortical volumes across brain regions.

The regions exhibiting reduced volume in former players included the superior frontal gyrus, entorhinal cortex, parahippocampal gyrus, insula, temporal pole, amygdala, and hippocampus. The study indicated that former professional players showed reduced volume in six regions: the entorhinal cortex, parahippocampal gyrus, insula, superior frontal gyrus, amygdala, and hippocampus. In contrast, unexposed former collegiate players showed reduced volume in only three regions: the superior frontal gyrus, amygdala, and hippocampus. These findings suggest that the intensity of exposure to football may be associated with alterations in brain structure.

==== League updates ====
In the early 20th century, a growing concern for the rising number of serious injuries and fatalities in football prompted calls for reform. In 1905, President Theodore Roosevelt held a meeting with representatives from Ivy League institutions to address the safety issues in college football. As a result, a series of rule changes were implemented to reduce dangerous collisions, legalize the forward pass, and grant officials greater authority to intervene in cases of injury. These safety reforms also led to the establishment of the Intercollegiate Athletic Association of the United States, which was later renamed the National Collegiate Athletic Association.

In 1939, the NCAA made it mandatory to wear helmets in college games. Before the instatement of this policy, it was optional to wear helmets, which usually meant the field was split half and half in terms of helmet or no helmet. This policy was instated due to concerns about safety and protection.

In 1964, the NCAA produced a policy that required football players to wear mouthguards during play. The mouthguard works to not only protect the teeth but also to prevent concussions by absorbing impact forces instead of letting force travel to the base of the skull and then consequently to the brain.

The NFL has taken measures to help prevent CTE. In December 2009, the NFL changed its rules for the assessment of concussions and return to play after a possible head injury. The number of full-contact practice sessions teams run has been reduced, based on the 2011 collective bargaining agreement.

In 2012, some four thousand former NFL players "joined civil lawsuits against the League, seeking damages over the League's failure to protect players from concussions, according to Judy Battista of the [New York] Times." In 2013 the NFL settled with a class-action lawsuit. The NFL supposedly hid the long-term effects of concussions. The NFL didn't admit to hiding anything, but they gave money to retired NFL football players who suffered from brain-related injuries from football. On August 30, 2013, the NFL reached a $765 million settlement with the former NFL players over the head injuries. The settlement created a $675 million compensation fund from which former NFL players can collect depending on the extent of their conditions. Severe conditions such as Lou Gehrig's disease and postmortem-diagnosed chronic traumatic encephalopathy may be entitled to payouts as high as $5 million. From the remainder of the settlement, $75 million will be used for medical exams, and $10 million will be used for research and education. However, in January, 2014, U.S. District Judge Anita B. Brody refused to accept the agreed settlement because "the money wouldn't adequately compensate the nearly 20,000 men not named in the suit." In the settlement Brody did accept, she argued that people "cannot be compensated for C.T.E. in life because no diagnostic or clinical profile of C.T.E. exists, and the symptoms of the disease, if any, are unknown." On April 22, 2015, a final settlement was reached between players and the NFL in the case adjudicated by Judge Brody. Terms include payments to be made by the NFL for $75 million for "baseline medical exams" for retired players, $10 million for research and education, as well an uncapped amount for retirees "who can demonstrate that they suffer from one of several brain conditions covered by the agreement," with total payments expected to exceed $1 billion over 65 years.

On March 14, 2016, NFL's senior vice president of health and safety, Jeff Miller, publicly admitted that there is a link between football and CTE at the roundtable discussion on concussions. In an attempt to lower the number of helmet-to-helmet hits, which often leads to concussions and increases likelihood of brain injuries, the NFL changed its rules for helmet-to-helmet hits in the offseason of 2018.

=== Boxing ===
The introduction of CTE and its relationship with Boxing began in 1928 when Dr. Harrison Stanford Martland discovered Punch Drunk Syndrome, the first label for Chronic Traumatic Encephalopathy, in boxers. Symptoms of CTE were often reported in boxers but unfortunately many boxers diagnosed with Punch Drunk Syndrome, Dementia Pugilistica, or CTE did not donate their brains for autopsy review. In 2005 approximately 77 years after its discovery there were fewer than 50 cases of brains with CTE found post mortem.

British physician A.H. Roberts performed one of the first clinical assessments of traumatic encephalopathy in athletes in 1969. Such an assessment focused on retired professional boxers in the United Kingdom. Roberts drew a sample of 250 retired boxers from a total pool of 16,781 registered with the British Boxing Board of Control between 1929 and 1955. Of the 250, 224 were successfully studied; 16 had died, 9 had emigrated, and 1 refused to participate.

Roberts found that 17% of the boxers showed signs of neurological damage consistent with traumatic encephalopathy. Of these, 11% were classified as having a mild form of the condition, while 6% were identified with a more severe presentation. Roberts also noted that the severity of symptoms correlated with the length of a boxer's career and the number of matches they had participated in. He also noted that a small subset of boxers experienced progression of Parkinsonian symptoms.

Notable cases of Dementia Pugilistica, Punch Drunk Syndrome, and Chronic Traumatic Encephalopathy in deceased boxers are Nathan Ehrlich, Adílson Rodrigues, Jack Doyle, Ad Wolgast, Joe Grim, Del Fontaine, Jimmy Ellis, Jerry Quarry, and Jimmy Young, Bobby Chacon, Mike Quarry, Emile Griffith, Willie Pep, and Billy Conn.

Other cases of Boxers who have been speculated to have experienced CTE but not ever diagnosed with the condition were: "Terrible" Terry McGovern, Battling Nelson "the Durable Dane", Muhammad Ali, Sugar Ray Robinson, Fritzie Zivic, Meldrick Taylor, and Rocky Graziano.

Boxers currently living with the symptoms of CTE as of 2021: "Irish" Micky Ward, Alan Blyweiss "The Rock", Wilfred Benitez, and Herol Graham.

=== BMX ===
In 2016, BMX biker and extreme sport icon Dave Mirra was diagnosed post-mortem with CTE. He died of suicide by gunshot on February 4, 2016, and his brain was examined by Lili-Naz Hazrati of the University of Toronto, who confirmed the diagnosis. In addition to the "countless" concussions he had during his career, starting very early into his youth career, his skull was fractured when he was hit by a car at 19 years old and he took up boxing after retirement. He became the first action sports star to be diagnosed with the neurodegenerative disease.

=== Ice hockey ===
Athletes from other sports have also been identified as having CTE, such as hockey player Bob Probert. Neuropathologists at Boston University diagnosed Reg Fleming as the first hockey player, defenseman who played fifteen years in the NHL, known to have the disease. This discovery was announced in December 2009, six months after Fleming's death.

Rick Martin, best known for being part of the Buffalo Sabres' French Connection, was diagnosed with CTE after his brain was posthumously analyzed. Martin was the first documented case of an ice hockey player not known as an enforcer to have developed CTE; Martin was believed to have developed the disease primarily as a result of a severe concussion he received in 1977 while not wearing a helmet. The disease was low-grade and asymptomatic in his case, not affecting his cognitive functions. He died of a heart attack in March 2011 at the age of 59.

Also within a few months in 2011, the deaths of three hockey "enforcers"—Derek Boogaard from a combination of too many painkillers and alcohol, Rick Rypien, an apparent suicide, and Wade Belak, who, like Rypien, was reportedly depressed; and all with a record of fighting, blows to the head and concussions—led to more concerns about CTE. Boogaard's brain was examined by BUSM, which in October 2011 determined the presence of CTE. One National Hockey League player known in part for leading "the thump parade", former Boston Bruin right winger Shawn Thornton mulled over the "tragic coincidence" of the three recent league deaths and agreed that their deaths were due to the same cause, yet still defended the role of fighting on the rink.

In 2016, Stephen Peat, then 36 years old and formerly an enforcer for the Washington Capitals during his professional career, was reported to be suffering severe symptoms of CTE. His father Walter was reported to worry that his son would join the "dead before turning 50 ... since 2010" list of enforcers including Boogaard, Rypien, Belak, Steve Montador.

In December 2017 Zarley Zalapski died, at the age of 49, after complications related to a viral infection. Following his death, his sister wanted to know if he had any brain issues and was confirmed to have CTE. In 1989, Merril Hoge was a Pittsburgh Steeler when Zalapski was a Pittsburgh Penguin. The two were part of a civic helmet-safety campaign and posed for photos. A few years before Zalapski's death, his sister Kyla had reached out to Hoge to assist her brother who was struggling with his health to transition into retirement.

In January 2018 former hockey player and captain for the Minnesota-Duluth Bulldogs Andrew Carroll, committed suicide, at the age of 32. He was only officially diagnosed with a few concussions. After looking at Andrew's lab results, researchers at Boston University estimated that number was closer to 20. A little over a year later Andrew Carroll was diagnosed with CTE.

In 2011, USA hockey, which controls the rules surrounding youth hockey in the United States banned body checking along with checking at the head or neck for kids who are ages 13–14 or younger. This is supposed to help prevent youth hockey players from getting concussions and other injuries in youth hockey.

In February 2015, Steve Montador died unexpectedly, and the subsequent examination of Montador's brain by doctors at Krembil Neuroscience Centre at Toronto Western Hospital found a "widespread presence" of CTE. Montador joins the growing list of former ice hockey players discovered to have CTE which includes Rick Martin, Derek Boogaard, and Reg Fleming.

Some researchers have argued that prospective longitudinal studies, following subjects over time, are needed to completely understand the causes and progression of CTE.

=== Professional wrestling ===
In 2007, neuropathologists from the Sports Legacy Institute (an organization co-founded by Christopher Nowinski, himself a former professional wrestler) examined the brain of Chris Benoit, a professional wrestler with WWE, who killed his wife Nancy and son Daniel before committing suicide. The suicide and double murder were originally attributed to anabolic steroid abuse, but a brain biopsy confirmed pathognomonic CTE tissue changes: large aggregations of tau protein as manifested by neurofibrillary tangles and neuropil threads, which cause neurodegeneration.

In 2009, Bennet Omalu discovered CTE in recently retired wrestler Andrew "Test" Martin, who died at age 33 from an accidental drug overdose.

On February 9, 2016, Daniel Bryan was forced to retire early due to signs of CTE and post-concussion seizures. He was medically cleared to wrestle again on March 20, 2018.

After their deaths in February and April 2016 respectively, former ECW wrestlers Axl Rotten and Balls Mahoney were found to have had CTE.

In July 2016, 53 professional wrestlers, represented by Konstantin Kyros, filed a lawsuit against WWE, looking to hold the organization accountable for their "long-term neurological injuries" due to multiple concussions and CTE. In November 2017, as part of filing an amended version of the lawsuit, Kelli Sloan and Shirley Fellows were added to the class-action documents, as they represented deceased wrestlers diagnosed with CTE, with Sloan representing her father Harry (Mr. Fuji) Fujiwara and Fellows her son Timothy Well. Carole Snuka, initially part of the first filing, also used the second filing to note her husband, whom she represented in the litigation, subsequently died and was also diagnosed with CTE. The lawsuit was dismissed on September 14, 2018, by US district judge Vanessa Lynne Bryant. An appeal was filed but the United States Court of Appeals for the Second Circuit dismissed it on September 9, 2020. According to a July 2019 appeal filed, six deceased wrestlers represented in the case were found to have CTE. Kyros noted Ashley Massaro, a seventh wrestler who has since died after she joined his class-action lawsuit, requested her brain be studied for CTE.

=== Mixed martial arts ===
Former mixed martial artists Gary Goodridge and James Leahy likely suffer from CTE as a result of repeated head trauma during their fighting careers. In keeping with other recorded instances of delayed onset, Leahy's symptoms developed years after his retirement from martial arts.

In October 2016, Bennet Omalu announced that CTE had been posthumously detected in the brain of MMA fighter Jordan Parsons.

In 2018, Wanderlei Silva admitted to experiencing symptoms consistent with CTE and expressed a wish to donate his brain for research.

=== Association football ===
In 2012, Patrick Grange, a semi-professional footballer, was diagnosed in an autopsy with Stage 2 CTE with motor neuron disease. "The fact that Patrick Grange was a prolific header is important", Christopher Nowinski, co-founder of the Sports Legacy Institute, said in an e-mail. "We need a larger discussion around at what age we introduce headers, and how we set limits to exposure once it is introduced." Grange played soccer in high school; college at Illinois-Chicago and New Mexico; in the Premier Development League; for Albuquerque Asylum; and for Chicago Fire Premier. He died of ALS at age 29 in 2012 with a posthumous diagnosis of CTE.

In 2014, Brazilian footballer Hilderaldo Bellini was posthumously diagnosed with CTE. Bellini helped lead Brazil to FIFA World Cup victories in 1958 and 1962, and he was the team's captain in the first one.

In 2017, a study identified CTE in four former association footballers known to be skilled headers.

English midfielder, Nobby Stiles, who died in October 2020, was diagnosed post-mortem as having chronic CTE caused by repeated blows to the head, and the disease was highly likely to have caused the dementia that he suffered in later life. During his career at Manchester United, Stiles headed a ball more than 70,000 times.

=== Rugby union ===
Researchers found Australian rugby union player Barry "Tizza" Taylor died in 2013 of complications of severe CTE with dementia at age 77. Taylor played for 19 years in amateur and senior leagues before becoming a coach.

In 2013, Willie Stewart, Consultant Neuropathologist at the Institute of Neurological Sciences at the Southern General Hospital in Glasgow, identified CTE in the brain of a former amateur rugby player in his 50s which is believed to be the first confirmed case of early onset dementia caused by CTE in a rugby player.

=== Rugby league ===
An Australian study of 25 retired NRL players showed they had impaired reaction times and concentration compared to the general population.

This included Kangaroos player Ian Roberts who had been knocked unconscious 14 times over his professional career.

In 2022, former player Paul Green died at the age of 49. A neuropathologist professor stated Green had one of the most severe cases of CTE they'd ever seen.

=== Australian football ===
Analysis of the late Australian rules football player Danny Frawley's brain revealed that he had stage two chronic traumatic encephalopathy (CTE) at the time of his death in 2019.

Australian rules football player Greg Williams is thought to have CTE as a result of concussions over a 250-game career.

In March 2016 Justin Clarke of the Australian Football League (AFL) team the Brisbane Lions was forced to retire at just 22 years of age due to a serious concussion sustained during off-season training two months earlier. He was the fifth AFL player in the previous ten months to retire with concussion related injuries, with Sam Blease (25 yo, Melbourne and Geelong), Jack Fitzpatrick (26 yo, Hawthorn and Melbourne Football Club), Leigh Adams (27 yo, North Melbourne), Matt Maguire (32 yo, Brisbane and St Kilda), and Brent Reilly (32 yo, Adelaide) all having retired since May 2015. All the retirements were linked to a crackdown on head injuries by the AFL and fears of CTE associated with local and international sportspeople, especially American footballers.

In 2021, an analysis of former Australian rules football player Shane Tuck revealed that he was suffering from stage three CTE, up to his suicide in 2020. This made him the third player to be diagnosed with CTE.

=== Baseball ===
In 2012, the brain tissue of Ryan Freel was tested after his death. It was found that he had Stage 2 CTE. Freel was the first Major League Baseball player to be diagnosed with chronic traumatic encephalopathy. After the 2012 season, the MLB instituted the Buster Posey rule. The rule is intended to reduce injuries, concussions in particular, caused by home-plate collisions between catchers and baserunners.

=== Canadian football ===
On January 10, 2011, former AFL and Canadian football player through the years of 1956 to 1967 Cookie Gilchrist died. Gilchrist was diagnosed with stage four CTE by Boston University.

=== Rodeo ===
In 2017, Ty Pozzobon, who at the age of 25 years also committed suicide, became the first professional bull rider diagnosed with the disease. Within ten years, he had received 15 head injuries and his first concussion at the age of 16.

== Young Adults ==
A study in 2023 that examined the occurrence of CTE in young athletes investigated the brains of 152 people who had played contact sports and died before the age of 30. 63 donors out of the 152 (over 40%) were diagnosed with CTE. Majority of the individuals diagnosed had participated in sports primarily at the high school or college level. So even at a lower level of the sport, many people can still develop CTE without having been professional athletes. In most cases of the donated brains, deaths were due to suicide or unintentional drug overdose. Cognitive and neurobehavioral symptoms were reported in brain donors regardless of whether CTE was present, indicating a bigger concern of mental health challenges among young athletes.

== Resistance ==
Resistance to implementing stricter policies for the prevention of CTE in contact sports has come from various organizations, governing bodies, and the media.

The Concussion in Sport Group (CISG), which is supported by FIFA, World Rugby, and the International Olympic Committee (IOC), has maintained a cautious stance regarding the connection between concussions and CTE. Recently, the CISG asserted that a cause-and-effect relationship between CTE and concussions or exposure to contact sports has not been established, in response to legal challenges and calls for reform, often as part of a broader defense strategy.

While some national sports organizations have faced direct accusations of suppressing unfavorable research findings, most notably the National Football League (NFL), others have been criticized for passive resistance. Soccer administrators have been accused of minimizing the issue and fostering what has been described as a silent scandal.

Critiques, particularly in the British press, were seen as influenced by developments and early exposés concerning the NFL's handling of concussion research. Resistance has also been rooted in concerns about the cultural integrity of sports. In both American football and soccer, ideas to modify gameplay for safety reasons, such as banning tackling or heading, have been met with significant pushback. This resistance is often engaged around preserving the character of the sport. As one NFL defender stated, “without helmets, it wouldn’t be football”.
