= Justin Strzelczyk =

American football player (1968–2004)

- Strzelczyk's 1998 Steelers profile photo

No. 73
- Position: Offensive tackle

Personal information
- Born: August 18, 1968; West Seneca, New York, U.S.
- Died: September 30, 2004 (aged 36); Herkimer, New York, U.S.
- Listed height: 6 ft 6 in (1.98 m)
- Listed weight: 305 lb (138 kg)

Career information
- High school: West Seneca West (NY)
- College: Maine
- NFL draft: 1990: 11th round, 293rd overall pick

Career history
- Pittsburgh Steelers (1990–1999)

Career NFL statistics
- Games played: 133
- Games started: 75
- Fumble recoveries: 1
- Stats at Pro Football Reference

Justin Conrad Strzelczyk (August 18, 1968 – September 30, 2004) was an American professional football offensive tackle who played nine full seasons in the National Football League (NFL) for the Pittsburgh Steelers from 1990 to 1998. His death, at age 36, helped spark a debate in the NFL about the link between playing football and chronic traumatic encephalopathy (CTE). He is one of at least 345 NFL players to be diagnosed after death with this disease, which is caused by repeated hits to the head.

== Early life ==
Strzelczyk was born and grew up in West Seneca, New York. His father Connie "Big Bird" Strzelczyk was a 6-foot-4 basketball standout player at Montana State University, from 1958 to 1960. He later returned to Buffalo where he became a school teacher and a painting contractor in the summer breaks. His father and mother, Mary Joyce, separated when Strzelczyk was 7. Mary Joyce later called Strzelczyk's father a "tremendous influence" in sports. Growing up Strzelczyk played hockey, football, and basketball. He also was a baseball pitcher until shoulder pain prevented him from throwing anymore.

He attended West Seneca West Senior High School and was a local basketball star. As a 6 ft 5 in (1.96 m) forward, Strzelczyk averaged 21 points a game as a junior and 22 as a senior, earning all-Western New York honors. Despite his love for football, Strzelczyk was set on playing basketball in college. However Strzelczyk's dad, who had played college basketball only to end up teaching, convinced him that he had a better future in football.

On October 16, 2009, West Seneca West High School retired Strzelczyk's football jersey #46. He was a member of the high school's graduating class of 1986.

== College career ==
Strzelczyk went on to play football at the University of Maine. The school won two Yankee Conference titles during Strzelczyk's time on the team. Teammates stated that he hated steroids and made his weight through eating and weight training. He was given the nickname "Jughead", after the Archie comics character. In January 1990, he played in the East-West Shrine Game held in California. There he impressed then-Steelers coach, Chuck Noll, who drafted Strzelczyk in the 11th round of the 1990 NFL draft.

== Professional career ==
Pre-draft measurables
Height	Weight	Arm length	Hand span	40-yard dash	10-yard split	20-yard split	20-yard shuttle	Vertical jump	Broad jump	Bench press
6 ft 5 1/8 in (1.96 m)	282 lb (128 kg)	32 1/2 in (0.83 m)	9 1/4 in (0.23 m)	5.04 s	1.78 s	2.91 s	4.49 s	29.0 in (0.74 m)	9 ft 0 in (2.74 m)	12 reps
All values from NFL Combine

Strzelczyk made the Pittsburgh Steelers' roster after the team's 1990 training camp and moved to Plum, and then Ross Township. Strzelczyk played on the Steelers special teams during his first two seasons. However, when right tackle Tunch Ilkin was injured and missed four games in 1992, Strzelczyk leaped into starting duty. He then started 75 of the 133 games he played and started at every line position, except center. During games, he would pick up the red phone on the Steelers' sideline and scream at the team's offensive coordinator, from Ron Erhardt to Chan Gailey to Ray Sherman: "Run the damn ball!" He played a key role in getting the Steelers to Super Bowl XXX.

In May 1998 Strzelczyk's father died after being paralyzed in a drunk-driving crash. Five months later, during a Monday Night Football game, against the Kansas City Chiefs, Strzelczyk had a quadriceps tear that required season-ending surgery two days later. He then injured his knee again in a bar fight in March 1999, which required further surgery, ending his next season as well. The Steelers placed him on injured reserve and paid him $187,000, a fraction of the $1.5 million he was scheduled to earn. Then, he tore his biceps on January 24, 2000, celebrating a hockey game. The string of injuries prompted the Steelers to waive Strzelczyk.

=== Music video ===
Strzelczyk appeared in the 1997 Adam Sandler music video, "The Lonesome Kicker". There, Strzelczyk plays himself as he steals the kicker's "snow shoe" and taunts him throughout the video along with fellow Steeler teammates Jerome Bettis, Greg Lloyd, and Kordell Stewart.

== Personal life ==
Strzelczyk took up riding Harley-Davidson motorcycles after signing with the Steelers. When he purchased his first bike at a bike-purchase celebration with teammates Ariel Solomon and Jerry Olsavsky in Oakland, Strzelczyk rammed into a couple of parked cars, denting only the fuel tank and his bike. He also took up the guitar and banjo, watching videos, reading books, cribbage and day trading as well. In early 1993, he married his wife Keana, and the couple had two children, before a divorce in 2001. Strzelczyk was known to be a heavy drinker, like his father Connie.

After being waived by the Steelers, Strzelczyk hunted for ways to fill the time. He began cooking chicken wings and barbecue sauces. He also rode his motorcycle to the motorcycle rally in Sturgis, South Dakota. He skied, played music, acted in two plays, and he wrote a book titled Balance, his theory about evening out life's enjoyments and stresses. He even once wrote a check for $17,000 to fund a daycare. He also invested in several businesses that failed, losing hundreds of thousands of dollars, although the monetary losses did not cripple his finances.

Strzelczyk had several issues with the police after his career ended. In November 2000, Strzelczyk was arrested and charged with carrying a firearm without a permit. The handgun belonged to a friend of his, with whom he had gotten into a discussion over gun control and briefly brandished the weapon. He was acquitted eight-and-a-half months later. In early 2003, he was cited for DUI and his driver's license was suspended for one year. The sentence was later reduced to two months. In late 2003, Strzelczyk suddenly swore off alcohol and all drugs, even prescription medication.

== Death ==
Strzelczyk was supposed to arrive in Orchard Park, New York, for a fundraiser that weekend. He packed only $2,600-plus in cash and some crucifixes. His cell phone was left at his home. He died in a car crash in Herkimer, New York, when he hit a tank truck driven by 60-year-old Harold Jackson (who was injured in the collision) while driving 90 miles per hour (140 km/h) against the flow of traffic to evade capture by the New York State Police after a 40-mile (64 km) chase along the New York State Thruway. He was 36 years old.

He was buried at the Saint Stanislaus Roman Catholic Cemetery in Cheektowaga, New York.

=== Chronic traumatic encephalopathy ===
It was initially thought that Strzelczyk was under the influence of alcohol or other drugs due to his irrational behavior, but that was disproved by toxicity tests. A postmortem autopsy revealed that he had brain damage due to his years of playing football. This incident sparked a debate about the seriousness of concussions at the National Football League Summit in June 2007 when neuropathologist Bennet Omalu linked the death of Strzelczyk to chronic traumatic encephalopathy like three other retired NFL players—Mike Webster, Andre Waters and Terry Long.

In 2007, Strzelczyk's mother, Mary Strzelczyk, granted Omalu permission to examine her son's brain. Strzelczyk was played by Matt Willig in the 2015 film Concussion. The film depicted the efforts of Omalu, who fought against the efforts by the NFL to suppress his research on the brain damage suffered by professional football players called chronic traumatic encephalopathy, a disease that football players get from taking constant hits to the head and causing damage to the brain.
