= NFL concussion committee =

Medical committee for the NFL

The National Football League concussion committee was an NFL head, neck and spine medical committee from 2007 to 2010. Statements from the former co-chair Dr. Ira Casson on concussion and injury have received national attention. It is best known for its denial, against medical proof, of the existence of chronic traumatic encephalopathy and its link to football.

== NFL research ==
In March 2007, Casson reported conclusions of research conducted by the NFL committee, denying that head injury is linked to long-term brain damage, depression, dementia, or any other serious brain disorder in NFL players. He told the New York Times that research reporting the contrary conclusion was "virtually worthless". He left the NFL in 2010 and has been called "Dr. No" as a result of his one-word answers in a critical interview on the subject of football head trauma. Casson's statements have been roundly criticized by other physician experts in brain damage.

== See also ==
- Concussions in American football
- National Football League controversies
- Concussion: A 2015 film about the concussion issue based on the exposé "Game Brain" by Jeanne Marie Laskas
