= Joseph Maroon =

American physician (born 1940)

Joseph Maroon MD, FACS
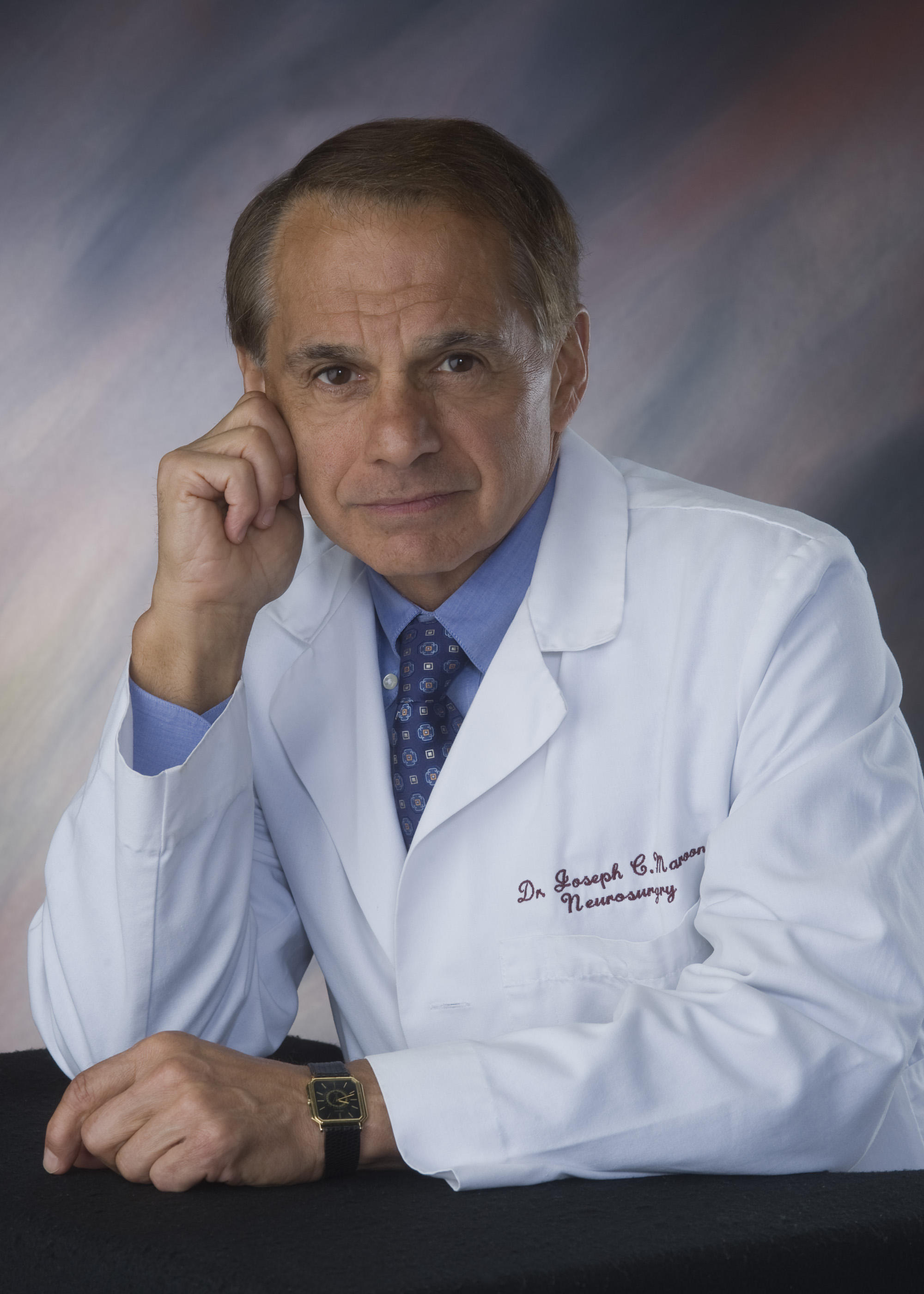
- Maroon in 2008
- Born: May 26, 1940 (age 86); Wheeling, West Virginia, U.S.
- Education: Indiana University Bloomington (BS); Indiana University School of Medicine (MD)
- Occupation: Neurosurgeon
- Known for: Former team neurosurgeon for the Pittsburgh Steelers; Former Medical Director of WWE; Medical Consultant for the Steelers
- Website: www.josephmaroon.com

Joseph Maroon (born May 26, 1940) is an American neurosurgeon, author, and triathlon athlete. He is a professor of and the vice chairman of the Department of Neurological Surgery at the University of Pittsburgh Medical Center. He is a former medical director of WWE, and currently acts as a medical consultant for the company. He is particularly known for his work studying concussions and concussion prevention as well as his hypothesis (after the discovery of the CTE by Dr. Bennet Omalu) on the development of chronic traumatic encephalopathy (CTE).

== Education ==
Maroon earned his B.S. degree in anatomy and physiology from Indiana University Bloomington in 1961 and his M.D. from the Indiana University School of Medicine (IUSM) in 1965. He received post-graduate education at IUSM (1966), Georgetown University Hospital (1967), John Radcliffe Hospital (1969), Oxford University, England, IUSM (1971), and the University of Vermont College of Medicine (1972).

== Career ==
=== Neurosurgical research and innovations ===
Maroon has conducted extensive research into neurotrauma, brain tumors, and diseases of the spine, which led to many innovative techniques for diagnosing and treating these disorders. Maroon was the first to publish on the use of ultrasound to detect venous air emboli (1968). Maroon et al. were the first to publish on the use of ultrasound to detect air in patients during neurosurgical procedures (1969) and to assess ophthalmic artery reversal of flow, indicating a thrombosis of the carotid artery (1969). Maroon et al. published the simplified instrumentation for performing microvascular surgery in 1973, and in 1975, they pioneered the microsurgical approach to intra-orbital tumors. In 1977, they pioneered the use of CT scanning as a guidance system for performing intracranial biopsy. In the same year, Maroon published the first paper on "burning hands" syndrome related to sports-related spinal cord injuries in JAMA.

In 1982, Maroon et al. pioneered the radical orbital decompression procedure for severe dysthyroid exophthalmos. In 1985, they were the first to compare microsurgical disc removal with chemonucleolysis and in 1986, they were the first to use a carbon dioxide laser in the management of lymphangiomas of the orbit. That year, Maroon et al. were among the first to describe their surgery outcomes with microlumbar discectomy. In 1987, Maroon and Onik introduced percutaneous automated discectomy as a new minimally invasive way to remove lumbar discs and subsequently published extensively on this technique. In 1990, Maroon et al. published the first microsurgical approach to far lateral disc herniations in the lumbar spine and in 2007, they published the case of Golfer's Stroke from Vertebral Artery Dissection.

Further groundbreaking publications include the use of fish oil as an anti-inflammatory and alternative to nonsteroidal drugs for discogenic pain (2006); a unifying, immunoexcitotoxicity hypothesis for chronic traumatic encephalopathy (2011); and the possible use of a restricted calorie ketogenic diet for the treatment of glioblastoma multiforme (2013).

In 2021, he began collaborating with Dr. Pravat Mandal on research utilizing magnetic resonance spectroscopy to assess glutathione deficiency—the brain's most abundant antioxidant—as a potential biomarker for the early diagnosis of Alzheimer's and Parkinson's diseases.

In 2023, he was appointed to the board of directors of Syncromune, a biotechnology company developing novel immunotherapies that integrate cryosurgery and checkpoint inhibitor drugs for the treatment of solid tumors.

In 2025, he and his colleagues received a research grant from the Chuck Noll Foundation to investigate glutathione deficiency in the brains of former National Football League (NFL) players and former Navy SEALs.

Dr. Maroon is also an advocate for the use of hyperbaric oxygen therapy in the treatment of post-concussion syndrome, post-traumatic stress disorder (PTSD), long COVID, stroke, and spinal cord injury. He has authored several publications on these topics.

=== Sports medicine, concussion, chronic traumatic encephalopathy (CTE), and hyperbaric oxygen therapy (HBO) ===
Maroon served as the team neurosurgeon for the Pittsburgh Steelers for 40 years, becoming one of the longest-tenured team neurosurgeons in the NFL. Although now retired from active surgical duties, he continues to serve as a medical consultant to the Steelers. He also served as medical director for WWE from 2009 to 2023 and remains a consultant to the organization. He is a past president of the Congress of Neurological Surgeons.

Together with neuropsychologist Mark Lovell, Maroon developed ImPACT (Immediate Post-Concussion Assessment and Cognitive Testing), a tool to assess the presence and severity of concussion symptoms. It has become the standard assessment for sports-related concussions, with over 25 million tests administered worldwide.

Maroon is interested in the prevention and treatment of concussions, specifically in football. In 2006, he joined the National Football League's Mild Traumatic Brain Injury Committee, which, in 2007, was renamed the Head, Neck, and Spine Committee. He has been consulted as an expert by American media on this subject.

Based on his research into the predictors and scope of chronic traumatic encephalopathy (CTE), he has suggested a more cautious approach to characterizing the condition as an epidemic. He claims there is reason to be skeptical of the reported widespread incidence of CTE. His position has mostly been met with negative comments across the media and sports press due to the NFL having as many as 4,500 former players reporting symptoms of CTE. More recently, he has been investigating the therapeutic effects of hyperbaric oxygen therapy (HBO) in various neurological conditions, including post-concussion syndrome, PTSD, traumatic brain injury, stroke, and spinal cord injury.

Maroon was asked to testify to the New York City Council on a proposed rule on sideline medical coverage for organized youth football in the city. Together with Russell Blaylock, he developed an inflammation hypothesis for the biochemical mechanisms involved in the development of CTE following head trauma. In the 2015 movie Concussion, which "examines how American football players suffer from major head injuries and life-long debilitating problems as a result of repeated concussions, and efforts by the National Football League to deny it," Maroon was played by actor Arliss Howard. In the movie, Maroon is portrayed as an NFL-biased doctor who tries to deny any relationship between football concussions and the brain pathology that Dr. Bennet Omalu found and attributed to CTE.

=== Burnout prevention and balancing life ===
After his personal experience with burnout at the peak of his medical career, Maroon developed a strong interest in burnout prevention and living a more balanced life. He conducted extensive research into burnout, burnout prevention, and what constitutes a healthy, balanced, and successful life outside of a professional career. Maroon has given keynote presentations on this subject matter at national and international conferences. In 2017, he published the book Square One: A Simple Guide to a Balanced Life. In 2025, he was the keynote speaker at Focus Forward 2025 for the state of West Virginia, where he spoke on the topic "How to Die Young as Late as Possible." He has also participated in numerous interviews and seminars promoting healthy living and longevity.

== Publications ==
Maroon has published over 340 peer-reviewed scientific articles, some of which may be found in the United States National Library of Medicine's publication database; his H-index, a measure of scientific research impact, is 74 (as of June 2025). As of early 2026, his work has garnered more than 27,300 total citations. Currently, Maroon is working with Dr. Pravat K. Mandal and has proposed oxidative stress as the underlying pathogenesis of Alzheimer's disease and Parkinson's disease.

=== Books ===
Square One: A Simple Guide to a Balanced Life Maroon J, Kennedy C. (2017) ISBN 978-0-9983509-0-5

The Longevity Factor: How Resveratrol and Red Wine Activate Genes for a longer and Healthier Life Maroon JC. (2008) ISBN 9781416565161 (made into a PBS Special)

Fish Oil: The Natural Anti-Inflammatory Maroon JC, Bost J. (2006) ISBN 9781591201823

Practice Diagnosis and Management of Orbital Disease Kennerdell JS, Cockerham KP, Maroon JC, Rothfus WE. (2001) ISBN 9780750672603

What You Can Do About Cancer. Maroon JC. (1969) Doubleday& Co., New York, 185 pp. (English, Italian, German and French translations).

== Athletic career ==
Maroon has competed in 8 Ironman Triathlons (Hawaii – 1993, 2003, 2008, 2010, 2013; Canada – 1995; New Zealand – 1997; Germany – 2000) and is to this day an active triathlon athlete. Dr. Maroon was inducted into the Lou Holtz Upper Ohio Valley Hall of Fame in 1999, the Western Chapter of the Pennsylvania Sports Hall of Fame in 2009 and in 2010 also to the National Fitness Hall of Fame in Chicago. For 2016, in the global ranking of Ironman athletes, Maroon ranks in 4th place in his age group. In 2022, Maroon placed second in the National Senior Games for his age group and placed first in the Chicago Triathlon for his age group.

== Honors and awards ==
Maroon received the Distinguished Alumni Service Award from Indiana University in Bloomington in 2011, recognizing his achievements as an undergraduate. In 2018, he was named Humanitarian of the Year by the Jerome Bettis Bus Stops Here Foundation for his contributions to health and wellness. In 2022, he received the Distinguished Alumni Award from the Indiana University School of Medicine. In 2025, he was awarded the Ellis Island Medal of Honor, which honors individuals who have made major contributions to American society while celebrating their cultural heritage.
