= CENC =

CENC may stand for:

- China Earthquake Networks Center
- Chronic Effects of Neurotrauma Consortium
- MPEG Common Encryption
