= Brain Injury Research Institute =

Center for the study of brain injuries

Coordinates: 40.52422°N 80.22701°W

The Brain Injury Research Institute (BIRI) is a center for the study of traumatic brain injuries and their prevention that was founded in 2002.

Its founding members include: Julian E. Bailes, M.D., Chairman of the Department of Neurosurgery at West Virginia University School of Medicine and former NFL and current NCAA team physician; Bennet Omalu, M.D., forensic neuropathologist, who is the Chief Medical Examiner for San Joaquin County, California, and Associate Adjunct Professor at the University of California, Davis; and Robert P. Fitzsimmons, Senior Partner at Fitzsimmons Law Offices, in Wheeling, West Virginia.

The Institute has established a brain and tissue bank. It now houses 20 brains for future research.

Bennet Omalu was the first to identify chronic brain damage as a factor in the deaths of some National Football League players. He discovered chronic traumatic encephalopathy (CTE) in the brain of Pro Football Hall of Fame player Mike Webster in 2002. Webster's son, Garrett Webster, is BIRI's administrator & player liaison. Omalu participated in former NFL player Junior Seau's autopsy after the latter's 2012 suicide.
