= Concussion (2015 film) =

2015 film by Peter Landesman

- Theatrical release poster
- Directed by: Peter Landesman
- Written by: Peter Landesman
- Based on: "Game Brain" by Jeanne Marie Laskas
- Produced by: Ridley Scott; Giannina Facio; David Wolthoff; Larry Shuman; Elizabeth Cantillon
- Starring: Will Smith; Alec Baldwin; Gugu Mbatha-Raw; Arliss Howard; Paul Reiser; Luke Wilson; Adewale Akinnuoye-Agbaje; David Morse; Albert Brooks
- Cinematography: Salvatore Totino
- Edited by: William Goldenberg
- Music by: James Newton Howard
- Production companies: Columbia Pictures; LStar Capital; Village Roadshow Pictures; Scott Free Productions
- Distributed by: Sony Pictures Releasing
- Release dates: November 10, 2015 (AFI Fest); December 25, 2015 (United States)
- Running time: 122 minutes
- Country: United States
- Language: English
- Budget: $35–57 million
- Box office: $50.4 million

Concussion is a 2015 American biographical sports drama film written and directed by Peter Landesman, based on the exposé "Game Brain" by Jeanne Marie Laskas, published in 2009 by GQ magazine. Set during the 2000s, the film stars Will Smith as Bennet Omalu, a forensic pathologist who fights against the National Football League trying to suppress his research on chronic traumatic encephalopathy (CTE), a degenerative brain disease suffered by professional football players.

The film premiered at AFI Fest on November 10, 2015, and was released by Columbia Pictures on December 25, 2015. The film grossed $50 million worldwide and received mixed reviews, although Smith earned a Golden Globe nomination.

== Plot ==
In 2002, retired Hall of Fame Pittsburgh Steelers center Mike Webster is found dead in his pickup truck, after years of self-mutilation and homelessness. Before his death, fellow former football player Justin Strzelczyk confides in Webster that he is suffering from memory loss, is saying odd things to his children, and nearly threw his wife against the wall. Webster deliriously responds by reciting from his Hall of Fame induction speech, that the most important thing "all we have to do, is finish the game".

Bennet Omalu, a forensic pathologist with the Allegheny County, Pennsylvania coroner's office, handles Webster's autopsy. Wondering how an otherwise healthy man could have degenerated so quickly, he closely examines microscope slides of Webster's brain, seeing evidence of severe neurotrauma. He concludes that Webster died as a result of the long-term effects of repeated blows to the head, a disorder he terms chronic traumatic encephalopathy (CTE).

With the help of former Steelers team doctor Julian Bailes, fellow neurologist Steven DeKosky and county coroner Cyril Wecht, Omalu publishes his findings in Neurosurgery, which are dismissed by the NFL. After Strzelczyk dies in a highway crash during a police chase following a psychotic episode, Omalu discovers that Strzelczyk and two other deceased NFL players, Terry Long and Andre Waters, exhibited symptoms very similar to Webster's.

Omalu persuades newly appointed NFL commissioner Roger Goodell to allow him to present his findings before a player safety committee, but he is barred from the committee meeting, forcing former NFL employee Bailes to do the presentation in his place. The NFL does not take the findings seriously and claim the players' head trauma is unrelated to football. Former NFL Players Association executive Dave Duerson angrily confronts Omalu and tells him to "go back to Africa."

Omalu is subjected to considerable pressure to back down from his efforts, as football is a widely beloved sport in Pittsburgh, providing jobs and college opportunities. Wecht is subject to a politically motivated prosecution on corruption charges, and Omalu is threatened with deportation and a prison sentence on petty charges as punishment for tarnishing the NFL's image. His wife, Prema, suffers a miscarriage after being followed in her car. The Omalus are forced to leave their dream home outside Pittsburgh, relocating to Lodi, California where he takes a job with the San Joaquin County coroner's office.

Three years later, Omalu is vindicated when Duerson commits suicide due to his inability to cope with worsening cognitive function. In his suicide note, he acknowledges Omalu was right, and offers his brain for future research. The doctor is invited to address an NFLPA conference on concussions and CTE. He says that he once wished he had never known Mike Webster, but by knowing him, he has the responsibility to inform NFL players of the true risks they take by playing. He says that he holds no resentment for the NFL and tells them to forgive themselves and be at peace.

Amid growing scrutiny from Congress, the NFL is forced to take the concussion issue more seriously, and in 2011, NFL players sue the league for not properly informing them of the risk of CTE. Dr. Omalu is offered the job of Chief Medical Examiner for the District of Columbia, but Omalu turned the offer down to remain with his family in Lodi, becoming naturalized as a U.S. citizen in February 2015. A final montage includes reports of Junior Seau's suicide in 2012 and subsequent lawsuits brought against the NFL by thousands of former players.

== Cast ==
- Will Smith as Bennet Omalu
- Alec Baldwin as Julian Bailes
- Albert Brooks as Cyril Wecht
- Gugu Mbatha-Raw as Prema Mutiso
- David Morse as Mike Webster
  - Ben McDonnell as Young Mike Webster
- Arliss Howard as Joseph Maroon
- Mike O'Malley as Daniel Sullivan
- Eddie Marsan as Steven T. DeKosky
- Hill Harper as Christopher Jones
- Adewale Akinnuoye-Agbaje as Dave Duerson
- Stephen Moyer as Ron Hamilton
- Richard T. Jones as Andre Waters
- Paul Reiser as Elliot Pellman
- Luke Wilson as Roger Goodell
- Dan Ziskie as Paul Tagliabue
- Sara Lindsey as Gracie
- Matthew Willig as Justin Strzelczyk
- Bitsie Tulloch as Keana Strzelczyk
- Eme Ikwuakor as Amobi Okoye (uncredited)
- Phillip Chorba as The Technician

== Production ==
=== Development ===
Ridley Scott's idea of an NFL concussion film was inspired by Dr. Bennett Omalu's study about former NFL stars Junior Seau and Dave Duerson, both of whom committed suicide after suffering from chronic traumatic encephalopathy (CTE). Scott was set to direct after his film Exodus: Gods and Kings, while he and Facio were looking for an A-list writer. In November and December 2013, two more NFL concussion films were in development, first Game Time Decision with writer/director and former NFL training camp attendee wide receiver Matthew A. Cherry and actor Isaiah Washington, and another film League of Denial with producers Walter Parkes and Laurie MacDonald. Landesman had based his script on the 2009 GQ article Game Brain by Jeanne Marie Laskas.

Will Smith entered negotiations to star in the film in June 2014. Smith was officially cast by the next month, when Alec Baldwin entered talks to join. In the months leading up to the start of production, Albert Brooks, Gugu Mbatha-Raw, Luke Wilson, Bitsie Tulloch and Adewale Akinnuoye-Agbaje would be announced as added to the cast. Smith met with Omalu, who was still the current chief medical examiner of San Joaquin County at the time.

It received $14.3 million in film tax credits from Pennsylvania.

=== Filming ===
Principal photography started on October 27, 2014, in Pittsburgh, Pennsylvania, and filmed there through mid-January. One of the film's key scenes was shot in Altius Restaurant in the Mt. Washington section of Pittsburgh. Other area scenes were shot at a church in Pittsburgh's Hill District, the Braddock Carnegie Library, and in downtown Pittsburgh.

=== Music ===
James Newton Howard composed the score for the film. Klayton (frontman of Celldweller) provided synth programming for the score. R&B singer Leon Bridges provided a new song, called "So Long".

== Release ==
The first trailer was released on YouTube on August 31, 2015, by Sony Pictures Entertainment. Sony released the film on December 25, 2015. Marketing included advertisements for the film airing during NFL games.

Concussion was released on Digital HD on March 15, 2016, before being released two weeks later on DVD, Blu-ray and 4K Ultra HD on March 29, 2016.

== Reception ==
=== Box office ===
Concussion grossed $34.5 million in North America and $15.8 million in other territories for a worldwide total of $50.4 million, against a budget of $35 million.

In the United States and Canada, the film opened on December 25, 2015, alongside Daddy's Home, Joy, Point Break and the nationwide expansion of The Big Short. In its opening weekend, the film was projected to gross $8–10 million from 2,841 theaters. It eventually grossed $10.5 million, finishing 7th at the box office. Due to Smith's star status and the $35 million production budget, the film was considered a box office disappointment.

=== Critical response ===
On Rotten Tomatoes, the film has an approval rating of 58% based on 207 reviews, with an average rating of 6.00/10. The website's critical consensus reads, "Concussion lands a solid, well-acted hit on its impressively timely subject matter, even if its traditional, sports drama structure is a little too safe to deserve a full-on dance in the end zone." On Metacritic, the film has a score of 55 out of 100, based on 39 critics, indicating "mixed or average" reviews. Audiences polled by CinemaScore gave the film an average grade of "A" on an A+ to F scale.

Will Smith's performance was praised for being "sensitive [and] understated" by the Associated Press. Alec Baldwin's performance was well-received, although his accent was criticized.

=== Accolades ===
Awards
Award	Category	Recipients	Result
African-American Film Critics Association	Best Actor	Will Smith	Won
Black Reel Awards	Outstanding Actor, Motion Picture	Will Smith	Nominated
Black Reel Awards	Outstanding Motion Picture	Concussion	Nominated
Black Reel Awards	Outstanding Supporting Actress, Motion Picture	Gugu Mbatha-Raw	Nominated
Black Reel Awards	Outstanding Ensembles		Nominated
Golden Globe Awards	Best Actor – Drama	Will Smith	Nominated
Golden Raspberry Awards	Razzie Redeemer Award	Will Smith	Nominated
Hollywood Film Awards	Actor of the Year	Will Smith	Won
MTV Movie Awards	Best Male Performance	Will Smith	Nominated
MTV Movie Awards	True Story		Nominated
NAACP Image Awards	Outstanding Motion Picture	Concussion	Nominated
NAACP Image Awards	Outstanding Actor in a Motion Picture	Will Smith	Nominated
NAACP Image Awards	Outstanding Supporting Actress in a Motion Picture	Gugu Mbatha-Raw	Nominated
Palm Springs International Film Festival	Creative Impact in Acting Award	Will Smith	Won
Palm Springs International Film Festival	Directors to Watch	Peter Landesman	Won
Satellite Awards	Best Actor	Will Smith	Nominated

== Controversies ==
Family members of Dave Duerson, a former NFL player who suffered from CTE (chronic traumatic encephalopathy) and committed suicide, claimed the film portrayed Duerson in a bad light. In one scene, Duerson's character called Omalu's character a "quack" in addition to telling him "to go back to Africa" and "get away from our game." In another scene, Duerson is shown mocking former NFL player Andre Waters when he filed an application for benefits in connection with head injuries he sustained while playing in the NFL. Duerson's family members called these scenes false. In response, Landesman, the film's director, stated that the film was "emotionally and spiritually accurate all the way through". When asked about the accuracy of the film, CTE researcher Steven DeKosky also noted that it took numerous liberties.

Slate science writer Daniel Engber, who has been skeptical of the link between CTE and the deaths of players found to have had it, called the film inaccurate in other ways, for example suggesting that Wecht's arrest on corruption charges was motivated by Omalu's paper, when in fact it was published three months afterwards. "[The film] feeds into a pervasive myth at the center of the national discussion over football and head injuries," he charges. In particular, he cites a 2012 National Institute for Occupational Safety and Health study indicating that football players, on average compared to the population as a whole, live longer and generally healthier lives, though the study also indicates, as Engber concedes, that former football players are also more likely to suffer, and die, from neurodegenerative disease.

More recent research and thinking also looks at the steady accumulation of subconcussive blows, in addition to symptomatic concussions, as a major contribution factor in the development of CTE. For example, a 2018 study found that each year an athlete played tackle football before age 12 predicted earlier onset of CTE symptoms by an average of two-and-a half-years, but not symptom severity. These CTE symptoms include cognitive, behavioral, and mood problems.

After comparing the script (from the Sony Pictures hack) with the released movie, Deadspin claimed the movie was edited to appease the NFL, including reducing prominence of Roger Goodell and Paul Tagliabue in the film, as well as changing or removing dialogue. The New York Times discovered emails directly referencing removing "unflattering moments for the NFL” and removing “most of the bite” out of the film “for legal reasons with the NFL". Landesman stated the changes were made "to portray the characters and story as accurately as possible to reduce the chance that the league could attack the filmmakers for taking too much creative license".

== See also ==
- League of Denial: The NFL's Concussion Crisis
- Head Games: The Global Concussion Crisis
- Concussions in American football
- List of American football films
- List of NFL players with chronic traumatic encephalopathy
