= Australian Sports Brain Bank =

Australian research laboratory

The Australian Sports Brain Bank is a medical research laboratory, a part of the neuropathology department of the Royal Prince Alfred Hospital (RPA) in Sydney. It is headed by neuropathologist Associate Professor Michael Buckland.

The bank was established in 2018 as a collaboration between RPA and Sydney University to study the relationship between concussion, head injury and chronic traumatic encephalopathy (CTE). It is a partner organisation of Concussion Legacy Foundation's (CLF) Global Brain Bank. In 2019, the bank opened a branch in Melbourne in conjunction with the Victorian Institute of Forensic Medicine.

In 2020, the bank identified CTE in the brain of Australian rules football hall of fame member Polly Farmer. Jacinda Barclay was the first contact sportswoman in Australia to donate her brain to the Australian Sports Brain Bank. Barclay was found dead at her Perth home on 12 October 2020. Her death was implied to have been a suicide. In 2021 researchers uncovered neurological degradation to her cerebral white matter, similar to that found in the brains of American footballers. Damage of this type is thought to be the result of repetitive head injury from contact sports and is linked to an increased risk of suicide. In 2023 researchers from the bank posthumously diagnosed Heather Anderson with CTE. She is the first female athlete diagnosed with this disease.

Other athletes who have pledged to donate their brain to the bank include boxer Jeff Fenech, National Football League player Colin Scotts, Australian Football League players Daniel Chick and Sam Blease and National Rugby League players Ian Roberts and Shaun Valentine.

== See also ==
- Boston University CTE Center and Brain Bank
- Concussions in sport
