= Jeanne Marie Laskas =

American writer and academic

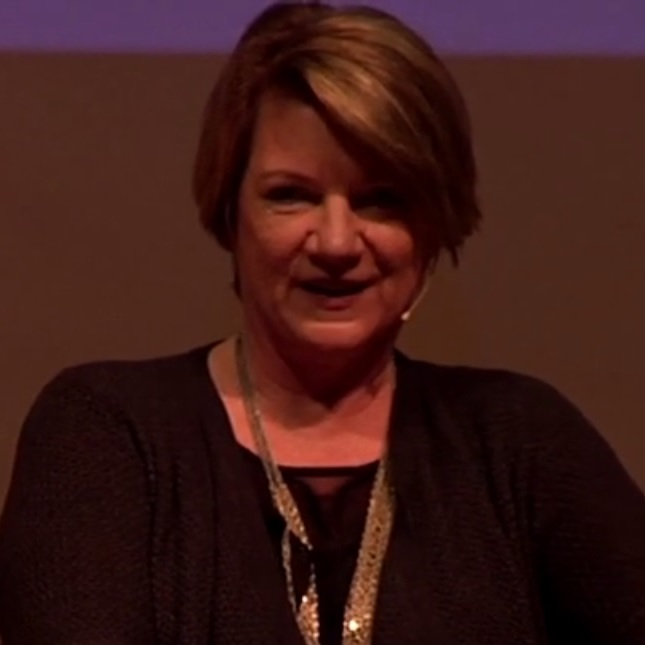
- Laskas in 2016
- Born: September 22, 1958 (age 67); Pittsburgh, Pennsylvania, U.S.
- Occupation: journalist
- Writing career
- Genre: non-fiction

Jeanne Marie Laskas (born September 22, 1958) is an American writer, journalist, and a Distinguished Professor of English at the University of Pittsburgh.

== Career ==
Laskas is the author of eight books, including To Obama: With Love, Joy, Anger, and Hope (2018), based on a New York Times Magazine article, and Concussion (2015). Similarly, Concussion is based on her 2009 GQ article "Game Brain" about forensic pathologist Bennet Omalu, who tried to publicize his findings of chronic traumatic encephalopathy (CTE) in American football players despite NFL opposition. The article was also adapted by Laskas and screenwriter Peter Landesman into a film of the same name, starring Will Smith as Omalu. Laskas is currently a GQ correspondent and contributes to the New York Times Magazine.

Laskas' other works include Hidden America (2012), Growing Girls (2006),The Exact Same Moon (2003), and Fifty Acres and Poodle (2000). Laskas' work has been widely anthologized, including in The Best American Magazine Writing 2008 ("Underworld") and The Best American Sportswriting 2000, 2002, 2008, 2010 ("Game Brain"), and 2012. Her New York Times Magazine article "The Mailroom" was a finalist in feature writing for the 2018 National Magazine Awards. Her GQ piece about coal miners, "Underworld," was also a finalist in feature writing in 2008. Her earliest essays and features are compiled in The Balloon Lady and Other People I Know (1996).

Laskas has been writing for national magazines for 20 years, with work appearing in The New York Times Magazine, Smithsonian Magazine, The Atlantic, and The Wall Street Journal. She was formerly a contributing editor at Esquire, and a weekly syndicated columnist ("Significant Others") at The Washington Post Magazine. She also wrote "Ask Laskas" in Reader's Digest and the "My Life as a Mom" column for Ladies' Home Journal.

Laskas and Erin Anderson, an audio producer and professor at the University of Pittsburgh, co-created Cement City, a ten-part narrative documentary podcast that was named one of The New York Times's Best Podcasts of 2024. Cement City received a Gold Tower in the Narrative/Documentary Podcast category at the 2025 New York Festivals Radio Awards.

Laskas is Founding Director of the Center for Creativity at University of Pittsburgh.

== Bibliography ==
=== Books ===
- Laskas, Jeanne Marie (1996). The Balloon Lady and other people I know. Pittsburgh: Duquesne University Press.
- We Remember: Women Born at the Turn of the Century Tell the Stories of Their Lives in Words and Pictures, (editor), with an introduction by Hillary Clinton, nonfiction (New York: Morrow, 1999). ISBN 0-688-15863-3
- Fifty Acres and a Poodle: A Story of Love, Livestock, and Finding Myself on a Farm, nonfiction (New York: Bantam Dell, 2000). ISBN 0-553-38015-X
- The Exact Same Moon: Fifty Acres and a Family, nonfiction (New York: Bantam Dell, 2003). ISBN 0-553-38149-0
- Growing Girls: The Mother of All Adventures, nonfiction (New York: Bantam Dell, 2006). ISBN 0-553-80264-X
- Hidden America: From Coal Miners to Cowboys, an Extraordinary Exploration of the Unseen People Who Make This Country Work, nonfiction (New York: Penguin, 2012). ISBN 978-0399159008
- Concussion, nonfiction (New York: Penguin Random House, 2015). ISBN 978-0812987577
- To Obama: With Love, Joy, Anger, and Hope (New York: Penguin Random House, 2018). ISBN 9780525509387

=== Essays and reporting ===
- Laskas, Jeanne Marie (January 17, 2018). "To Obama With Love, Hate, and Desperation." New York Times Magazine.
- Laskas, Jeanne Marie (February 29, 2016). "Helium dreams : a new generation of airships is born". Dept. of Aviation. The New Yorker. Vol. 92, no. 3. pp. 28–34.

=== Podcasts ===
https://www.cementcity.org/
