= Bennet Omalu =

Nigerian-American forensic pathologist and neuropathologist

Dr. Bennet Omalu
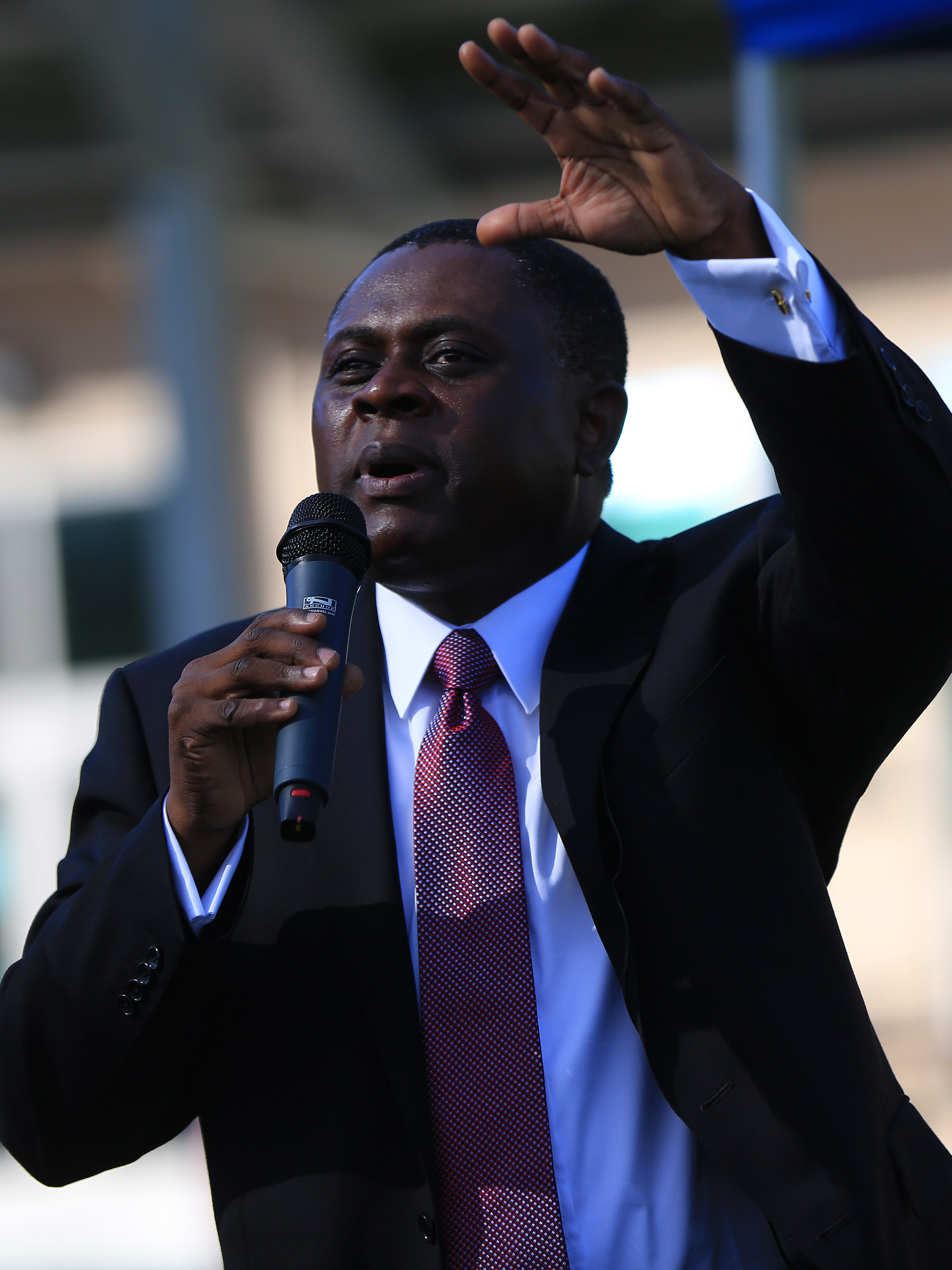
- Omalu in 2016
- Born: September 30, 1968 (age 58); Enugwu Ukwu, Nigeria
- Education: University of Nigeria, Nsukka (MBBS); University of Pittsburgh (MPH); Carnegie Mellon University (MBA)
- Notable work: Truth Doesn't Have a Side: My Alarming Discovery about the Danger of Contact Sports
- Spouse: Prema Mutiso
- Children: 2
- Website: Official website

Bennet Ifeakandu Omalu (born September 30, 1968) is a Nigerian and American physician, forensic pathologist, and neuropathologist who was the first to discover and publish findings on chronic traumatic encephalopathy (CTE) in American football players while working at the Allegheny County coroner's office in Pittsburgh. He later became the chief medical examiner for San Joaquin County, California, and is a professor at the University of California, Davis, department of medical pathology and laboratory medicine. He is currently the president and medical director of Bennet Omalu Pathology.

== Early life ==
Omalu is of Igbo ancestry, and was born in Enugwu Ukwu, Njikoka, Anambra, in southeastern Nigeria, on September 30, 1968, the sixth of seven siblings. He was born during the Nigerian Civil War, which caused his family to flee from their home in the predominant Igbo village of Enugwu-Ukwu in southeastern Nigeria. They returned two years after Omalu's birth. Omalu's mother was a seamstress and his father a civil mining engineer and community leader in Enugwu-Ukwu. The family name, Omalu, is a shortened form of the surname, Onyemalukwube, which translates to "one who knows should speak."

== Education and career ==
Omalu began primary school at age 6, and earned entrance into the Federal Government College Enugu for secondary school. He attended medical College and graduated at 21 from the University of Nigeria, Nsukka. After graduation with a Bachelor of Medicine and Surgery (MBBS) in June 1990, he completed a clinical internship, followed by three years of service work doctoring in the highland city of Jos. He became disillusioned with Nigeria after presidential candidate Moshood Abiola failed to win the Nigerian presidency during an inconclusive election in 1993 and began to search for scholarship opportunities in the United States. Omalu first arrived in Seattle, Washington in 1994 to complete an epidemiology fellowship at the University of Washington. In 1995, he left Seattle for New York City, where he joined Columbia University's Harlem Hospital Center for a residency training program in anatomic and clinical pathology.

Omalu received academic degrees in medicine and surgery from the University of Nigeria in 1990, an American medical license in 1998, and subsequent American board certifications in various areas of pathology and medical management. He held fellowships in forensic pathology and neuropathology from the University of Pittsburgh in 2000 and 2002 respectively. He received a master of public health (MPH) in epidemiology in 2004 from University of Pittsburgh Graduate School of Public Health, and a master of business administration (MBA) from Tepper School of Business at Carnegie Mellon University in 2008.

Omalu served as chief medical examiner of San Joaquin County, California from 2007 until he resigned in 2017 after accusing the county's sheriff Steve Moore, who doubles as coroner, of repeatedly interfering with death investigations to protect law enforcement officers who killed people. An assistant forensic pathologist who joined the office for the opportunity to work with Omalu resigned a few days earlier, citing similar allegations.

Omalu is a volunteer associate clinical professor at the University of California, Davis (UCD) Department of Pathology and Laboratory Medicine.

== Research ==
=== Chronic traumatic encephalopathy ===
Omalu's autopsy of former Hall of Fame Pittsburgh Steelers player Mike Webster in 2002 led to the re-emergence of awareness of a neurologic condition associated with chronic head trauma called chronic traumatic encephalopathy, or CTE, which had been previously described in boxers and other professional athletes. Webster had died suddenly and unexpectedly following years of struggling with cognitive and intellectual impairment, destitution, mood disorders, depression, drug abuse, and suicide attempts. Although Webster's brain looked normal at autopsy, Omalu conducted independent and self-financed tissue analyses. He suspected that Webster suffered from dementia pugilistica, a form of dementia induced by repeated blows to the head, a condition found previously in boxers. Using specialized staining, Omalu found large accumulations of tau protein in Webster's brain, which affect mood, emotions, and executive functions similar to the way that clumps of beta-amyloid protein contribute to Alzheimer's disease.

Together with colleagues in the department of pathology at the University of Pittsburgh, Omalu published his findings in the journal Neurosurgery in 2005 in a paper entitled, "Chronic Traumatic Encephalopathy in a National Football League Player." In it, Omalu called for further study of the disease: "We herein report the first documented case of long-term neurodegenerative changes in a retired professional NFL player consistent with chronic traumatic encephalopathy (CTE). This case draws attention to a disease that remains inadequately studied in the cohort of professional football players, with unknown true prevalence rates." Omalu believed the National Football League (NFL) doctors would be "pleased" to read it and that his research could be used to "fix the problem." The paper received little attention initially, but members of the NFL's mild traumatic brain injury (MTBI) committee later called for its retraction in May 2006. Their letter requesting the retraction characterized Omalu's description of CTE as "completely wrong" and called the paper "a failure."

Omalu later partnered with Julian Bailes, a neurosurgeon, concussion researcher, and then chairman of the department of neurosurgery at West Virginia University School of Medicine, and West Virginia attorney Robert P. Fitzsimmons to fund the Brain Injury Research Institute which established a brain and tissue bank.

In November 2006, Omalu published a second Neurosurgery paper based on his findings in the brain of former NFL player Terry Long, who suffered from depression, and died by suicide in 2005. Though Long died at 45, Omalu found tau protein concentrations more consistent with "a 90-year-old brain with advanced Alzheimer's." As with Mike Webster, Omalu asserted that Long's football career had caused later brain damage and depression. Omalu also found evidence of CTE in the brains of retired NFL players Justin Strzelczyk (d. 2004 at 36 years old), Andre Waters (d. 2006 at 44), and Tom McHale (d. 2008 at 45).

In summer 2007, Bailes presented his and Omalu's findings to NFL Commissioner Roger Goodell at a league-wide concussion summit. Bailes later said that the research was "dismissed". The NFL's MTBI committee chair, Ira Casson, told the press: "In my opinion, the only scientifically valid evidence of a chronic encephalopathy in athletes is in boxers and in some Steeplechase jockeys."

The NFL did not publicly acknowledge the link between concussions sustained in football and long-term neurological effects until December 2009, seven years after Omalu's discovery. However, as late as 2013, the annual meeting of the American Academy of Clinical Neuropsychology (AACN) included a debate between two sports concussion experts regarding the validity (or existence) of CTE. Finally, in March 2016, the NFL's senior vice president for health and safety policy, Jeff Miller, testified before Congress that the NFL now believed that there was a link between football and CTE. In 2016, the American Medical Association awarded Omalu with their highest honor, the Distinguished Service Award, for his work on CTE.

Omalu also discovered CTE in the brains of military veterans, publishing the first documented case in a November 2011 article. Omalu found evidence of CTE in a 27-year-old Iraq War veteran who suffered from post-traumatic stress disorder (PTSD) and later died by suicide. Omalu's paper links PTSD to the CTE spectrum of diseases and calls for further study.

Omalu was the lead author in a study published in November 2017 that for the first time confirmed CTE in a living person. A chemical tracer, FDDNP, binds to tau proteins, detectable by positron emission tomography, and associated with the distinctive topographical distributions characteristic of CTE. Tested on at least a dozen former NFL players, it was confirmed postmortem in former linebacker Fred McNeill.

Konstantine Kyros, an attorney who represented over 60 professional wrestlers in a class action lawsuit against WWE, claimed that Omalu posthumously diagnosed six wrestlers Kyros represented with CTE.

=== Other ===
In March 2018, Omalu conducted an independent autopsy of Stephon Clark, who had been shot by Sacramento Police officers. On March 30, he released his findings, stating that Clark had been shot eight times from the back or side, adding, "You could reasonably conclude that he received seven gunshot wounds from his back." The Sacramento County coroner published an autopsy that said Omalu's autopsy was "erroneous" and that a review does "not support the assertion that Clark was shot primarily from behind". According to the coroner, Clark was shot seven times. The examination was conducted by Keng-Chih Su, reviewed by three county pathologists, and independently reviewed by a Placer County forensic pathologist. Omalu said he was standing "firmly in defense" of his findings.

== In popular media ==
=== Concussion, book and film, and NFL controversy ===
Omalu's efforts to study and publicize CTE in the face of NFL opposition were reported in a GQ magazine article in 2009 by journalist Jeanne Marie Laskas. The article was later expanded by Laskas into a book, Concussion (Penguin Random House, 2015), and adapted into a drama film of the same name. In the film, Omalu, portrayed by Will Smith, is the central character. Although the film claims merely to be "based on real events", it has been criticized for inaccuracies. Nevertheless, the movie's production led to the creation of a foundation named after Omalu to advance CTE and concussion research.

A January 2020 article by Will Hobson, published in The Washington Post, contended that Omalu "routinely exaggerates his accomplishments and dramatically overstates the known risks of CTE and contact sports, fueling misconceptions about the disease, according to interviews with more than 50 experts in neurodegenerative disease and brain injuries, and a review of more than 100 papers from peer-reviewed medical journals." Further, "Omalu did not discover CTE, nor did he name the disease. The alarming statistics he recites about contact sports are distorted, according to the author of the studies that produced those figures. And while Omalu cultivates a reputation as the global authority on CTE, it's unclear whether he is diagnosing it correctly, according to several experts on the disease." On January 28, 2020 Omalu released a rebuttal titled "We are Becoming a Nation of Lies" to the Washington Post article. He also responded with a statement on his website.

Omalu's book, Truth Doesn't Have a Side: My Alarming Discovery about the Danger of Contact Sports, was published in August 2017 by HarperCollins. He previously wrote, Play Hard, Die Young: Football Dementia, Depression, and Death, published in 2008.

=== Other ===
In September 2016, Omalu attracted media attention when he suggested on Twitter that Hillary Clinton was possibly poisoned and advised members of her presidential campaign to "perform toxicologic analysis of Ms. Clinton's blood." He further tweeted, "I do not trust Mr. Putin and Mr. Trump. With those two, all things are possible."

== Personal life ==
Omalu is married to Prema Mutiso, originally from Kenya. They live in Elk Grove, California and have two children, Ashly and Mark. He is a practicing Catholic and became a naturalized U.S. citizen in February 2015.

== See also ==
- List of whistleblowers
