= Andre Waters =

American football player and coach (1962–2006)

- Waters with the Eagles in 1993

No. 20
- Position: Safety

Personal information
- Born: March 10, 1962; Belle Glade, Florida, U.S.
- Died: November 20, 2006 (aged 44); Tampa, Florida, U.S.
- Listed height: 5 ft 11 in (1.80 m)
- Listed weight: 200 lb (91 kg)

Career information
- High school: Pahokee (Pahokee, Florida)
- College: Cheyney
- NFL draft: 1984: undrafted

Career history

Playing
- Philadelphia Eagles (1984–1993); Arizona Cardinals (1994–1995)

Coaching
- Morgan State (1996) Defensive backs coach; South Florida (1997–1999) Defensive backs coach; Wharton HS (FL) (2000) Defensive coordinator; Alabama State (2001) Assistant coach; St. Augustine's (2002–2005) Defensive coordinator; Fort Valley State (2006) Defensive coordinator

Awards and highlights
- Philadelphia Eagles 75th Anniversary Team

Career NFL statistics
- Interceptions: 15
- INT yards: 164
- Sacks: 3.5
- Stats at Pro Football Reference

Andre Maurice Waters (March 10, 1962 – November 20, 2006) was an American professional football player who was a safety for the Philadelphia Eagles and Arizona Cardinals of the National Football League (NFL) from 1984 to 1995. Waters was regarded as one of the NFL's most aggressive players, serving as an integral part of one of the league's top defenses. On November 20, 2006, Waters died by suicide and was subsequently diagnosed with chronic traumatic encephalopathy (CTE). He is one of at least 345 NFL players to be diagnosed after death with CTE, which is caused by repeated hits to the head.

== Early life ==
Waters was born in Belle Glade, Florida and grew up in extreme poverty in rural Florida, and attended Pahokee High School. Waters received some attention in high school but ended up attending Cheyney University At Cheyney University of Pennsylvania Waters was recognized as All-PSAC three straight years.

== Professional career ==
In 1984, Waters was signed as an undrafted free agent by Philadelphia Eagles head coach Marion Campbell. He returned a kickoff for an 89-yard game-winning touchdown against the Washington Redskins as a rookie in 1984. When Buddy Ryan took over for Campbell in 1986, he welcomed Waters' aggressive style as a fierce tackler and ferocious hitter, earning Waters a position in the starting lineup for the next eight years. He blossomed under defensive coordinator Bud Carson. His tackle of Los Angeles Rams quarterback Jim Everett in 1988 led to a rule prohibiting defensive players from hitting quarterbacks below the waist while they are still in the pocket; for a while, it was unofficially termed the "Andre Waters Rule". NFL broadcaster Dan Dierdorf notoriously nicknamed the Eagles defender "Dirty Waters". He scored a touchdown in 1989 when he took a lateral from William Frizzell after Reggie White caused a fumble by New York Giants quarterback Phil Simms.

Waters served as part of the Eagles' defensive unit that was regarded as one of the league's all-time best, in 1991 ranking first statistically in both run and pass defense, as well as total defense. His hard-hitting style translated into leading the team in tackles for four seasons and endeared him with Philadelphia fans but often led to penalties and fines for some of his tackles. He led the Eagles in tackles in 1986, 1987, 1988 and 1991. He recorded 15 interceptions in 156 games. In 1994, he was replaced by Mike Zordich due to his contract ending. Waters finished his career playing for Ryan with the Arizona Cardinals for two seasons.

== Coaching career ==
After retiring as a player, Waters worked as a college football coach. In 1996, he joined the staff of Stump Mitchell at Morgan State as defensive backs coach. The following year under head coach Jim Leavitt, Waters took the same position on the upstart South Florida football program. He remained in that position until 1999. In 2000, Waters left South Florida to join the St. Louis Rams of the NFL as a coaching intern for training camp under Defensive Coordinator, Bud Carson. Leavitt made Waters choose between South Florida and the internship out of concern that Waters would miss too much preparation time with South Florida.

After his Rams internship, Waters returned to Tampa to be defensive coordinator at Paul R. Wharton High School in 2000. In 2001, Waters moved back to the college level as defensive backs coach at Alabama State. In 2002, Waters joined the Detroit Lions in his second stint as an NFL coaching intern. He later coached at St. Augustine's from 2002 to 2005 as defensive coordinator upon the football program's return from a 35-year hiatus. In 2006, Waters was defensive coordinator at Fort Valley State. Waters described his disappointment in not getting a full-time NFL coaching job to The Philadelphia Inquirer reporter Phil Sheridan. He remained very close to his former Eagles coach Buddy Ryan, whom Waters said he tried to emulate in his own coaching career.

== Death ==
Waters died by suicide shortly after 1 a.m. on November 20, 2006, according to the Hillsborough County Sheriff's Office, dying of a gunshot to the head. He was at his home in Tampa, Florida where he was discovered by his girlfriend. He was buried at Foreverglades Cemetery in Belle Glade, Florida.

Shortly after Waters' death, former Harvard defensive tackle and WWE wrestler Dr. Christopher Nowinski, whose wrestling career was ended by post-concussion syndrome and has since written a book about the dangers of concussions in contact sports, approached Waters' family and asked permission to have his brain tissue examined. After receiving permission, Nowinski had samples of Waters' brain tissue sent to neuropathologist Dr. Bennet Omalu at the University of Pittsburgh. Omalu believed, having examined the tissue, that Waters sustained brain damage from playing football: he went on to state that this led to Waters' depression. Omalu determined that Waters' brain tissue had developed chronic traumatic encephalopathy (CTE) and degenerated into that of an 80-year-old man with Alzheimer's disease, caused or hastened by the numerous concussions Waters sustained playing football.

Waters was portrayed by actor Richard T. Jones in the 2015 film Concussion.

== See also ==
- List of NFL players with chronic traumatic encephalopathy
