= Ramon Diaz-Arrastia =

American neurologist and clinical investigator

- Born: United States
- Occupations: Neurologist and clinical investigator

Academic background
- Education: BA in Biochemistry; PhD in Biochemistry; Doctor of Medicine
- Alma mater: Rice University; Baylor College of Medicine

Academic work
- Institutions: University of Pennsylvania Perelman School of Medicine, Philadelphia; Penn Presbyterian Medical Center; Hospital of the University of Pennsylvania

Ramon Diaz-Arrastia is an American neurologist and clinical investigator. He is the John McCrae Dickson, MD Presidential Professor of Neurology at the University of Pennsylvania Perelman School of Medicine in Philadelphia, and Attending Neurologist at the Hospital of the University of Pennsylvania and Penn Presbyterian Medical Center.

Diaz-Arrastia's research is focused on the molecular and cellular mechanisms involved in neuronal injury and neurodegeneration. He is a Zenith Fellow of the Alzheimer's Association.

== Education ==
In 1979, Diaz-Arrastia received a Bachelor of Arts degree in biochemistry from Rice University in Houston, Texas. He went on to earn a PhD in Biochemistry from the Baylor College of Medicine in 1986, followed by a Doctor of Medicine degree from the same institution in 1988.

== Career ==
Diaz-Arrastia began his academic career in 1993 by joining the University of Texas Southwestern Medical Center in Dallas, where he held various academic appointments, including assistant professor, associate professor, and professor in the Department of Neurology. He worked at UT Southwestern until 2011, when he joined Uniformed Services University of Health Sciences. In 2016, he left Uniformed Services University of Health Sciences to join University of Pennsylvania Perelman School of Medicine as Presidential Professor of Neurology.

As of July 2016, he has been holding concurrent appointments as an attending neurologist at the Hospital of the University of Pennsylvania and Penn Presbyterian Medical Center.

== Research ==
Diaz-Arrastia's early research work focuses on the role of traumatic cerebral vascular injury (TCVI) in the development of functional deficits and chronic disability following traumatic brain injury. His group showed that phosphodiesterase 5 (PDE5) inhibition reverses part of the deficit in cerebrovascular reactivity after TBI, and constitutes a promising therapy for traumatic cerebrovascular injury.

Diaz-Arrastia's research on post-traumatic epilepsy explored the prevalence, risk factors, clinical features, and management options of epilepsy that arise as a result of a traumatic brain injury. His research on surgical outcomes in Post-Traumatic Epilepsy revealed that surgery could be a viable option for reducing seizure frequency or severity, even in cases where other treatments have been unsuccessful.

In his exploration of new ways to diagnose mild traumatic brain injuries by testing for certain proteins in both the blood and small particles released by brain cells, also known as extracellular vesicles, his work revealed that these two sources of protein information i.e. (plasma and brain-derived extracellular vesicles) provide independent diagnostic information and when combined, accurately diagnose mild traumatic brain injuries.

== Awards and honors ==
- 2006 – Zenith Fellow, Alzheimer's Association
- 2008 – Distinguished Alumnus Award, Baylor College of Medicine

== Selected articles ==
- Levin, H. S.; Diaz-Arrastia, R. R. (2015). "Diagnosis, prognosis, and clinical management of mild traumatic brain injury". The Lancet Neurology. 14 (5): 506–517. doi:10.1016/S1474-4422(15)00002-2. PMID 25801547.
- Iturria-Medina, Y.; Sotero, R. C.; Toussaint, P. J.; Mateos-Pérez, J. M.; Evans, A. C. (2016). "Early role of vascular dysregulation on late-onset Alzheimer's disease based on multifactorial data-driven analysis". Nature Communications. 7 (1) 11934. Bibcode:2016NatCo...711934I. doi:10.1038/ncomms11934. PMC 4919512. PMID 27327500.
- Sandsmark, D. K.; Bashir, A.; Wellington, C. L.; Diaz-Arrastia, R. (2019). "Cerebral Microvascular Injury: A Potentially Treatable Endophenotype of Traumatic Brain Injury-Induced Neurodegeneration". Neuron (Review). 103 (3): 367–379. doi:10.1016/j.neuron.2019.05.025. PMC 6688649. PMID 31394062.
- Maas, A. I. R.; Menon, D. K.; Diaz-Arrastia, R.; et al. (2022). "Traumatic brain injury: Progress and challenges in prevention, clinical care, and research". Lancet Neurology. 21 (11): 953–954. doi:10.1016/S1474-4422(22)00337-4. PMID 36183710.
