= Chronic Effects of Neurotrauma Consortium =

US federally funded research project

Chronic Effects of Neurotrauma Consortium (CENC)
- Founded: 2013
- Type: Research Consortium
- Location: Richmond, Virginia, United States
- Coordinates: 37.546615°N 77.453255°W
- Region served: United States
- Website: cenc.rti.org

The Chronic Effects of Neurotrauma Consortium (CENC) is a federally funded research project devised to address the long-term effects of mild traumatic brain injury in military service personnel (SMs) and Veterans. Announced by President Barack Obama on August 20, 2013, the CENC was one of two major initiatives developed in response to the injuries incurred by U.S. service personnel during Operation Enduring Freedom and Operation Iraqi Freedom. The project is jointly funded in the amount of $62.175 million by the Department of Defense (DoD) and the Department of Veterans Affairs (VA). The CENC is led by Dr. David X. Cifu of the Virginia Commonwealth University.

== Background ==
In short, critical gaps exist in the literature, with a paucity of prospective, controlled studies on late-life outcomes and neurodegeneration after mTBI and related basic science research. These research gaps are particularly prominent in the injuries and difficulties seen in combat-exposed populations. The existing research, although suggestive, is not rigorous or robust enough to allow for a clear understanding of the relationships, risks, and potential effective interventions for mTBI, chronic symptoms, and neurodegeneration. To date, no controlled prospective longitudinal study has examined the late-life cognitive, behavioral, systemic, and functional effects of TBI of any severity. Given the absence of prospective studies, the association between TBI and early neurodegeneration is merely theoretical, and the actual risk factors and rate/extent of physiologic and clinical decline over time are unknown. It is also unclear whether a single TBI may be enough to begin a degenerative cascade in select individuals or whether a critical number (dose threshold) of TBIs is needed to “prime” the central nervous system for degeneration. As the majority of TBIs in the military are mild, prospective studies of cognitive outcomes from mild injury are necessary to determine the long-term risks posed to SMs and Veterans. The potential link between mTBI and the development of early dementia is a significant concern for not only at-risk SMs, Veterans, and their families, but also for DoD and VA resource planning, given the high service utilization in the DoD and VA health systems associated with dementia.

Given these gaps in scientific research and knowledge, the military- and Veteran-specific issues involved, and the importance of a uniform approach to this critical set of problems, the Department of Defense and the Department of Veterans Affairs jointly issued a request for proposals to fund a 5-year, $62.175 million project to address these concerns. After a competitive application process, a consortium led by Virginia Commonwealth University prevailed and was announced as the recipient of the award by President Obama on August 20, 2013. At the time of the award, this was the single largest grant ever awarded to Virginia Commonwealth University.

== The Consortium ==
The mission of the CENC is to fill the gaps in knowledge about the basic science of mild TBI (also termed concussion), to determine its effects on late-life outcomes and neurodegeneration, to identify service members most susceptible to these effects, and to identify the most effective treatment strategies. The CENC is a multi-center collaboration linking premiere basic science, translational, and clinical neuroscience researchers from the DoD, VA, academic universities, and private research institutes to effectively address the scientific, diagnostic, and therapeutic ramifications of mild TBI and its long-term effects.

=== Oversight ===
The CENC has oversight from a Government Steering Committee (GSC). Members of the GSC are DoD/VA appointed and is composed of both government representatives and non-government subject matter experts. The GSC approves all studies to be conducted, recommends new studies, and identifies existing and new requirements as they arise. The GSC is the overall main governing and management committee for the project and the committee through which the DoD and VA interact and collaborate with the CENC. The GSC determines all major scientific decisions, and clinical studies proposed by the Consortium Committee proceed into the implementation stage only with the approval of the GSC.
