= Mike Webster =

American football player (1952–2002)

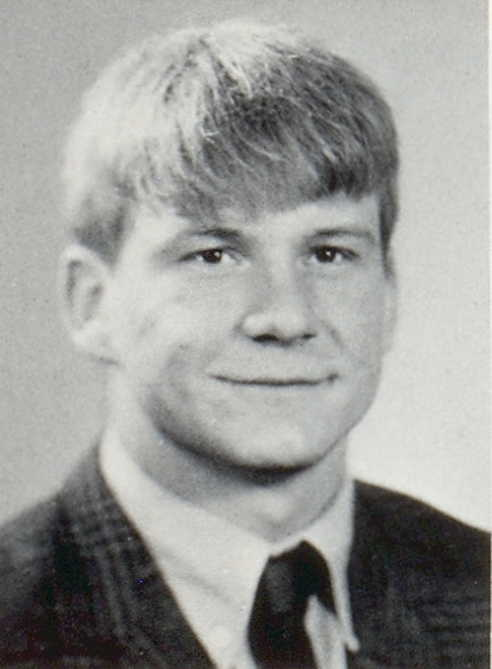
- Webster at 18, 1970

No. 52, 53
- Position: Center

Personal information
- Born: March 18, 1952; Tomahawk, Wisconsin, U.S.
- Died: September 24, 2002 (aged 50); Pittsburgh, Pennsylvania, U.S.
- Listed height: 6 ft 1 in (1.85 m)
- Listed weight: 255 lb (116 kg)

Career information
- High school: Rhinelander (Rhinelander, Wisconsin)
- College: Wisconsin
- NFL draft: 1974: 5th round, 125th overall pick

Career history

Playing
- Pittsburgh Steelers (1974–1988); Kansas City Chiefs (1989–1990)

Coaching
- Kansas City Chiefs (1989) Assistant offensive line coach

Awards and highlights
- 4× Super Bowl champion (IX, X, XIII, XIV); 6× First-team All-Pro (1978–1983); 2× Second-team All-Pro (1982, 1984); 9× Pro Bowl (1978–1985, 1987); NFL 1970s All-Decade Team; NFL 1980s All-Decade Team; NFL 75th Anniversary All-Time Team; NFL 100th Anniversary All-Time Team; PFWA NFL All-Rookie Team (1974); Pittsburgh Steelers All-Time Team; Pittsburgh Steelers Hall of Honor; First-team All-Big Ten (1973); Second-team All-Big Ten (1972)

Career NFL statistics
- Games played: 245
- Games started: 217
- Fumble recoveries: 6
- Stats at Pro Football Reference
- Pro Football Hall of Fame

Michael Lewis Webster (March 18, 1952 – September 24, 2002) was an American professional football center in the National Football League (NFL) from 1974 to 1990 with the Pittsburgh Steelers and Kansas City Chiefs. He is a member of the Pro Football Hall of Fame, class of 1997. Nicknamed "Iron Mike", due to his durability and longevity, Webster anchored the Steelers' offensive line during much of their run of four Super Bowl victories from 1974 to 1979, and is considered by many the greatest center in NFL history.

Webster died in 2002 at the age of 50 of a heart attack. The brain disease chronic traumatic encephalopathy (CTE) was initially discovered in his brain during his autopsy, and brought attention to the disease.

== Early life ==
Webster was born in Tomahawk, Wisconsin, north of Wausau, on March 18, 1952, the second of six children. He grew up on a 640-acre potato farm near Harshaw, Wisconsin, southeast of Park Falls. As a child, Webster was a devoted Green Bay Packers fan and admired fullback Jim Taylor. When Webster was 10 years old, his parents who were both alcoholics divorced and a year later the family home burned down leaving his family temporarily homeless. To cope with his dysfunctional upbringing, Webster found refuge in sports which gave him a sense of family he never had at home. Webster attended Rhinelander High School in Rhinelander, Wisconsin, and was a star athlete that earned several awards in wrestling and track and field although one of his ears suffered permanent damage due to being slammed on the wrestling mat many times. Due to Webster's responsibilities on his family's farm, he did not start playing football until his junior year. His head coach Dave Lechnir had to drive Webster home after practice so the latter could get home in time to do his chores. Despite Webster's late introduction to the game, he quickly learned how to command the offensive line and earned a football scholarship.

== College career ==
After graduating from high school in 1970, Webster committed to the University of Wisconsin–Madison. He was 6'1" and around 230 pounds when he began his college career, he later bulked up to 255 pounds while he played for the Badgers. He was regarded as being the best center in the Big Ten during most of his career with the Badgers. While at the University of Wisconsin, Webster started at center for three seasons and was promoted to team captain during his senior year. He earned recognition as the team's Most Valuable Player and received All-Big Ten honors. Webster also showcased his skills in many postseason games including the College All-Star Game, East-West Shrine Bowl, Hula Bowl, Senior Bowl, and the Coaches All-America Game.

== Professional career ==
=== Pittsburgh Steelers ===
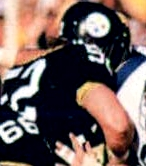
Webster during Super Bowl XIV

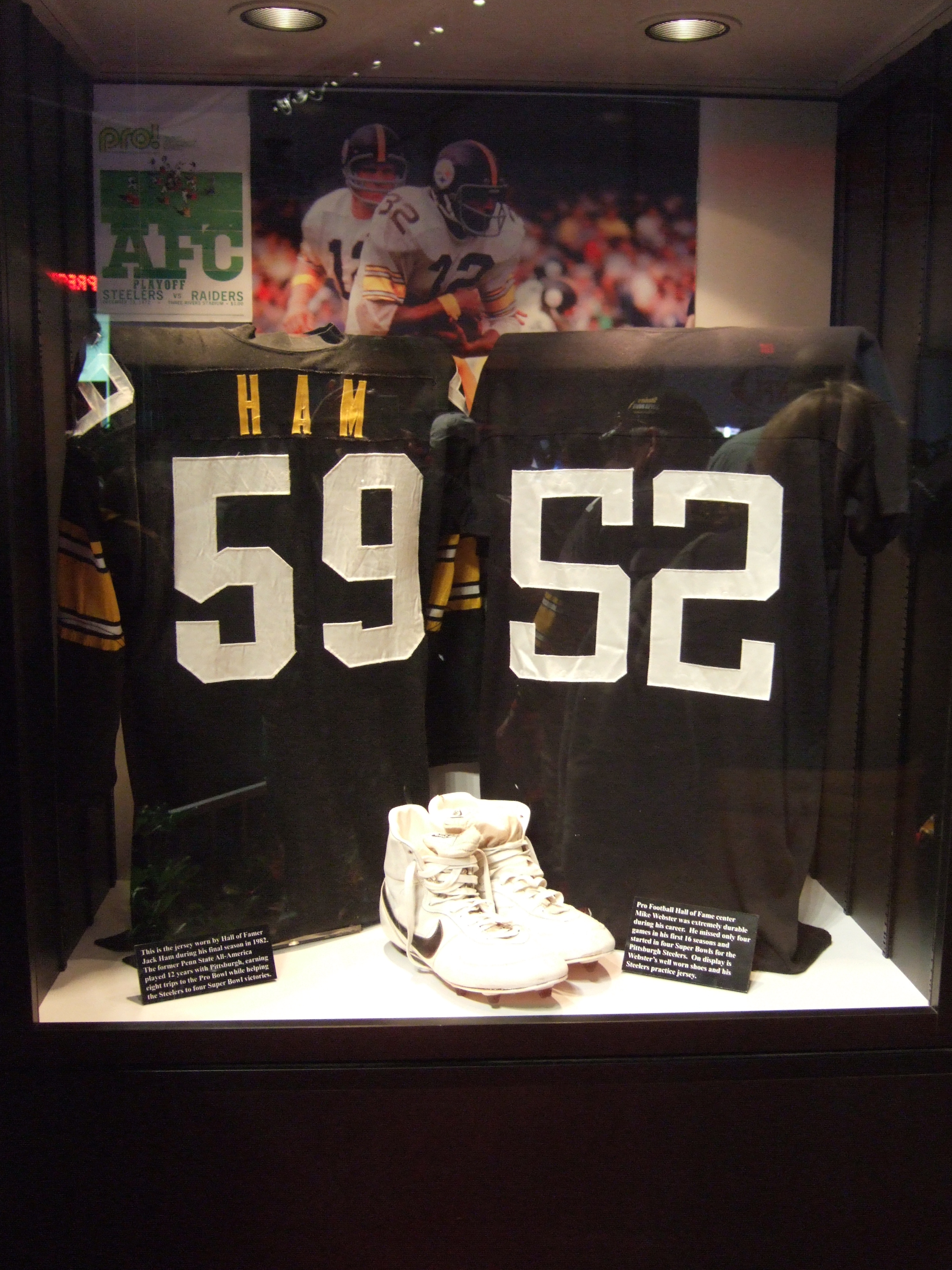
Steelers uniforms worn by Jack Ham (59) and Webster (52)

At 6 feet 1 inch (1.85 m) and 255 pounds (116 kg), Webster was selected in the fifth round of the 1974 NFL draft by the Pittsburgh Steelers. He served as a backup at center and guard for two years while being mentored by veteran center Ray Mansfield. Webster became the team's starting center in 1976, where he remained for 150 consecutive games. He was the Steelers' offensive captain for nine years. That ended in 1986 when Webster dislocated his elbow, causing him to sit out for four games. The Steelers won Super Bowls IX, X, XIII, and XIV and holds the record for most Super Bowl championships by a center. Webster was honored as an All-Pro seven times and played in the Pro Bowl nine times.

An avid weightlifter, Webster was known for playing with bare arms regardless of the weather to keep opponents from grabbing his sleeves; as his techniques were primarily done to reduce holding calls, this eventually led teams and athletic suppliers to gradually shorten the sleeves on football jerseys to the point that the sleeves were nonexistent and several teams' jersey stripes (including the Steelers) no longer went around the sleeve and in many cases were partially missing. This would eventually spread to all levels of football.

=== Kansas City Chiefs ===
Webster became a free agent after the 1988 season. He was signed by the Kansas City Chiefs, who initially made him an assistant offensive line coach before allowing him to return as the starting center. Webster played two seasons in Kansas City before announcing his retirement on March 11, 1991 and hanging up the cleats after a 17-year career with a total of 245 games played at center.

=== Retirement and legacy ===
At the time of Webster's retirement, he was the last active player in the NFL to have played on all four Super Bowl winning teams of the 1970s Steelers. At the time of his retirement, he had played more seasons as a Steeler than anyone else in franchise history (15 seasons), one season ahead of Terry Bradshaw and Hines Ward. Ben Roethlisberger tied Webster's record in the 2018 season, and broke it in 2019.

Despite the Steelers ceasing officially retiring jersey numbers at the time of his retirement, Webster's No. 52 has not been reissued by the team since he retired in deference to his legacy with the Steelers. In 1999, he was ranked number 75 on The Sporting News' list of the 100 Greatest Football Players. The football stadium at Rhinelander High School, his alma mater, is named Mike Webster Stadium in his honor. Webster was posthumously elected to the Wisconsin Athletic Hall of Fame in 2007.

== Post-football life ==
Webster was proven to have been disabled before retiring from the NFL. After retirement, Webster had amnesia, dementia, depression, and acute bone and muscular pain. He lived out of his pickup truck or in train stations between Wisconsin and Pittsburgh, despite friends and former teammates offering to rent apartments for him. Teammate and fellow hall of fame inductee Terry Bradshaw regularly covered expenses for Webster and his family, while Steelers owner Dan Rooney paid for a hotel room for Webster for over three months. Nonetheless, Webster continued to disappear for weeks at a time without explanation and without contact with friends and family. He exhibited unusual changes in behavior, and became so agitated and restless that he used electroshock weapons on himself to induce sleep.

In his last years Webster lived with his youngest son, Garrett, who though only a teenager at the time, moved from Wisconsin to Pittsburgh to care for his father. Webster's wife Pamela divorced him six months before his death. He died of a heart attack at the age of 50 on September 24, 2002. Webster was cremated and his ashes were returned to his ex-wife and their five children, two sons and three daughters.

=== Illness ===
After death, Webster was diagnosed with chronic traumatic encephalopathy (CTE), a neurodegenerative disease. Webster was the first former NFL player diagnosed with CTE. Dr. Bennet Omalu, a forensic neuropathologist, examined tissue from Webster and eight other NFL players and determined they all showed the kind of brain damage previously seen in people with advanced Alzheimer's disease or dementia, as well as in some retired boxers. Webster's brain resembled those of boxers with "dementia pugilistica", also known as "punch-drunk syndrome". Omalu's findings were largely ignored by the NFL until Cincinnati Bengals wide receiver Chris Henry was diagnosed with CTE shortly after his death at age 26 in 2009. Webster's son Garrett now serves as the administrator to the Brain Injury Research Institute in Pittsburgh, which is dedicated to encouraging individuals who have had head trauma to donate their brains after death as well as being an advocate to players who have similar conditions that his father had.

It has been speculated that Webster's ailments were due to wear and tear sustained over his playing career; some doctors estimated he had been in the equivalent of "25,000 automobile crashes" in over 25 years of playing football at the high school, college and professional levels. His wife Pamela stated years later that she felt that she caused Webster's change in personality in the years before his death and placed guilt on herself over her decision to divorce Webster, until discovering after his death about the CTE diagnosis. Webster played during an era when protective equipment (especially helmets) was inferior, and head injuries were considered part of the game of football. At the time of his death, Webster was addicted to prescription medication.

Nicknamed "Iron Mike", Webster's reputation for durability led him to play even through injuries. So strong was Webster that he was one of eight players that participated in a "Strongest Man in Football" competition that aired on CBS in 1980. While anabolic steroids were considered legal to use during the time of Webster's career, he never publicly stated that he ever used steroids. His struggle with mental illness, as a result of CTE, at the end of his life was depicted in the 2015 film Concussion. Webster was portrayed by David Morse and Dr. Bennet Omalu was portrayed by Will Smith. He is one of at least 345 NFL players to be diagnosed after death with this disease, which is caused by repeated hits to the head.

=== Lawsuit ===
Webster's estate brought a lawsuit in Maryland's United States District Court against the National Football League. The estate contended that Webster was disabled at the time of his retirement, and was owed $1.142 million in disability payments under the NFL's retirement plan. On April 26, 2005, a federal judge ruled that the NFL benefits plan owed Webster's estate $1.18 million in benefits. With the addition of interest and fees, the amount was estimated to be over $1.60 million. The NFL appealed the ruling. On December 13, 2006, the U.S. Court of Appeals for the Fourth Circuit in Richmond, Virginia upheld the Baltimore federal judge's 2005 ruling that the league's retirement plan must pay benefits reserved for players whose disabilities began while they were playing football.

== See also ==
- List of NFL players with chronic traumatic encephalopathy
