= Chronic traumatic encephalopathy =

Neurodegenerative disease caused by head injury

- Other names: traumatic encephalopathy syndrome, dementia pugilistica, punch drunk syndrome
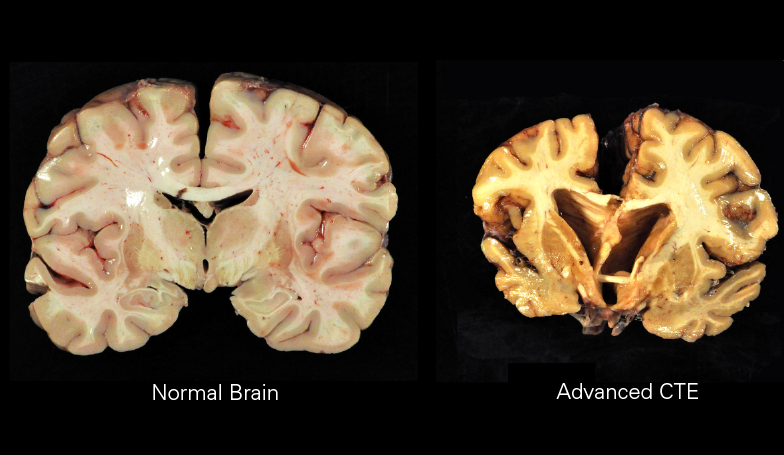
- A normal brain (left) and one with advanced CTE (right)
- Specialty: Neurology, psychiatry, sports medicine
- Symptoms: behavioral problems, mood problems, problems with thinking
- Complications: brain damage, dementia, aggression, depression, suicide
- Usual onset: years after initial injuries
- Causes: repeated head injuries
- Risk factors: contact sports, military service, repeated banging of the head
- Diagnostic method: autopsy
- Differential diagnosis: Alzheimer's disease, Parkinson's disease
- Treatment: supportive care
- Prognosis: worsens over time
- Frequency: uncertain

Chronic traumatic encephalopathy (CTE) is a neurodegenerative disease linked to repeated trauma to the head. The encephalopathy symptoms can include behavioral problems, mood problems, and problems with thinking. The disease often gets worse over time and can result in dementia.

Most documented cases have occurred in athletes involved in striking-based combat sports, such as boxing, kickboxing, and mixed martial arts, and contact sports, such as rugby union, rugby league, gridiron football, Australian rules football, professional wrestling, and ice hockey. It is also an issue in association football, largely as a result of heading the ball rather than player contact. Other risk factors include being in the military (combat arms) or law enforcement, prior domestic violence, and repeated injuries to the head. The amount of trauma required for the condition to occur is unknown, and as of 2026 definitive diagnosis can only occur at autopsy, thus, it can only be diagnosed postmortem. The disease is classified as a tauopathy.

CTE is considered uncommon but significant in the general population, with an estimated rate of ~0.6%–6%, but is highly common among individuals with histories of repetitive head impacts, such as contact sports athletes. A study of donated post-mortem brains of American football players identified CTE in 99% of brains from donated NFL players and 87% of all former players. The risk of CTE is regardless of diagnosed concussions, as it is driven by the cumulative, total number of repetitive head impacts (RHI), also known as subconcussive impacts, rather than diagnosed concussions. Exact population rates are unclear. The largest study has found CTE in 6% of the general population. Research in brain damage as a result of repeated head injuries began in the 1920s, at which time the condition was known as dementia pugilistica or "boxer's dementia", "boxer's madness", or "punch drunk syndrome". It has been proposed that the rules of some sports be changed as a means of prevention. There is no specific treatment for the disease, with research advancing as of 2020.

== Signs and symptoms ==
Symptoms of CTE, which typically occur in four stages, are wide-ranging, can fluctuate, and vary significantly between individuals. The variability is due to factors such as genetics, injury history and location of damage which mean two people with similar impacts can have vastly different clinical presentations and outcomes. There is a delayed onset, and it is common for behavioral changes to begin years or decades after the impacts have stopped. For athletes, symptoms typically appear about 8–14.5 years after retiring from their sport. Patients who present with psychiatric and behavioral issues tend to have a younger age of onset, with a mean age of 35.

Contrary to widespread belief, many people with CTE never go on to commit violent acts, and CTE does not always present with speech issues (dysarthria). Motor features such as this, including parkinsonism, ataxia, and dysarthria, typically appear in a subset of cases, predominantly boxers, due to specific rotational and shearing impacts. Boxing involves frequent, powerful punches to the head that cause rapid rotational acceleration. These "shearing" forces are particularly effective at damaging the brainstem and cerebellum, the areas responsible for speech production, coordination, balance, and motor control.

Multiple studies have indicated that CTE usually presents as one of two distinct forms. One form, typically appearing in a person's 20s or 30s, focuses on behavioral and mood changes (such as anxiety, irritability, impulsivity or mood swings) rather than physical symptoms like dizziness or headaches, although physical symptoms can still occur with this variant. The other form is the cognitive variant, which typically appears later in life, often in a person's late 50s or 60s. While the younger-onset form focuses on mood and behavior, this second form is characterized by significant trouble with memory and executive function, such as difficulty planning, organizing, and multitasking. This variant is much more likely to progress into full-blown dementia. Physical and motor symptoms, such as tremors, balance issues, or Parkinsonism, are more frequently observed in this later-life variant or in the advanced stages of the disease.

Symptoms of both variants can "wax and wane," often resulting in periods where the person's "old self" or some form of clarity appears to return before symptoms worsen again. While CTE is a progressive degenerative disease, its symptoms do not always progress in a straight line and can fluctuate in intensity. A person may have "good days" where their original personality is more present. Fluctuations in symptoms can be influenced by external factors like stress, activity levels, and adequate rest. Symptoms can also fluctuate significantly based on the situation, often appearing differently in structured environments like work compared to more personal settings like home. As the disease reaches advanced stages (Stages 3 and 4), the "old self" typically becomes less visible as the pathology spreads and symptoms like profound memory loss, paranoia, and dementia become more constant.

General symptoms include anger and irritability, memory loss, loss of empathy, confusion, apathy, impaired judgment, impulse control problems, aggression, withdrawal or isolation, depression, and anxiety. Symptoms generally start to appear eight to ten years after an individual experiences repetitive mild traumatic brain injuries. They typically follow a pattern of early behavioral issues followed by later cognitive decline.

Stage 1: In the earliest stage, many individuals are asymptomatic or experience mild, intermittent symptoms that are often dismissed. Symptoms can include, but are not limited to: moodiness, emotional lability, difficulty with attention and concentration, hyper vigilance or mild paranoia, depression or irritability, headaches and occasional dizziness, loss of interest in previously enjoyed activities (anhedonia), and short-term memory deficits. Personality change begins in this stage, often noticeable only to those closest to the patient.

Dizziness and headaches, while recognized symptoms of CTE and sometimes reported in early stages, are not required for the diagnoses of traumatic encephalopathy syndrome. Especially in the behavioral variant, physical symptoms like dizziness or balance issues are not required for diagnosis and may never appear. As well, a small group of patients with predominantly behavioral or mood symptoms can remain stable for years, sometimes 11 to 14 years, before any other cognitive or physical symptoms progress.

These subtle changes can be easily missed or attributed to other causes or conditions, such as personality disorders, mood disorders, or attachment styles before progressing. In particular among those is an Obsessive–compulsive personality disorder (OCPD) pattern of personality traits, as OCPD displays high correlation with both traumatic brain injury and parkinsonism and the "parkinsonism personality" profile. Parkinsonism and thus its characteristics are highly linked to CTE, with approximately 25% of patients with CTE having traits of parkinsonism.

Stage 2: Symptoms become more frequent and impact social or professional life. This stage is often defined by explosive emotional shifts. Symptoms can include loss of empathy, executive dysfunction, increased aggression or irritability including outbursts or withdrawal, poor impulse control, and worsening emotional instability. In the context of relationships by this stage, CTE can contribute to a cycle of abuse where the individual has poor impulse control and struggles to regulate anger. The disease can manifest in various ways within relationships, such as jealousy, high-conflict personality when attempting to communicate, stonewalling, grudge-holding (perseveration), sometimes with obsessiveness and paranoia. Short-term memory loss can become more pronounced.

Stage 3: Stage three is characterized by significant cognitive decline. Symptoms can include worsening executive dysfunction and visuospatial difficulties such as getting lost in familiar places, significant memory loss, and a loss of insight into their own condition (anosognosia). Profound apathy may be present, as well as difficulty maintaining focus.

Stage 4: The final stage (usually reached around age 50–60 for those with the behavioral variant) is characterized by advanced dementia. Symptoms can include severe memory loss, psychotic symptoms including paranoia, severe personality changes, parkinsonism, slurred speech, and unsteady gait.

Autonomic symptoms may or may not be present. They are similar to those of other TBIs, and can include abnormal sweating (excess or reduced), temperature sensitivities, abnormally low heart rate (bradycardia) or high heart rate (tachycardia), seizures (aural seizures or Post-Traumatic Epilepsy) and neurogenic or psychogenic fevers.

Additional symptoms include dysarthria, dysphagia, cognitive disorders such as amnesia, and ocular abnormalities, such as ptosis. Patients with CTE may be prone to inappropriate or explosive behavior and may display pathological jealousy or paranoia.

=== Comorbidity ===
==== Parkinsonism ====
In individuals with diagnosed CTE, roughly 24.7% exhibited parkinsonism during their lives. It has been found that the risk of developing Lewy Body Disease or advanced parkinsonism increases by roughly 50% for every 8 years of participation in contact sports. While typical Parkinson's disease is defined by Lewy bodies, most (75.9%) of CTE donors with parkinsonism did not have Lewy bodies. Instead, their symptoms were primarily driven by CTE-related tau pathology and neuronal loss in the areas associated with classic parkinsonism (the substantia nigra). CTE patients with parkinsonism were typically older at death (average age 71.5 vs. 54.1) and had more advanced CTE (such as Stage IV) than those without motor symptoms.

==== Lou Gehrig's disease ====
There is an association between head trauma and amyotrophic lateral sclerosis (ALS), or Lou Gehrig's disease, in which the risk of ALS has been reported to be higher among contact sport athletes and veterans. Lou Gehrig was famous as a baseball player, a sport with minimal contact, but he had suffered numerous concussions as a football player in his early career. There is a possible link between intense or repetitive head trauma and an ALS-like motor neuron disease in some individuals, sometimes referred to as CTE-M or CTE-ALS. 4-6% of those with CTE ended up demonstrating either clinical or pathological characteristics of ALS (referred to as CTE-ALS), and the exact mechanism for the correlation between the two disorders remains unclear. It is known that both diseases involve abnormal protein accumulations. While CTE is primarily a tauopathy, ALS is often linked to a protein called TDP-43, which is also frequently found in advanced CTE cases.

Patients with both conditions (comorbid ALS and CTE) often experience a more severe clinical course, including earlier behavioral changes, with speech and swallowing being affected earlier than in typical ALS.

==== Substance misuse ====
High rates of alcohol and drug abuse are documented in patients with suspected CTE, often as a way to self-medicate for chronic pain, mood swings, or sleep issues.

== Cause ==
CTE is not caused by a single concussion, but by repetitive, long-term hits to the head, often occurring over many years. Most documented cases have occurred in athletes with mild repetitive head impacts (RHI) over an extended period. Evidence indicates that repetitive concussive and subconcussive blows to the head cause CTE. In particular, it is associated with contact sports such as boxing, American football, Australian rules football, wrestling, mixed martial arts, ice hockey, rugby, and association football. "In association football, research has since confirmed that heading the ball is the primary mechanism of risk, leading countries such as England and Scotland to ban heading in youth training as of 2020.". Other potential risk factors include military personnel (repeated exposure to explosive charges or large caliber ordnance), domestic violence, and repeated impact to the head. Although many military personnel are around blasts and explosions very often, it is very rare for these personnel to be diagnosed with CTE. Studies have shown that 4.4% of deceased military veterans have been diagnosed with CTE. Exposure to blasts from explosives can produce symptoms of CTE.

The exact amount of trauma required for the condition to occur is unknown. Scientists are finding that there isn't a safe specific number of hits, but rather a threshold. Once someone's brain receives a certain amount of "force" over their lifetime, the tau protein starts to misfold and spread, even if the hits stop.

== Pathology ==
The neuropathological appearance of CTE is distinguished from other tauopathies, such as Alzheimer's disease. The four clinical stages of observable CTE disability have been correlated with tau pathology in brain tissue, ranging in severity from focal perivascular epicenters of neurofibrillary tangles in the frontal neocortex to severe tauopathy affecting widespread brain regions.

The primary physical manifestations of CTE include a reduction in brain weight, associated with atrophy of the frontal and temporal cortices and medial temporal lobe. The lateral ventricles and the third ventricle are often enlarged, with rare instances of dilation of the fourth ventricle. Other physical manifestations of CTE include anterior cavum septi pellucidi and posterior fenestrations, pallor of the substantia nigra and locus ceruleus, and atrophy of the olfactory bulbs, thalamus, mammillary bodies, brainstem and cerebellum. As CTE progresses, there may be marked atrophy of the hippocampus, entorhinal cortex, and amygdala.

On a microscopic scale, a pathognomonic CTE lesion involves p-tau aggregates in neurons, with or without thorn-shaped astrocytes, at the depths of the cortical sulcus around a small blood vessel, deep in the parenchyma, and not restricted to the subpial and superficial region of the sulcus; the pathognomonic lesion must include p-tau in neurons to distinguish CTE from aging-related tau astrogliopathy (ARTAG). Supporting features of CTE are: superficial neurofibrillary tangles (NFTs); p–tau in CA2 and CA4 hippocampus; p-tau in: mammillary bodies, hypothalamic nuclei, amygdala, nucleus accumbens, thalamus, midbrain tegmentum, nucleus basalis of Meynert, raphe nuclei, substantia nigra and locus coeruleus; p-tau thorn-shaped astrocytes (TSA) in the subpial region; p-tau dot-like neurites. Purely astrocytic perivascular p-tau pathology represents ARTAG and does not meet the criteria for CTE.

A small group of individuals with CTE have chronic traumatic encephalomyopathy (CTEM), which is characterized by symptoms of motor-neuron disease and which mimics amyotrophic lateral sclerosis (ALS). Progressive muscle weakness and balance and gait problems (problems with walking) seem to be early signs of CTEM.

Exosome vesicles created by the brain are potential biomarkers of TBI, including CTE.

Loss of neurons, scarring of brain tissue, collection of proteinaceous senile plaques, hydrocephalus, attenuation of the corpus callosum, diffuse axonal injury, neurofibrillary tangles, and damage to the cerebellum are implicated in the syndrome. Neurofibrillary tangles have been found in the brains of dementia pugilistica patients, but not in the same distribution as is usually found in people with Alzheimer's. One group examined slices of brain from patients having had multiple mild traumatic brain injuries and found changes in the cells' cytoskeletons, which they suggested might be due to damage to cerebral blood vessels.

== Diagnosis ==
There is currently no definitive test to prove the presence of CTE in a living person. In the living, possible CTE is instead diagnosed as traumatic encephalopathy syndrome using the 2021 NINDS Consensus Criteria. Traumatic Encephalopathy Syndrome (TES) is the clinical diagnosis used to describe the symptoms of a living person suspected of having CTE. While CTE can only be definitively diagnosed after death via brain autopsy, TES allows doctors to identify and manage the condition's progressive cognitive and behavioral impacts in living patients. Significant progress has been made in research, with some experts predicting diagnosis via blood test and/or PET scan could be available for clinical use within a few years.

The lack of distinct biomarkers is the reason CTE cannot typically be diagnosed while a person is alive. Concussions are non-structural injuries and do not result in brain bleeding, which is why most concussions cannot be spotted on routine neuroimaging tests such as CT or MRI. Acute concussion symptoms (those that occur shortly after an injury) should not be confused with CTE. Differentiating between prolonged post-concussion syndrome (PCS, where symptoms begin shortly after a concussion and last for weeks, months, and sometimes even years) and CTE symptoms can be difficult. Research studies are examining whether neuroimaging can detect subtle changes in axonal integrity and structural lesions that can occur in CTE. By the early 2010s, more progress in in-vivo diagnostic techniques for CTE had been made, using DTI, fMRI, MRI, and MRS imaging; however, more research needs to be done before any such techniques can be validated.

PET tracers that bind specifically to tau protein are desired to aid the diagnosis of CTE in living individuals. One candidate is the tracer [^{18}F]FDDNP, which is retained in the brain in individuals with several dementing disorders such as Alzheimer's disease, Down syndrome, progressive supranuclear palsy, corticobasal degeneration, familial frontotemporal dementia, and Creutzfeldt–Jakob disease. In a small study of 5 retired NFL players with cognitive and mood symptoms, the PET scans revealed accumulation of the tracer in their brains. However, [^{18}F]FDDNP binds to beta-amyloid and other proteins as well. Moreover, the sites in the brain where the tracer was retained were inconsistent with the known neuropathology of CTE. A more promising candidate is the tracer [^{18}F]-T807, which binds only to tau. It is being tested in several clinical trials.

A putative biomarker for CTE is the presence in serum of autoantibodies against the brain. The autoantibodies were detected in football players who experienced a large number of head hits but no concussions, suggesting that even sub-concussive episodes may be damaging to the brain. The autoantibodies may enter the brain using a disrupted blood-brain barrier, and attack neuronal cells, which are normally protected from an immune onslaught. Given the large numbers of neurons present in the brain (86 billion), and considering the poor penetration of antibodies across a normal blood-brain barrier, there is an extended period between the initial events (head hits) and the development of any signs or symptoms. Nevertheless, autoimmune changes in blood of players may constitute the earliest measurable event predicting CTE.

=== Imaging ===
Although the diagnosis of CTE cannot be determined by imaging, the effects of head trauma may be seen with the use of structural imaging. Imaging techniques include the use of magnetic resonance imaging, nuclear magnetic resonance spectroscopy, CT scan, single-photon emission computed tomography, Diffusion MRI, and Positron emission tomography (PET). One specific use of imaging is the use of a PET scan to evaluate for tau deposition, which has been conducted on retired NFL players.

Research published in 2026 found that using MRI on living patients to detect a leaky blood-brain barrier can be used as an early warning sign for CTE development in patients with a history of repetitive head impact exposure. These scans focused on the blood-brain barrier could serve as an early warning system, identifying athletes at the highest risk for future brain disease while they are still living and possibly while still playing.

== Prevention ==
The use of helmets and mouth guards has been put forward as a possible preventative measure; though neither has significant research to support its use, both have been shown to reduce direct head trauma. Although there is no significant research to support the use of helmets to reduce the risk of concussions, there is evidence to support that helmet use reduces impact forces. The sports in which a helmet was effective in preventing TBI and concussions were skiing and snowboarding. Mouth guards have been shown to decrease dental injuries, but again have not shown significant evidence to reduce concussions. Because repeated impacts are thought to increase the likelihood of CTE development, a growing area of practice is improved recognition and treatment for concussions and other head trauma; removal from sport participation during recovery from these traumatic injuries is essential. Proper return-to-play protocol after possible brain injuries is also important in decreasing the significance of future impacts.

Medications to prevent tau misfolding and aggregation are currently under investigation, with several in clinical trials, but none having been approved. Key therapeutic approaches include tau aggregation inhibitors, kinase inhibitors to reduce phosphorylation, and tau immunotherapies designed to block the spread of toxic tau.

Efforts are being made to change the rules of contact sports to reduce the frequency and severity of blows to the head. Examples of these rule changes are the evolution of tackling technique rules in American football, such as the banning of helmet-first tackles, and the addition of rules to protect defenseless players. Likewise, another growing area of debate is better implementation of rules already in place to protect athletes.

Because of the concern that boxing may cause CTE, there is a movement among medical professionals to ban the sport. Medical professionals have called for such a ban as early as the 1950s.

== Management ==
No disease-modifying therapy exists for CTE, and it cannot be diagnosed until a post-mortem autopsy is performed. Treatment is supportive as with other forms of dementia. Those with CTE-related symptoms may receive medication and non-medication-related treatments. Currently, there is no way to stop or slow the development of CTE. However, medications like Aricept (donepezil) and Namenda (memantine) can mitigate memory loss and confusion, and Aricept can improve memory, motivation, and attention by increasing acetylcholine levels in the brain. Memantine is a cognitive enhancer that can help with memory loss and confusion. These medications are also treatments for Alzheimer's disease and dementia. There are also antidepressants like selective serotonin reuptake inhibitors (SSRIs), which can potentially help manage some of the behavioral and emotional symptoms associated with chronic traumatic encephalopathy (CTE) and may have a small improvement in memory function, mood, and alertness. SSRIs are often the first choice of treatment for CTE due to their effectiveness.

Low-level laser therapy (LLLT), also known as photobiomodulation, is being investigated as a promising, non-invasive potential treatment for CTE symptoms and the underlying brain damage caused by repetitive head impacts. Research into its application for brain injuries is primarily in the stage of case studies and small clinical trials, with strong evidence from animal models.

== Epidemiology ==
Rates of disease vary widely according to exposure group. CTE has been diagnosed post-mortem in 99% of NFL players studied, 96% of studied NHL players, and over 40% of youth, high school, and college athletes under the age of 30. Population rates, however, are unclear. Tracking the epidemiology of CTE is difficult due to the inability to diagnose this syndrome during life.

Professional level athletes are the largest group with CTE, due to frequent concussions and sub-concussive impacts from play in contact sport. These contact-sports include American football, Australian rules football, ice hockey, Rugby football (Rugby union and Rugby league), boxing, kickboxing, mixed martial arts, association football, and wrestling. In association football, only prolific headers are known to have developed CTE. Cases of CTE have also been recorded in baseball. While not a contact sport, dangers include collisions between fielders, being struck by a ball travelling at 90 to 105 miles per hour (145 to 169 km/h) and collisions at bases with other players.

According to a 2017 study on brains of deceased football players that were donated to a brain bank, 99% of tested brains of NFL players, 88% of CFL players, 64% of semi-professional players, 91% of college football players, and 21% of high school football players had various stages of CTE. A 2023 study found the presence of CTE in over 40% of all athletes exposed to repetitive head impacts and who had died before the age of 30.

In regards to ice hockey, as with other sports, the risk is highly linked to career duration. The odds of developing CTE increase by 34% for every additional year of hockey played. The following percentages have been determined from study: < 13 years of play has a ~19% prevalence of CTE. 13–23 years of play has a ~52% prevalence. 23 years of play has a ~96% prevalence. In 69% of cases studied, other neuropathologies were present, 54% of which coexisted alongside CTE, highlighting that CTE frequently co-occurs with other brain pathologies rather than developing in isolation.

As reported in a study published by Roberts, about 11% of the retired boxers he examined had a mild case of CTE, and about 6% of the boxers had major neurological problems. Through these clinical examinations, Roberts was able to establish associations between exposure to violence and the effects of CTE. He stated that among the boxers who are over the age of 50 and fought in over 150 fights, about 50% of them had CTE. This number was compared to the 7% of the boxers who had CTE and had less than 50 fights.

Other individuals diagnosed with CTE were those involved in military or police service, had a previous history of chronic seizures, were domestically abused, or were involved in activities resulting in repetitive head collisions.

== History ==
CTE was originally studied in boxers in the 1920s as "punch-drunk syndrome." The punch-drunk syndrome was first described in 1928 by a forensic pathologist, Harrison Stanford Martland, who was the chief medical examiner of Essex County in Newark, New Jersey, in a Journal of the American Medical Association article, in which he noted the tremors, slowed movement, confusion and speech problems typical of the condition. The term "punch-drunk" was replaced with "dementia pugilistica" in 1937 by J.A. Millsbaugh, as he felt the term was condescending to former boxers. The initial diagnosis of dementia pugilistica was derived from the Latin word for boxer, pugil (akin to pugnus 'fist', pugnāre 'to fight').

Other terms for the condition have included chronic boxer's encephalopathy, traumatic boxer's encephalopathy, boxer's dementia, pugilistic dementia, and chronic traumatic brain injury associated with boxing (CTBI-B).

Neurologist Macdonald Critchley wrote a 1949 paper titled "Punch-drunk syndromes: the chronic traumatic encephalopathy of boxers". CTE was first recognized as affecting individuals who took considerable blows to the head, but was believed to be confined to boxers and not other athletes. As evidence pertaining to the clinical and neuropathological consequences of repeated mild head trauma grew, it became clear that this pattern of neurodegeneration was not restricted to boxers, and the term chronic traumatic encephalopathy became most widely used.

In 2002, pathologist Bennet Omalu performed an autopsy on prominent American football player Mike Webster. Omalu expected the autopsy to reveal a brain affected by Alzheimer's. Instead, after fixing and dissecting the brain, Omalu observed abnormal proteins tangles that distinguish CTE from Alzheimer's disease. Omalu concluded that Webster was the first person to be officially diagnosed with CTE.

A famous case of CTE is that of former NFL player Aaron Hernandez. Two years into a jail sentence for murder, Hernandez was found dead after he hanged himself in his cell. An autopsy found stage 3 CTE, a severity rarely seen at his age of 27 at death.

In October 2022, the United States National Institutes of Health formally acknowledged there was a causal link between repeated blows to the head and CTE.

== Research ==
Research on chronic traumatic encephalopathy has been done but challenges remain, particularly due to the fact that CTE cannot be properly diagnosed until the subject is deceased. Of this research, both individual case studies and larger surveys have taken place, aided by donations.

=== Donations ===
In 2008, twelve living athletes (active and retired), including hockey players Pat LaFontaine and Noah Welch as well as former NFL star Ted Johnson, committed to donate their brains to VA-BU-CLF Brain Bank after their deaths. In 2009, NFL Pro Bowlers Matt Birk, Lofa Tatupu, and Sean Morey pledged to donate their brains to the VA-BU-CLF Brain Bank. In 2010, 20 more NFL players and former players pledged to join the VA-BU-CLF Brain Donation Registry, including Chicago Bears linebacker Hunter Hillenmeyer, Hall of Famers Mike Haynes and Zach Thomas, Pro Bowlers Kyle Turley, and Conrad Dobler, Super Bowl Champion Don Hasselbeck and former pro players Lew Carpenter, and Todd Hendricks. In 2010, professional wrestlers Mick Foley, Booker T and Matt Morgan also agreed to donate their brains upon their deaths. Also in 2010, MLS player Taylor Twellman, who had to retire from the New England Revolution because of post-concussion symptoms, agreed to donate his brain upon his death. As of 2010, the VA-BU-CLF Brain Donation Registry consists of over 250 current and former athletes.

In related research, the Center for the Study of Retired Athletes, which is part of the Department of Exercise and Sport Science at the University of North Carolina at Chapel Hill, is conducting research funded by National Football League Charities to "study former football players, a population with a high prevalence of exposure to prior Mild Traumatic Brain Injury (MTBI) and sub-concussive impacts, in order to investigate the association between increased football exposure and recurrent MTBI and neurodegenerative disorders such as cognitive impairment and Alzheimer's disease (AD)".

In 2011, former North Queensland Cowboys player Shaun Valentine became the first Australian National Rugby League player to agree to donate his brain upon his death, in response to recent concerns about the effects of concussions on Rugby League players, who do not use helmets. Also in 2011, boxer Micky Ward, whose career inspired the film The Fighter, agreed to donate his brain upon his death. In 2018, NASCAR driver Dale Earnhardt Jr., who retired in 2017 citing multiple concussions, became the first auto racing competitor to agree to donate his brain upon his death.

=== Individual studies ===
In 2005, forensic pathologist Bennet Omalu, along with colleagues in the Department of Pathology at the University of Pittsburgh, published a paper, "Chronic Traumatic Encephalopathy in a National Football League Player", in the journal Neurosurgery, based on analysis of the brain of deceased former NFL center Mike Webster. This was then followed by a paper on a second case in 2006 describing similar pathology, based on findings in the brain of former NFL player Terry Long.

In February 2011, former NFL player Dave Duerson committed suicide via a gunshot to his chest, thus leaving his brain intact. Duerson left text messages to loved ones asking that his brain be donated to research for CTE. The family got in touch with representatives of the Boston University center studying the condition, said Robert Stern, the co-director of the research group. Stern said Duerson's gift was the first time of which he was aware that such a request had been made by someone who had committed suicide that was potentially linked to CTE. Stern and his colleagues found high levels of the protein tau in Duerson's brain. These elevated levels, which were abnormally clumped and pooled along the brain sulci, are indicative of CTE.

In July 2010, NHL enforcer Bob Probert died of heart failure. Before his death, he asked his wife to donate his brain to CTE research because it was noticed that Probert experienced a mental decline in his 40s. In March 2011, researchers at Boston University concluded that Probert had CTE upon analysis of the brain tissue he donated. He was the second NHL player from the program at the BU CTE Center to be diagnosed with CTE postmortem.

In 2017, Aaron Hernandez, a former professional football player and convicted murderer, committed suicide at the age of 27 while in prison. His family donated his brain to the BU CTE Center. Ann McKee, the head of Center, concluded that "Hernandez had Stage 3 CTE, which researchers had never seen in a brain younger than 46 years old."

In 2022, former NRL player and coach Paul Green died by suicide at the age of 49. Green's brain was donated to the Australian Sports Brain Bank, with his family posting on the website "In memory of our beloved Paul, we ask that you support the pioneering work of the Australian Sports Brain Bank" to raise money for further understanding of CTE. A post-mortem examination revealed that Green was suffering from one of the most "severe forms" of CTE. Professor Michael Buckland said Green had "an organic brain disease which robbed him of his decision-making and impulse control." He added Green would likely have been "symptomatic for some time."

In 2023, Australian rules football player Heather Anderson became the first female athlete diagnosed with CTE after her death by suicide on 13 November 2022, at the age of 28. Her brain, which was donated to the Australian Sports Brain Bank, was found to contain multiple CTE lesions, and abnormalities were found "nearly everywhere" in the cortex. Also in 2023, a study was published on 28 August in JAMA Neurology regarding brain autopsies of athletes, one of whom was the first American female athlete diagnosed with CTE; her name is unknown, but she died at age 28 and was a collegiate soccer player.

In March 2024, former rugby union player Billy Guyton became the first New Zealand-based athlete diagnosed with CTE following his forced retirement in 2018, due to the complications of multiple concussions, and his death by suspected suicide in 2023. His brain had been donated by his family to the Neurological Foundation Human Brain Bank at the University of Auckland, with post-mortem analyses conducted in New Zealand and Australia eventually finding "background changes consistent with global hypoxic ischaemic encephalopathy", as well as trauma-induced cavum septi pellucidi and age-related tau deposits.

=== Collective studies and reviews ===
In 2008, the Center for the Study of Traumatic Encephalopathy at the BU School of Medicine (now the BU CTE Center) started the VA-BU-CLF Brain Bank at the Bedford Veterans Administration Hospital to analyze the effects of CTE and other neurodegenerative diseases on the brain and spinal cord of athletes, military veterans, and civilians. To date, the VA-BU-CLF Brain Bank is the largest CTE tissue repository in the world, with over 1000 brain donors.

On 21 December 2009, the National Football League Players Association announced that it would collaborate with the BU CTE Center to support the center's study of repetitive brain trauma in athletes. Additionally, in 2010 the National Football League gave the BU CTE Center a $1 million gift with no strings attached.

The BU CTE Center has also found indications of links between amyotrophic lateral sclerosis (ALS) and CTE in athletes who have participated in contact sports. Tissue for the study was donated by twelve athletes and their families to the VA-BU-CLF Brain Bank at the Bedford, Massachusetts VA Medical Center.

In 2013, President Barack Obama announced the creation of the Chronic Effects of Neurotrauma Consortium or CENC, a federally funded research project devised to address the long-term effects of mild traumatic brain injury in military service personnel (SMs) and veterans. The CENC is a multi-center collaboration linking premiere basic science, translational, and clinical neuroscience researchers from the DoD, VA, academic universities, and private research institutes to effectively address the scientific, diagnostic, and therapeutic ramifications of mild TBI and its long-term effects.

Nearly 20% of the more than 2.5 million U.S. service members (SMs) deployed since 2003 to Operation Enduring Freedom (OEF) and Operation Iraqi Freedom (OIF) have sustained at least one traumatic brain injury (TBI), predominantly concussions (mTBI), and almost 8% of all OEF/OIF Veterans demonstrate persistent post-TBI symptoms more than six months post-injury. Unlike those head injuries incurred in most sporting events, recent military head injuries are most often the result of blast wave exposure.

After a competitive application process, a consortium led by Virginia Commonwealth University was awarded funding to study brain injuries in military veterans. The project principal investigator for the CENC is David Cifu, chairman and Herman J. Flax professor of the Department of Physical Medicine and Rehabilitation (PM&R) at Virginia Commonwealth University (VCU) in Richmond, Virginia, with co-principal investigators Ramon Diaz-Arrastia, Professor of Neurology, Uniformed Services University of the Health Sciences, and Rick L. Williams, statistician at RTI International.

Research into the genetic component of CTE is evolving and well summarized in a recent review. The minor allele of TMEM106B is associated with a protective phenotype.

In August 2026, researchers examined data from 2016 to 2021 and came to the conclusion that 1 in 4, though likely more, NFL players will be diagnosed with CTE. Over the full study period, 93.2% of the donated brains of NFL players showed CTE pathology. The study analyzed several stages of CTE, causes of death, and death age, finding a mean death age of 66.5, a figure significantly associated with Stage 4. It also found that dementia was common among the deceased, at a rate of 59.8%.

== See also ==
- Acquired brain injury
- Brain damage
- Chronic traumatic encephalopathy in sports
- Concussions in American football
- Concussions in rugby union
- Health issues in American football
  - List of NFL players with chronic traumatic encephalopathy
  - Chuck Bednarik
  - The Hit (Chuck Bednarik)
- Traumatic brain injury
