= 1985 Pittsburgh Steelers season =

Pittsburgh Steelers 53rd US football season

- Owner: Art Rooney
- General manager: Dick Haley
- Head coach: Chuck Noll
- Home stadium: Three Rivers Stadium

Results
- Record: 7–9
- Division place: 2nd AFC Central
- Playoffs: Did not qualify
- All-Pros: Louis Lipps (2nd team)
- Pro Bowlers: PK Gary Anderson; WR Louis Lipps; LB Mike Merriweather; C Mike Webster
- Team MVP: Louis Lipps
- Team ROY: Harry Newsome

The 1985 Pittsburgh Steelers season was the franchise's 53rd season as a professional sports franchise and as a member of the National Football League. The Steelers challenged for the AFC Central most of the season, sitting at 6–5 after their first eleven games. However, losing 4 out of their final 5 games dropped the Steelers to a 7–9 overall record, their first season with a losing record in fourteen years.

== Offseason ==
=== NFL draft ===
1985 Pittsburgh Steelers draft
Round	Pick	Player	Position	College	Notes
1	20	Darryl Sims	Defensive tackle	Wisconsin	
2	47	Mark Behning	Offensive tackle	Nebraska	
3	74	Liffort Hobley	Safety	LSU	
4	101	Dan Turk	Center	Wisconsin	
5	136	Cam Jacobs	Linebacker	Kentucky	
6	160	Gregg Carr	Linebacker	Auburn	
7	187	Alan Andrews	Tight end	Rutgers	
8	214	Harry Newsome	Punter	Wake Forest	
9	241	Fred Small	Linebacker	Washington	
9	242	Andre Harris	Defensive back	Minnesota	
10	268	Oliver White	Tight end	Kentucky	
11	300	Terry Matichak	Defensive back	Missouri	
12	327	Jeff Sanchez	Defensive back	Georgia	
Made roster

=== Undrafted free agents ===
1985 undrafted free agents of note
Player	Position	College
Danny Andrews	Defensive back	UCLA
Andrew Baker	Wide receiver	Rutgers
Charlie Dickey	Guard	Arizona
Steve DeVries	Linebacker	Northwestern College (Iowa)
Dave Edwards	Safety	Illinois
Frank Goode	Linebacker	Youngstown State
Preston Gothard	Tight end	Alabama
Dwayne Hooper	Running back	Rutgers
Alan Huff	Defensive tackle	Marshall
Tom Linebarger	Defensive tackle	SMU
Steve Little	Defensive tackle	Iowa State
Dwayne McMullen	Wide receiver	Minnesota
Frank Pokorny	Wide receiver	Youngstown State
Kevin Powell	Defensive tackle	Youngstown State
Marc Quinlivan	Wide receiver	Yale

== Personnel ==
=== Staff ===
1985 Pittsburgh Steelers staff
Front office: Chairman of the board – Arthur J. Rooney; President – Daniel M. Rooney; Vice president – John R. McGinley; Vice president – Arthur J. Rooney, Jr.; Controller – Dennis P. Thimons; Assistant controller-management – Dan Ferens; Traveling secretary – James A. Boston; Publicity director – Joe Gordon; Director of ticket sales – Geraldine Glenn; Assistant controller-tickets – Jim Ellenberger; Director of player personnel – Dick Haley; Assistant director of player personnel – William Nunn, Jr.; Pro talent scout – Tom Modrak; Talent scout – West Coast – Bob Schmitz; Talent scout – Midwest – Mike Butler; College talent scout – Joe Krupa; Head coaches: Head coach – Chuck Noll; Offensive coaches: Offensive coordinator – Tom Moore; Offensive Line: Tackles/Tight Ends – Ron Blackledge; Offensive backfield – Dick Hoak; Offensive Line: Centers/Guards – Hal Hunter	Defensive coaches: Defensive coordinator – Tony Dungy; Inside linebackers – Dennis Fitzgerald; Outside linebackers – Jed Hughes; Defensive line – Jon Kolb; Strength and conditioning: Conditioning coach – Walt Evans; Dentist – Dr. George P. Boucek; Ophthalmologist – Dr. Phillip Buzzelli; Physician, M.D. – Dr. David S. Huber; Neurological surgery consultant – Dr. Joseph C. Maroon; Physician, M.D. – Dr. Richard Rydze; Physician, orthopedic – Dr. Paul Steele; Physician, M.D. – Dr. Anthony P. Yates; Trainer – Ralph Berlin; Trainer – Gary Stragar; Equipment manager – Anthony Parisi; Field manager – Rodgers Freyvogel; Film director – Bob McCartney; Photographers – Mike Fabus, Bill Amatucci

=== Roster ===
1985 Pittsburgh Steelers roster
Quarterbacks (QB): 10 Scott Campbell; 16 Mark Malone; 19 David Woodley; Running backs (RB): 34 Walter Abercrombie; 24 Rich Erenberg; 30 Frank Pollard; 47 Steve Morse; 36 Todd Spencer; Wide receivers (WR): 83 Louis Lipps; 80 Frank Pokorny; 82 John Stallworth; 85 Calvin Sweeney; 87 Weegie Thompson; Tight ends (TE): 89 Bennie Cunningham; 86 Preston Gothard	Offensive linemen (OL): 71 Emil Boures G; 62 Tunch Ilkin T; 74 Terry Long G; 65 Ray Pinney T; 60 Randy Rasmussen G/C; 63 Pete Rostosky T; 52 Mike Webster C; 73 Craig Wolfley G; Defensive linemen (DL): 78 Mark Catano NT; 67 Gary Dunn NT; 92 Keith Gary DE; 95 John Goodman DE; 99 Darryl Sims DE; 93 Keith Willis DE	Linebackers (LB): 91 Gregg Carr OLB; 56 Robin Cole ILB; 53 Bryan Hinkle OLB; 50 David Little ILB; 57 Mike Merriweather OLB; 54 Fred Small ILB; 55 Dennis Winston ILB; Defensive backs (DB): 33 Harvey Clayton CB; 31 Donnie Shell SS; 26 John Swain CB; 25 Anthony Tuggle SS; 21 Eric Williams FS; 49 Dwayne Woodruff CB; 22 Rick Woods CB/FS; Special teams (ST): 1 Gary Anderson K; 18 Harry Newsome P	Reserve: -- Alan Andrews TE (IR); 66 Mark Behning T (IR); 23 Chris Brown CB (IR); 42 Dave Edwards S (IR); 68 Russ Graham T (IR); 29 Dwayne Hooper T (IR); 48 Cam Jacobs LB (IR); 90 Bob Kohrs LB (IR); 64 Edmund Nelson DE (IR); 51 Dan Turk C (IR); 28 Robert Williams S (IR); Rookies in italics

== Preseason ==
=== Schedule ===
Week	Date	Opponent	Game Site	Kickoff (ET)	TV	Result	Record
1	Saturday, August 10	at Tampa Bay Buccaneers	Tampa Stadium	8:00 p.m.	WTAE	W 42–27	1–0
2	Saturday, August 17	at Minnesota Vikings	Hubert H. Humphrey Metrodome	8:00 p.m.	WTAE	L 41–34	1–1
3	Friday, August 23	at St. Louis Cardinals	Busch Stadium	8:30 p.m.	WTAE	L 14–6	1–2
4	Friday, August 30	New York Giants	Three Rivers Stadium	7:30 p.m.	WTAE	L 24–14	1–3

== Regular season ==
=== Schedule ===
Week	Date	Opponent	Game Site	Kickoff (ET)	TV	Result	Record
1	Sunday, September 8	Indianapolis Colts	Three Rivers Stadium	1:00 p.m.	NBC	W 45–3	1–0
2	Monday, September 16	at Cleveland Browns	Cleveland Municipal Stadium	9:00 p.m.	ABC	L 17–7	1–1
3	Sunday, September 22	Houston Oilers	Three Rivers Stadium	1:00 p.m.	NBC	W 20–0	2–1
4	Monday, September 30	Cincinnati Bengals	Three Rivers Stadium	9:00 p.m.	ABC	L 37–24	2–2
5	Sunday, October 6	at Miami Dolphins	Miami Orange Bowl	1:00 p.m.	NBC	L 24–20	2–3
6	Sunday, October 13	at Dallas Cowboys	Texas Stadium	1:00 p.m.	NBC	L 27–13	2–4
7	Sunday, October 20	St. Louis Cardinals	Three Rivers Stadium	1:00 p.m.	CBS	W 23–10	3–4
8	Sunday, October 27	at Cincinnati Bengals	Riverfront Stadium	4:00 p.m.	NBC	L 26–21	3–5
9	Sunday, November 3	Cleveland Browns	Three Rivers Stadium	1:00 p.m.	NBC	W 10–9	4–5
10	Sunday, November 10	at Kansas City Chiefs	Arrowhead Stadium	1:00 p.m.	NBC	W 36–28	5–5
11	Sunday, November 17	at Houston Oilers	Astrodome	1:00 p.m.	NBC	W 30–7	6–5
12	Sunday, November 24	Washington Redskins	Three Rivers Stadium	1:00 p.m.	CBS	L 30–23	6–6
13	Sunday, December 1	Denver Broncos	Three Rivers Stadium	1:00 p.m.	NBC	L 31–23	6–7
14	Sunday, December 8	at San Diego Chargers	Jack Murphy Stadium	9:00 p.m.	ABC	L 54–44	6–8
15	Sunday, December 15	Buffalo Bills	Three Rivers Stadium	1:00 p.m.	NBC	W 30–24	7–8
16	Saturday, December 21	at New York Giants	Giants Stadium	12:30 p.m.	NBC	L 28–10	7–9

=== Week 1: vs. Indianapolis Colts ===
Indianapolis Colts at Pittsburgh Steelers

Quarter	1	2	3	4	Total
Colts	3	0	0	0	3
Steelers	7	17	7	14	45

at Three Rivers Stadium, Pittsburgh, Pennsylvania

- Date: September 8, 1985
- Game time: 1:00 pm EDT
- Game weather: 79 °F (26.1 °C), wind 9 miles per hour (14 km/h; 7.8 kn)
- Game attendance: 55,279
- Referee: Red Cashion
- TV announcers (NBC): Jay Randolph (play by play), Sam Rutigliano (color commentator)

Scoring summary

Quarter	Time	Drive			Team	Scoring information	Score	
Quarter	Time	Plays	Yards	TOP	Team	Scoring information	Colts	Steelers
1					Steelers	Louis Lipps 7-yard touchdown reception from Mark Malone, Gary Anderson kick good	0	7
1					Colts	39-yard field goal by Raul Allegre	3	7
2					Steelers	Louis Lipps 11-yard touchdown reception from Mark Malone, Gary Anderson kick good	3	14
2					Steelers	31-yard field goal by Gary Anderson	3	17
2					Steelers	Rich Erenberg 11-yard touchdown reception from Mark Malone, Gary Anderson kick good	3	24
3					Steelers	John Stallworth 6-yard touchdown reception from Mark Malone, Gary Anderson kick good	3	31
4					Steelers	Mark Malone 1-yard touchdown run, Gary Anderson kick good	3	38
4					Steelers	Louis Lipps 16-yard touchdown reception from Mark Malone, Gary Anderson kick good	3	45
"TOP" = time of possession. For other American football terms, see Glossary of American football.							3	45

=== Week 2: at Cleveland Browns ===
Pittsburgh Steelers at Cleveland Browns

Quarter	1	2	3	4	Total
Steelers	0	0	0	7	7
Browns	0	7	3	7	17

at Cleveland Municipal Stadium, Cleveland, Ohio

- Date: September 16, 1985
- Game time: 9:00 pm EDT
- Game weather: 57 °F (13.9 °C), wind 5 miles per hour (8.0 km/h; 4.3 kn)
- Game attendance: 79,042
- Referee: Gene Barth
- TV announcers (ABC): Frank Gifford (play by play), Joe Namath & O. J. Simpson (color commentators)

Scoring summary

Quarter	Time	Drive			Team	Scoring information	Score	
Quarter	Time	Plays	Yards	TOP	Team	Scoring information	Steelers	Browns
2					Browns	Fred Banks 7-yard touchdown reception from Gary Danielson, Matt Bahr kick good	0	7
3					Browns	18-yard field goal by Matt Bahr	0	10
4					Steelers	John Stallworth 6-yard touchdown reception from Mark Malone, Gary Anderson kick good	7	10
4					Browns	Earnest Byner 21-yard touchdown run, Matt Bahr kick good	7	17
"TOP" = time of possession. For other American football terms, see Glossary of American football.							7	17

=== Week 3: vs. Houston Oilers ===
Houston Oilers at Pittsburgh Steelers

Quarter	1	2	3	4	Total
Oilers	0	0	0	0	0
Steelers	14	3	3	0	20

at Three Rivers Stadium, Pittsburgh, Pennsylvania

- Date: September 22, 1985
- Game time: 1:00 pm EDT
- Game weather: 69 °F (20.6 °C), wind 4 miles per hour (6.4 km/h; 3.5 kn)
- Game attendance: 58,752
- Referee: Ben Dreith
- TV announcers (NBC): Charlie Jones (play by play), Sam Rutigliano (color commentator)

Scoring summary

Quarter	Time	Drive			Team	Scoring information	Score	
Quarter	Time	Plays	Yards	TOP	Team	Scoring information	Oilers	Steelers
1					Steelers	Louis Lipps 25-yard touchdown reception from Mark Malone, Gary Anderson kick good	0	7
1					Steelers	Louis Lipps 5-yard touchdown reception from Mark Malone, Gary Anderson kick good	0	14
2					Steelers	37-yard field goal by Gary Anderson	0	17
3					Steelers	38-yard field goal by Gary Anderson	0	20
"TOP" = time of possession. For other American football terms, see Glossary of American football.							0	20

=== Week 4: vs. Cincinnati Bengals ===
Cincinnati Bengals at Pittsburgh Steelers

Quarter	1	2	3	4	Total
Bengals	0	14	7	16	37
Steelers	0	10	14	0	24

at Three Rivers Stadium, Pittsburgh, Pennsylvania

- Date: September 30, 1985
- Game time: 9:00 pm EDT
- Game weather: 62 °F (16.7 °C), wind 7 miles per hour (11 km/h; 6.1 kn)
- Game attendance: 59,541
- Referee: Pat Haggerty
- TV announcers (ABC): Frank Gifford (play by play), Joe Namath and O. J. Simpson (color commentators)

Scoring summary

Quarter	Time	Drive			Team	Scoring information	Score	
Quarter	Time	Plays	Yards	TOP	Team	Scoring information	Bengals	Steelers
2					Steelers	Louis Lipps 15-yard touchdown reception from Mark Malone, Gary Anderson kick good/no good (blocked)/no good (miss right)/no good (miss left)/no good (miss short)/no good	0	7
2					Bengals	James Brooks 14-yard touchdown run, Jim Breech kick good	7	7
2					Bengals	Rodney Holman 26-yard touchdown reception from Boomer Esiason, Jim Breech kick good	14	7
2					Steelers	29-yard field goal by Gary Anderson	14	10
3					Bengals	Eddie Brown 8-yard touchdown reception from Boomer Esiason, Jim Breech kick good	21	10
3					Steelers	John Stallworth 17-yard touchdown reception from Mark Malone, Gary Anderson kick good	21	17
3					Steelers	Rich Erenberg 4-yard touchdown reception from Mark Malone, Gary Anderson kick good	21	24
4					Bengals	Rodney Holman 4-yard touchdown reception from Boomer Esiason, Jim Breech kick good	28	24
4					Bengals	Jim Breech-yard field goal by 32	31	24
4					Bengals	James Brooks 32-yard touchdown run, 2-point pass failed	37	24
"TOP" = time of possession. For other American football terms, see Glossary of American football.							37	24

=== Week 5: at Miami Dolphins ===
Pittsburgh Steelers at Miami Dolphins

Quarter	1	2	3	4	Total
Steelers	0	17	0	3	20
Dolphins	7	7	3	7	24

at Miami Orange Bowl, Miami, Florida

- Date: October 6, 1985
- Game time: 1:00 pm EDT
- Game weather: 80 °F (26.7 °C), relative humidity 79%, wind 9 miles per hour (14 km/h; 7.8 kn)
- Game attendance: 72,820
- Referee: Dick Jorgensen
- TV announcers (NBC): Marv Albert (play by play), Bob Griese (color commentator)

Scoring summary

Quarter	Time	Drive			Team	Scoring information	Score	
Quarter	Time	Plays	Yards	TOP	Team	Scoring information	Steelers	Dolphins
1					Dolphins	Tony Nathan 1-yard touchdown run, Fuad Reveiz kick good	0	7
2					Steelers	Walter Abercrombie 1-yard touchdown run, Gary Anderson kick good	7	7
2					Steelers	48-yard field goal by Gary Anderson	10	7
2					Dolphins	Dan Johnson 2-yard touchdown reception from Dan Marino, Fuad Reveiz kick good	10	14
2					Steelers	Weegie Thompson 1-yard touchdown reception from Mark Malone, Gary Anderson kick good	17	14
3					Dolphins	35-yard field goal by Fuad Reveiz	17	17
4					Steelers	33-yard field goal by Gary Anderson	20	17
4					Dolphins	Lorenzo Hampton 2-yard touchdown run, Fuad Reveiz kick good	20	24
"TOP" = time of possession. For other American football terms, see Glossary of American football.							20	24

=== Week 6: at Dallas Cowboys ===
Pittsburgh Steelers at Dallas Cowboys

Quarter	1	2	3	4	Total
Steelers	0	3	0	10	13
Cowboys	0	10	10	7	27

at Texas Stadium, Irving, Texas

- Date: October 13, 1985
- Game time: 1:00 pm EDT
- Game weather: 79 °F (26.1 °C), relative humidity 68%, wind 15 miles per hour (24 km/h; 13 kn)
- Game attendance: 62,932
- Referee: Tom Dooley
- TV announcers (NBC): Charlie Jones (play by play), Merlin Olsen (color commentator)

Scoring summary

Quarter	Time	Drive			Team	Scoring information	Score	
Quarter	Time	Plays	Yards	TOP	Team	Scoring information	Steelers	Cowboys
2					Steelers	48-yard field goal by Gary Anderson	3	0
2					Cowboys	Tony Dorsett 56-yard touchdown reception from Danny White, Rafael Septien kick good	3	7
2					Cowboys	38-yard field goal by Rafael Septien	3	10
3					Cowboys	39-yard field goal by Rafael Septien	3	13
3					Cowboys	Interception returned 19 yards for touchdown by Eugene Lockhart, Rafael Septien kick good	3	20
4					Steelers	34-yard field goal by Gary Anderson	6	20
4					Steelers	Walter Abercrombie 1-yard touchdown run, Gary Anderson kick good	13	20
4					Cowboys	Tony Dorsett 35-yard touchdown run, Rafael Septien kick good	13	27
"TOP" = time of possession. For other American football terms, see Glossary of American football.							13	27

=== Week 7: vs. St. Louis Cardinals ===
St. Louis Cardinals at Pittsburgh Steelers

Quarter	1	2	3	4	Total
Cardinals	3	0	0	7	10
Steelers	14	3	6	0	23

at Three Rivers Stadium, Pittsburgh, Pennsylvania

- Date: October 20, 1985
- Game time: 1:00 pm EDT
- Game weather: 56 °F (13.3 °C), wind 10 miles per hour (16 km/h; 8.7 kn)
- Game attendance: 56,478
- Referee: Jim Tunney
- TV announcers (CBS): Tom Brookshier (play by play), Dick Vermiel (color commentator)

Scoring summary

Quarter	Time	Drive			Team	Scoring information	Score	
Quarter	Time	Plays	Yards	TOP	Team	Scoring information	Cardinals	Steelers
1					Cardinals	19-yard field goal by Neil O'Donoghue	3	0
1					Steelers	Louis Lipps 45-yard touchdown reception from Mark Malone, Gary Anderson kick good	3	7
1					Steelers	Frank Pollard 14-yard touchdown run, Gary Anderson kick good	3	14
2					Steelers	33-yard field goal by Gary Anderson	3	17
3					Steelers	33-yard field goal by Gary Anderson	3	20
3					Steelers	33-yard field goal by Gary Anderson	3	23
4					Cardinals	Stump Mitchell 5-yard touchdown reception from Neil Lomax, Neil O'Donoghue kick good	10	23
"TOP" = time of possession. For other American football terms, see Glossary of American football.							10	23

=== Week 8: at Cincinnati Bengals ===
Pittsburgh Steelers at Cincinnati Bengals

Quarter	1	2	3	4	Total
Steelers	0	7	0	14	21
Bengals	3	14	9	0	26

at Riverfront Stadium, Cincinnati

- Date: October 27, 1985
- Game time: 4:00 pm EST
- Game weather: 59 °F (15 °C), wind 4 miles per hour (6.4 km/h; 3.5 kn)
- Game attendance: 55,241
- Referee: Bob McElwee
- TV announcers (NBC): Don Criqui (play by play), Bob Trumpy (color commentator)

Scoring summary

Quarter	Time	Drive			Team	Scoring information	Score	
Quarter	Time	Plays	Yards	TOP	Team	Scoring information	Steelers	Bengals
1					Bengals	37-yard field goal by Jim Breech	0	3
2					Bengals	Rodney Holman 11-yard touchdown reception from Boomer Esiason, Jim Breech kick good	0	10
2					Bengals	Interception returned 57 yards for touchdown by Robert Jackson, Jim Breech kick good	0	17
2					Steelers	Louis Lipps 49-yard touchdown reception from David Woodley, Gary Anderson kick good	7	17
3					Bengals	39-yard field goal by Jim Breech	7	20
3					Bengals	40-yard field goal by Jim Breech	7	23
3					Bengals	32-yard field goal by Jim Breech	7	26
4					Steelers	Louis Lipps 62-yard punt return for touchdown	14	26
4					Steelers	Walter Abercrombie 1-yard touchdown run, Gary Anderson kick good	21	26
"TOP" = time of possession. For other American football terms, see Glossary of American football.							21	26

=== Week 9: vs. Cleveland Browns ===
Cleveland Browns at Pittsburgh Steelers

Quarter	1	2	3	4	Total
Browns	0	6	0	3	9
Steelers	0	0	7	3	10

at Three Rivers Stadium, Pittsburgh, Pennsylvania

- Date: November 3, 1985
- Game time: 1:00 pm EST
- Game weather: 50 °F (10 °C), wind 9 miles per hour (14 km/h; 7.8 kn)
- Game attendance: 51,976
- Referee: Bob Frederic
- TV announcers (NBC): Len Berman (play by play), Reggie Rucker (color commentator)

Scoring summary

Quarter	Time	Drive			Team	Scoring information	Score	
Quarter	Time	Plays	Yards	TOP	Team	Scoring information	Browns	Steelers
2					Browns	34-yard field goal by Matt Bahr	3	0
2					Browns	45-yard field goal by Matt Bahr	6	0
3					Steelers	Walter Abercrombie 32-yard touchdown run, Gary Anderson kick good	6	7
4					Browns	30-yard field goal by Matt Bahr	9	7
4					Steelers	25-yard field goal by Gary Anderson	9	10
"TOP" = time of possession. For other American football terms, see Glossary of American football.							9	10

=== Week 10: at Kansas City Chiefs ===
Pittsburgh Steelers at Kansas City Chiefs

Quarter	1	2	3	4	Total
Steelers	10	17	3	6	36
Chiefs	7	7	0	14	28

at Arrowhead Stadium, Kansas City, Missouri

- Date: November 10, 1985
- Game time: 1:00 pm EST
- Game weather: 36 °F (2.2 °C), wind 13 miles per hour (21 km/h; 11 kn), wind chill 27 °F or −2.8 °C
- Game attendance: 46,126
- Referee: Ben Dreith
- TV announcers (NBC): Marv Albert (play by play), Bob Griese (color commentator)

Scoring summary

Quarter	Time	Drive			Team	Scoring information	Score	
Quarter	Time	Plays	Yards	TOP	Team	Scoring information	Steelers	Chiefs
1					Chiefs	Interception returned 47 yards for touchdown by Deron Cherry, Nick Lowery kick good	0	7
1					Steelers	John Stallworth 13-yard touchdown reception from David Woodley, Gary Anderson kick good	7	7
1					Steelers	35-yard field goal by Gary Anderson	10	7
2					Steelers	31-yard field goal by Gary Anderson	13	7
2					Chiefs	Jeff Smith 45-yard touchdown reception from Bill Kenney, Nick Lowery kick good	13	14
2					Steelers	Louis Lipps 71-yard punt return for touchdown	20	14
2					Steelers	Walter Abercrombie 2-yard touchdown run, Gary Anderson kick good	27	14
3					Steelers	27-yard field goal by Gary Anderson	30	14
4					Chiefs	Jeff Smith 13-yard touchdown reception from Bill Kenney, Nick Lowery kick good	30	21
4					Steelers	36-yard field goal by Gary Anderson	33	21
4					Steelers	28-yard field goal by Gary Anderson	36	21
4					Chiefs	Anthony Hancock 13-yard touchdown reception from Bill Kenney, Nick Lowery kick good	36	28
"TOP" = time of possession. For other American football terms, see Glossary of American football.							36	28

=== Week 11: at Houston Oilers ===
Pittsburgh Steelers at Houston Oilers

Quarter	1	2	3	4	Total
Steelers	3	7	13	7	30
Oilers	0	0	7	0	7

at Astrodome, Houston, Texas

- Date: November 17, 1985
- Game time: 1:00 pm EST
- Game weather: Dome
- Game attendance: 45,977
- Referee: Red Cashion
- TV announcers (NBC): Tom Hammond (play by play), Jimmy Cefalo (color commentator)

Scoring summary

Quarter	Time	Drive			Team	Scoring information	Score	
Quarter	Time	Plays	Yards	TOP	Team	Scoring information	Steelers	Oilers
1					Steelers	52-yard field goal by Gary Anderson	3	0
2					Steelers	Frank Pollard 2-yard touchdown run, Gary Anderson kick good	10	0
3					Oilers	Mike Rozier 15-yard touchdown run, Tony Zendejas kick good	10	7
3					Steelers	31-yard field goal by Gary Anderson	13	7
3					Steelers	David Woodley 1-yard touchdown run, Gary Anderson kick good	20	7
3					Steelers	34-yard field goal by Gary Anderson	23	7
4					Steelers	Walter Abercrombie 5-yard touchdown run, Gary Anderson kick good	30	7
"TOP" = time of possession. For other American football terms, see Glossary of American football.							30	7

=== Week 12: vs. Washington Redskins ===
Washington Redskins at Pittsburgh Steelers

Quarter	1	2	3	4	Total
Redskins	14	6	7	3	30
Steelers	3	14	0	6	23

at Three Rivers Stadium, Pittsburgh, Pennsylvania

- Date: November 24, 1985
- Game time: 1:00 pm EST
- Game weather: 38 °F (3.3 °C), wind 8 miles per hour (13 km/h; 7.0 kn)
- Game attendance: 59,293
- Referee: Gordon McCarter
- TV announcers (CBS): Tim Ryan (play by play), Johnny Morris (color commentator)

Scoring summary

Quarter	Time	Drive			Team	Scoring information	Score	
Quarter	Time	Plays	Yards	TOP	Team	Scoring information	Redskins	Steelers
1					Redskins	George Rogers 1-yard touchdown run, Mark Moseley kick good	7	0
1					Steelers	22-yard field goal by Gary Anderson	7	3
1					Redskins	Clint Didier 18-yard touchdown reception from Jay Schroeder, Mark Moseley kick good	14	3
2					Redskins	20-yard field goal by Mark Moseley	17	3
2					Steelers	Louis Lipps 5-yard touchdown reception from Scott Campbell, Gary Anderson kick good	17	10
2					Steelers	Rich Erenberg 9-yard touchdown reception from Scott Campbell, Gary Anderson kick good	17	17
2					Redskins	39-yard field goal by Mark Moseley	20	17
3					Redskins	John Riggins 1-yard touchdown run, Mark Moseley kick good	27	17
4					Steelers	37-yard field goal by Gary Anderson	27	20
4					Redskins	42-yard field goal by Mark Moseley	30	20
4					Steelers	27-yard field goal by Gary Anderson	30	23
"TOP" = time of possession. For other American football terms, see Glossary of American football.							30	23

=== Week 13: vs. Denver Broncos ===
Denver Broncos at Pittsburgh Steelers

Quarter	1	2	3	4	Total
Broncos	0	10	0	21	31
Steelers	0	6	3	14	23

at Three Rivers Stadium, Pittsburgh, Pennsylvania

- Date: December 1, 1985
- Game time: 1:00 pm EST
- Game weather: 52 °F (11.1 °C), wind 12 miles per hour (19 km/h; 10 kn)
- Game attendance: 56,797
- Referee: Gene Barth
- TV announcers (NBC): Don Criqui (play by play), Bob Trumpy & Paul Zimmerman (color commentators)

Scoring summary

Quarter	Time	Drive			Team	Scoring information	Score	
Quarter	Time	Plays	Yards	TOP	Team	Scoring information	Broncos	Steelers
2					Steelers	25-yard field goal by Gary Anderson	0	3
2					Broncos	Clint Sampson 24-yard touchdown reception from John Elway, Rich Karlis kick good	7	3
2					Broncos	42-yard field goal by Rich Karlis	10	3
2					Steelers	34-yard field goal by Gary Anderson	10	6
3					Steelers	24-yard field goal by Gary Anderson	10	9
4					Broncos	Steve Sewell 12-yard touchdown run, Rich Karlis kick good	17	9
4					Steelers	Louis Lipps 31-yard touchdown reception from David Woodley, Gary Anderson kick good	17	16
4					Steelers	Interception returned 35 yards for touchdown by Mike Merriweather, Gary Anderson kick good	17	23
4					Broncos	Steve Sewell 2-yard touchdown run, Rich Karlis kick good	24	23
4					Broncos	Interception returned 42 yards for touchdown by Mike Harden, Rich Karlis kick good	31	23
"TOP" = time of possession. For other American football terms, see Glossary of American football.							31	23

=== Week 14: at San Diego Chargers ===
Pittsburgh Steelers at San Diego Chargers

Quarter	1	2	3	4	Total
Steelers	7	13	14	10	44
Chargers	21	13	7	13	54

at Jack Murphy Stadium, San Diego, California

- Date: December 8, 1985
- Game time: 9:00 pm EST
- Game weather: 56 °F (13.3 °C), wind 7 miles per hour (11 km/h; 6.1 kn)
- Game attendance: 52,098
- Referee: Jerry Seeman
- TV announcers (ABC): Frank Gifford (play by play), Joe Namath & O. J. Simpson (color commentators)

Scoring summary

Quarter	Time	Drive			Team	Scoring information	Score	
Quarter	Time	Plays	Yards	TOP	Team	Scoring information	Steelers	Chargers
1					Chargers	Tim Spencer 12-yard touchdown run, Robert R. Thomas kick good	0	7
1					Steelers	Walter Abercrombie 15-yard touchdown reception from David Woodley, Gary Anderson kick good	7	7
1					Chargers	Wes Chandler 36-yard touchdown reception from Dan Fouts, Robert R. Thomas kick good	7	14
1					Chargers	Pete Holohan 20-yard touchdown reception from Dan Fouts, Robert R. Thomas kick good	7	21
2					Steelers	Louis Lipps 8-yard touchdown reception from David Woodley, Gary Anderson kick good	14	21
2					Steelers	45-yard field goal by Gary Anderson	17	21
2					Chargers	Wes Chandler 75-yard touchdown reception from Dan Fouts, Robert R. Thomas kick good	17	28
2					Chargers	Buford McGee 3-yard touchdown run, Robert R. Thomas kick no good	17	34
2					Steelers	41-yard field goal by Gary Anderson	20	34
3					Steelers	David Woodley 1-yard touchdown run, Gary Anderson kick good	27	34
3					Steelers	Walter Abercrombie 25-yard touchdown reception from David Woodley, Gary Anderson kick good	34	34
3					Chargers	Buford McGee 7-yard touchdown run, Robert R. Thomas kick good	34	41
4					Steelers	Louis Lipps 15-yard touchdown run, Gary Anderson kick good	41	41
4					Steelers	Gary Anderson-yard field goal by 26	44	41
4					Chargers	Gary Anderson (Chargers) 2-yard touchdown run, Robert R. Thomas kick no good	44	47
4					Chargers	Interception returned 47 yards for touchdown by Jeffery Dale, Robert R. Thomas kick good	44	54
"TOP" = time of possession. For other American football terms, see Glossary of American football.							44	54

=== Week 15: vs. Buffalo Bills ===
Buffalo Bills at Pittsburgh Steelers

Quarter	1	2	3	4	Total
Bills	7	14	0	3	24
Steelers	0	14	6	10	30

at Three Rivers Stadium, Pittsburgh, Pennsylvania

- Date: December 15, 1985
- Game time: 1:00 pm EST
- Game weather: 17 °F (−8.3 °C), wind 14 miles per hour (23 km/h; 12 kn), wind chill 3 °F or −16.1 °C
- Game attendance: 35,953
- Referee: Pat Haggerty
- TV announcers (NBC): Phil Stone (play by play), Sam Rutigliano (color commentator)

Scoring summary

Quarter	Time	Drive			Team	Scoring information	Score	
Quarter	Time	Plays	Yards	TOP	Team	Scoring information	Bills	Steelers
1					Bills	Greg Bell 77-yard touchdown run, Scott Norwood kick good	7	0
2					Bills	Jerry Butler 33-yard touchdown reception from Bruce Mathison, Scott Norwood kick good	14	0
2					Bills	Fumble recovery returned 61 yards for touchdown by Don Wilson, Scott Norwood kick good	21	0
2					Steelers	Louis Lipps 13-yard touchdown reception from Scott Campbell, Gary Anderson kick good	21	7
2					Steelers	Frank Pollard 4-yard touchdown run, Gary Anderson kick good	21	14
3					Steelers	26-yard field goal by Gary Anderson	21	17
3					Steelers	31-yard field goal by Gary Anderson	21	20
4					Bills	24-yard field goal by Scott Norwood	24	20
4					Steelers	45-yard field goal by Gary Anderson	24	23
4					Steelers	Walter Abercrombie 2-yard touchdown run, Gary Anderson kick good	24	30
"TOP" = time of possession. For other American football terms, see Glossary of American football.							24	30

=== Week 16: at New York Giants ===
Pittsburgh Steelers at New York Giants

Quarter	1	2	3	4	Total
Steelers	0	3	7	0	10
Giants	7	21	0	0	28

at Giants Stadium, East Rutherford, New Jersey

- Date: December 21, 1985
- Game time: 12:30 pm EST
- Game weather: 27 °F (−2.8 °C), wind 15 miles per hour (24 km/h; 13 kn), wind chill 15 °F or −9.4 °C
- Game attendance: 66,785
- Referee: Jerry Markbreit
- TV announcers (NBC): Dick Enberg (play by play), Merlin Olsen (color commentator)

Scoring summary

Quarter	Time	Drive			Team	Scoring information	Score	
Quarter	Time	Plays	Yards	TOP	Team	Scoring information	Steelers	Giants
1					Giants	Joe Morris 9-yard touchdown run, Eric Schubert kick good	0	7
2					Steelers	26-yard field goal by Gary Anderson	3	7
2					Giants	Joe Morris 65-yard touchdown run, Eric Schubert kick good	3	14
2					Giants	Joe Morris 1-yard touchdown run, Eric Schubert kick good	3	21
2					Giants	Bobby Johnson 23-yard touchdown reception from Phil Simms, Eric Schubert kick good	3	28
3					Steelers	John Stallworth 34-yard touchdown reception from Scott Campbell, Gary Anderson kick good	10	28
"TOP" = time of possession. For other American football terms, see Glossary of American football.							10	28

== Standings ==
AFC Central
	W	L	T	PCT	DIV	CONF	PF	PA	STK
Cleveland Browns^{(3)}	8	8	0	.500	4–2	7–5	287	294	L1
Cincinnati Bengals	7	9	0	.438	4–2	5–7	441	437	L2
Pittsburgh Steelers	7	9	0	.438	3–3	6–6	379	355	L1
Houston Oilers	5	11	0	.313	1–5	4–8	284	412	L4
