= 1986 Pittsburgh Steelers season =

Pittsburgh Steelers 54th US football season

- Owner: Art Rooney
- General manager: Dick Haley
- Head coach: Chuck Noll
- Home stadium: Three Rivers Stadium

Results
- Record: 6–10
- Division place: 3rd AFC Central
- Playoffs: Did not qualify
- All-Pros: None
- Pro Bowlers: RB Earnest Jackson; LB Mike Merriweather
- Team MVP: Bryan Hinkle
- Team ROY: Anthony Henton

The 1986 Pittsburgh Steelers season was the franchise’s 54th season as a professional sports franchise and as a member of the National Football League. The Steelers failed to improve upon their 7–9 record from 1985: they instead finished 6–10 and failed to reach the playoffs for a second consecutive season.

== Offseason ==
=== NFL draft ===
1986 Pittsburgh Steelers draft
Round	Pick	Player	Position	College	Notes
1	9	John Rienstra	Guard	Temple	
2	36	Gerald Williams	Guard	Auburn	
3	67	Bubby Brister	Quarterback	Northeast Louisiana	
4	94	Bill Callahan	Safety	Pittsburgh	
5	122	Erroll Tucker	Cornerback	Utah	
5	135	Brent Jones *	Tight end	Santa Clara	
6	148	Domingo Bryant	Safety	Texas A&M	
7	175	Rodney Carter	Running back	Purdue	
8	207	Cap Boso	Tight end	Illinois	
9	234	Anthony Henton	Linebacker	Troy State	
10	260	Warren Seitz	Wide receiver	Missouri	
11	287	Larry Station	Linebacker	Iowa	
12	314	Mike Williams	Linebacker	Tulsa	
Made roster * Made at least one Pro Bowl during career

=== Undrafted free agents ===
1986 undrafted free agents of note
Player	Position	College
Andrew Baker	Wide receiver	Rutgers
Gary Barber	Linebacker	Youngstown State
Brian Blankenship	Guard	Nebraska
Eric Wycoff	Running back	Illinois

== Personnel ==
=== Staff ===
1986 Pittsburgh Steelers staff
Front office: Chairman of the board – Arthur J. Rooney; President – Daniel M. Rooney; Vice president – John R. McGinley; Vice president – Arthur J. Rooney, Jr.; Controller – Dennis P. Thimons; Assistant controller-management – Dan Ferens; Traveling secretary – James A. Boston; Publicity director – Joe Gordon; Assistant publicity director – Dan Edwards; Director of ticket sales – Geraldine Glenn; Assistant controller-tickets – Jim Ellenberger; Director of player personnel – Dick Haley; Assistant director of player personnel – William Nunn, Jr.; Pro talent scout – Tom Modrak; Talent scout – West Coast – Bob Schmitz; College talent scout – Joe Krupa; Talent scout – East – Tom Donahoe; Talent scout – Midwest – Jesse Kaye; Head coaches: Head coach – Chuck Noll; Offensive coaches: Offensive coordinator – Tom Moore; Offensive line: tackles/tight ends – Ron Blackledge; Offensive backfield – Dick Hoak; Offensive line: centers/guards – Hal Hunter	Defensive coaches: Defensive coordinator – Tony Dungy; Inside linebackers – Dennis Fitzgerald; Outside linebackers – Jed Hughes; Defensive line – Jon Kolb; Strength and conditioning: Conditioning & training coach – Walt Evans; Dentist – Dr. George P. Boucek; Ophthalmologist – Dr. Phillip Buzzelli; Physician, orthopedic – Dr. Thomas W. Cowan; Physician, M.D. – Dr. David S. Huber; Neurological surgery consultant – Dr. Joseph C. Maroon; Physician, M.D. – Dr. Richard Rydze; Physician, consultant – Dr. Abraham J.Twerski; Physician, M.D. – Dr. Anthony P. Yates; Trainer – Ralph Berlin; Trainer – Fran Feld; Equipment manager – Anthony Parisi; Field manager – Rodgers Freyvogel; Video & film director – Bob McCartney; Photographers – Mike Fabus, Bill Amatucci

=== Roster ===
1986 Pittsburgh Steelers roster
Quarterbacks (QB): 6 Bubby Brister; 16 Mark Malone; Running backs (RB): 34 Walter Abercrombie; 24 Rich Erenberg; 43 Earnest Jackson; 40 Dan Reeder; 45 Chuck Sanders; Wide receivers (WR): 83 Louis Lipps; 82 John Stallworth; 85 Calvin Sweeney; 87 Weegie Thompson; Tight ends (TE): 86 Preston Gothard; 80 Warren Seitz	Offensive linemen (OL): 66 Mark Behning T; 62 Tunch Ilkin T; 74 Terry Long G; 65 Ray Pinney T; 63 Pete Rostosky T/G; 51 Dan Turk C; 52 Mike Webster C; 73 Craig Wolfley G; Defensive linemen (DL): 67 Gary Dunn NT; 92 Keith Gary DE; 64 Edmund Nelson DE; 99 Darryl Sims DE; 98 Gerald Williams NT; 93 Keith Willis DE	Linebackers (LB): 91 Gregg Carr ILB; 56 Robin Cole ILB; 96 Anthony Henton OLB; 53 Bryan Hinkle OLB; 50 David Little ILB; 57 Mike Merriweather OLB; 90 Larry Station OLB; 55 Dennis Winston ILB; Defensive backs (DB): 33 Harvey Clayton CB; 42 Dave Edwards SS; 28 Lupe Sanchez CB; 41 Chris Sheffield CB; 31 Donnie Shell SS; 26 John Swain CB; 21 Eric Williams FS; 22 Rick Woods FS; Special teams (ST): 1 Gary Anderson K; 18 Harry Newsome P	Reserve: 88 Jessie Britt WR (IR); 35 Gordon Brown RB (IR); 44 Rodney Carter RB (IR); 38 Donald Herron CB (IR); 36 David Hughes RB (IR); 84 Glenn McCombs TE (IR); 30 Frank Pollard RB (IR); 76 Jerry Quick T (IR); 60 Randy Rasmussen G/C (IR); 79 John Rienstra G (IR); 20 Erroll Tucker CB (IR); 79 Hans Wiederkehr G (IR); 49 Dwayne Woodruff CB (IR); Rookies in italics

== Preseason ==
=== Schedule ===
Week	Date	Opponent	Game site	Kickoff (ET)	TV	Result	Record
1	Saturday, August 9	Chicago Bears	Three Rivers Stadium	7:00 p.m.	WTAE	L 23–13	0–1
2	Friday, August 15	at Washington Redskins	RFK Stadium	8:00 p.m.	WTAE	L 27–24 (OT)	0–2
3	Friday, August 22	at Dallas Cowboys	Texas Stadium	9:00 p.m.	WTAE	W 41–28	1–2
4	Saturday, August 30	at New York Giants	Giants Stadium	8:00 p.m.	WTAE	L 17–3	1–3

== Regular season ==
=== Schedule ===
Week	Date	Opponent	Game site	Kickoff (ET)	TV	Result	Record
1	Sunday, September 7	at Seattle Seahawks	Kingdome	4:00 p.m.	NBC	L 30–0	0–1
2	Monday, September 15	Denver Broncos	Three Rivers Stadium	9:00 p.m.	ABC	L 21–10	0–2
3	Sunday, September 21	at Minnesota Vikings	Hubert H. Humphrey Metrodome	1:00 p.m.	NBC	L 31–7	0–3
4	Sunday, September 28	at Houston Oilers	Astrodome	1:00 p.m.	NBC	W 22–16 (OT)	1–3
5	Sunday, October 5	Cleveland Browns	Three Rivers Stadium	1:00 p.m.	NBC	L 27–24	1–4
6	Monday, October 13	at Cincinnati Bengals	Riverfront Stadium	9:00 p.m.	ABC	L 24–22	1–5
7	Sunday, October 19	New England Patriots	Three Rivers Stadium	1:00 p.m.	NBC	L 34–0	1–6
8	Sunday, October 26	Cincinnati Bengals	Three Rivers Stadium	1:00 p.m.	NBC	W 30–9	2–6
9	Sunday, November 2	Green Bay Packers	Three Rivers Stadium	1:00 p.m.	CBS	W 27–3	3–6
10	Sunday, November 9	at Buffalo Bills	Rich Stadium	1:00 p.m.	NBC	L 16–12	3–7
11	Sunday, November 16	Houston Oilers	Three Rivers Stadium	1:00 p.m.	NBC	W 21–10	4–7
12	Sunday, November 23	at Cleveland Browns	Cleveland Municipal Stadium	1:00 p.m.	NBC	L 37–31 (OT)	4–8
13	Sunday, November 30	at Chicago Bears	Soldier Field	1:00 p.m.	NBC	L 13–10 (OT)	4–9
14	Sunday, December 7	Detroit Lions	Three Rivers Stadium	1:00 p.m.	CBS	W 27–17	5–9
15	Saturday, December 13	at New York Jets	Giants Stadium	12:30 p.m.	NBC	W 45–24	6–9
16	Sunday, December 21	Kansas City Chiefs	Three Rivers Stadium	1:00 p.m.	NBC	L 24–19	6–10

=== Week 1: at Seattle Seahawks ===
Pittsburgh Steelers at Seattle Seahawks

Quarter	1	2	3	4	Total
Steelers	0	0	0	0	0
Seahawks	0	6	10	14	30

at Kingdome, Seattle, Washington

- Date: September 7, 1986
- Game time: 4:00 PM EDT
- Game weather: Dome
- Game attendance: 61,461
- Referee: Jerry Seeman
- TV announcers (NBC): Tom Hammond (play by play), Dave Rowe (color commentator)

Scoring summary

Quarter	Time	Drive			Team	Scoring information	Score	
Quarter	Time	Plays	Yards	TOP	Team	Scoring information	Steelers	Seahawks
2					Seahawks	Daryl Turner 4-yard touchdown reception from Dave Krieg, Norm Johnson kick no good	0	6
3					Seahawks	Interception returned 18 yards for touchdown by Dave Brown, Norm Johnson kick good	0	13
3					Seahawks	24-yard field goal by Norm Johnson	0	16
4					Seahawks	Steve Largent 10-yard touchdown reception from Dave Krieg, Norm Johnson kick good	0	23
4					Seahawks	Randall Morris 49-yard touchdown run, Norm Johnson kick good	0	30
"TOP" = time of possession. For other American football terms, see Glossary of American football.							0	30

=== Week 2 vs. Denver Broncos ===
Denver Broncos at Pittsburgh Steelers

Quarter	1	2	3	4	Total
Broncos	0	7	7	7	21
Steelers	0	0	3	7	10

at Three Rivers Stadium, Pittsburgh, Pennsylvania

- Date: September 15, 1986
- Game time: 9:00 PM EDT
- Game weather: 64 °F (17.8 °C), wind 7 miles per hour (11 km/h; 6.1 kn)
- Game attendance: 57,305
- Referee: Bob McElwee
- TV announcers (ABC): Al Michaels (play by play), Frank Gifford (color commentator)

Scoring summary

Quarter	Time	Drive			Team	Scoring information	Score	
Quarter	Time	Plays	Yards	TOP	Team	Scoring information	Broncos	Steelers
2					Broncos	Steve Watson 21-yard touchdown reception from John Elway, Rich Karlis kick good	7	0
3					Steelers	42-yard field goal by Gary Anderson	7	3
3					Broncos	Steve Sewell 34-yard touchdown reception from John Elway, Rich Karlis kick good	14	3
4					Steelers	Rich Erenberg 7-yard touchdown run, Gary Anderson kick good	14	10
4					Broncos	Sammy Winder 13-yard touchdown reception from John Elway, Rich Karlis kick good	21	10
"TOP" = time of possession. For other American football terms, see Glossary of American football.							21	10

=== Week 3: at Minnesota Vikings ===
Pittsburgh Steelers at Minnesota Vikings

Quarter	1	2	3	4	Total
Steelers	7	0	0	0	7
Vikings	14	3	7	7	31

at Hubert H. Humphrey Metrodome, Minneapolis, Minnesota

- Date: September 21, 1986
- Game time: 1:00 PM EDT
- Game weather: Dome
- Game attendance: 56,795
- Referee: Ben Dreith
- TV announcers (NBC): Don Criqui (play by play), Bob Trumpy (color commentator)

Scoring summary

Quarter	Time	Drive			Team	Scoring information	Score	
Quarter	Time	Plays	Yards	TOP	Team	Scoring information	Steelers	Vikings
1					Vikings	Hassan Jones 55-yard touchdown reception from Tommy Kramer, Chuck Nelson kick good	0	7
1					Steelers	Walter Abercrombie 18-yard touchdown reception from Mark Malone, Gary Anderson kick good	7	7
1					Vikings	Hassan Jones 16-yard touchdown reception from Tommy Kramer, Chuck Nelson kick good	7	14
2					Vikings	48-yard field goal by Chuck Nelson	7	17
3					Vikings	Allen Rice 12-yard touchdown run, Chuck Nelson kick good	7	24
4					Vikings	Jim Gustafson 9-yard touchdown reception from Tommy Kramer, Chuck Nelson kick good	7	31
"TOP" = time of possession. For other American football terms, see Glossary of American football.							7	31

=== Week 4: at Houston Oilers ===
Pittsburgh Steelers at Houston Oilers

Quarter	1	2	3	4	OT	Total
Steelers	0	3	10	3	6	22
Oilers	3	7	0	6	0	16

at Astrodome, Houston, Texas

- Date: September 28, 1986
- Game time: 1:00 PM EDT
- Game weather: Dome
- Game attendance: 42,001
- Referee: Gordon McCarter
- TV announcers (NBC): Tom Hammond (play by play), Sam Rutigliano (color commentator)

Scoring summary

Quarter	Time	Drive			Team	Scoring information	Score	
Quarter	Time	Plays	Yards	TOP	Team	Scoring information	Steelers	Oilers
1					Oilers	45-yard field goal by Tony Zendejas	0	3
2					Steelers	42-yard field goal by Gary Anderson	3	3
2					Oilers	Ernest Givins 35-yard touchdown reception from Warren Moon, Tony Zendejas kick good	3	10
3					Steelers	Calvin Sweeney 19-yard touchdown reception from Mark Malone, Gary Anderson kick good	10	10
3					Steelers	45-yard field goal by Gary Anderson	13	10
4					Oilers	29-yard field goal by Tony Zendejas	13	13
4					Oilers	28-yard field goal by Tony Zendejas	13	16
4					Steelers	23-yard field goal by Gary Anderson	16	16
5					Steelers	Walter Abercrombie 3-yard touchdown run, 2-point {{{2pt type}}} {{{2pt result}}}	16	22
"TOP" = time of possession. For other American football terms, see Glossary of American football.							22	16

=== Week 5: vs. Cleveland Browns ===
Cleveland Browns at Pittsburgh Steelers

Quarter	1	2	3	4	Total
Browns	10	7	3	7	27
Steelers	0	14	7	3	24

at Three Rivers Stadium, Pittsburgh, Pennsylvania

- Date: October 5, 1986
- Game time: 1:00 PM EDT
- Game weather: 61 °F (16.1 °C), wind 17 miles per hour (27 km/h; 15 kn)
- Game attendance: 57,327
- Referee: Dick Jorgensen
- TV announcers: Charlie Jones (play by play), Jimmy Cefalo (color commentator)

Scoring summary

Quarter	Time	Drive			Team	Scoring information	Score	
Quarter	Time	Plays	Yards	TOP	Team	Scoring information	Browns	Steelers
1					Browns	Webster Slaughter 15-yard touchdown reception from Bernie Kosar, Matt Bahr kick good	7	0
1					Browns	22-yard field goal by Matt Bahr	10	0
2					Steelers	Mark Malone 1-yard touchdown run, Gary Anderson kick good	10	7
2					Steelers	Rich Erenberg 5-yard touchdown reception from Mark Malone, Gary Anderson kick good	10	14
2					Browns	Gerald McNeil 100-yard kickoff return for touchdown	17	14
3					Steelers	Louis Lipps 6-yard touchdown reception from Mark Malone, Gary Anderson kick good	17	20
3					Browns	39-yard field goal by Matt Bahr	20	20
4					Steelers	45-yard field goal by Gary Anderson	20	23
4					Browns	Earnest Byner 4-yard touchdown run, Matt Bahr kick good	27	23
"TOP" = time of possession. For other American football terms, see Glossary of American football.							27	23

This was Cleveland’s first win in Pittsburgh since 1969.

=== Week 6: at Cincinnati Bengals ===
Pittsburgh Steelers at Cincinnati Bengals

Quarter	1	2	3	4	Total
Steelers	7	2	10	3	22
Bengals	7	7	0	10	24

at Riverfront Stadium, Cincinnati, Ohio

- Date: October 13, 1986
- Game time: 9:00 PM EDT
- Game weather: 59 °F (15 °C), wind 10 miles per hour (16 km/h; 8.7 kn)
- Game attendance: 54,283
- Referee: Bob Frederic
- TV announcers (ABC): Frank Gifford (play by play), Lynn Swann (color commentator)

Scoring summary

Quarter	Time	Drive			Team	Scoring information	Score	
Quarter	Time	Plays	Yards	TOP	Team	Scoring information	Steelers	Bengals
1					Bengals	Rodney Holman 32-yard touchdown reception from Boomer Esiason, Jim Breech kick good	0	7
1					Steelers	Bubby Brister 1-yard touchdown run, Gary Anderson kick good	7	7
2					Bengals	Tim McGee 7-yard touchdown reception from Boomer Esiason, Jim Breech kick good	7	14
2					Steelers	Jeff Hayes forced out of end zone	9	14
3					Steelers	Earnest Jackson 1-yard touchdown run, Gary Anderson kick good	16	14
3					Steelers	24-yard field goal by Gary Anderson	19	14
4					Bengals	Jeff Hayes 61-yard run for touchdown off fake punt	19	21
4					Bengals	40-yard field goal by Jim Breech	19	24
4					Bengals	44-yard field goal by Gary Anderson	22	24
"TOP" = time of possession. For other American football terms, see Glossary of American football.							22	24

=== Week 7: vs. New England Patriots ===
New England Patriots at Pittsburgh Steelers

Quarter	1	2	3	4	Total
Patriots	10	14	7	3	34
Steelers	0	0	0	0	0

at Three Rivers Stadium, Pittsburgh, Pennsylvania

- Date: October 19, 1986
- Game time: 1:00 PM EDT
- Game weather: 43 °F (6.1 °C), wind 4 miles per hour (6.4 km/h; 3.5 kn)
- Game attendance: 54,743
- Referee: Pat Haggerty
- TV announcers (NBC): Don Criqui (play by play), Bob Trumpy (color commentator)

Scoring summary

Quarter	Time	Drive			Team	Scoring information	Score	
Quarter	Time	Plays	Yards	TOP	Team	Scoring information	Patriots	Steelers
1					Patriots	31-yard field goal by Tony Franklin	3	0
1					Patriots	Stephen Starring 43-yard touchdown reception from Steve Grogan, Tony Franklin kick good	10	0
2					Patriots	Interception returned 37 yards for touchdown by Fred Marion, Tony Franklin kick good	17	0
2					Patriots	Tony Collins 10-yard touchdown reception from Steve Grogan, Tony Franklin kick good	24	0
3					Patriots	Willie Scott 2-yard touchdown reception from Steve Grogan, Tony Franklin kick good	31	0
4					Patriots	36-yard field goal by Tony Franklin	34	0
"TOP" = time of possession. For other American football terms, see Glossary of American football.							34	0

=== Week 8: vs. Cincinnati Bengals ===
Cincinnati Bengals at Pittsburgh Steelers

Quarter	1	2	3	4	Total
Bengals	0	3	3	3	9
Steelers	3	14	6	7	30

at Three Rivers Stadium, Pittsburgh, Pennsylvania

- Date: October 26, 1986
- Game time: 1:00 PM EST
- Game weather: 55 °F (12.8 °C), wind 8 miles per hour (13 km/h; 7.0 kn)
- Game attendance: 50,815
- Referee: Jim Tunney
- TV announcers (NBC): Tom Hammond (play by play), Reggie Rucker (color commentator)

Scoring summary

Quarter	Time	Drive			Team	Scoring information	Score	
Quarter	Time	Plays	Yards	TOP	Team	Scoring information	Bengals	Steelers
1					Steelers	31-yard field goal by Gary Anderson	0	3
2					Steelers	Rich Erenberg 10-yard touchdown reception from Mark Malone, Gary Anderson kick good	0	10
2					Bengals	19-yard field goal by Jim Breech	3	10
2					Steelers	Weegie Thompson 9-yard touchdown reception from Mark Malone, Gary Anderson kick good	3	17
3					Steelers	43-yard field goal by Gary Anderson	3	20
3					Steelers	41-yard field goal by Gary Anderson	3	23
3					Bengals	40-yard field goal by Jim Breech	6	23
4					Steelers	Earnest Jackson 1-yard touchdown run, Gary Anderson kick good	6	30
4					Bengals	31-yard field goal by Jim Breech	9	30
"TOP" = time of possession. For other American football terms, see Glossary of American football.							9	30

=== Week 9: vs. Green Bay Packers ===
Green Bay Packers at Pittsburgh Steelers

Quarter	1	2	3	4	Total
Packers	0	3	0	0	3
Steelers	10	3	7	7	27

at Three Rivers Stadium, Pittsburgh, Pennsylvania

- Date: November 2, 1986
- Game time: 1:00 PM EST
- Game weather: 52 °F (11.1 °C), wind 9 miles per hour (14 km/h; 7.8 kn)
- Game attendance: 52,831
- Referee: Chuck Heberling
- TV announcers (CBS): Jim Hill (play by play), Johnny Morris (color commentator)

Scoring summary

Quarter	Time	Drive			Team	Scoring information	Score	
Quarter	Time	Plays	Yards	TOP	Team	Scoring information	Packers	Steelers
1					Steelers	25-yard field goal by Gary Anderson	0	3
1					Steelers	Weegie Thompson 18-yard touchdown reception from Mark Malone, Gary Anderson kick good	0	10
2					Steelers	40-yard field goal by Gary Anderson	0	13
2					Packers	34-yard field goal by Al Del Greco	3	13
3					Steelers	Weegie Thompson 9-yard touchdown reception from Mark Malone, Gary Anderson kick good	3	20
4					Steelers	Weegie Thompson 6-yard touchdown reception from Mark Malone, Gary Anderson kick good	3	27
"TOP" = time of possession. For other American football terms, see Glossary of American football.							3	27

=== Week 10: at Buffalo Bills ===
Pittsburgh Steelers at Buffalo Bills

Quarter	1	2	3	4	Total
Steelers	0	0	12	0	12
Bills	6	7	0	3	16

at Rich Stadium, Orchard Park, New York

- Date: November 9, 1986
- Game time: 1:00 PM EST
- Game weather: 55 °F (12.8 °C), wind 27 miles per hour (43 km/h; 23 kn)
- Game attendance: 72,000
- Referee: Gordon McCarter
- TV announcers (NBC): Jay Randolph (play by play), Reggie Rucker (color commentator)

Scoring summary

Quarter	Time	Drive			Team	Scoring information	Score	
Quarter	Time	Plays	Yards	TOP	Team	Scoring information	Steelers	Bills
1					Bills	Andre Reed 3-yard touchdown reception from Jim Kelly, Scott Norwood kick no good	0	6
2					Bills	Rob Riddick 5-yard touchdown run, Scott Norwood kick good	0	13
3					Steelers	Earnest Jackson 5-yard touchdown run, Gary Anderson kick no good	6	13
3					Steelers	Weegie Thompson 11-yard touchdown reception from Mark Malone, Gary Anderson kick no good	12	13
4					Bills	29-yard field goal by Scott Norwood	12	16
"TOP" = time of possession. For other American football terms, see Glossary of American football.							12	16

=== Week 11: vs. Houston Oilers ===
Houston Oilers at Pittsburgh Steelers

Quarter	1	2	3	4	Total
Oilers	7	3	0	0	10
Steelers	14	7	0	0	21

at Three Rivers Stadium, Pittsburgh, Pennsylvania

- Date: November 16, 1986
- Game time: 1:00 PM EST
- Game weather: 39 °F (3.9 °C), wind 9 miles per hour (14 km/h; 7.8 kn)
- Game attendance: 49,724
- Referee: Red Cashion
- TV announcers (NBC): Tom Hammond (play by play), Reggie Rucker (color commentator)

Scoring summary

Quarter	Time	Drive			Team	Scoring information	Score	
Quarter	Time	Plays	Yards	TOP	Team	Scoring information	Oilers	Steelers
1					Steelers	Walter Abercrombie 8-yard touchdown run, Gary Anderson kick good	0	7
1					Oilers	Ernest Givins 33-yard touchdown reception from Warren Moon, Tony Zendejas kick good	7	7
1					Steelers	Earnest Jackson 3-yard touchdown run, Gary Anderson kick good	7	14
2					Steelers	Rich Erenberg 17-yard touchdown reception from Mark Malone, Gary Anderson kick good	7	21
2					Oilers	44-yard field goal by Tony Zendejas	10	21
"TOP" = time of possession. For other American football terms, see Glossary of American football.							10	21

=== Week 12: at Cleveland Browns ===
Pittsburgh Steelers at Cleveland Browns

Quarter	1	2	3	4	OT	Total
Steelers	7	7	7	10	0	31
Browns	0	21	7	3	6	37

at Cleveland Municipal Stadium, Cleveland, Ohio

- Date: November 23, 1986
- Game time: 1:00 PM EST
- Game weather: 40 °F (4.4 °C), wind 13 miles per hour (21 km/h; 11 kn)
- Game attendance: 76,452
- Referee: Pat Haggerty
- TV announcers (NBC): Don Criqui (play by play), Bob Trumpy (color commentator)

Scoring summary

Quarter	Time	Drive			Team	Scoring information	Score	
Quarter	Time	Plays	Yards	TOP	Team	Scoring information	Steelers	Browns
1					Steelers	Walter Abercrombie 1-yard touchdown run, Gary Anderson kick good	7	0
2					Browns	Curtis Dickey 2-yard touchdown run, Matt Bahr kick good	7	7
2					Browns	Kevin Mack 1-yard touchdown run, Matt Bahr kick good	7	14
2					Steelers	Walter Abercrombie 38-yard touchdown run, Gary Anderson kick good	14	14
2					Browns	Ozzie Newsome 20-yard touchdown reception from Bernie Kosar, Matt Bahr kick good	14	21
3					Steelers	Mark Malone 1-yard touchdown run, Gary Anderson kick good	21	21
3					Browns	Curtis Dickey 4-yard touchdown run, Matt Bahr kick good	21	28
4					Steelers	Mark Malone 1-yard touchdown run, Gary Anderson kick good	28	28
4					Browns	25-yard field goal by Matt Bahr	28	31
4					Browns	40-yard field goal by Gary Anderson	31	31
OT					Browns	Webster Slaughter 36-yard touchdown reception from Bernie Kosar, kick good	31	37
"TOP" = time of possession. For other American football terms, see Glossary of American football.							31	37

=== Week 13: at Chicago Bears ===
Pittsburgh Steelers at Chicago Bears

Quarter	1	2	3	4	OT	Total
Steelers	0	3	7	0	0	10
Bears	3	0	0	7	3	13

at Soldier Field, Chicago, Illinois

- Date: November 30, 1986
- Game time: 1:00 PM EST
- Game weather: 40 °F (4.4 °C), wind 19 miles per hour (31 km/h; 17 kn)
- Game attendance: 61,425
- Referee: Jerry Seeman
- TV announcers (NBC): Charlie Jones (play by play), Jimmy Cefalo (color commentator)

Scoring summary

Quarter	Time	Drive			Team	Scoring information	Score	
Quarter	Time	Plays	Yards	TOP	Team	Scoring information	Steelers	Bears
1					Bears	39-yard field goal by Kevin Butler	0	3
2					Steelers	30-yard field goal by Gary Anderson	3	3
3					Steelers	Preston Gothard 12-yard touchdown reception from Harry Newsome, Gary Anderson kick good	10	3
4					Bears	Walter Payton 3-yard touchdown run, Kevin Butler kick good	10	10
OT					Bears	42-yard field goal by Kevin Butler	10	13
"TOP" = time of possession. For other American football terms, see Glossary of American football.							10	13

=== Week 14: vs. Detroit Lions ===
Detroit Lions at Pittsburgh Steelers

Quarter	1	2	3	4	Total
Lions	0	10	7	0	17
Steelers	3	7	14	3	27

at Three Rivers Stadium, Pittsburgh, Pennsylvania''

- Date: December 7, 1986
- Game time: 1:00 PM EST
- Game weather: 40 °F (4.4 °C), wind 9 miles per hour (14 km/h; 7.8 kn)
- Game attendance: 45,042
- Referee: Bob Frederic
- TV announcers (CBS): Verne Lundquist (play by play), Dick Vermeil (color commentator)

Scoring summary

Quarter	Time	Drive			Team	Scoring information	Score	
Quarter	Time	Plays	Yards	TOP	Team	Scoring information	Lions	Steelers
1					Steelers	26-yard field goal by Gary Anderson	0	3
2					Steelers	Louis Lipps 12-yard touchdown reception from Mark Malone, Gary Anderson kick good	0	10
2					Lions	Garry James 60-yard touchdown run, Eddie Murray kick good	7	10
2					Lions	30-yard field goal by Eddie Murray	10	10
3					Lions	Jeff Chadwick 1-yard touchdown reception from Joe Ferguson, Eddie Murray kick good	17	10
3					Steelers	Earnest Jackson 1-yard touchdown run, Gary Anderson kick good	17	17
3					Steelers	Louis Lipps 39-yard touchdown reception from Mark Malone, Gary Anderson kick good	17	24
4					Steelers	28-yard field goal by Gary Anderson	17	27
"TOP" = time of possession. For other American football terms, see Glossary of American football.							17	27

=== Week 15 at Jets ===
Week Fifteen: Pittsburgh Steelers (5–9) at New York Jets (10–4)

Quarter	1	2	3	4	Total
Steelers	0	17	0	28	45
Jets	0	14	3	7	24

at Giants Stadium, East Rutherford, New Jersey

- Date: December 13, 1986
- Game time: 12:30 PM EST
- Game weather: Clear, 32 °F (0 °C)
- Game attendance: 58,044
- Referee: Dick Hantak
- TV announcers (NBC): Dick Enberg & Merlin Olsen
- Pro-Football-Reference.com, The Football Database

Game information

First quarter no scoring Second quarter

- PIT – Walter Abercrombie 1-yard run (Gary Anderson kick), 12:10. Steelers 7–0. Drive:
- NYJ – Jo-Jo Townsell 93-yard kickoff return (Pat Leahy kick), 11:54. Tie 7–7.
- PIT – Gary Anderson 36-yard field goal, 9:07. Steelers 10–7. Drive:
- PIT – Walter Abercrombie 7-yard pass from Mark Malone (Gary Anderson kick), 1:54. Steelers 17—7. Drive:
- NYJ – Kurt Sohn 24-yard pass from Ken O'Brien (Pat Leahy kick), 0:14. Steelers 17–14. Drive:

Third quarter

- NYJ – Pat Leahy 18-yard field goal, 9:04. Tie 17–17. Drive:

Fourth quarter

- PIT – Mark Malone 1-yard run (Gary Anderson kick), 11:11. Steelers 24–17. Drive:
- PIT – John Stallworth 40-yard pass from Mark Malone (Gary Anderson kick), 7:48. Steelers 31–17. Drive:
- PIT – Lupe Sanchez 67-yard interception return (Gary Anderson kick), 6:00. Steelers 38–17.
- NYJ – Mickey Shuler 5-yard pass from Pat Ryan (Pat Leahy kick), 2:47. Steelers 38–24. Drive:
- PIT – Walter Abercrombie 1-yard run (Gary Anderson kick), 0:37. Steelers 45–24. Drive:

Top passers

- PIT – Mark Malone – 16/27, 189 yards, 2 TD, INT
- NYJ – Ken O'Brien – 20/30, 197 yards, TD, 3 INT

Top rushers

- PIT – Earnest Jackson – 23 rushes, 101 yards
- NYJ – Freeman McNeil – 23 rushes, 137 yards

Top receivers

- PIT – John Stallworth – 5 receptions, 94 yards, TD
- NYJ – Mickey Shuler – 8 receptions, 69 yards, TD

=== Week 16: vs. Kansas City Chiefs ===
Kansas City Chiefs at Pittsburgh Steelers

Quarter	1	2	3	4	Total
Chiefs	7	17	0	0	24
Steelers	0	6	7	6	19

at Three Rivers Stadium, Pittsburgh, Pennsylvania''

- Date: December 21, 1986
- Game time: 1:00 PM EST
- Game weather: 32 °F (0 °C), wind 7 miles per hour (11 km/h; 6.1 kn), wind chill 25 °F or −3.9 °C
- Game attendance: 47,150
- Referee: Gene Barth
- TV announcers (NBC): Don Criqui (play by play), Bob Trumpy (color commentator)

Scoring summary

Quarter	Time	Drive			Team	Scoring information	Score	
Quarter	Time	Plays	Yards	TOP	Team	Scoring information	Chiefs	Steelers
1					Chiefs	Deron Cherry recovered blocked punt in end zone for touchdown	7	0
2					Chiefs	47-yard field goal by Nick Lowery	10	0
2					Steelers	31-yard field goal by Gary Anderson	10	3
2					Chiefs	Boyce Green 97 kickoff return for touchdown	17	3
2					Steelers	31-yard field goal by Gary Anderson	17	6
2					Chiefs	Lloyd Burruss 78 blocked field goal return for touchdown	24	6
3					Steelers	Mark Malone 9-yard touchdown run, Gary Anderson kick good	24	13
4					Steelers	31-yard field goal by Gary Anderson	24	16
4					Steelers	26-yard field goal by Gary Anderson	24	19
"TOP" = time of possession. For other American football terms, see Glossary of American football.							24	19

=== Standings ===
AFC Central
	W	L	T	PCT	DIV	CONF	PF	PA	STK
Cleveland Browns^{(1)}	12	4	0	.750	5–1	10–2	391	310	W5
Cincinnati Bengals	10	6	0	.625	3–3	7–5	409	394	W1
Pittsburgh Steelers	6	10	0	.375	3–3	4–8	307	336	L1
Houston Oilers	5	11	0	.313	1–5	3–9	274	329	W2
