= 1986 Cleveland Browns season =

NFL team season

- Owner: Art Modell
- General manager: Ernie Accorsi
- Head coach: Marty Schottenheimer
- Offensive coordinator: Lindy Infante
- Defensive coordinator: Dave Adolph
- Home stadium: Cleveland Municipal Stadium

Results
- Record: 12–4
- Division place: 1st AFC Central
- Playoffs: Won Divisional Playoffs (vs. Jets) 23–20 (2OT); Lost AFC Championship (vs. Broncos) 20–23 (OT)
- Pro Bowlers: T Cody Risien; NT Bob Golic; OLB Chip Banks; CB Frank Minnifield; CB Hanford Dixon

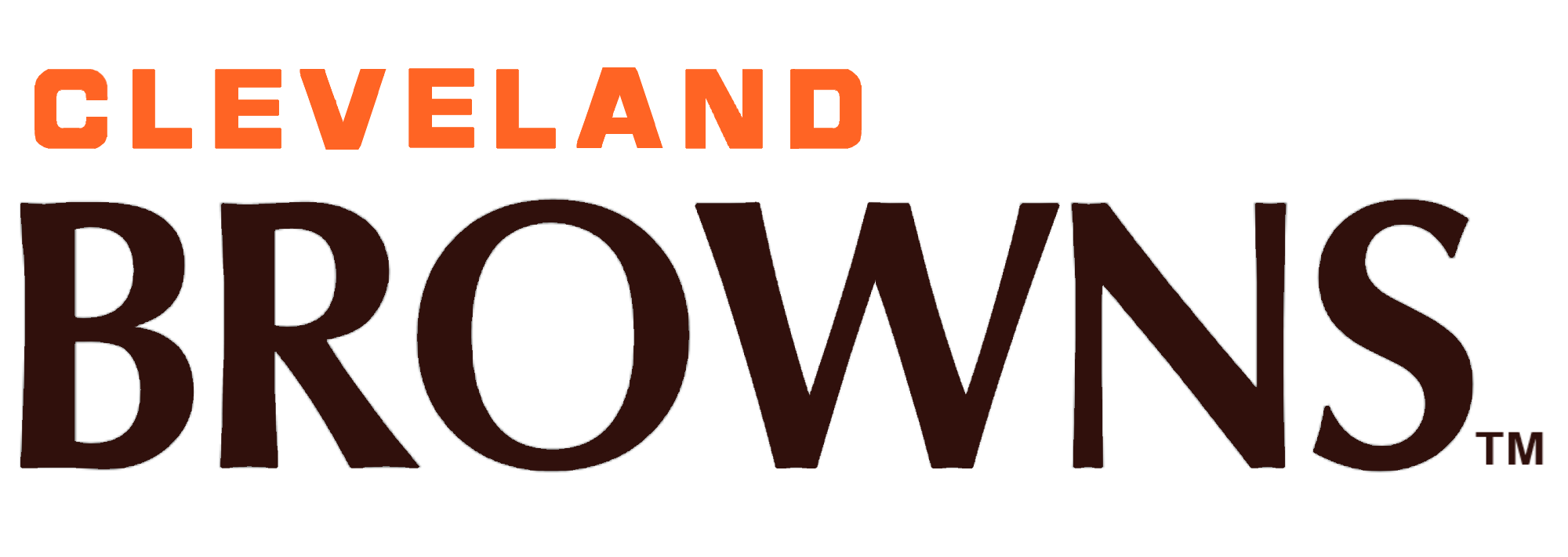
Primay script logo used by the Cleveland Browns, 1975-1995

The 1986 Cleveland Browns season was the team’s 37th season with the National Football League. The death of Don Rogers, a promising young defensive back who was preparing to enter his third season in the NFL, cast a black cloud over the team as it prepared for the 1986 season.

Cleveland won their first postseason game since 1969, and for the first time in franchise history, the Browns reached the AFC Championship Game, where they would eventually fall to the Denver Broncos, in the game famous for “The Drive.” It would be the first of three AFC Championship games that the Browns would reach in four seasons, all losses to Denver.

== Season summary ==
The 1986 Browns finished 12–4 to not only win the division again, but also set a franchise record for regular-season victories in the NFL in addition to securing home-field advantage throughout the AFC playoffs.

In one of the most pulsating games in club history, the Browns edged the New York Jets 23–20 in double-overtime in the divisional playoffs. Then, in maybe the most disappointing contest in team annals, the Browns lost to the Denver Broncos by that same score in OT in the AFC Championship Game as quarterback John Elway orchestrated what has become known as The Drive. The Browns were involved in six contests decided by three points or less, and eight decided by six points or less. There were two OT games – in consecutive weeks, no less – when the Browns beat the Pittsburgh Steelers 37–31 and the Houston Oilers 13–10, both in Cleveland. That win started the Browns on a five-game winning streak to end the season, and it was also part of a stretch in which they won eight of nine contests.

There were several other big games in addition to the two OT affairs. The Browns beat the Steelers at Three Rivers Stadium for the first time in 16 tries, 27–24. They defeated Miami 26–16 on Monday Night Football, extracting some revenge for their loss to the Dolphins in the divisional playoffs the year before. They wound up clinching the AFC Central crown by going to Cincinnati in the next-to-last game and winning soundly, 34–3. The Bengals finished in second place at 10–6 but did not make the playoffs.

Kosar's career really took off in 1986, as he threw for 3,854 yards and seventeen touchdowns with just ten interceptions for an 83.8 quarterback rating. Wide receiver Brian Brennan, who led the way with 55 receptions and six scores, was one of seven Browns to catch 28 or more passes. The backfield combo of FB Kevin Mack and HB Earnest Byner battled injuries for much of the year. That, along with the increased emphasis on passing, caused the rushing numbers to go way down. As a team, the Browns got just 1,650 yards, with Mack rushing for a team-leading 665. He did, however, run for ten scores.

Hanford Dixon and Frank Minnifield were among the top cornerbacks in the league, leading a defense that excelled down the stretch, limiting the last four opponents to 17 or fewer points.

== Offseason ==
=== NFL draft ===
1986 Cleveland Browns draft
Round	Pick	Player	Position	College	Notes
2	43	Webster Slaughter *	Wide receiver	San Diego State	
5	127	Nick Miller	Linebacker	Arkansas	
7	167	Jim Meyer	Offensive tackle	Illinois State	
7	174	Mike Norseth	Quarterback	Kansas	
9	238	Danny Taylor	Cornerback	UTEP	
10	265	Willie Smith	Tight end	Miami (FL)	
11	292	Randy Dausin	Running back	Texas A&M	
12	319	King Simmons	Cornerback	Texas Tech	
Made roster * Made at least one Pro Bowl during career

=== Undrafted free agents ===
1986 undrafted free agents of note
Player	Position	College
Valdez Baylor	Running back	Minnesota
Jon Cade	Defensive End	Louisville
Reggie Carr	Defensive End	Jackson State
Mansel Carter	Defensive tackle	Notre Dame
Eddie Coleman	Wide receiver	Fairmont State
Kyle Collins	Running back	Auburn
Joe Costello	Linebacker	Central Connecticut State
Mike Curtin	Safety	Yale
Stacey Driver	Running back	Clemson
Tom Emmons	Tackle	Oregon State
Ricky Gann	Kicker	Texas Tech
Paul Hanna	Noses Tackle	Purdue
Mark Harper	Cornerback	Alcorn State
Troy Hill	Cornerback-Safety	Pittsburgh
Enis Jackson	Cornerback	Memphis State
Gary Kalis	Guard	Akron
Ralph Malone	Defensive End	Georgia Tech
Adrian McBride	Safety-Wide receiver	Missouri
David Morrill	Noses Tackle	Ohio State
Kurt Norman	Linebacker	Hillsdale
Cliff Reid	Running back	Appalachian State
Tony Russo	Tackle	UTEP
Bill Schick	Center	Wisconsin
Mike Siano	Tight end-Wide receiver	Syracuse
Harry Skipper	Cornerback	South Carolina
Jeremiah Snowden	Running back	Mississippi Valley State
Jim Tait	Tight end	Syracuse
Louis Watson	Wide receiver	Mississippi Valley State
Clint Wilson	Tight end	Pittsburgh
Othell Wilson	CB-S	Virginia

== Personnel ==
=== Staff ===
1986 Cleveland Browns staff
Front office: President and Owner – Art Modell; Executive Vice President of Football Operations – Ernie Accorsi; Head coaches: Head Coach – Marty Schottenheimer; Offensive coaches: Offensive Coordinator/Quarterbacks – Lindy Infante; Running Backs – Joe Pendry; Receivers – Richard Mann; Tight Ends – Charlie Davis; Offensive Line – Howard Mudd	Defensive coaches: Defensive Coordinator – Dave Adolph; Defensive Line – Tom Pratt; Secondary – Tom Olivadotti; Special Assistant – Darvin Wallis; Special teams coaches: Special Teams – Bill Cowher; Strength and conditioning: Strength and Conditioning – Dave Redding

=== Roster ===
1986 Cleveland Browns roster
Quarterbacks (QB): 10 Mike Pagel; 19 Bernie Kosar; Running backs (RB): 28 Herman Fontenot; 33 Curtis Dickey; 34 Kevin Mack; 39 Major Everett; Wide receivers (WR): 80 Terry Greer; 84 Webster Slaughter; 85 Clarence Weathers; 86 Brian Brennan; 88 Reggie Langhorne; 89 Gerald McNeil; Tight ends (TE): 81 Harry Holt; 82 Ozzie Newsome; 87 Travis Tucker	Offensive linemen (OL): 61 Mike Baab C; 62 George Lilja G; 63 Cody Risien T; 69 Dan Fike G; 70 Larry Williams G; 74 Paul Farren T/G; 77 Rickey Bolden T; Defensive linemen (DL): 72 Dave Puzzuoli NT; 78 Carl Hairston DE; 79 Bob Golic NT; 90 Ralph Malone DE; 91 Sam Clancy DE; 96 Reggie Camp DE	Linebackers (LB): 50 Brad Van Pelt OLB; 51 Eddie Johnson ILB; 53 Anthony Griggs ILB; 56 Chip Banks OLB; 59 Mike Johnson ILB; 57 Clay Matthews OLB; 58 Scott Nicolas ILB; Defensive backs (DB): 22 Felix Wright FS; 23 Mark Harper CB; 24 Ray Ellis SS; 27 Al Gross SS; 29 Hanford Dixon CB; 31 Frank Minnifield CB; 37 Chris Rockins FS; 48 D. D. Hoggard CB; Special teams (ST): 3 Mark Moseley K; 7 Jeff Gossett P	Reserve: 9 Matt Bahr K (IR); 99 Keith Baldwin DE (IR); 44 Earnest Byner RB (IR); 18 Gary Danielson QB (IR); 38 Johnny Davis RB (IR); 35 Enis Jackson CB (IR); -- Jim Meyer T (IR); 52 Nick Miller LB (IR); —- Mike Norseth QB (IR); -- King Simmons S (IR); 55 Curtis Weathers LB (IR); Rookies in italics

== Regular season ==
Cleveland opened the regular season on the road against the defending Super Bowl champion Chicago Bears. While the Browns played well in scoring 31 points against the feared Chicago defense, they surrendered a season-high 41 points in a losing effort. The team responded well and won four of the next five games, including wins against divisional rivals Houston and Pittsburgh. The win against Pittsburgh snapped a losing streak for the Browns of sixteen games at Three Rivers Stadium.

After a week seven loss at home against the Green Bay Packers, the Browns won eight of their last nine regular season games to capture the AFC Central division title and finish the year with a franchise-record 12 wins (against 4 losses).

=== Schedule ===
Week	Date	Opponent	Result	Record	Venue	Attendance	Recap
1	September 7	at Chicago Bears	**L** 31–41	0–1	Soldier Field	66,030	Recap
2	September 14	at **Houston Oilers**	**W** 23–20	1–1	Houston Astrodome	46,049	Recap
3	September 18	**Cincinnati Bengals**	**L** 13–30	1–2	Cleveland Municipal Stadium	78,779	Recap
4	September 28	Detroit Lions	**W** 24–21	2–2	Cleveland Municipal Stadium	72,029	Recap
5	October 5	at **Pittsburgh Steelers**	**W** 27–24	3–2	Three Rivers Stadium	57,327	Recap
6	October 12	Kansas City Chiefs	**W** 20–7	4–2	Cleveland Municipal Stadium	71,278	Recap
7	October 19	Green Bay Packers	**L** 14–17	4–3	Cleveland Municipal Stadium	76,438	Recap
8	October 26	at Minnesota Vikings	**W** 23–20	5–3	Hubert H. Humphrey Metrodome	59,133	Recap
9	November 2	at Indianapolis Colts	**W** 24–9	6–3	Hoosier Dome	57,962	Recap
10	November 10	Miami Dolphins	**W** 26–16	7–3	Cleveland Municipal Stadium	77,949	Recap
11	November 16	at Los Angeles Raiders	**L** 14–27	7–4	Los Angeles Memorial Coliseum	65,461	Recap
12	November 23	**Pittsburgh Steelers**	**W** 37–31 (OT)	8–4	Cleveland Municipal Stadium	76,452	Recap
13	November 30	**Houston Oilers**	**W** 13–10	9–4	Cleveland Municipal Stadium	62,309	Recap
14	December 7	at Buffalo Bills	**W** 21–17	10–4	Rich Stadium	42,213	Recap
15	December 14	at **Cincinnati Bengals**	**W** 34–3	11–4	Riverfront Stadium	58,062	Recap
16	December 21	San Diego Chargers	**W** 47–17	12–4	Cleveland Municipal Stadium	68,505	Recap
Note: Intra-division opponents are in **bold** text.

=== Season summary ===
==== Week 8 at Vikings ====
Week Eight: Cleveland Browns (4–3) at Minnesota Vikings (5–2)

Quarter	1	2	3	4	Total
**Browns**	3	0	7	13	**23**
Vikings	3	14	3	0	**20**

at Hubert H. Humphrey Metrodome, Minneapolis, Minnesota

- Date: October 26, 1986
- Game time: 1:00 p.m.
- Game weather: Indoors (dome)
- Game attendance: 59,133
- Referee: Tom Dooley
- TV announcers (NBC): Charlie Jones and Jimmy Cefalo
- Box Score, Box Score

Game information

**First quarter**

- MIN – Chuck Nelson 33-yard field goal, 6:55. Vikings 3–0.
- CLE – Matt Bahr 52-yard field goal, 3:16. Tie 3–3.

**Second quarter**

- MIN – Darrin Nelson 5-yard run (Chuck Nelson kick), 5:00. Vikings 10–3.
- MIN – Anthony Carter 8-yard pass from Tommy Kramer (Chuck Nelson kick), 0:24. Vikings 17–3.

**Third quarter**

- CLE – Felix Wright 30-yard blocked punt return (Matt Bahr kick), 12:40. Vikings 17–10.
- MIN – Chuck Nelson 32-yard field goal, 3:29. Vikings 20–10.

**Fourth quarter**

- CLE – Matt Bahr 19-yard field goal, 13:13. Vikings 20–13.
- CLE – Curtis Dickey 17-yard run (Matt Bahr kick), 3:23. Tie 20–20.
- CLE – Matt Bahr 22-yard field goal, 1:46. Browns 23–20.

Top passers

- CLE – Bernie Kosar – 9/18, 101 yards, TD
- MIN – Tommy Kramer – 18/35, 261 yards, TD, INT

Top rushers

- CLE – Curtis Dickey – 19 rushes, 106 yards, TD
- MIN – Darrin Nelson – 22 rushes, 118 yards, TD

Top receivers

- CLE – Reggie Langhorne – 2 receptions, 37 yards
- MIN – Allen Rice – 4 receptions, 71 yards

==== Week 15 ====
Team	1	2	3	4	Total
• Browns	14	3	14	3	34
Bengals	3	0	0	0	3

- Date: December 14
- Location: Riverfront Stadium, Cincinnati, Ohio
- Game start: 1:00 p.m.
- Game weather: 27 °F or −2.8 °C, wind 12 miles per hour (19 km/h; 10 kn)
- Referee: Dick Jorgensen
- TV announcers (NBC): Don Criqui, Bob Trumpy

Scoring summary
1	CLE	Kevin Mack 1 yard run (Mark Moseley kick)	Browns 7–0
1	CIN	Jim Breech 23 yard field goal	Browns 7–3
1	CLE	Webster Slaughter 47 yard pass from Bernie Kosar (Mark Moseley kick)	Browns 14–3
2	CLE	Mark Moseley 39 yard field goal	Browns 17–3
3	CLE	Kevin Mack 1 yard run (Mark Moseley kick)	Browns 24–3
3	CLE	Webster Slaughter recovered fumble in end zone (Mark Moseley kick)	Browns 31–3
4	CLE	Mark Moseley 19 yard field goal	Browns 34–3

=== Standings ===
AFC Central
	W	L	T	PCT	DIV	CONF	PF	PA	STK
^{(1)} Cleveland Browns	12	4	0	.750	5–1	10–2	391	310	W5
Cincinnati Bengals	10	6	0	.625	3–3	7–5	409	394	W1
Pittsburgh Steelers	6	10	0	.375	3–3	4–8	307	336	L1
Houston Oilers	5	11	0	.313	1–5	3–9	274	329	W2

=== Best Performances ===
- Bernie Kosar, November 10, 1986, 401 passing yards vs. Miami Dolphins
- Bernie Kosar, November 23, 1986, 414 passing yards vs. Pittsburgh Steelers

== Postseason ==
The first round opponent for the Browns in the playoffs was the New York Jets. In a marathon game that lasted over four hours, the Browns won their first playoff game in 18 years, 23–20, on a 27-yard Mark Moseley field goal in double overtime.

Eight days later, the Browns hosted the Denver Broncos to determine the AFC Championship and a trip to Pasadena, California to face the New York Giants in the Super Bowl. In a repeat of the Browns' playoff game from the previous week, the game was, once again, undecided at the end of regulation with both teams having scored 20 points. Even though the Browns had star defensive players like Hanford Dixon and Frank Minnifield, the Broncos offense would not give up. The Broncos forced overtime on a 98-yard possession at the end of the fourth quarter that culminated in a game-tying touchdown and later became known simply as "The Drive". The Browns received the ball to begin the overtime period, but were forced to punt after running only three plays. The Broncos then took possession and ultimately scored the game winning points on a 33-yard field goal by Rich Karlis to send Denver to the Super Bowl.

Round	Date	Opponent (seed)	Result	Record	Venue	Recap
Division	January 3, 1987	New York Jets (4)	W 23–20	1–0	Cleveland Municipal Stadium	Recap
AFC Championship	January 11, 1987	Denver Broncos (2)	L 20–23	1–1	Cleveland Municipal Stadium	Recap

=== AFC Divisional Playoffs ===
Cleveland Browns 23, New York Jets 20 (2OT)

Quarter	1	2	3	4	OT	2OT	Total
Jets	7	3	3	7	0	0	20
Browns	7	3	0	10	0	3	23

at Cleveland Stadium, Cleveland, Ohio

- Game time: 12:30 p.m. EST
- Game attendance: 79,720
- Referee: Ben Dreith
- TV announcers (NBC): Don Criqui and Bob Trumpy

Thirty-eight-year-old Browns kicker Mark Moseley, a former Washington Redskin whom Cleveland had talked out of retirement to replace the injured Matt Bahr less than two months earlier, made the game-winning 27-yard field goal after 2:02 elapsed of the second overtime period, making this the third longest game in NFL history and giving Cleveland their first postseason win since 1969.

After Mosely missed a 46-yard field goal attempt on Cleveland's opening possession, the Jets scored first on their third drive of the game with an 82-yard drive. Quarterback Pat Ryan started it off with a 28-yard completion to Al Toon and finished it with a 42-yard touchdown pass to wide receiver Wesley Walker on a flea-flicker play. Cleveland responded with Kosar completing passes to Ozzie Newsome for gains of 21 and 23 yards as he led the team 98 yards to score on his 37-yard completion to running back Herman Fontenot. Midway through the second quarter, Jeff Gossett's 39-yard punt pinned New York back on their 4-yard line. The Jets were unable to get a first down with their drive and to make matters worse, a 3rd down sack on Ryan by a gang of Browns defenders knocked him out of the game. New York's punt gave Cleveland the ball at midfield, and they were able to take advantage of the field position, as Kosar's 25-yard completion to fullback Kevin Mack set up a 38-yard Mosely field goal that gave the Browns a 10–7 lead. The Jets, now led by Ken O'Brien, responded with less than two minutes left in the half on a last-second field goal drive to tie the game, featuring his season-long 16-yard run on fourth down and four to keep the drive alive.

Cleveland had to punt on the opening drive of the third quarter, and Kurt Sohn gave the Jets great field position with a 9-yard return to the Browns 41-yard line. New York then drove to a 37-yard Pat Leahy field goal to break the tie. Cleveland responded with a drive to the Jet's 26-yard line, but it ended with no points on another missed field goal attempt by Moseley. Early in the fourth quarter, the Browns drove to the New York 3-yard line, only to come up empty when Russell Carter intercepted a pass from Kosar in the end zone. Then after a punt, Kosar's next pass attempt was intercepted again, this time by Jerry Holmes, which set up Freeman McNeil's 25-yard touchdown run on the next play to give his team a 20–10 lead with 4:14 left in regulation. This led Jets announcer Charley Steiner to prematurely declare, "The Jets are gonna win this football game!"

But the Browns then drove 68 yards to score on Mack's 1-yard touchdown run with 1:57 left on the clock, on a drive that was aided by a roughing the passer penalty on Mark Gastineau that nullified an incompletion on second down and 24 from Cleveland's 18-yard line. After a failed onside kick attempt, the Browns stopped New York on two consecutive runs and then sacked O'Brien on a quarterback draw, bringing up 4th down on the Brown's 48-yard line. Then they got another lucky break when a punt that would have pinned them inside their 10-yard line was called back by a Jets holding penalty. On the second punt, Gerald McNeil returned the ball 10 yards to the Browns 32 with 53 seconds on the clock and no timeouts left. Following a 26-yard pass interference penalty on Carl Howard, Kosar completed a 37-yard pass to wide receiver Webster Slaughter on the Jets 5-yard line with 37 seconds to go. However, the Browns hurt themselves with excessive celebration after the catch, costing them several seconds before Kosar could break them up and get his team back to the line of scrimmage. The clock ran down to 15 seconds before the next snap, in which Kosar threw a pass that was broken up and nearly intercepted by Carter. Now with 11 seconds and no timeouts remaining, the Browns decided to play for overtime and had Moseley kick a game-tying 22-yard field goal.

After forcing the Jets to punt on the opening drive of overtime, Cleveland had a great chance to win after Kosar's 35-yard completion to Reggie Langhorne landed them at the Jet's 5-yard line. They attempted a field goal on first down, but Moseley missed the 23-yard attempt. Still, their defense continued to hold down New York, forcing them to punt on two more possessions. After the first punt, disaster nearly struck Cleveland when Mack fumbled the ball near hin 40-yard line, but Browns guard Paul Farren recovered it. With 2:38 left in the first overtime period, Cleveland got the ball on their own 31 following Dave Jennings' playoff-record 14th punt of the game. After moving the ball to the Jets 42, receiver Brian Brennan made a key play when he broke up an errant pass that was nearly intercepted by Lester Lyles. This turned out to be crucial as Brown's running game would go on to take total control of the drive. First, Fontenot rushed for seven yards and then Mack added 26 yards on his next three carries, moving the ball to the 9-yard line to set up Moseley's second game-winning field goal attempt. This time, his kick was good, winning the game for the Browns after 17:02 of overtime play on an 11-play, 59-yard drive.

Kosar set postseason records for completions (33), attempts (64), and passing yards (483), but threw only one touchdown pass and two interceptions. Newsome caught six passes for 114 yards. Mack rushed 20 times for 63 yards and a touchdown, while also catching 5 passes for 51 yards. Toon was the Jets leading receiver with 5 receptions for 93 yards. The Browns tied a playoff record by recording nine sacks in the game, three by defensive tackle Carl Hairston. Cleveland finished the game with 558 yards of total offense. 45 of the Browns' 75 rushing yards in the game were gained on their final drive.[6]

The game was featured as one of the NFL's Greatest Games the Marathon by the Lake.

This was the first postseason meeting between the Jets and Browns.[2]

=== AFC Championship Game ===
Denver Broncos 23, Cleveland Browns 20 (OT)

Quarter	1	2	3	4	OT	Total
Broncos	0	10	3	7	3	23
Browns	7	3	0	10	0	20

at Cleveland Stadium, Cleveland, Ohio

- Game time: 12:30 p.m. EST
- Game attendance: 79,973
- Referee: Chuck Heberling
- TV announcers (NBC): Dick Enberg and Merlin Olsen

This game is best remembered for The Drive in Cleveland and Denver sports lore when the Broncos drove 98 yards in 15 plays to tie the game with 37 seconds left in regulation and Denver kicker Rich Karlis kicked the game-winning 33-yard field goal 5:48 into overtime.

The Browns scored first when quarterback Bernie Kosar threw a 6-yard touchdown pass to running back Herman Fontenot at the end of an 86-yard drive. But then Cleveland turned the ball over on three consecutive drives. First Ricky Hunley intercepted Kosar's pass on the last play of the first quarter. Then after a punt, linebacker Jim Ryan picked off a Kosar pass and returned it 21 yards to the Browns 9-yard line. Denver then drove to the 1-yard line, but was halted there and decided to settle for Rich Karlis' 19-yard field goal. After the ensuing kickoff, running back Kevin Mack lost a fumble that was recovered by Ken Woodard on the Cleveland 37. On the next play, Denver quarterback John Elway's 34-yard scramble moved the ball to the 4-yard line. Once again, they ended up facing fourth down on the 1-yard line, but this time they decided to go for the touchdown and Gerald Willhite scored on a sweep right. Cleveland managed to respond with Kosar's 42-yard completion to receiver Clarence Weathers, setting up Mark Moseley's 29-yard field goal to tie the score at 10 with less than a minute left in the half.

In the second half, Elway threw his first interception of the game, a pass that was picked off near the sidelines by rookie Mark Harper. But the Broncos defense rose to the occasion and managed to force a punt. Elway then led Denver inside the BBrown's20-yard line where Karlis made a 26-yard field goal to break the tie with 2:50 left in the third quarter.

Cleveland responded with a field goal of their own, a 24-yarder from Moseley to tie the game at 13. Then after a punt, Kosar completed a 48-yard touchdown pass to Brian Brennan, making the score 20–13 with 5:43 left in regulation. On the ensuing kickoff, returner Ken Bell misplayed the kick and it hit the ground in front of him, bouncing to the 2-yard line before he managed to dive on the ball. Elway then led his team 98 yards to tie the game on wide receiver Mark Jackson's 5-yard touchdown reception with 37 seconds left in regulation. Jackson also made a big play earlier on the drive, catching a 20-yard pass from Elway on third down and 18 from the Browns 48-yard line with 1:47 to go. Overall, the drive covered 98 yards in 15 plays without ever facing a fourth down, and only facing a third down three times.

After forcing Cleveland to punt on the opening drive of overtime, Elway led the Broncos 60 yards to set up Karlis' game-winning 33-yard field goal. The key play of the drive was a 28-yard completion to Steve Watson on third down and 12 at midfield. Two carries by Sammy Winder then moved the ball to the 16-yard line where Karlis made his game-winning kick, which barely made it inside the left upright.

This game was later featured on NFL's Greatest Games.

Until the 2018 season, this was the only AFC Championship Game to go to overtime.

This was the first postseason meeting between the Broncos and Browns.[2]
