= Walter Abercrombie =

American football player (born 1959)

No. 34, 32
- Position: Running back

Personal information
- Born: September 26, 1959 (age 67); Waco, Texas, U.S.
- Listed height: 6 ft 0 in (1.83 m)
- Listed weight: 210 lb (95 kg)

Career information
- High school: University (Waco)
- College: Baylor
- NFL draft: 1982: 1st round, 12th overall pick

Career history
- Pittsburgh Steelers (1982–1987); Philadelphia Eagles (1988)

Awards and highlights
- Third-team All-American (1980); SWC Offensive Player of the Year (1980); First-team All-SWC (1980)

Career NFL statistics
- Rushing yards: 3,357
- Rushing average: 4
- Rushing touchdowns: 22
- Stats at Pro Football Reference

Walter Augustus Abercrombie (born September 26, 1959) is an American former professional football player who was a running back in the National Football League (NFL), primarily with the Pittsburgh Steelers. He played college football for the Baylor Bears. He was selected by the Steelers in first round of the 1982 NFL draft with the 12th overall pick.

Abercrombie was born and raised in Waco, Texas and was a standout running back at Waco University High School before moving down the street to Baylor University. As a standout running back for Baylor during the Grant Teaff era, Abercrombie would leave a legacy unmatched by future Bears. As a two-time consensus All-Southwest Conference selection and the school's all-time leading rusher, Abercrombie would lead Baylor to a 26–15 record on the field during his standout career that stretched from 1978 to 1981. During his first collegiate game in 1978 against No. 12 Texas A&M, Abercrombie set the standard for what was to be expected by rushing for 207 yards, establishing an NCAA record for rushing yards in a first contest. He went on to earn 1978 Southwest Conference freshman of the year honors, despite playing in just six games. During his career, he would lead Baylor to the 1979 Peach Bowl, the 1980 Southwest Conference title and an appearance in the 1981 Cotton Bowl. Abercrombie finished atop the Baylor record books in many offensive categories including yards rushed (3,665), rushing attempts (732), career 100-yard games (19) and yards per game (94). Following a remarkable career at Baylor, Abercrombie was a first-round draft pick (12th selection overall) by the Pittsburgh Steelers in 1982. He played for the Steelers from 1982 to 1987 before spending his final two seasons with the Philadelphia Eagles from 1988 to 1989. Abercrombie served as the executive director of the Baylor "B" Association (2004-2024), the school's 5700-member organization of former letterwinners

Abercrombie still resides in Waco, Texas.

== NFL career statistics ==
Year	Team	GP	Att	Yds	Avg	Lng	TD	Rec	Yds	Avg	Lng	TD
1982	PIT	6	21	100	4.8	34	2	1	14	14.0	14	0
1983	PIT	15	112	446	4.0	50	4	26	391	15.0	51	3
1984	PIT	14	145	610	4.2	31	1	16	135	8.4	59	0
1985	PIT	16	227	851	3.7	32	7	24	209	8.7	27	2
1986	PIT	16	214	877	4.1	38	6	47	395	8.4	27	2
1987	PIT	12	123	459	3.7	28	2	24	209	8.7	24	0
1988	PHI	5	5	14	2.8	5	0	1	-2	-2.0	-2	0
Career		84	847	3,357	4.0	50	22	139	1,351	9.7	59	7
