= Harry Newsome =

American football player (born 1963)

No. 18
- Position: Punter

Personal information
- Born: January 25, 1963 (age 63); Cheraw, South Carolina, U.S.
- Listed height: 6 ft 0 in (1.83 m)
- Listed weight: 192 lb (87 kg)

Career information
- High school: Cheraw (SC)
- College: Wake Forest
- NFL draft: 1985: 8th round, 214th overall pick

Career history
- Pittsburgh Steelers (1985–1989); Minnesota Vikings (1990–1993)

Awards and highlights
- Joe Greene Great Performance Award (1985); Third-team All-American (1983); First-team All-ACC (1983)

Career NFL statistics
- Punts: 683
- Punting yards: 29,030
- Average punt: 42.5
- Longest punt: 84
- Inside 20: 61
- Stats at Pro Football Reference

Harry Kent Newsome Jr. (born January 25, 1963) is an American former professional football player who was a punter in the National Football League (NFL).

Newsome was born in Cheraw, South Carolina and played scholastically at Cheraw High School. He played collegiately at Wake Forest, and was a third-team All-American as a junior.

Newsome was selected by the Pittsburgh Steelers in the eighth round of the 1985 NFL draft. He spent five years with the Steelers, followed by four years with the Minnesota Vikings.

Harry holds the record for the longest punt in Three Rivers Stadium of 84 yards. He shares with Herman Weaver the NFL record for most of his own punts blocked in a career with 14. In 1988, he set the NFL record for most of his own punts blocked in a season with 6.

Today, Newsome lives in his hometown, Cheraw, SC with his wife, Beth. Together, they have three children: Josh, Laurin, and Cody. After retirement, Newsome founded his own landscaping company.

== NFL career statistics ==
Legend
| | Led the league |
| **Bold** | Career high |

=== Regular season ===
| Year | Team | Punting | | | | | | | | | |
| Year | Team | GP | Punts | Yds | Net Yds | Lng | Avg | Net Avg | Blk | Ins20 | TB |
|---|---|---|---|---|---|---|---|---|---|---|---|
| 1985 | PIT | **16** | 78 | 3,088 | 2,568 | 59 | 39.6 | 32.5 | 1 | 17 | 7 |
| 1986 | PIT | **16** | 86 | 3,447 | 2,863 | 64 | 40.1 | 32.2 | 3 | 18 | 11 |
| 1987 | PIT | 12 | 64 | 2,678 | 2,045 | 57 | 41.8 | 31.5 | 1 | 8 | 13 |
| 1988 | PIT | **16** | 65 | 2,950 | 2,332 | 62 | 45.4 | 32.8 | **6** | 9 | 10 |
| 1989 | PIT | **16** | 82 | 3,368 | 2,827 | 57 | 41.1 | 34.1 | 1 | 15 | 9 |
| 1990 | MIN | **16** | 78 | 3,299 | 2,626 | 61 | 42.3 | 33.2 | 1 | 19 | 8 |
| 1991 | MIN | **16** | 68 | 3,095 | 2,469 | 65 | **45.5** | **36.3** | 0 | 17 | 10 |
| 1992 | MIN | **16** | 72 | 3,243 | 2,604 | **84** | 45.0 | 35.7 | 1 | 19 | **15** |
| 1993 | MIN | **16** | **90** | **3,862** | **3,182** | 64 | 42.9 | 35.4 | 0 | **25** | 6 |
| Career | | 140 | 683 | 29,030 | 23,516 | 84 | 42.5 | 33.7 | 14 | 147 | 89 |

=== Playoffs ===
| Year | Team | Punting | | | | | | | | | |
| Year | Team | GP | Punts | Yds | Net Yds | Lng | Avg | Net Avg | Blk | Ins20 | TB |
|---|---|---|---|---|---|---|---|---|---|---|---|
| 1989 | PIT | **2** | 7 | 238 | 224 | 50 | 34.0 | 28.0 | **1** | 2 | 0 |
| 1992 | MIN | 1 | 7 | **302** | 232 | 50 | **43.1** | 33.1 | 0 | 2 | 0 |
| 1993 | MIN | 1 | **8** | **302** | **277** | **57** | 37.8 | **34.6** | 0 | **3** | **1** |
| Career | | 4 | 22 | 842 | 733 | 57 | 38.3 | 31.9 | 1 | 7 | 1 |
