= Earnest Jackson =

American football player (born 1959)

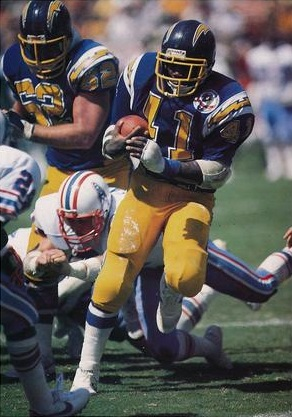
- Jackson in 1984

No. 41, 43
- Position: Running back

Personal information
- Born: December 18, 1959 (age 66); Needville, Texas, U.S.
- Listed height: 5 ft 9 in (1.75 m)
- Listed weight: 213 lb (97 kg)

Career information
- High school: Lamar Consolidated (Rosenberg, Texas)
- College: Texas A&M
- NFL draft: 1983: 8th round, 202nd overall pick

Career history
- San Diego Chargers (1983–1984); Philadelphia Eagles (1985); Pittsburgh Steelers (1986–1988); Indianapolis Colts (1989)*
- * Offseason or practice squad member only

Awards and highlights
- 2× Pro Bowl (1984, 1986)

Career NFL statistics
- Rushing yards: 4,167
- Average: 3.9
- Rushing touchdowns: 22
- Stats at Pro Football Reference

Earnest Jackson (born December 18, 1959) is an American former professional football player who was a running back in the National Football League (NFL). He was named to the Pro Bowl twice.

== Early life and college ==
Born in Needville, Texas, Jackson graduated from Lamar Consolidated High School before going to Texas A&M University in 1979. In four seasons with the Aggies, Jackson had over 2,000 yards from scrimmage and 5 touchdowns. He led the Southwest Conference in rushing yards per attempt in 1981 with 5.8 yards per carry.

== Professional career ==
Jackson played a total of six seasons in the NFL. He was drafted in the eighth round of the 1983 NFL draft by the San Diego Chargers. He played with the Chargers in 1983 and 1984, when he led the American Football Conference in rushing, with 1,179 yards for the year. He earned a starting role in the 1985 Pro Bowl. In 1985, he had another 1,000 yard-plus season, this time with the Philadelphia Eagles for 1,028 yards.

His last three NFL seasons were from 1986 to 1988 with the Pittsburgh Steelers. In 1986, he was once again a Pro Bowler running for 910 yards and 5 touchdowns. Earnest Jackson ended his career with 4,167 yards on 1059 carries along with 22 touchdowns. He also caught the ball for 695 yards on 87 receptions and 2 touchdowns.

Jackson wore number 43 in Pittsburgh, where it is now unofficially retired for Hall of Fame safety Troy Polamalu.

== NFL career statistics ==
Legend
**Bold**	Career high

Year	Team	Games		Rushing					Receiving				
Year	Team	GP	GS	Att	Yds	Avg	Lng	TD	Rec	Yds	Avg	Lng	TD
1983	SDG	12	0	11	39	3.5	6	0	5	42	8.4	10	0
1984	SDG	**16**	**14**	**296**	**1,179**	4.0	32	**8**	**39**	**222**	5.7	21	**1**
1985	PHI	**16**	11	282	1,028	3.6	**59**	5	10	126	**12.6**	25	**1**
1986	PIT	13	13	216	910	4.2	31	5	17	169	9.9	**28**	0
1987	PIT	12	9	180	696	3.9	39	1	7	52	7.4	23	0
1988	PIT	12	6	74	315	**4.3**	29	3	9	84	9.3	24	0
		81	53	1,059	4,167	3.9	59	22	87	695	8.0	28	2
