= Mike Merriweather =

American football player (born 1960)

No. 57, 97, 58
- Position: Linebacker

Personal information
- Born: November 26, 1960 (age 65); Albany, New York, U.S.
- Listed height: 6 ft 2 in (1.88 m)
- Listed weight: 220 lb (100 kg)

Career information
- High school: Vallejo (Vallejo, California)
- College: Pacific
- NFL draft: 1982: 3rd round, 70th overall pick

Career history
- Pittsburgh Steelers (1982–1987); Minnesota Vikings (1989–1992); New York Jets (1993); Green Bay Packers (1993)

Awards and highlights
- 3× Second-team All-Pro (1984, 1985, 1987); 3× Pro Bowl (1984–1986)

Career NFL statistics
- Sacks: 41
- Interceptions: 18
- Fumble recoveries: 16
- Defensive touchdowns: 5
- Stats at Pro Football Reference

Michael Lamar Merriweather (born November 26, 1960) is an American former professional football player who was a linebacker in the National Football League (NFL). He played college football for the Pacific Tigers and was selected by the Pittsburgh Steelers in the third round of the 1982 NFL draft. He played professionally for the Steelers, Minnesota Vikings, New York Jets, and Green Bay Packers during the 1980s and 1990s.

== Early life ==
Merriweather was born in Albany, New York, and attended Vallejo High School in northern California, where he played football, baseball, and basketball. He graduated from University of the Pacific in Stockton, where he played college football for the Tigers. Merriweather is a member of Alpha Phi Alpha fraternity.

== Professional career ==
Merriweather was selected in the third round (70th overall) of the 1982 NFL draft by the Pittsburgh Steelers. He was elected to the Pro Bowl in three consecutive seasons: 1984, 1985, and 1986. In 1984, Merriweather was fifth in the NFL with fifteen sacks (Mark Gastineau led the league with 22), and was named first-team all-NFL that year. He was named the Steelers' Most Valuable Player in 1987.

After a salary dispute which saw him sit out the entire 1988 season, Merriweather was traded to the Minnesota Vikings for a first-round pick. In his first season with Minnesota in 1989, he became the first in NFL history to score the winning points in an overtime game with a safety when he blocked a punt out of the end zone in a game against the Los Angeles Rams for a final score of 23–21. Vikings' placekicker Rich Karlis had scored a then-record seven field goals, accounting for all 21 points that sent the game into overtime.

Merriweather's last year at Minnesota was 1992, and he played his final season in 1993 for the New York Jets and Green Bay Packers.

In 1993, Merriweather was inducted into the Pacific Athletics Hall of Fame. He was inducted into the Vallejo Sports Hall of Fame in 2004, and was inducted into the Sac-Joaquin Section Hall of Fame in 2012.

== Life after the NFL ==
After leaving the NFL, Merriweather worked as an insurance broker in Sacramento, California. In 2013, he became the athletic director at Vacaville Christian High School. He and his wife Sandra live in Stockton, California.
