= Anthony Henton =

American football player (born 1963)

No. 96, 52
- Position: Linebacker

Personal information
- Born: July 27, 1963 (age 63); Bessemer, Alabama, U.S.
- Listed height: 6 ft 1 in (1.85 m)
- Listed weight: 218 lb (99 kg)

Career information
- High school: Jess Lanier (Birmingham, Alabama)
- College: Troy State
- NFL draft: 1986: 9th round, 234th overall pick

Career history
- Pittsburgh Steelers (1986–1988); Seattle Seahawks (1989)*; Sacramento Surge (1991); Birmingham Fire (1992)
- * Offseason or practice squad member only

Career NFL statistics
- Fumble recoveries: 1
- Stats at Pro Football Reference

Oscar Anthony Henton (born July 27, 1963) is an American former professional football player who played two seasons in the National Football League (NFL) with the Pittsburgh Steelers.

== Early life ==
Henton was born in Bessemer, Alabama where he later attended Jess Lanier High School.

He matriculated at Troy State University.

== College career ==
Henton attended Troy State University, Troy, Alabama where he majored in Business Administration. He was chosen Gulf South Conference Freshmen of the Year in 1982 while playing nose guard, before finishing his college career as outside linebacker. Made All-Gulf South Conference Linebacker in 1984. During his four years at Troy he had 87 tackles, 118 assist, 11 sacks and 7 broken passes.

== Professional career ==
Henton was selected by the Pittsburgh Steelers in the ninth round of the 1986 NFL draft. During his first season in Pittsburgh, he was voted as the Steelers Defensive Rookie of the Year and honored with the prestigious "Mean Joe Greene Award". He played two seasons for the Steelers at linebacker. In 1991, Henton was selected by the Sacramento Surge becoming the first pick in the first round for the World League Of American Football (WLAF). During the 1992 season, his former college coach, Chan Gailey, went into negotiations with the Surge to bring Henton back home to Birmingham where he finished his career as a professional football player.
