= King Simmons =

American football player (born 1963)

No. 41
- Position: Defensive back

Personal information
- Born: February 12, 1963 (age 63); Atlanta, Georgia, U.S.
- Listed height: 6 ft 2 in (1.88 m)
- Listed weight: 200 lb (91 kg)

Career information
- High school: Killeen (Killeen, Texas)
- College: Texas Tech
- NFL draft: 1986: 12th round, 319th overall pick

Career history
- Cleveland Browns (1986); San Diego Chargers (1987); Indianapolis Colts (1988)*; Hamilton Tiger-Cats (1988)
- * Offseason or practice squad member only
- Stats at Pro Football Reference

King David Simmons (born February 12, 1963) is an American former professional football player who was a defensive back for the San Diego Chargers of the National Football League (NFL). He played college football for the Texas Tech Red Raiders and was selected by the Cleveland Browns in the 12th round of the 1986 NFL draft.

== Early life ==
King David Simmons was born on February 12, 1963, in Atlanta, Georgia. He participated in high school football and track at Killeen High School in Killeen, Texas, with his final year being in 1981.

== College career ==
Simmons accepted a track scholarship to Texas Tech University. He was among the Southwest Conference leaders in the 4 × 400 metres relay during the spring 1982 track season. He also participated in the 110 metres hurdles during his time at Texas Tech. Simmons walked on to the football team but did not play during the 1983 season. In April 1984, it was reported that Simmons had earned the starting free safety position. He was a two-year football letterman from 1984 to 1985.

== Professional career ==
Simmons was selected by the Cleveland Browns in the 12th round of the 1986 NFL draft with the 319th overall pick. On August 26, 1986, he was placed on injured reserve due to an ankle injury, and remained on injured reserve for the entire 1986 season. They released him on September 1, 1987, after the third game of the 1987 preseason. His agent, Frank Murtha, used a computer to send info on Simmons to all 28 NFL teams, a novel concept for the time period. He had a workout with the Atlanta Falcons on September 7 but was not signed.

On September 23, 1987, Simmons signed with the San Diego Chargers. He played in all three of the Chargers' strike games, starting in one of them, and posted 1.5 sacks. (Note: Click the History button, scroll to find 1987.) He was released on October 19.

Simmons was signed by the Indianapolis Colts on May 2, 1988, then released on July 22, 1988, and thereafter started working for a marketing company in Austin, Texas.

On October 12, 1988, it was reported that Simmons had been signed to the practice roster of the Hamilton Tiger-Cats of the Canadian Football League. While driving to the airport to go to Canada, he hit a deer. He was later promoted to the Tiger-Cats' active roster and played in one game, posting three solo tackles; he was then moved back to the practice roster, and was released on November 5, 1988. Hamilton signed him again on May 29, 1989, and released him a month later, after their first preseason game.

== Personal life ==
Simmons was also an avid golfer.
