= Warren Seitz =

American football player (born 1962)

No. 80, 84
- Positions: Tight end, wide receiver

Personal information
- Born: September 29, 1962 (age 64); Kansas City, Missouri, U.S.
- Listed height: 6 ft 4 in (1.93 m)
- Listed weight: 217 lb (98 kg)

Career information
- High school: Topeka (KS) West
- College: Missouri
- NFL draft: 1986: 10th round, 260th overall pick

Career history
- Pittsburgh Steelers (1986); New York Giants (1987)
- Stats at Pro Football Reference

Warren Seitz (born September 29, 1962) is an American former professional football player who was a tight end and wide receiver in the National Football League (NFL). He played for the Pittsburgh Steelers in 1986 and for the New York Giants in 1987. He was selected by the Steelers in the tenth round of the 1986 NFL draft.
