= Jesse Kaye =

American football player (1944–2023)

No. 11, 10
- Position: Quarterback

Personal information
- Born: March 7, 1944; South Bend, Indiana, U.S.
- Died: June 3, 2023 (aged 79); Green Bay, Wisconsin, U.S.
- Listed height: 6 ft 0 in (1.83 m)
- Listed weight: 190 lb (86 kg)

Career information
- High school: Premontre (Green Bay)
- College: Tampa
- NFL draft: 1967: undrafted

Career history
- Saskatchewan Roughriders (1967); Spokane Shockers (1968); Miami Dolphins (1970)*; Manitowoc Chiefs (1972); Lake County Rifles (1973); Southern California Sun (1974)*; Philadelphia Bell (1974)*; Minnesota Vikings (1974)*; Manitowoc Chiefs (1974)
- * Offseason or practice squad member only

Jesse Wayne Kaye (March 7, 1944 – June 3, 2023) was an American football player and scout. He played college football for the Wisconsin Badgers and Tampa Spartans as a quarterback. He played professionally for the Saskatchewan Roughriders of the Canadian Football League (CFL) and was on the Miami Dolphins' taxi squad in 1970. He was a scout in the NFL from 1986 to 2014.

== Early life ==
Jesse Wayne Kaye was born on March 7, 1944, in South Bend, Indiana. He played high school football at Premontre High School in Green Bay under head coach Ted Fritsch, earning all-metro honors.

== College career ==
Kaye enrolled at the University of Colorado Boulder to play college football for the Buffaloes. He played quarterback for the freshmen team in 1962. He was the Buffaloes' third-string quarterback at varsity team practices in spring 1963. In late August 1963, it was reported that Kaye had left the school and would not be returning.

In 1964, Kaye transferred to the University of Wisconsin. He began the 1964 season as the backup to Hal Brandt. On November 13, 1964, it was reported that head coach Milt Bruhn had benched Brandt in favor of Kaye. Kaye played in nine games overall during the 1964 season, completing 18 of 41 passes (43.9%) for 439 yards and two interceptions. He played left halfback in 1965, appearing in ten games while rushing 48 times for 111 yards and completing two of nine passes for 16 yards.

Kaye transferred to the University of Tampa in 1966. He was the starting quarterback for the Spartans during the 1966 season, completing 157 of 331 passes (47.4%) for 1,891 yards, 14 touchdowns, and 19 interceptions. His 331 passing attempts were the most among independents that year.

== Professional career ==
After going undrafted in the 1967 NFL/AFL draft, Kaye signed with the Saskatchewan Roughriders of the Canadian Football League (CFL) on April 12, 1967. He dressed in five games for the Roughriders in 1967 as a backup quarterback, recording five completions on 25 attempts for 77 yards and two interceptions. Saskatchewan advanced to the 55th Grey Cup but lost to the Hamilton Tiger-Cats by a score of 24–1. After the season, it was reported that Kaye would be returning to the University of Tampa to finish his degree.

Kaye played for the Spokane Shockers of the Continental Football League in 1968, completing 106 of 268 passes (39.6%) for 1,512 yards, seven touchdowns, and 17 interceptions while also rushing 12 times for -4 yards and one touchdown.

Kaye was signed by the Miami Dolphins in May 1970. He spent the 1970 season on the Dolphins' taxi squad. Members of the Dolphins' taxi squad did not see much practice time. The Miami News noted that taxi squad members had to practice by themselves after the regular practice, humorously stating "Life for Jesse Kaye is dropping back to pass 50 times every Friday, with nobody watching."

Kaye played semi-pro football for the Manitowoc Chiefs of the Central States Football League (CSFL) in 1972, earning league MVP honors. He threw 23 touchdowns for the CSFL's Lake County Rifles in 1973, garnering league MVP recognition and helping Lake County win the league title.

In March 1974, Kaye signed with the Southern California Sun of the upstart World Football League (WFL). On May 24, Kaye was among five players traded to the Philadelphia Bell for Tim Guy. On June 14, 1974, it was reported that Kaye had been waived by the Bell.

Kaye then signed with the Minnesota Vikings. Due to the 1974 NFL players strike, he was the starting quarterback for the Vikings' preseason opener on August 10 against the Denver Broncos. He played the first half of the game, completing four of 17 passes for 28 yards and one interception. Kaye was cut on August 15, 1974.

In early September 1974, Kaye re-signed with the Manitowoc Chiefs for the 1974 season. He left the team in October 1974 for a job in Alaska.

== Scouting career ==
Kaye worked for the BLESTO scouting combine service from 1984 to 1985. He was a scout for the Pittsburgh Steelers 1986 to 1988. In May 1989, he was hired as a scout for the Green Bay Packers. In January 1992, Kaye was promoted to director of pro scouting. He was replaced with Ted Thompson in 1994.

In August 1994, the New York Jets hired Kaye to be a college scout. He was promoted to director of college scouting in 2002. In 2007, the Jets awarded Kaye a game ball for filing 10,000 player evaluation reports in his career. He retired from the Jets in 2014.

== Personal life ==
Kaye suffered a stroke in 2016. He died on June 3, 2023, in Green Bay, Wisconsin.
