= Cam Jacobs =

American football player (1962–2023)

No. 91
- Position: Linebacker

Personal information
- Born: March 10, 1962; Oklahoma City, Oklahoma, U.S.
- Died: February 18, 2023 (aged 60)
- Listed height: 6 ft 2 in (1.88 m)
- Listed weight: 230 lb (104 kg)

Career information
- High school: Coral Gables (Coral Gables, Florida)
- College: Kentucky
- NFL draft: 1985: 5th round, 136th overall pick

Career history
- Pittsburgh Steelers (1985)*; Tampa Bay Buccaneers (1987)
- * Offseason or practice squad member only

Awards and highlights
- Second-team All-SEC (1984)
- Stats at Pro Football Reference

Thomas Cameron Jacobs (March 10, 1962 – February 18, 2023) was an American football linebacker who played in the National Football League (NFL) for the Tampa Bay Buccaneers. Known most notably as a replacement player during the 1987 NFL strike, Jacobs was originally drafted by the Pittsburgh Steelers in the fifth round of the 1985 NFL draft. He played college football at Kentucky.

== Death ==
Jacobs died on February 18, 2023, at the age of 60.
