= Frank Pokorny (American football) =

American football player (born 1963)

No. 85
- Position: Wide receiver

Personal information
- Born: May 13, 1963 (age 63); Uniontown, Pennsylvania, U.S.
- Listed height: 6 ft 0 in (1.83 m)
- Listed weight: 198 lb (90 kg)

Career information
- High school: Center
- College: Youngstown State
- NFL draft: 1985: undrafted

Career history
- Pittsburgh Steelers (1985)
- Stats at Pro Football Reference

Frank Edward Pokorny (born May 13, 1963) is an American former professional football wide receiver who played for the Pittsburgh Steelers of the National Football League (NFL). He played college football at Youngstown State University.
