= Dave Adolph =

American football coach (1937–2017)

Personal information
- Born: June 6, 1937; Akron, Ohio, U.S.
- Died: February 12, 2017 (aged 79); Dublin, Ohio, U.S.

Career information
- High school: Mogadore (OH)
- College: Akron

Career history
- East Cleveland Shaw HS (1961–62); Akron (1963–64) Graduate assistant; Connecticut (1965–68) Linebackers coach; Kentucky (1968–73) Linebackers coach; Illinois (1973–77) Linebackers coach; Ohio State (1977–78) Defensive line coach; Cleveland Browns (1979–84) Defensive line coach, linebackers coach & defensive coordinator; San Diego Chargers (1985) Defensive coordinator; Cleveland Browns (1986–88) Defensive coordinator; Los Angeles Raiders (1989–91) Defensive coordinator; Kansas City Chiefs (1992–94) Defensive coordinator; San Diego Chargers (1995–96) Defensive coordinator; Oakland Raiders (1997–98) Linebackers coach; Kansas City Chiefs (1999) Linebackers coach; San Diego (2004–07) Defensive coordinator & linebackers coach; Ohio State (2008–13) Supplemental staff; Michigan (2015–16) Data analyst
- Coaching profile at Pro Football Reference

Dave Adolph (June 6, 1937 – February 12, 2017) was an American football coach. He served as defensive coordinator for the Cleveland Browns from 1986 to 1988. Prior to leaving the Browns in 1985 for the San Diego Chargers, he was the Browns' interim defensive coordinator in 1984. The promotion occurred after Marty Schottenheimer was elevated from the team's defensive coordinator position to head coach midway through the season. He joined Schottenheimer as his defensive coordinator for the Kansas City Chiefs from 1992 to 1994. Adolph was the defensive coordinator in four AFC championship games for three different NFL teams.

== Coaching career ==
Adolph, one of few football staff members to serve both the Michigan and Ohio State programs, was selected to serve as honorary captain for both teams on the same day for the Michigan–Ohio State football game in Columbus, Ohio on November 26, 2016.

NFL All-Pro players coached by Dave Adolph include: Lyle Alzado, Clay Matthews Jr., Chip Banks, Tom Cousineau, Howie Long, Bob Golic, Hanford Dixon, Frank Minnifield, Scott Studwell, Derrick Thomas, and Junior Seau.
