= Steve Morse (American football) =

American football player (born 1963)

No. 47
- Position: Fullback

Personal information
- Born: May 28, 1963 (age 63); Mobile, Alabama, U.S.
- Listed height: 5 ft 11 in (1.80 m)
- Listed weight: 211 lb (96 kg)

Career information
- High school: John Shaw (Mobile)
- College: Virginia
- NFL draft: 1985: undrafted

Career history
- Pittsburgh Steelers (1985)
- Stats at Pro Football Reference

Steven Bryan Morse (born May 28, 1963) is an American former professional football fullback who played for the Pittsburgh Steelers of the National Football League (NFL). He played college football for the Virginia Cavaliers.

== Early life ==
Steven Bryan Morse was born on May 28, 1963, in Mobile, Alabama. He attended John Shaw High School in Mobile.

== College career ==
Morse enrolled at University of Virginia to play college football for the Cavaliers. He joined the team as a fifth-string walk-on defensive end. He was a four-year letterman from 1981 to 1984. Morse played in four games in 1981 as a linebacker. He appeared in 11 games as a defensive lineman in 1982, recording one interception for 16 yards. He converted to fullback in 1983. He finished his college career with 162 carries for 804 yards and four touchdowns, and nine receptions for 104 yards. Morse graduated with a degree in chemical engineering.

== Professional career ==
After going undrafted in the 1985 NFL draft, Morse signed with the Pittsburgh Steelers on June 10, 1985. Morse said he already had a job lined up at Dow Chemical as a chemical engineer but wanted to try football first. He was released on September 2 but re-signed the next day. Morse played in all 16 games for the Steelers during the 1985 season as a reserve fullback, rushing eight times for 17 yards while also recovering a fumble. He was released on September 1, 1986, before the start of the 1986 regular season.

== Personal life ==
After his NFL career, Morse worked at Dow Chemical. He later moved to Houston and started his own real estate business.
