= Dave Edwards (defensive back) =

American football player (born 1962)

No. 42
- Position: Defensive back

Personal information
- Born: March 31, 1962 (age 64); Senoia, Georgia, U.S.
- Listed height: 6 ft 0 in (1.83 m)
- Listed weight: 195 lb (88 kg)

Career information
- High school: Columbia (Decatur, Georgia)
- College: Illinois
- NFL draft: 1985: undrafted

Career history
- Pittsburgh Steelers (1985–1987); Tampa Bay Buccaneers (1988)*
- * Offseason or practice squad member only

Career NFL statistics
- Interceptions: 1
- Safeties: 1
- Stats at Pro Football Reference

David Lee Edwards (born March 31, 1962) is an American former professional football player who was a defensive back for three seasons in the National Football League (NFL) with the Pittsburgh Steelers. He played college football for the Illinois Fighting Illini.
