= Rich Erenberg =

American football player (born 1962)

No. 24
- Position: Running back

Personal information
- Born: April 17, 1962 (age 64); Chappaqua, New York, U.S.
- Listed height: 5 ft 10 in (1.78 m)
- Listed weight: 200 lb (91 kg)

Career information
- High school: Horace Greeley (Chappaqua)
- College: Colgate
- NFL draft: 1984: 9th round, 247th overall pick

Career history
- Pittsburgh Steelers (1984–1986)

Career NFL statistics
- Rushing yards: 642
- Rushing average: 3.7
- Total touchdowns: 10
- Stats at Pro Football Reference

Richard Mark Erenberg (born April 17, 1962) is an American former professional football player who was a running back for three seasons in the National Football League (NFL). He played college football for the Colgate Raiders before playing in the NFL for the Pittsburgh Steelers, who selected him 247th overall in the ninth round of the 1984 NFL draft. As of 2009, he was tied for the most kickoff returns in a single game by a Steeler with seven on September 2, 1984. He currently resides in Peters Township, Pennsylvania.

== Early life ==
Erenberg graduated from Horace Greeley High School in 1980.
