= Preston Gothard =

American football player (born 1962)

No. 86
- Position: Tight end

Personal information
- Born: February 23, 1962 (age 64); Montgomery, Alabama, U.S.
- Listed height: 6 ft 4 in (1.93 m)
- Listed weight: 239 lb (108 kg)

Career information
- High school: Lowndes Academy
- College: Alabama
- NFL draft: 1985: undrafted

Career history
- Pittsburgh Steelers (1985–1988)

Career NFL statistics
- Receptions: 41
- Receiving yards: 459
- Touchdowns: 3
- Stats at Pro Football Reference

Preston Gothard (born February 23, 1962) is an American former professional football player who was a tight end for five seasons with the Pittsburgh Steelers of the National Football League (NFL). He played college football for the Alabama Crimson Tide.
