= Mark Behning =

American football player and coach (born 1961)

No. 66
- Position: Offensive tackle

Personal information
- Born: September 26, 1961 (age 65); Alpena, Michigan, U.S.
- Listed height: 6 ft 6 in (1.98 m)
- Listed weight: 290 lb (132 kg)

Career information
- High school: Denton (TX)
- College: Nebraska
- NFL draft: 1985: 2nd round, 47th overall pick

Career history
- Pittsburgh Steelers (1985–1987); San Diego Chargers (1988)*
- * Offseason or practice squad member only

Awards and highlights
- First-team All-Big Eight (1984)

Career NFL statistics
- Games played: 16
- Games started: 1
- Stats at Pro Football Reference

Mark Gerald Behning (born September 26, 1961) is an American former professional football player who played three seasons as an offensive lineman with the Pittsburgh Steelers of the National Football League (NFL) from 1985 to 1987. He is currently a senior project manager for Golden Sands General Contractors.

== Early life ==
Behning was born in Alpena, Michigan and attended Denton High School in Denton, Texas, where he was named all-state in football in 1979. He also earned the rank of Eagle Scout in the Boy Scouts of America.

He matriculated at the University of Nebraska. At Nebraska, Behning was named to the Academic All Big 8 first-team in football in 1984. He was also named an All-American in 1984 by the National Strength and Conditioning Association. He played on the North team in the 1985 Senior Bowl.

== Football career ==
Behning was selected by the Pittsburgh Steelers in the second round of the 1985 NFL draft. He was on the Steelers roster for three seasons. He spent his rookie season on injured reserve after breaking his arm in training camp. His only start in his career came in 1986. After being cut by the Steelers during training camp in 1988, he was picked up by the San Diego Chargers.An Achilles injury cut his career short which in turn caused Behning to be released by San Diego. The Miami Dolphins expressed interest but had requested surgery be performed on the injured achilles before moving forward. Behning instead made the decision to go back to Nebraska and finish college to attain his engineering degree. He never played in the NFL again.

== Post-football career ==
Behning teaches industrial technology and coaches varsity football and track at his alma mater, Denton High School. He currently holds the position of Offensive Line Assistant Coach for the Denton High Broncos football team. He holds an engineering degree from Nebraska as well as a Masters of Education from Southeastern Oklahoma State University.

== Personal ==
Behning has two daughters, two sons and five grandchildren.
