= 2020 CFL season =

Canadian Football League season

- Duration: June 11 – November 2020 (season cancelled due to the COVID-19 pandemic in Canada)

CFL seasons
- ← 2019 2021 →

Locations of the active CFL teams West East

The 2020 CFL season would have been the 67th season of modern-day Canadian football. Officially, it would have been the 63rd season of the Canadian Football League.

It was originally scheduled to begin on June 11; on April 7, the start of the season was delayed to begin no sooner than July due to the COVID-19 pandemic in Canada. The CFL planned to obtain financial assistance from the federal government. In May, the CFL delayed the season to no sooner than September, and announced that the Grey Cup was to be played as a home advantage game rather than as a neutral site game in Regina, Saskatchewan, as originally planned. In July, the CFL announced plans to tentatively play all games in Winnipeg, Manitoba, as a "hub city".

On August 17, the CFL announced that the season had been cancelled, citing the league's inability to obtain appropriate loans and subsidies from the federal government in order to cover operating costs and compensate for playing behind closed doors without paid ticketholders. Due to the cancellation of the season, Regina's chance at hosting the Grey Cup game was shifted to 2022.

== League business ==
=== Salary cap ===
Per the collective bargaining agreement, the 2020 salary cap was at least $5,300,000 (average of $115,217 per active roster spot). That number was subject to change as players had revenue sharing of 20% from broadcast deals with TSN and international deals. The base individual minimum salary increased to $65,000 in 2020 for National and American players and was set at $54,000 for Global players. CFL draft picks were subject to a pay scale starting in this season, with first round picks earning $80,000, at maximum, with the lowest round picks earning a maximum of $75,000. All National and Global players signing their first CFL contracts had to sign two-year-plus-an-option contracts while first-year American players had to sign one-year-plus-an-option contracts.

=== Atlantic Canada expansion ===
On December 10, 2019, the proposed revival of the Atlantic Schooners expansion team received a $20 million one-time rebate from the Halifax government towards the building of a stadium there, conditional upon support from the government of Nova Scotia and building the stadium at an alternative site after the council rejected building at the proposed site in Shannon Park. Ownership of the Schooners had originally hoped to start playing during the 2020 season in Croix-Bleue Medavie Stadium in Moncton, New Brunswick, while the new stadium was being built, but, as of December 2019, were planning to start play during the 2022 CFL season.

=== Football operations cap ===
For the second consecutive season, the league imposed cap regulations on coaching and operations staff, with the total compensation of the combined 11 coaches and 14 other football operations staff being set at $2,588,000. In the same manner as the player salary cap, teams that exceed the cap by up to $100,000 were penalized the same amount they are over and for teams that exceeded the cap by over $100,000, they also forfeited draft picks.

=== Montreal Alouettes ownership ===
On January 6, the CFL announced that Sid Spiegel and Gary Stern of Crawford Steel had acquired the Montreal Alouettes; their holding company, S and S Sportsco oversaw the team's operations.

=== Renaming of the Edmonton Eskimos ===
On July 21, Edmonton's CFL team retired its "Eskimos" branding; the term Eskimo has been considered an offensive term to refer to the Inuit, while team sponsor Belairdirect had threatened to cut its ties with the Eskimos unless it dropped the name. The team temporarily used "Edmonton Football Team" and "EE Football Team" until a new name was decided. The following June, the team announced its new name would be the Edmonton Elks.

=== Media rights ===
On November 21, 2019, the CFL announced that it had renewed its media rights with Bell Media's TSN and RDS for an undisclosed long-term period. Independent reports indicated that the agreement extended to 2025, adding four additional years to the existing agreement that had been set to expire after 2021; TSN has held exclusive rights to all CFL telecasts since 2008.

== Cancellation of the season ==
The regular season schedule was unveiled on December 16, 2019, a 21-week season initially scheduled to begin on June 11 with a kickoff game between Edmonton and BC. The league continued its larger focus on Saturday primetime games and fewer triple headers, with only one Sunday game (the Winnipeg/Saskatchewan Labour Day weekend game) and three Monday games scheduled. 28 Friday Night Football games (eight double-headers) and 13 Thursday Night Football games were also part of the schedule. The Touchdown Atlantic game was also scheduled to be held between the Argos and Roughriders at Huskies Stadium in Halifax on July 25.

On March 12, the CFL cancelled its regional combines in Edmonton and Montreal, and the CFL National Combine in Toronto, due to the COVID-19 pandemic. Free-agent scouting camps in the United States planned by teams were also cancelled. The 2020 Global Draft, scheduled for April 16, was postponed to coincide with the opening of training camps, while the 2020 CFL draft was held as scheduled on April 30. On March 19, TSN's Dave Naylor reported that the league had ordered the closure of team training facilities.

On March 30, the league announced the indefinite postponement of training camps, which had been scheduled to begin on May 13. In a March 31 interview with CBC Sports, Commissioner Randy Ambrosie stated that the league had been exploring "all options available" and "[wants] to play as much football as we can", explaining that "things are changing so quickly. We're not installing an artificial timetable. We're looking at all the components of what would go into a training camp and what are the compressed scenarios looking like." He added that a complete cancellation of the season would be "devastating financially".

As late as April 7, the league intended to play a full schedule of games. On that day, Ambrosie announced that the start of the season would be postponed until at least the beginning of July. On April 29, Prime Minister Justin Trudeau said that the CFL had requested financial assistance from the federal government; the league requested $30 million in immediate aid, up to an additional $130 million in the event the season was cancelled entirely, and stated that it planned to pay this back via various initiatives, including "community and public education programs across the country, the use of our digital channels, stadiums and broadcasts for advertising and promotion, and tourism initiatives surrounding the Grey Cup and other CFL events".

On May 14, it was reported that the league and CFLPA were discussing the possibility of holding games at centralized locations.

On May 20, Ambrosie announced that the season would not begin until at least September, citing numerous provincial and local bans on large gatherings until at least September 1. He also announced that the Grey Cup would not be held as a neutral site game in Regina as was originally awarded. If held, it was to be played at the home field of the finalist with the better regular season record. Regina's hosting of the Grey Cup was postponed to 2022.

On July 21, the CFL announced that it was tentatively pursuing a "hub city" model where all games would be played at a single location, and that Winnipeg (beating a bid by Regina and the Saskatchewan Roughriders) had been selected as the provisional hub city. The league reiterated that a federal subsidy would be required in addition to players' union and public health approval for the hub city proposal to go forward.

On August 16, Dave Naylor reported that the federal government had denied a request by the CFL for a $30 million loan, and that there was a high probability that the season would be cancelled outright. On August 17, Commissioner Ambrosie announced that the season had been cancelled. Ambrosie said that the league had secured union approval for the hub city plan, but was unwilling to take the high-interest loans the government was offering. He added that the league could not play behind closed doors unless the government offered subsidies that the league would not have to pay back (which would compensate for the lack of ticket sales). According to Ambrosie, the government's proposal would have put the league's owners, especially the three community-owned teams, at risk in the long term. Additionally, the Public Health Agency of Canada was unable to provide a timeline for approving the hub city proposal. Ambrosie stated that the league would instead focus on the 2021 season and effectively guaranteed that a 2021 season would be played; this marked the first time the Grey Cup was not awarded since 1919, when a rules dispute, the overall lack of desire to contest for the trophy, and the country's slow recovery from the Spanish flu epidemic led to no game being played that year.

Players were permitted to void their contracts on August 24.

== Player movement ==
=== Free agency ===
The 2020 free agency period began on February 11 at noon ET. Pending free agents and teams were able to negotiate offers for one week starting February 2 at noon ET and ending February 9 at noon ET. Previously, players and teams could only discuss potential contracts once the free agency period had started. All formal offers to a player during this time were sent to both the league and the players union and could not be rescinded. Once that negotiating window closed, all teams had until February 11 at 10:00 a.m. to exclusively negotiate with their own pending free agents, including being able to review contract offers that their players received from other teams. Thereafter, players had two hours to review all offers that they have received and may select one and inform the league. If that player did not select any contract offer in that period, he becomes an unrestricted free agent. The most prominent signings during the free agency period are listed in the table below:

Team	Top 30 Free Agents (CFL.ca rank)
BC Lions	Micah Johnson (8)
Calgary Stampeders	Sean McEwen (11)
Edmonton	Mike Moore* (17)
Hamilton Tiger-Cats	Ja'Gared Davis* (4), Dylan Wynn* (7), Larry Dean (19), Frankie Williams* (20), Jumal Rolle* (28)
Montreal Alouettes	Geno Lewis* (16), Ciante Evans* (29)
Ottawa Redblacks	Nick Arbuckle (6), Lewis Ward* (12), Cleyon Laing (13), Don Unamba (21)
Toronto Argonauts	Matt Nichols (2), McLeod Bethel-Thompson* (14), DaVaris Daniels (23), Juwan Brescacin (27)
Saskatchewan Roughriders	Shaq Evans* (9), Cameron Judge* (10), Solomon Elimimian* (18), Ed Gainey* (22)
Winnipeg Blue Bombers	Willie Jefferson* (1), Zach Collaros* (3), Darvin Adams* (24)
Free Agents	Derel Walker (5), C.J. Gable (30)
Other	Derek Dennis (15 - XFL), Chris Streveler (25 – NFL), S.J. Green (26 – XFL)

*denotes the player was re-signed by their original team

==== NFL window ====
On December 13, 2019, the CFLPA filed a grievance against the league regarding the NFL window. According to the terms of the collective bargaining agreement (CBA), which was ratified between the league and players in May 2019, all players under contract would be eligible to pursue NFL opportunities for a specified period of time during the offseason. However, the CFL and NFL are not able to come to an agreement on the parameters of this process. The CFL wants all players who do not make the final 53-man NFL rosters to return to their parent CFL club. The NFL however, wants to be able to place these potential CFL Transfer Window players on their practice rosters. At present only players who are not under contract are eligible to work out for, or sign with an NFL team. However, as a show of good-faith many teams granted their players a release from their contracts so they could pursue NFL opportunities.

=== Global players ===
Following their introduction in the 2019 season, the league had two active roster spots for players designated as "global" players for each team. Each team also had up to three spots on their practice rosters for global players. Global players are defined as those who do not hold Canadian or American citizenship nor do they qualify as a National player in any other way.

=== Global combines ===
The league featured international combines to allocate designated global players to CFL rosters. The league held the first of these scouting combines in Finland and Sweden on January 11 and 12 respectively. In the following week, on January 17, a scouting combine took place in Paris. Additional combines were announced on November 5, 2019, to be held in a total of seven different countries and spanning three months. As of February 29, 11 total combines were scheduled with additional combines added in Sweden, Denmark, Brazil, and another in Japan. The combine in Mexico was cancelled due to the COVID-19 pandemic. The players were evaluated by CFL head office staff and the Director of Global Scouting, Greg Quick. The top players identified were intended to be invited to the CFL National Combine in Toronto which was scheduled to take place from March 26 to 28. However, due to the COVID-19 pandemic, the combine was cancelled. All of the participating global players were eligible to be selected in the 2020 CFL Global Draft with the date to be rescheduled (originally planned for April 16). The order of the draft followed the same waiver priority as the CFL National Draft (reverse 2019 standings with Grey Cup participants picking last) as opposed to the lottery systems from the previous year's separate LFA and European drafts.

Date	Location	Player origins	Partnering League/Association
January 11	Helsinki, Finland	Scandinavia, Northern Europe	American Football Association of Finland
January 12	Norrköping, Sweden	Scandinavia, Northern Europe	Swedish American Football Federation
January 17	Paris, France	France	French American Football Federation
January 25	Florence, Italy	Italy	Federazione Italiana di American Football
January 25	Bristol, England	United Kingdom	British American Football Association
January 26	Frankfurt, Germany	Germany, Austria and GFL players	German Football League
February 1	Tokyo, Japan	Japan	Japan National Football Association
February 2	Osaka, Japan	Japan	Japan National Football Association
February 29	Copenhagen, Denmark	Scandinavia, Northern Europe	Danish American Football Federation
March 7	Belo Horizonte, Brazil	Brazil	Confederação Brasileira de Futebol Americano
March 14–15	Mexico City, Mexico	Mexico	Liga de Fútbol Americano Profesional

=== Coaching changes ===
Team	2019 HC	2020 HC	Notes
Ottawa Redblacks	Rick Campbell	Paul LaPolice	On November 4, 2019, head coach Rick Campbell and the Ottawa Redblacks announced that they were parting ways with Campbell having one year left on his contract. Campbell had been the team's only coach since their inaugural season in 2014, but the team struggled in 2019 after losing many star veteran players and their offensive coordinator shortly before the season began. On December 7, 2019, the Redblacks announced that they had hired Paul LaPolice as their head coach. LaPolice has been coaching with four different CFL teams since joining the league in 2000, and had been the head coach of the Winnipeg Blue Bombers from 2010 to 2012 (16–28 record, 1–1 in the playoffs).
BC Lions	DeVone Claybrooks	Rick Campbell	On November 6, 2019, the BC Lions announced that DeVone Claybrooks had been relieved of his head coaching duties for the team. Claybrooks completed his first season as head coach of the team in 2019, leading the Lions to a disappointing 5–13 record, including a 0–10 record within the West Division. On December 2, 2019, the Lions announced Rick Campbell as the team's 27th head coach. Campbell had spent the previous six seasons as the head coach of the Ottawa Redblacks.
Edmonton	Jason Maas	Scott Milanovich	After much deliberation and speculation, the Edmonton Eskimos announced on November 27, 2019, that Jason Maas had been relieved as head coach of the team. Maas had spent four years with the team, compiling a 39–33 record and a 3–3 record in the playoffs. However, the team was perceived to have underachieved in the regular season by finishing no higher than third place during his tenure and missing the playoffs in 2018. In the middle of December Scott Milanovich agreed to terms with the Edmonton Eskimos to become their 22nd head coach. Most recently Milanovich had been the quarterbacks coach for the Jacksonville Jaguars (NFL) for the previous three seasons, prior to which he was the head coach of the Toronto Argonauts from 2012 through 2016 (43–47 record), leading the Argos to victory in the 100th Grey Cup.
Toronto Argonauts	Corey Chamblin	Ryan Dinwiddie	After a lengthy review of the coaching staff, it was announced on December 12, 2019, that Corey Chamblin had been relieved of his duties and that Ryan Dinwiddie was hired as the team's head coach. This was Dinwiddie's first head coaching position after serving as the quarterbacks coach for the Calgary Stampeders from 2016 to 2019.

== See also ==
- Impact of the COVID-19 pandemic on sports
- 2004–05 NHL lockout
- 2020 NCAA Division I men's basketball tournament
- 1994 World Series
