= Expansion of major sports leagues in the United States and Canada =

Addition of teams to North American sports leagues

The expansion of major sports leagues in the United States and Canada has occurred throughout the twentieth century for all of the major professional sports leagues in those two countries.

Cities that no longer host major professional teams, but formerly hosted basketball (in red), football (in blue), hockey (in orange), or baseball teams (in yellow). Cities that hosted teams from multiple sports have a green marker.

== United States ==
Professional sports leagues as known today evolved during the decades between the Civil War and World War II, when the railroad was the main means of intercity transportation. As a result, virtually all major league teams were concentrated in the northeastern quarter of the United States, within roughly the radius of a day-long train ride. No MLB teams existed south or west of St. Louis, the NFL was confined to the Great Lakes and the Northeast, and the NBA's 1946 launch spanned only from St. Louis to Boston. The NHL remained confined to six cities in the Northeast, Great Lakes and eastern Canada until 1967, though in the 1910s and 1920s, teams from its predecessor league had contested the Stanley Cup at season's end with teams from western Canada and the Pacific Northwest. College, minor league and amateur teams existed from coast to coast in all four sports, but rarely played outside of their home region for regular season games. Early professional soccer activity was concentrated almost entirely on an East Coast corridor from Baltimore to Boston, though a series of leagues located solely within the St. Louis metropolitan area also served as de facto major leagues for periods.

As travel and settlement patterns changed, so did the geography of professional sports. With the arguable exception of the western hockey teams which competed for the Stanley Cup in the early 20th century and the independent Los Angeles Bulldogs football team of the 1930s and 1940s, there were no major league teams in the far west until after World War II. The first west coast major-league franchise was the NFL's Los Angeles Rams, who moved from Cleveland in 1946. The same year, the All-America Football Conference began play, with teams in Los Angeles and San Francisco, and the Miami Seahawks, who became the only southern-based major league franchise, although Louisville, Kentucky had previously had short-lived baseball and football teams. The San Francisco franchise would be one of three AAFC teams admitted to the NFL after the AAFC's demise in 1949. Baseball would not extend west until 1958 in the move of both New York-based National League franchises, the Brooklyn Dodgers and New York Giants. The NBA would follow in 1960 with the move of the Minneapolis Lakers to Los Angeles, while the NHL would not have a west coast presence until it doubled in size in 1967. With the exception of the Los Angeles Kings, the NHL's initial franchises in the Southern and Western United States were ultimately unsuccessful—teams in Oakland, Atlanta, Kansas City and Denver all relocated. From 1982 until 1991, the Kings were the only U.S.-based NHL franchise south of St. Louis and/or west of the Twin Cities, and even the St. Louis Blues required league action to prevent being relocated to Saskatchewan.

Since then, as newer, fast-growing Sunbelt areas such as Phoenix, Tampa, and Dallas became prominent, the major sports leagues have expanded or franchises have relocated to service these communities.

The NHL's national footprint is a relatively recent situation. Historically, the league was concentrated in the northeast, with no teams south of New York City or west of Chicago from 1935 until 1967. The league expanded its footprint westward in a 1967 expansion but, other than the unsuccessful Atlanta Flames, avoided the South until making a major expansion into the territory in the 1990s.

The CFL had a total of six teams in the United States over a three-year period between 1993 and 1995, all in medium-sized markets that lacked an NFL team at the time (of the six markets, three had other major league franchises at the time), and played occasional games in the United States in the 1950s and 1960s.

== Canada ==
=== NHL ===
The National Hockey League was established in 1917 in Canada with four hockey clubs in three Canadian cities (Toronto, Montreal and Ottawa). The first American club, based in Boston, joined the league in 1924, but American hockey clubs had existed before the NHL expanded into the United States. The first US-based club to compete for the Stanley Cup was the Portland Rosebuds of the Pacific Coast Hockey League, who lost the 1916 series to the Montreal Canadiens (then of the National Hockey Association). The next year, the PCHA's Seattle Metropolitans took the Cup away from the Canadiens. The Boston Bruins are the oldest US-based franchise in the NHL, having played in the league since 1924. When the WHA and NHL merged, the NHL inherited teams in three Canadian cities, Edmonton, Winnipeg and Quebec City. However, of these three teams, only the Edmonton Oilers remain in their original city, or in Canada—the other two teams relocated to the U.S. in the 1990s. (Winnipeg's current NHL team was originally based in Atlanta before moving north in 2011.)

The NHL has been the dominant professional sports league in Canada, and was first established in Canada in 1917. Some US-based leagues, like MLB, MLS, and the NBA, have awarded franchises to Canadian cities, though outside of Toronto most teams have been unsuccessful.

The NHL was initially based entirely in eastern Canada, with teams in Toronto, Montreal, Ottawa, Hamilton and Quebec City; by 1925, Hamilton and Quebec City no longer had NHL teams, while Ottawa would leave in 1934, by which point American teams were slowly being added. The first Canadian expansion team would come in 1970 with a team in Vancouver; the NHL later added teams in Edmonton, Winnipeg and Quebec City (through absorption of WHA franchises), Calgary (via relocation from Atlanta) and Ottawa (via expansion) to go with the still-extant Toronto and Montreal teams. The distinctive place hockey holds in Canadian culture allowed these franchises to compete with teams in larger cities for some time. However, the teams in Winnipeg and Quebec City were eventually moved to larger media markets in the U.S., respectively Phoenix and Denver. The NHL's Canadian teams benefited greatly from the rise of the Canadian dollar to parity with its U.S. counterpart in the early 2010s, mainly because they collect most of their revenues in Canadian dollars but pay their player salaries in U.S. dollars. As a result, the NHL returned to Winnipeg for the 2011–12 season, with the Atlanta Thrashers relocating to become the newest version of the Winnipeg Jets. Since then, however, the Canadian dollar has weakened considerably against the U.S. dollar. There has been discussion of potential relocation to Quebec and, at least on a part-time basis, to Saskatoon in the future; while there have been efforts to bring an NHL team to Hamilton or suburban Toronto, the league currently opposes those efforts and has actively blocked efforts to relocate teams to Hamilton. In addition to full-time teams, the NHL, through its Kraft Hockeyville promotion, hosts a preseason game in a select small town each year.

=== CFL ===
The Canadian Football League has teams in all seven current NHL markets, in addition to Hamilton, Ontario, and Regina, Saskatchewan. Regina is considered a regional franchise and also represents Saskatoon as well as the rest of the province of Saskatchewan. At least eight of these nine markets have hosted CFL teams every year since the league's officially listed inception in 1958, and no other Canadian market has ever had a CFL team of its own. The CFL has broadened its footprint through one-off games. Regular season games were held in Canada's maritime provinces, under the name Touchdown Atlantic, from 2010 to 2013; the league had awarded the Atlantic Schooners in the early 1980s to an ownership group in Halifax, but the team could not secure a large enough stadium to field a CFL team, and the expansion was canceled. All of the regular-season Touchdown Atlantic games were held at Moncton Stadium in Moncton, New Brunswick, the largest stadium in the Maritimes but one of marginal CFL capacity; preseason games have previously been held at the smaller Canada Games Stadium in Saint John and Huskies Stadium in Halifax. The CFL is the only major league that has ever had a presence in the Maritimes; it suspended its maritime operations after 2013 because of declining attendance. In 2015, the CFL commenced Northern Kickoff, originally slated to be one preseason game and later expanded to a regular-season game as well, both of which were played in Fort McMurray, an oil sands boomtown with a metro area population of less than 70,000, by far the smallest market to host major professional football in the modern era. (Fort McMurray is in close proximity to Edmonton, which, in a similar manner to the Green Bay Packers in the United States, was expected to boost attendance, but the Northern Kickoff was largely a failure, with fewer than 5,000 fans attending the regular-season game.)

=== NFL ===
The NFL is the only one of the major leagues to not have any teams based in any Canadian city; the closest teams to Canada are the Buffalo Bills, whose stadium is located 21 kilometres (13 mi) south of the Canada–US border, and the Detroit Lions, whose stadium is located 2 kilometres (1.2 mi) from Windsor, Ontario. Both border teams consider portions of Southern Ontario part of their markets, with the Lions drawing from Southwestern Ontario and the Bills from the Golden Horseshoe, which includes Toronto and Hamilton. Likewise, the Seattle Seahawks consider the province of British Columbia part of its market; roughly 10 percent of the team’s season ticket holders are from the Lower Mainland of the province and three AM radio stations in Vancouver, Victoria and Kelowna are part of the Seahawks’ radio network. The team’s signature 12th Man flag was also once raised in Vancouver and Victoria prior to Super Bowl XLVIII, which was won by the Seahawks, defeating the Denver Broncos.

In the 1950s and 1960s, selected NFL teams would travel north to Canada to play a CFL team in pre-season interleague games (as did the Bills, at the time in the American Football League). From 2008–13 the Bills played one regular-season game each year and sporadic pre-season games in Toronto. The Bills were drawing about 15,000 Canadian fans per game during the time the Toronto Series ran, and the Bills' then-owner, Ralph Wilson, saw Toronto's corporate market as key to securing the franchise's future; the Bills have effectively maxed out their revenue potential in the economically struggling Western New York region. (Wilson's successor, Terry Pegula, canceled the Bills' Toronto games). The league also has agreements with the CFL that date to the 1990s regarding the honoring of player contracts.

In 2021, the NFL announced that they were planning on holding more regular season games outside of the United States in the near future, with Canada being one of the countries they were hoping to hold a game in, in addition to increasing the regular season schedule from 16 games to 17 games for each of its member franchises. Representatives of Olympic Stadium in Montreal and of BC Place in Vancouver — both venues have had experience hosting NFL preseason games in the past, with Montreal hosting games in 1988 and 1990 and Vancouver hosting one in 1998 — expressed a desire to host a regular season game down the road shortly after the announcement was made.

=== Other leagues ===
The first Major League Baseball team in Canada was the Montreal Expos who began play in 1969. In 2005, they moved to Washington, D.C. and became the Washington Nationals. The Toronto Blue Jays, who began play in 1977, became the first team outside the United States to win the World Series in 1992 and 1993.

Major League Soccer's first Canadian team was Toronto FC, which was added in 2007; it was soon followed by the Montreal Impact and Vancouver Whitecaps.

The Toronto Huskies were a charter member of the Basketball Association of America (the forerunner of the NBA), but they only played in the league's inaugural 1946–47 season, folding during the 1947 offseason. The NBA returned to Toronto in 1995 when the Raptors joined the league. That same year, the Vancouver Grizzlies began play, but moved to Memphis in 2001.

== International expansion ==
Some of the Big Four sports leagues have looked to expand their revenues by playing overseas games in attempt to develop a wider international fan base.

=== NFL ===
American football is the member of the top four major league sports with the least international exposure. The NFL has attempted to promote its game worldwide by scheduling selected pre-season games since 1976 in Mexico, Europe, Australia, and Japan. The NFL had promoted the game abroad through NFL Europe, but that league was never profitable and ceased operations in 2007.

In 2005, the NFL held its first regular-season game outside the United States. The matchup in Mexico City between the San Francisco 49ers and Arizona Cardinals drew a crowd of over 103,000 to Azteca Stadium (a 1994 crowd of over 112,000 at Azteca Stadium is the largest to attend a pre-season game).

The NFL then began its International Series, holding at least one regular-season game at Wembley Stadium in London every year since 2007. Preliminary talks to expand the NFL season with each team playing one game overseas was curtailed because the expansion was not approved in labor negotiations. The 2013 season was the first of four years in which the Jacksonville Jaguars played one home game at Wembley Stadium, and the league held a second game that did not involve the Jaguars at Wembley in 2013. Jaguars owner Shahid Khan purchased London-based soccer club Fulham, at the time in the Premier League, in July 2013.

In October 2013, the NFL announced that three games would be played at Wembley in the 2014 season, with the Atlanta Falcons and Oakland Raiders joining the Jaguars in taking a home game to London. The league openly acknowledged "that all three franchises are dissatisfied with their current stadium situations", although it noted that the Falcons were preparing to build a new stadium in Atlanta.

=== Other leagues ===
There has been increasing cooperation between the NBA and the Euroleague. In 2005, the two bodies agreed to organize a summer competition known as the NBA Europe Live Tour featuring four NBA teams and four Euroleague clubs, with the first competition taking place in 2006. The NBA has also started to play several regular season games outside of North America. MLB and the NHL have also begun to start playing more regular season games outside of North America.

== See also ==
- List of American and Canadian cities by number of major professional sports teams
