= Eric Tillman =

Canadian football league executive (born 1957)

Personal information
- Born: July 24, 1957 (age 69); Jackson, Mississippi, U.S.

Career information
- College: Mississippi

Career history

Operations
- 1981: Houston Oilers (PR)
- 1982–1983: Montreal Concordes (PP)
- 1984–1992: Senior Bowl (ED)
- 1993–1994: BC Lions (GM)
- 1995–1996: WLAF (ED)
- 1997, 1999: Toronto Argonauts (GM)
- 2001–2004: Ottawa Renegades (GM)
- 2006–2009: Saskatchewan Roughriders (GM)
- 2010–2012: Edmonton Eskimos (GM)

Administrator (cont)
- 2013: Hamilton Tiger-Cats (Consultant)
- 2014–2015: Hamilton Tiger-Cats (Scout./PP)
- 2016–2018: Hamilton Tiger-Cats (GM)
- 2019–2023: Schooners Sports and Entertainment (VP)

Awards and highlights
- 3× Grey Cup champion (1994, 1997, 2007)

Eric Tillman (born July 24, 1957) is an American-born Canadian football executive who was general manager of the BC Lions (1993–94), Toronto Argonauts (1997, 1999), Ottawa Renegades (2002–04), Saskatchewan Roughriders (2006–2010), Edmonton Eskimos (2010–2012), and Hamilton Tiger-Cats (2016–2018). As a general manager, Tillman has won the Grey Cup three times (1994, 1997, and 2007). In addition to his career as an executive, Tillman has also worked as a CFL analyst for TSN, the CBC, and Rogers Sportsnet in 1998, 2000, and 2005.

== Early career ==
Tillman began his career as a football executive in 1981 as a member of the Houston Oilers' public relations department. The following year, he received his first job in the CFL when he became the player personnel director of the Montreal Concordes. From 1984 to 1993, Tillman served as executive director of the Senior Bowl, a game sponsored by National Football League designed to showcase top players graduating from United States colleges.

== BC Lions ==
From 1993 to 1995, Tillman was the general manager of the BC Lions. Tillman took over a team that went 3–15 in 1992. Under Tillman, the Lions posted a 31–22–1 record and upset the Baltimore Stallions in the 82nd Grey Cup. The Lions success came in spite of regular fighting between head coach Dave Ritchie and owner Bill Comrie and a lack of team harmony.

In 1995, Norton Herrick, a real estate developer from Orlando, Florida, announced plans to move the CFL's Las Vegas Posse to Tillman's hometown of Jackson, Mississippi. Tillman was to be the club's general manager, however plans fell through and the relocation did not take place and Tillman remained with BC.

== Toronto Argonauts ==
In November 1995, the World League of American Football named Tillman its director of football operations. Tillman, however preferred overseeing a single team so in 1997 he returned to the CFL as general manager of the Toronto Argonauts. That year, the Argonauts won the Grey Cup. However, Tillman and head coach Don Matthews had a tumultuous relationship. On March 1, 1998, Tillman officially departed the Argonauts. He then joined TSN as a football analyst. In 1999, Matthews left the Argonauts to become head coach of the Edmonton Eskimos and, after Wally Buono turned down an offer to become head coach and general manager, the Argos asked Tillman to return as GM. When the team was purchased by New York businessman Sherwood Schwarz after the 1999 season, Tillman was fired and replaced by Schwarz's cousin, J. I. Albrecht. After his dismissal, Tillman returned to TSN.

== Ottawa Renegades ==
On October 23, 2001, Tillman was named the first general manager of the expansion Ottawa Renegades. Ottawa won four games their inaugural season and seven games the following year. In 2004, the Renegades gave head coach Joe Paopao the title of director of football operations. Although Tillman was still technically general manager, Paopao was effectively general manager.

After leaving Ottawa, Tillman served as an analyst for the CBC and Rogers Sportsnet.

== Saskatchewan Roughriders ==
Part way through the 2006 CFL season, Tillman was hired as the Roughriders general manager after they fired long time GM Roy Shivers. He took over a team that had a tarnished reputation in the community after several players had run-ins with the law, including former linebacker Trevis Smith, who had been charged with two counts of aggravated sexual assault after he knowingly exposed two women to HIV without telling them. Tillman promised to clean up the team's image and the Roughriders adopted a code of conduct which required players to obey the law, act with honesty and integrity, respect others, and take responsibility for their actions. During Tillman's three years with the team they hosted three consecutive home playoff games and played in two Grey Cups. In 2007, the Roughriders won their third ever Grey Cup. Among the key signings made by Tillman were head coach Kent Austin, defensive end Stevie Baggs, receivers Weston Dressler and Rob Bagg, defensive back Omarr Morgan, and running back Corey Holmes. He also acquired many key players who would be part of the Roughriders 2013 championship season, including Darian Durant, Chris Getzlaf, and John Chick. In July 2008, Tillman was given a contract extension through 2010.

On August 6, 2008, Tillman was sent home from a team board meeting because he was acting strangely. After he arrived home, Tillman put his hands on the hips of his children's sixteen-year-old babysitter. Tillman's attorney would state that Tillman was not thinking clearly because he had taken a double dose of sleep aids and pain medication for a sore back and that he did not remember what happened. On January 27, 2009, Tillman was charged with summary sexual assault. He was placed on paid administrative leave by the Roughriders on February 2, 2009.

Tillman pleaded guilty to the charge on January 4, 2010, the day his trial on this summary offence was to begin. He was granted an absolute discharge the following day and subsequently received no criminal record but was fined $50.00. Judge Murray Hinds stated that Tillman was "genuinely remorseful [and] in this case there's no suggestion that Mr. Tillman is not generally of good character. He has no prior criminal record. His behaviour towards [the teenage girl] on Aug. 6 appears to be an aberration fuelled by his consumption of two non-prescription drugs." On January 8, 2010, he resigned from his position as the Roughriders' general manager.

== Edmonton Eskimos ==
On September 14, 2010, Tillman was hired as general manager of the Edmonton Eskimos. He took over an Eskimos team that had a league-worst 2-8 record. Tillman stated that his primary goal would be improving the team's Canadian players. According to Eskimos president Rick LeLacheur, the team received a "substantial" number of phone calls from fans opposed to hiring Tillman, however, the Eskimos organization had deemed him worthy of a second chance. After Tillman's hiring, the Eskimos won five out of its eight remaining games and finished out of the playoffs by only two points.

In Tillman's first full season with the team, the Eskimos finished with an 11–7 record, which tied them with the Calgary Stampeders and BC Lions for first place in the West. Edmonton defeated Calgary 33–19 in the West Semifinal, but lost to BC 40–23 in the West Final.

On December 12, 2011, Tillman traded quarterback Ricky Ray to the Toronto Argonauts for quarterback Steven Jyles, kicker Grant Shaw, and a first-round pick. The move would be criticized as Jyles struggled at quarterback for the Eskimos while Ray led the Argonauts to victory in the 100th Grey Cup.

In 2012, the Eskimos finished fourth in West, with a 7–11 record. The team struggled offensively throughout the season and started three quarterbacks Jyles, Kerry Joseph, and Matt Nichols. Edmonton lost its final three games but was able to make the playoffs due to the crossover rule. On November 3, 2012, eight days before the Eskimos playoff game against the Toronto Argonauts, Eskimos president Len Rhodes announced that Tillman had been fired. Rhodes stated that there "no specific reason" as to why Tillman was fired, but he did point to Tillman's lack of presence in the community as an issue.

== Hamilton Tiger-Cats ==
Two months after his dismissal, the Hamilton Tiger-Cats hired Tillman as a consultant. His position was described by head coach/general manager Kent Austin as being a "sounding board" for Austin. In 2014 Tillman was given the title of director of U.S. scouting and U.S. pro personnel. In 2016, he was promoted to general manager, with Austin remaining as vice-president of football operations and head coach. The Ticats announced on January 3, 2019, that Tillman would not be returning as general manager. He had a 21–33 record with Hamilton as GM.

== Atlantic Schooners ==
After Tillman's contract with the Tiger-Cats expired in December 2018 he elected to leave the team and join Schooners Sports and Entertainment, a group seeking a CFL expansion team, as vice president of football operations. On March 15, 2023, TSN reporter Dave Naylor revealed that Schooner Sports and Entertainment (SSE) "is no longer involved in pursuing a team for Atlantic Canada".

== CFL GM record ==
Team	Year	Regular season					Postseason		
Team	Year	Won	Lost	Ties	Win %	Finish	Won	Lost	Result
BC	1993	10	8	0	.556	4th in West Division	0	1	Lost in West Semi-Final
BC	1994	11	6	1	.611	3rd in West Division	3	0	Won 82nd Grey Cup
BC	1995	10	8	0	.556	3rd in North Division	0	1	Lost in North Semi-Final
TOR	1997	15	3	0	.833	1st in East Division	2	0	Won 85th Grey Cup
TOR	1999	9	9	0	.500	3rd in East Division	0	1	Lost in East Semi-Final
OTT	2002	4	14	0	.222	4th in East Division	-	-	Missed playoffs
OTT	2003	7	11	0	.389	3rd in East Division	-	-	Missed playoffs
SSK	2006	5	4	0	.556	3rd in West Division	1	1	Lost in West Final
SSK	2007	12	6	0	.667	2nd in West Division	3	0	Won 95th Grey Cup
SSK	2008	12	6	0	.667	2nd in West Division	0	1	Lost in West Semi-Final
SSK	2009	10	7	1	.556	1st in West Division	1	1	Lost in 97th Grey Cup
EDM	2010	5	3	0	.625	4th in West Division	-	-	Missed playoffs
EDM	2011	11	7	0	.611	2nd in West Division	1	1	Lost in West Final
EDM	2012	7	11	0	.389	4th in West Division	-	-	Fired During Playoffs
HAM	2016	7	11	0	.389	2nd in East Division	0	1	Lost in East Semi-Final
HAM	2017	6	12	0	.333	3rd in East Division	-	-	Missed playoffs
HAM	2018	8	10	0	.444	2nd in East Division	1	1	Lost in East Final
Total		149	136	2	.523	2 Division; Championships	12	9	3 Grey Cups
