= Schooners Sports and Entertainment =

Proposed CFL expansion franchise

Atlantic Schooners
Logo

General information
- Founded: 2020s (planned)
- Folded: 2023 (Abandoned)
- Headquartered: Halifax, Nova Scotia, Canada (planned)

Personnel
- Owners: Schooners Sports and Entertainment

League / conference affiliations
- Canadian Football League; East Division (planned)

Schooners Sports and Entertainment was a sports ownership group that was previously in negotiations with the Canadian Football League (CFL) for an expansion team that was expected to begin play sometime in the 2020s as the Atlantic Schooners. Had the team taken the field, it might have begun playing in Moncton, New Brunswick, before moving into a new stadium in the Dartmouth community of Halifax, Nova Scotia. The prospective team had the same name as a conditional CFL franchise that was granted by the league in 1982 only to fold the following year without playing a game. As with the original Schooners franchise, the most significant impediment to this application was the inability to secure funding for a new stadium. On March 15, 2023, TSN reporter Dave Naylor revealed that Schooner Sports and Entertainment (SSE) "is no longer involved in pursuing a team for Atlantic Canada".

== History ==
=== 2017 ===
In November, the CFL conducted discussions with a group in Halifax interested in securing a franchise for the city; the group made a "very credible" pitch to the CFL head office. According to TSN analyst Dave Naylor the group consists of Anthony LeBlanc (former president and CEO of the NHL's Arizona Coyotes), Bruce Bowser (president of AMJ Campbell Van Lines) and Gary Drummond (former president of hockey operations for the Coyotes).

=== 2018 ===
In June, the ownership group, which was then named Maritime Football Ltd., met with Premier of New Brunswick Brian Gallant and Moncton mayor Dawn Arnold, to discuss the possibility of a Halifax team playing some games in Moncton. Later that month, the group met with the Halifax Regional Council in private about plans to bring a CFL team to Halifax, with the possibility of playing at Université de Moncton while a stadium in Halifax is being built. The possible stadium locations were narrowed down to two sites, in Dartmouth Crossing and Bayers Lake Business Park. It was then revealed that the Maritime Football Ltd. ownership group preferred the Shannon Park location in Dartmouth, Nova Scotia to develop a new stadium. The stadium was estimated to cost between $170 and $190 million and would seat 24,000 and have a business model similar to the Ottawa Redblacks, who entered the league in 2014.

On October 30, Halifax City Council unanimously voted in favour of proceeding with a business case analysis of a stadium in the Halifax municipality. Following this positive momentum, Maritime Football Ltd. and CFL commissioner Randy Ambrosie announced that the group would proceed with a season ticket drive to further gauge interest in addition to running a team name contest in the hopes of making an announcement on the team name just prior to the 106th Grey Cup game. The target year for the proposed team to enter the league was 2021, with the team name including the word 'Atlantic', but no franchise was actually awarded in this announcement. Further to the previous discussions with Moncton and New Brunswick politicians, it was also suggested that the potential new franchise could begin play at Croix-Bleue Medavie Stadium in Moncton, which has previously hosted CFL matches, while the stadium in Halifax is built.

On November 23, two days before the 106th Grey Cup, Maritime Football Ltd. and commissioner Ambrosie announced the new team would be called the 'Atlantic Schooners', the same name adopted by the ill-fated conditional franchise of the early 1980s that folded without playing a game. At that time the Maritime Football Ltd. partnership changed their name to Schooners Sports and Entertainment (SSE). By December 21, the SSE had sold over 6,000 season ticket deposits.

=== 2019 ===
In early February, it was revealed the proposed stadium budget of $180 million had been scaled back to $130 million, reducing the extravagance of the design to a simple stadium which could be improved in future renovations. In late September 2019, the SSE and the Halifax Regional Municipality (HRM) revealed the final plans for the stadium, with a price tag of $94 million plus the purchasing of the land valued at $10 million. The stadium was to include 24,000 seats, half of which were to be permanent. The planned completion date for construction was June 1, 2022. On October 22, the Halifax council voted 9–8 in favour of proceeding with the HRM staff preparing a review of the stadium proposal. Additionally, the timeline to deliver the report was accelerated from the spring of 2020 to December 2019. On December 6, the staff of the HRM recommended the rejection of the proposed Shannon Park location in Dartmouth, Nova Scotia, citing a lack of transportation infrastructure. The report did, however, recommend offering a one-time payment of $20 million once a potential stadium at a different location is near completion. On December 10, the Halifax Regional Council voted 10–7 in favour of approving $20 million in conditional funding for the stadium elsewhere in the city.

=== 2020 ===
Following the Halifax Regional Council decision to approve funding based on alternate sites, locations near Dartmouth Crossing, Bayers Lake, Halifax Stanfield International Airport, Exhibition Park, the Bedford Commons and Woodside were under review in early 2020. SSE had also stated that proximity to a 100-series highway and transit routes were a necessity for a location. However, due to the COVID-19 pandemic, much of the discussion and work was on pause as the country was locked down and efforts were diverted to more urgent matters.

On April 20, it was announced that SSE's lead spokesperson, Anthony LeBlanc, had joined the National Hockey League's Ottawa Senators as the team's president of business operations. It was reported that LeBlanc would remain with SSE in a smaller capacity and that Gary Drummond would assume his role as spokesperson. At this time, SSE had also stated that they had narrowed down their stadium locations to two, but did not comment on where. On August 17, after several initial delays, the CFL fully cancelled the 2020 season, further setting back progress made through the planned 2020 Touchdown Atlantic game in Halifax. Multiple city council members had stated that the priority was to navigate through the pandemic with the stadium placed on the back burner. With the delays, the team would not be operational until at least 2022 or 2023 with the intention of starting play temporarily at Huskies Stadium on the campus of Saint Mary's University or Croix-Bleue Medavie Stadium in Moncton while a stadium in Halifax was built.

=== 2021 ===
In early 2021, the Halifax Regional Municipality council decided to discontinue work on the stadium funding project indefinitely. According to councilor Lisa Blackburn the decision was made because "there has been no action or activity on the file for an extended period of time". SSE spokesman David Wallace said that COVID-19 had stalled the project's momentum, but the group still wants to build a stadium. During the 2021 State of the League address, Randy Ambrosie confirmed that the Schooners were still being worked on by the ownership group.

=== 2022 ===
In July 2022, SSE founding partner Gary Drummond told Murray McCormick of the Regina Leader-Post that the group did not have the "funding and the government participation that we require" and that it was "not in place because we just haven’t had an opportunity to meet with them". Another founding partner, Jim Stapleton, stated that "The stadium is actually where it all starts and ends for us" and that SSE could make a compelling case that a new stadium would be a positive for the area's economy "but we’ve got to get in front of those people [the government] to do so". The group chose not to participate in that year's Touchdown Atlantic festivities. In July 2022, Halifax mayor Michael Savage stated that "the idea of an outside the core of the city major stadium with 25,000 seats is nowhere, that’s just not on the books right now — there is no political appetite for it".

=== 2023 ===
In January 2023, CFL commissioner Randy Ambrosie proposed using a longer term temporary stadium in Halifax, such as the Wanderers Grounds, to house an expansion team. Two months later, CTV Atlantic reported that CFL executives had met with representatives from Saint Mary's University to discuss keeping the temporary stadium built for that year's Touchdown Atlantic intact long-term as a future home for a CFL team. On March 10, Ambrosie stated in a radio interview that he and CFL chief operating officer David Goldstein are "going to focus really hard on our expansion project". On March 15, TSN reporter Dave Naylor revealed that Schooner Sports and Entertainment (SSE) "is no longer involved in pursuing a team for Atlantic Canada".
