= John Huard =

American gridiron football player (1944–2025)

No. 57, 52, 32
- Position: Linebacker

Personal information
- Born: March 9, 1944; Waterville, Maine, U.S.
- Died: January 29, 2025 (aged 80); South Portland, Maine, U.S.
- Listed height: 6 ft 0 in (1.83 m)
- Listed weight: 228 lb (103 kg)

Career information
- High school: Waterville
- College: Maine (1964–1966)
- NFL draft: 1967: 5th round, 113th overall pick

Career history

Playing
- Denver Broncos (1967–1970); New Orleans Saints (1971–1972); New England Patriots (1972)*; Montreal Alouettes (1972–1973)
- * Offseason or practice squad member only

Coaching
- Maine (1974–1978) Offensive line coach; Acadia (1979–1983) Head coach; Chicago Blitz (1984) Special teams coach; Maine Maritime Academy (1987–1993) Head coach; Toronto Argonauts (2000) Head coach

Awards and highlights
- 2× First-team Little All-American (1965, 1966); Second-team All-East (1966)

Career NFL/AFL statistics
- Interceptions: 6
- Fumble recoveries: 1
- Stats at Pro Football Reference

Head coaching record
- Career: NCAA: 32–30 (.516); CFL: 1–6–1 (.188)
- College Football Hall of Fame

John Roland Huard (March 9, 1944 – January 29, 2025) was an American football player and coach. He played college football as a linebacker for the Maine Black Bears and was inducted into the College Football Hall of Fame. He played eight seasons of professional football (six in the National Football League and two in the Canadian Football League). Huard was the head football coach at Acadia University and the Maine Maritime Academy and was the head coach of CFL's Toronto Argonauts.

== Playing career ==
=== College ===
Huard played college football at the University of Maine for Black Bears from 1964 to 1966. He was a two-time first team Little All-America (1965, 1966) and helped lead the Black Bears to the 1965 Tangerine Bowl. He held the team records for most tackles in a season, most tackles in a single game, and longest interception return at the time of his graduation.

In 2003, Huard was the first player inducted into the "Ring of Honor" at Alfond Stadium. In 2014, he was the first Maine player elected to the College Football Hall of Fame in 2014.

=== AFL/NFL ===
Huard was selected 113th overall by the Denver Broncos in the fifth round of the 1967 NFL/AFL draft. He played three seasons for the Broncos, but missed all of 1970 due to a knee injury. While out of football, Huard worked as an ambassador for a trucking company and was an assistant to the Maine commissioner of economic development. In 1971, Denver traded Huard to the New Orleans Saints for an undisclosed draft pick. He was injured in the season opener and missed the rest of the season. He resigned with the Saints in 1972, but was released before the team's first preseason game. He then signed with the New England Patriots, but was released as part of the final cuts before the start of the regular season.

=== CFL ===
Following his release from the Patriots, Huard signed a multi-year contract with the CFL's Montreal Alouettes. Huard walked out of Alouettes training camp in 1973 and was placed on waivers. He was brought back to the team due to an injury to Junior Ah You. After four games, he was placed on the 30-day injury list with a pulled hamstring.

After unsuccessful negotiations with the Birmingham Americans of the World Football League, Huard announced his retirement.

== Coaching career ==
Huard began coaching in 1974 under Walter Abbott at Maine. In 1979, he became head coach of the Acadia Axemen. He led the team to two Vanier Cup championships (1979 and 1981).

In 1983, he was hired by J. I. Albrecht to coach the Atlantic Schooners expansion franchise. However, the team never played a game and Huard remained at Acadia for one more season before becoming the special teams coach of the Chicago Blitz of the United States Football League (USFL). In 1987, Huard was hired as head football coach of the Maine Maritime Academy. Huard coached the Mariners until 1994, when he was hired by former boss J. I. Albrecht to coach the CFL's expansion Shreveport Pirates. That June, before Shreveport had even played a game, Huard was fired by Pirates president Lonie Glieberman and replaced by Forrest Gregg. Glieberman cited "philosophical differences" as the reason for the change, however The Times reported that Huard may have been fired because of a walkout by team's medical training staff following a verbal altercation between Huard and a trainer.

In 2000, Huard was hired by Albrecht again, this time as head coach of the Toronto Argonauts. His tenure lasted eight games with a record of 1–6–1. He resigned after a 51–4 home loss to the British Columbia Lions.

== Later life ==
Huard was the northeast representative of FieldTurf and CEO of Northeast Turf of South Portland, Maine. He oversaw the installation of FieldTurf at Gillette Stadium during the 2006 NFL season.

Huard donated $20,000 towards the construction of University of Maine's Mahaney Dome and nearly $1 million towards renovations to Acadia University's Raymond Field.

Huard died on January 29, 2025, at the age of 80, at his home in South Portland.

== Head coaching record ==
=== College ===
Year	Team	Overall	Conference	Standing	Bowl/playoffs
Maine Maritime Mariners (New England Football Conference) (1987–1993)
1987	Maine Maritime	0–8	0–5	6th (North)	
1988	Maine Maritime	2–7	0–6	7th (North)	
1989	Maine Maritime	5–4	1–4	5th (North)	
1990	Maine Maritime	5–4	3–2	3rd (North)	
1991	Maine Maritime	5–3	3–2	T–2nd (North)	
1992	Maine Maritime	6–3	5–3	T–3rd	
1993	Maine Maritime	9–1	7–1	1st	W ECAC Bowl
Maine Maritime:		32–30	19–23		
Total:		32–30			
National championship Conference title Conference division title or championship game berth

=== CFL ===
Team	Year	Regular season					Postseason		
Team	Year	Won	Lost	Ties	Win %	Finish	Won	Lost	Result
TOR	2000	1	6	1	.143	4th in East Division	–	–	(fired)
