= Anthony LeBlanc =

Canadian sports executive

- Born: Baie-Comeau, Quebec, Canada
- Education: Lakehead University

Anthony LeBlanc is a Canadian sports executive who was the president, CEO, and alternate governor of the Arizona Coyotes of the National Hockey League from 2013 to 2017, the lead spokesman for Schooners Sports and Entertainment from 2017 to 2020, and president of business operations and alternate governor of the NHL's Ottawa Senators from 2020 to 2023.

== Early life and career ==
LeBlanc was born in Baie-Comeau and moved to Thunder Bay when he was ten years old. After graduating from Lakehead University in 1993, he moved to Fredericton, where he sold wireless products for Trinity Communications and later Cox Electronics. In 1997, he moved to Ottawa to work for the Corel Corporation.

In January 2000, LeBlanc joined Research In Motion (now BlackBerry Limited) as head of government solutions. By 2001, the BlackBerry was available on the General Services Administration schedule and within nine months the device was used by the White House Office, United States House of Representatives, and the U.S. departments of Defense and Health and Human Services. LeBlanc then served as the company's vice president of global sales, where he led a team that was responsible for direct interaction with RIM's largest clients. He left the company in 2008.

LeBlanc was the Progressive Conservative Party of Ontario candidate in Thunder Bay—Superior North in the 2011 Ontario general election. He finished a distant third behind Liberal incumbent Michael Gravelle and NDP candidate Steve Mantis.

== Sports ==
=== Arizona Coyotes ===
After leaving Research In Motion, LeBlanc sought to bring an Ontario Hockey League team to his home town of Thunder Bay. In 2009, he and his partners, Keith McCullough and Daryl Jones, decided to bid on the NHL's Phoenix Coyotes instead. In December 2009, the NHL announced that LeBlanc's group, Ice Edge Holdings, had signed a letter of intent with the league to purchase the Coyotes. Ice Edge would still have to negotiate a lease agreement with the city of Glendale, and get its ownership approved by the NHL Board of Governors. Ice Edge was unable to reach an agreement with city of Glendale and the group abandoned its bid for the time in August 2010.

On May 25, 2013, the NHL approved the sale of the Coyotes to Renaissance Sports & Entertainment (RS&E), a group of Canadian investors headed by Anthony LeBlanc and George Gosbee. On June 27, with no decision on a new deal with Glendale, the NHL Board of Governors approved the sale of the Coyotes franchise to RS&E and set a July 2 deadline for the City of Glendale to reach an arena deal with the RS&E group, or the team would be moved. On July 2, the Glendale City Council voted 4–3 to approve a 15-year lease agreement that would pay RS&E $15 million a year in "management fees" of Jobing.Com Arena. LeBlanc was named president, CEO, and alternate governor of the Coyotes, with Gosbee serving as executive chairman and governor. In 2014, the team changed its name to the Arizona Coyotes to reflect the fact that it was no longer located in Phoenix and to include all hockey fans in the state of Arizona. Later that year, Philadelphia-based hedge fund manager Andrew Barroway, who had recently failed in his attempt to purchase the New York Islanders, purchased controlling interest in the Coyotes. The deal was approved by the NHL Board of Governors on December 31, 2014. At the end of the 2016–17 season, Barroway bought out the rest of the ownership group and LeBlanc left the organization.

=== Schooners Sports and Entertainment ===
In 2017, LeBlanc led an ownership group that sought to bring a Canadian Football League expansion team to the Halifax, Nova Scotia area. In 2018, the group changed its name from Maritime Football Ltd. to Schooners Sports and Entertainment (SSE). By December 21, 2018, SSE had sold over 6,000 season ticket deposits. After LeBlanc was hired by the Senators, it was reported that Gary Drummond would assume the role of lead spokesperson for SSE and LeBlanc would remain involved in smaller capacity. On March 15, 2023, TSN reporter Dave Naylor revealed that SSE "is no longer involved in pursuing a team for Atlantic Canada".

=== Ottawa Senators ===
On April 20, 2020, Ottawa Senators owner Eugene Melnyk announced LeBlanc's hiring as the team's president of business operations. Eight months later, the team announced that LeBlanc had signed a long-term contract extension and was also named alternate governor. He resigned in 2023 after the team was purchased by Michael Andlauer.

== Electoral record ==
2011 Ontario general election
Party	Candidate	Votes	%	±%
Liberal	Michael Gravelle	11,765	45.00	-1.78
New Democratic	Steve Mantis	9,111	34.85	-3.41
Progressive Conservative	Anthony LeBlanc	4,578	17.51	+8.11
Green	Scot Kyle	555	2.12	-3.43
Libertarian	Tony Gallo	133	0.51	
Total valid votes		26,142	100.0	
Total rejected, unmarked and declined ballots		97	0.37	
Turnout		26,239	48.20	
Eligible voters		54,443		
Source: Elections Ontario

Sporting positions
Preceded by Jerry Moyes	Phoenix/Arizona Coyotes owner 2013–2017	Succeeded by Andrew Barroway
