= J. I. Albrecht =

American-Canadian executive (1931–2008)

J.I. Albrecht
Personal information
- Born: February 15, 1931; St. James, New York, U.S.
- Died: March 11, 2008 (aged 77); Toronto, Ontario, Canada

Career history
- 1970–1973: Montreal Alouettes
- 1984: Atlantic Schooners
- 1994: Shreveport Pirates
- 2000: Toronto Argonauts

Awards and highlights
- Named all-time general manager of the Alouettes by CFL Alumni Association (1993)

J. I. Albrecht (February 15, 1931 – March 11, 2008) was an American-Canadian executive who worked in college and professional sports for 53 years, notably as a general manager and several key director spots in the CFL. He also worked in NFL, NCAA, and NASL.

== Background ==
Albrecht was the son of wealthy New York businessman Herman Albrecht. Born in St. James, New York, Albrecht grew up in Long Island and Brooklyn and attended Erasmus Hall High School in Brooklyn. He went on to attend Georgia Military College where he lost an eye in an accident. Because of this, he decided to pursue the closest thing to war, which to him at the time was football.

=== Name ===
Albrecht has claimed over the years that his initials have stood for nothing. However, in an interview with the Ottawa Sun he revealed that they stand for Just Incredible. When he was born, he said, there were complications which led the delivering doctor to fear that he or his mother would die at his birth, and asked his father who he wanted to live, the baby or the mother. His father said "both." Both mother and son survived, and in commemoration the parents selected the unusual name. However, they were not allowed to use it on his birth certificate, and thus he went by his initials all his life.

== Early career ==
Albrecht went on to work under General Robert Neyland whom he named his second son, Hunter Joseph Neyland after. At the University of Tennessee he won his first national championship. He then went on to recruit for several other NCAA teams and served for one season as the general manager of the Harlem Globetrotters. Albrecht then worked for the Denver Broncos, San Francisco 49ers, Oakland Raiders, and the New England Patriots of the NFL. In Canada he worked for the Montreal Alouettes where he got his first Grey Cup as part of the 1970 team. He was fired by Sam Berger in Montreal and went to work for the New England Patriots of the NFL. After a few years with the Patriots during the Grogan - Plunkett years he was hired by Bill Hodgson, owner of the Old Mill in Toronto and the Toronto Argonauts to serve as the team's general manager. After the Argos he went on to be the general manager of the Toronto Metros Croatia where he developed a love and respect for the game of soccer and the Croatian people.

== Montreal Alouettes ==
Albrecht served as the general manager of the Montreal Alouettes during the 1970s and hired Marv Levy as head coach of the team. He guided the Alouettes to the Grey Cup championship in 1970, 1974, and 1977. He had a special love for the city of Montreal and his best friend, Herb Trawick, played for the Alouettes. Albrecht was named as the Montreal Alouettes all-time general manager for the 20th century in a fan vote. He brought many outstanding players to Montreal, many who were successful on the field, then as coaches and in business. Almost 40 years after their time in Montreal, many players still kept in touch with Albrecht. Players whom he recruited and signed include Wally Buono, Larry Smith, Junior Ah You, Gordon Judges, Steve Smear, Heisman Trophy winner Johnny Rodgers, Dan Yochum, & Ed George.

== Atlantic Schooners/Cape Breton ==
In 1984 Albrecht was granted a conditional expansion team to play out of Halifax, Nova Scotia. The Schooners folded before they played a single game because Albrecht's ownership group could not secure the financing for a new stadium. His main investor, RB Cameron pulled out after being unable to secure government financing for the stadium.

Albrecht had sunk several years into the project and fell in love with the city of Halifax, where he lived with his beloved dog Higgins, the English Bulldog who actually had his own article in the paper titled, "The World as Seen Through the Eyes of Higgins". He wrote in the paper, had a radio show, managed a radio station, and generally enjoyed life. It was in Halifax that he met his second wife Kathryn, who died of cancer a year after they separated. They moved together to Cape Breton where Albrecht took over the athletic director's job at the University College of Cape Breton where he launched the football program. The team started with just 21 players, where almost everyone played both ways. Albrecht brought in his lifelong friend George Brancato to coach the team. While at Cape Breton he brought in many players who went on to play professionally, such as George Nimako, Mark Pearce, and several others. Though the team was shelved after one year, won their last game of the season.

== Ottawa Rough Riders and Shreveport Pirates ==
Albrecht was a consultant/personnel director to the Ottawa Rough Riders during the 1992 and 1993 seasons. He later became the Executive Vice President of Football Operations for the Shreveport Pirates. John Huard, one of Albrecht's best friends, and former 2nd round draft pick at Denver, was hired by him as the head coach for the Pirates' inaugural season in 1994. However Huard was fired by team President Lonie Glieberman before coaching a single game. Huard and Albrecht later sued the Pirates. Quarterback Billy Joe Tolliver and the City of Shreveport also brought legal action against the team in separate suits.

== Toronto Argonauts ==
Albrecht came back to the team in 2000 when he was hired to be managing director of the Argos by new owner Sherwood Schwarz, his first cousin. His brief term was controversial. Huard, who had been fired by the Shreveport Pirates six years earlier, became Albrecht's first choice as the new head coach of the Toronto Argonauts. His quirky, abrasive style did not endear himself to many, and he resigned from his post after a 1-6-1 record culminating with a 51-4 loss to the B.C. Lions. Despite all the disasters, Albrecht did hire player Michael Clemons as head coach. The decision came after several hours of discussion with Schwarz and his son, Dean Albrecht, where the two decided that they should have a young insider to take over the team as head coach. His son tabled the names Paul Masotti and Pinball Clemons. The elder Albrecht was emphatic about hiring Clemons, and the decision was made. Although Albrecht indicated he had been given a 10-year contract, he was fired after a single year.

== Later life ==
Albrecht suffered a stroke in 2002 and spent the last year and a half of his life at a Toronto nursing home. After an article was written in both the Ottawa and Montreal papers, many of his old players publicly expressed their appreciation for what he had done for them in the past. He was working on his autobiography, entitled Just J.I: A Fisher Of Men and was seeking a publisher. Unfortunately, files he had been keeping for his autobiography were lost.

On March 8, 2008, Albrecht died at a Toronto nursing home at the age of 77.
