= Raymond Field =

Sports stadium on the campus of Acadia University

Coordinates: 45.0920805°N 64.3674159°W

- Interactive map of Raymond Field
- Location: Wolfville, Nova Scotia
- Owner: Acadia University
- Capacity: 3,000
- Surface: FieldTurf; 400m track

Construction
- Opened: 1966

Tenant
- Axemen and Axewomen (U Sports)

Raymond Field is a multi-purpose stadium in Wolfville, Nova Scotia. It is the home of the Acadia University Axemen football and soccer teams as well as the Acadia Axewomen soccer and rugby teams. It can seat 3,000 (5,000 with standing room), and was built in 1966. In 2007, the natural grass was replaced with FieldTurf and the running track was replaced with an 8-lane all-weather surface.
