= CFL Touchdown Series =

Neutral site Canadian Football League games in the Maritime Provinces

The CFL Touchdown Series (French: Série Touché LCF) is a series of neutral site Canadian Football League games played across Canada.

== Touchdown Atlantic ==

In 2003, the league had struck a committee to examine the feasibility of adding a tenth team, with the leading candidate cities being Quebec City and Halifax. Before the suspension of the Renegades, league commissioner Tom Wright had indicated that Halifax was the leading candidate for expansion. With the success of Touchdown Atlantic 2010, Moncton was also considered for CFL expansion. No Touchdown Atlantic was played from 2014 to 2018, but it returned in 2019 due to the renewed interest in an Atlantic expansion team.

=== Exhibition games ===

Prior to the official Touchdown Atlantic series, Saint John, New Brunswick, hosted a pair of exhibition games. In 1986, the Winnipeg Blue Bombers defeated the Montreal Alouettes 35–10 at Canada Games Stadium before a sellout crowd of 11,463 fans. The following year, the Alouettes returned to the Port City and lost 14–13 to the Hamilton Tiger-Cats; the Alouettes would fold a week later. An exhibition game between the Ottawa Renegades and Montreal was held in Quebec City in 2003 at PEPS Stadium, with the Alouettes winning 54–23 in front of 10,358.

The first game of the Touchdown Atlantic series was an exhibition pre-season match played in Halifax, Nova Scotia, at Huskies Stadium in June 2005. The game, between the Toronto Argonauts and the Hamilton Tiger-Cats, ended in a 16–16 tie. The game was to gauge Halifax's support for a potential CFL expansion team, which would likely be named the Schooners. Temporary seating was added to boost the capacity, and a sellout crowd of 11,148 attended. It was also used by the league to test its instant replay challenge system which was implemented in the 2006 CFL season.

A second game was to be played on June 3, 2006, at Halifax's Huskies Stadium, with temporary seating for a capacity of 11,000 fans. This game was canceled after the suspension of the Ottawa Renegades, who were scheduled to play the Montreal Alouettes.

=== Regular season games ===

In October 2009, it was officially announced that the Edmonton Eskimos would face the Toronto Argonauts in Moncton, New Brunswick, on September 26, 2010, in the first regular season game in Atlantic Canada. That game was referred to as Touchdown Atlantic. The game was played at the New Moncton Stadium on the campus of Université de Moncton in front of a reported sellout crowd of 20,725. Tickets went on sale to the general public on March 25, 2010, with a one-day pre-sale being conducted the day before. After 32 hours of being up for sale, the 2010 Touchdown Atlantic was announced as a sellout on March 25, 2010. The Eskimos won the game 24–6 thanks to their 247 interception return yards on six interceptions, the second most interception return yards in CFL history.

A 2011 Touchdown Atlantic game, somewhat erroneously known as Touchdown Atlantic II, took place during the 2011 CFL season, again in Moncton. The Hamilton Tiger-Cats were the designated home team and faced the Calgary Stampeders on September 25 at Moncton Stadium. Hamilton won the game, 55–36.

No Touchdown Atlantic was held in 2012. The 2013 edition of Touchdown Atlantic featured the Tiger-Cats hosting the Montreal Alouettes in Moncton on September 21. The game was held in Moncton due to their stadium in Hamilton being replaced; although Moncton attempted to have the Tiger-Cats play the whole season in Moncton, the team opted to only play one game there and have the rest of the season closer to Hamilton (specifically Guelph). Hamilton won the game 28–26.

No Touchdown Atlantic was held from 2014 to 2018 as the league lost momentum for the event. However, there was renewed interest in football in the Maritimes when a group of businessmen began discussions with the league for a franchise based in Halifax. While a stadium would still need to be built in Halifax, the discussions were legitimate enough for the league to encourage a season ticket campaign and led to the naming of the team as the Atlantic Schooners (the same as the proposed team from 1982). To promote interest in the event, a Touchdown Atlantic game was announced for 2019 with the event being hosted by this same group, Schooners Sports and Entertainment (SSE). The Argonauts were designated the home team and the Alouettes the visiting team. TSN's Dave Naylor reported that SSE was considering Halifax, Moncton, and Antigonish, Nova Scotia, as potential game sites, with Moncton being the eventual selection. Unlike the 2010–2013 versions, Moncton Stadium was not expanded to host the game, and a sellout crowd of only 10,126 watched as the Alouettes defeated the Argonauts (hosting the game in Moncton to avoid a short-notice conversion after Toronto FC hosted a home game the night before) on August 25, 2019.

On January 23, 2020, it was announced that the Saskatchewan Roughriders would play the Argonauts in a Touchdown Atlantic game that would be the first regular season game to be played in Halifax. The game was scheduled to be played at Huskies Stadium on the campus of Saint Mary's University, where temporary seating would have brought the seating capacity up to 10,000. However, the game was cancelled due to the COVID-19 pandemic.

While no game was scheduled in 2021 due to the pandemic, it was confirmed on March 24, 2022, that the Argonauts would host the Roughriders in Wolfville, Nova Scotia, at Raymond Field for the first Touchdown Atlantic game to be played in Wolfville. The series continued the following season with the Toronto Argonauts hosting the Saskatchewan Roughriders at Huskies Stadium (Saint Mary's University) in Halifax on Saturday, July 29, 2023. This was the first regular season game held in Halifax after the city hosted a pre-season match in 2005. In June 2023, the league announced the game had sold-out.

=== Potential for an Atlantic expansion team ===
The initial success of the Touchdown Atlantic games placed Moncton in the position of frontrunner for a Canadian Football League franchise in Atlantic Canada, according to commissioner Mark Cohon. Moncton is also well positioned because of its centralized location in the region; a team based in Moncton would represent all three maritime provinces due to the region's small population. Moncton officials negotiated to temporarily host the Tiger-Cats for the 2013 season while Ivor Wynne Stadium was demolished and Tim Hortons Field was under construction. However, citing a desire to be closer to home, the Tiger-Cats announced they would play eight of their nine home games at nearby Guelph, with the ninth being the Touchdown Atlantic contest.

By 2015, the potential for an expansion to the Maritimes had once again faded, in part due to Cohon's resignation and the failure to sell out the 2013 contest. Focus by this point had shifted to the Northern Kickoff contest at Shell Place in Fort McMurray, Alberta; it was here, rather than in Moncton, that the league chose to host regular season games that had been displaced because of the 2015 FIFA Women's World Cup or 2015 Pan American Games. Negotiations to bring a CFL team to the Maritimes resumed under the commission of Randy Ambrosie in 2017, with Halifax and Moncton considered as potential homes for the team.

== Touchdown Pacific ==
CFL Commissioner Randy Ambrosie said in December 2022 that the league was considering hosting other "Touchdown"-branded games in neutral markets outside of Atlantic Canada from 2024. Langford, British Columbia (part of Greater Victoria) was discussed as a potential location for a Touchdown Pacific game at Starlight Stadium beginning in 2024, but on November 29, 2023, it was confirmed that the BC Lions and Ottawa Redblacks would play at Royal Athletic Park in Victoria on August 31, 2024, part of the Labour Day weekend slate of games. Temporary seating was added to expand the capacity to 14,000. The Lions won 38–12, and the attendance was 14,727.

== Touchdown Kelowna ==
In November 2025, the CFL announced Touchdown Kelowna for the BC Lions, as the 2026 FIFA World Cup would be held at BC Place in June and July, and the team needed an alternate stadium. The team played two games at the Apple Bowl: on June 27 against the Calgary Stampeders and on July 4 against the Edmonton Elks.

== List of Touchdown branded games ==
Game	Date	Visitor	Score	Home	City	Stadium	Event	Attendance	Ref
Preseason	June 11, 2005	Hamilton Tiger-Cats	16–16	Toronto Argonauts	Halifax, NS	Huskies Stadium	Touchdown Atlantic	11,148	
Preseason	June 3, 2006	Montreal Alouettes	Cancelled	Ottawa Renegades	Halifax, NS	Huskies Stadium	Touchdown Atlantic	—	
Regular season	September 26, 2010	Edmonton Eskimos	24–6	Toronto Argonauts	Moncton, NB	Moncton Stadium	Touchdown Atlantic	20,725	
Regular season	September 25, 2011	Calgary Stampeders	36–55	Hamilton Tiger-Cats	Moncton, NB	Moncton Stadium	Touchdown Atlantic	20,153	
Regular season	September 21, 2013	Montreal Alouettes	26–28	Hamilton Tiger-Cats	Moncton, NB	Moncton Stadium	Touchdown Atlantic	15,123	
Regular season	August 25, 2019	Montreal Alouettes	28–22	Toronto Argonauts	Moncton, NB	Croix-Bleue Medavie Stadium	Touchdown Atlantic	10,126	
Regular season	July 25, 2020	Saskatchewan Roughriders	Cancelled	Toronto Argonauts	Halifax, NS	Huskies Stadium	Touchdown Atlantic	—	
Regular season	July 16, 2022	Saskatchewan Roughriders	24–30	Toronto Argonauts	Wolfville, NS	Raymond Field	Touchdown Atlantic	10,886	
Regular season	July 29, 2023	Saskatchewan Roughriders	13–31	Toronto Argonauts	Halifax, NS	Huskies Stadium	Touchdown Atlantic	11,555	
Regular season	August 31, 2024	Ottawa Redblacks	12–38	BC Lions	Victoria, BC	Royal Athletic Park	Touchdown Pacific	14,727	
Regular season	June 27, 2026	Calgary Stampeders	41-33	BC Lions	Kelowna, BC	Apple Bowl	Touchdown Kelowna	19,108	
Regular season	July 4, 2026	Edmonton Elks	24-36	BC Lions	Kelowna, BC	Apple Bowl	Touchdown Kelowna	19,083	

== See also ==
- List of neutral site Canadian Football League games
- Atlantic Schooners
