= Atlantic Schooners =

Proposed 1980s CFL expansion franchise

- Founded: 1982
- Folded: 1983
- Based in: Dartmouth, Nova Scotia, Canada
- League: Canadian Football League
- Colours: Silver, Maritime Blue, Nautical Brass, and white

Personnel
- Head coach: John Huard
- General manager: J. I. Albrecht
- Team president: John Donoval
- Owners: Maritime Professional Football Club Ltd. (Included John Donoval, J. I. Albrecht, and R. B. Cameron)

The Atlantic Schooners were a conditional Canadian Football League (CFL) expansion team that was to begin play in 1984 in Dartmouth, Nova Scotia. However, team ownership could not secure funding for a stadium and the franchise application was withdrawn 13 months after it had been submitted. The Atlantic Schooners name was revived in 2018 as the name of a proposed CFL expansion team.

== Franchise history ==
On May 13, 1982, Maritime Professional Football Club Ltd. was granted a conditional expansion franchise by the Canadian Football League's board of governors with unanimous approval. The team was to pay a $1.5 million expansion fee by May 1, 1983 and could begin play in 1984 if a suitable 30,000 seat stadium were built in time for the league opener that year. The ownership group was led by John Donoval, a Mississauga, Ontario truck executive, and J. I. Albrecht, former general manager of the Montreal Alouettes. Even before the franchise was officially awarded, Albrecht, who was working as a football consultant for Donoval, planned to hire Acadia Axemen head coach John Huard as the Schooners' first head coach. As expected, Huard was named as head coach on the same day that the franchise was awarded. Nova Scotia industrialist, Robert Burns Cameron joined the ownership group on August 30, 1982 and was reported to have invested over 50% into the group.

On November 3, 1982, the team name Atlantic Schooners was officially announced by Albrecht at a press conference in Halifax, Nova Scotia. It was selected based on a study followed by a name-the-team contest in which "schooner" was the winning selection. Other names that were considered by Donoval were Atlantic Windjammers and Atlantic Storm. The goal was to have a regional team that would represent all of Atlantic Canada. The logo was a stylized "A" in the shape of a schooner that rode on four waves, representing the four Maritime provinces of Nova Scotia, New Brunswick, Prince Edward Island, and Newfoundland which make up Atlantic Canada. The team colours were silver, maritime blue, nautical brass, and white.

An expansion draft was planned to be held following the 1983 CFL season where, initially, a maximum of 38 players from the existing nine member clubs would be used to form a roster. The actual formula was approved on November 24, 1982 by the CFL governors. Each of the nine existing clubs would be able to protect 10 imports and 10 non-imports from their final rosters from the 1983 season. The Schooners would then select two imports and two non-imports from each team for a maximum of 36 players. Each team could only protect one quarterback and the Schooners could draft a maximum of two in total. The draft would have taken place in January 1984.

The Schooners proposed home was a 34,000-seat stadium located on leased land in the city of Dartmouth, Nova Scotia, said to be built at a cost of $6 million. When the franchise was awarded, it was still being debated between the mayors of Halifax and Dartmouth where the new stadium should be built as both wanted the team in their respective cities. However, neither the provincial or federal government were willing to contribute to the funding of the stadium. As described by senator Ray Perrault, minister of state for fitness and amateur sport, federal funds were only made available when a city was hosting an international event, such as the Olympic Games or Commonwealth Games. The Premier of Nova Scotia, John Buchanan, also stated that no provincial funding would be made available in any circumstance. The ownership group had purchased a scoreboard from the New England Patriots' Sullivan Stadium for use in their new stadium.

Ultimately, the Schooners were unable to meet the deadlines set by the league, including the deadline for a financing plan for the new stadium. On June 16, 1983, Maritime Professional Football Club Ltd. withdrew their application for a franchise and refunded season ticket deposits. The ownership group's withdrawal came one day before the league deadline because Donoval believed that a withdrawal rather than league rejection would make re-applying for a franchise easier. However, another franchise application never came to fruition.

== See also ==
- Touchdown Atlantic
- Schooners Sports and Entertainment
- CFL Expansion
