= Croix-Bleue Medavie Stadium =

University track and field stadium in Moncton, New Brunswick, Canada

Stade Medavie Blue Cross Stadium
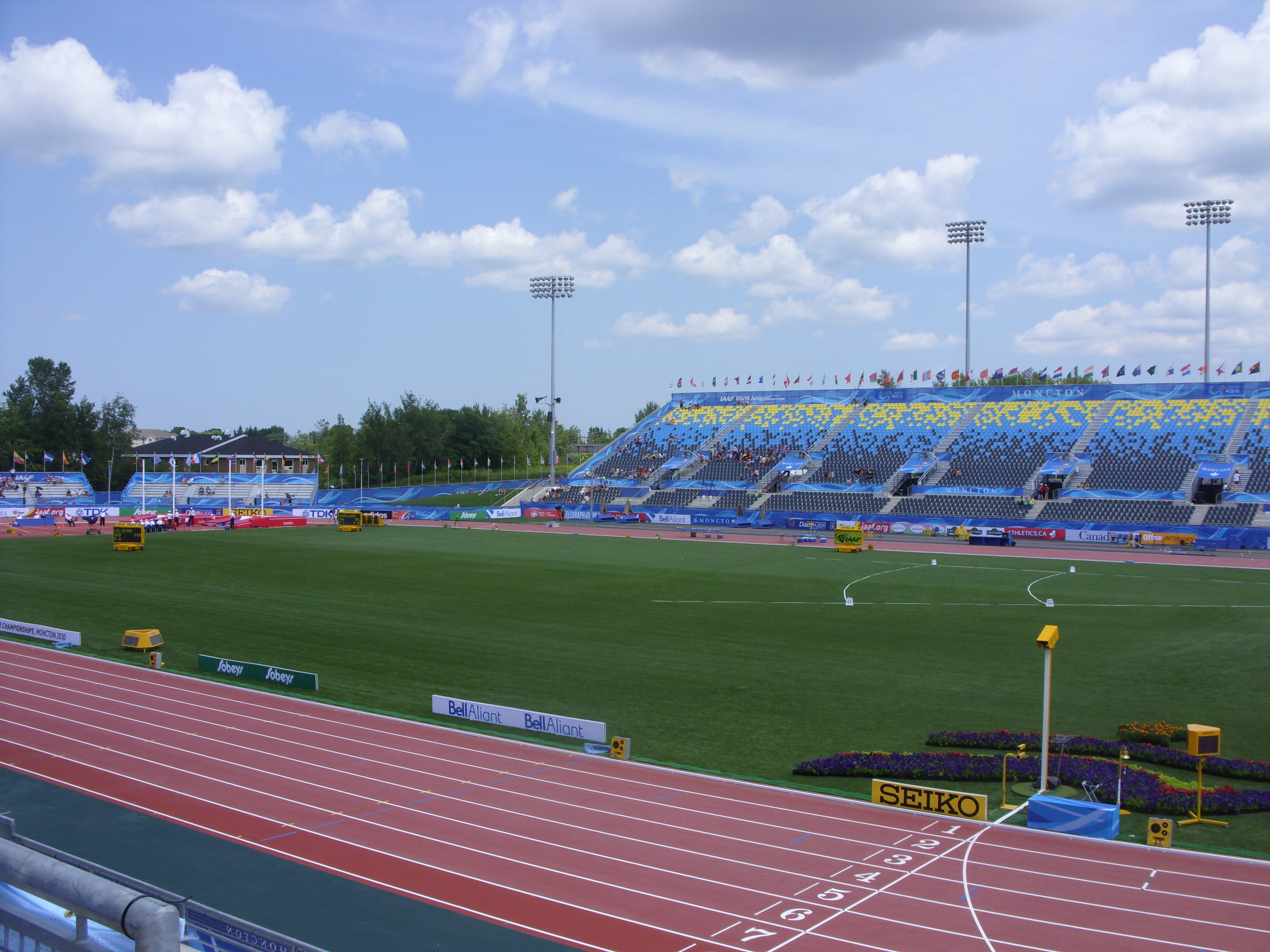
- Moncton Stadium just before the 2010 World Junior Championships in Athletics.
- Interactive map of Stade Medavie Blue Cross Stadium
- Former names: Moncton 2010 Stadium; Moncton Stadium
- Location: Moncton, New Brunswick, Canada
- Coordinates: 46°6′30″N 64°47′0″W
- Owner: Universite de Moncton and City of Moncton
- Operator: Universite de Moncton
- Capacity: 8,300 (expandable to 25,000)
- Surface: Natural grass (2010–2013); FieldTurf (2014–present)

Construction
- Groundbreaking: April 22, 2008
- Opened: July 19, 2010
- Cost: $17 – $27 million

Croix-Bleue Medavie Stadium (French: Stade Croix-Bleue Medavie), formerly Moncton Stadium (French: Stade Moncton), is a track and field stadium on the campus of the Université de Moncton in Moncton, New Brunswick, Canada, built to host the IAAF 2010 World Junior Championships in Athletics. The $17 million venue opened in 2010. Although seating capacity had fluctuated early in construction (original plans called for as many as 28,000 seats), the stadium has 8,300 permanent seats, and is expandable to 25,000 via temporary seating. It is the home field for the Moncton Aigles Bleus soccer teams.

== Construction ==
Construction by Acadian Construction began on April 22, 2009, and was completely finished in July 2010, just in time for the 2010 World Junior Championships in Athletics. Though the stadium was only completely finished in July, it was used on November 23, 2009, as the Vancouver 2010 Winter Olympic flame stayed there overnight.

The stadium was re-named to Stade Croix-Bleue Medavie Stadium on March 20, 2019, following a $1 million contribution by Medavie Blue Cross to support scholarships to student athletes in health science programs.

== CFL events ==
The facility has also been proposed as a potential venue for a future Canadian Football League (CFL) expansion team, but a significant expansion to 25,000 seats would be recommended. CFL Commissioner Mark Cohon said he wanted to see "neutral-site" regular season games played in the new Moncton Stadium by 2010. On February 1, 2010, it was announced that the Toronto Argonauts would play host to the Edmonton Eskimos in an event dubbed "Touchdown Atlantic" that took place on September 26, 2010. On February 18, 2011, it was announced that the Hamilton Tiger-Cats would play host to the Calgary Stampeders in an event dubbed "Touchdown Atlantic 2" that took place on September 25, 2011. As every CFL stadium had an artificial surface until 2016 (the Argonauts began playing on natural grass at BMO Field in that year), the Touchdown Atlantic game had been the only CFL game played all season on a grass surface, although a temporary strip of artificial turf must be laid over the track in order to accommodate the end zones.

== Other major events ==
The stadium plays host to numerous events during the year. Its state of the art track brings numerous track & field events to the stadium, including an annual youth competition for qualifying for the Canadian Youth Track and Field Championships. The stadium has also been used for university soccer games and has had the Olympic flame stay there overnight on November 23, 2009, during the torch relay for the 2010 Winter Olympics in Vancouver. During the Olympic flame's visit to Moncton, the attendance was only 12,000 due to the construction not being finished at the time.

On September 22, 2010, it was announced that the 2011, 2013, and 2015 Uteck Bowl would be played at Moncton Stadium due to the crumbling infrastructure of Huskies Stadium in Halifax, Nova Scotia. On November 12, 2012, it was announced that the AUS would cancel its Uteck Bowl partnership with the City of Moncton due to low attendance at the 2011 game.

On May 4, 2012, it was announced that Moncton would join Edmonton, Montreal, Ottawa, Vancouver, and Winnipeg in hosting the 2015 FIFA Women's World Cup, hosting 6 group stage matches and a round of 16 match. Moncton will also join Edmonton, Montreal and Toronto in hosting the 2014 FIFA U-20 Women's World Cup, hosting 6 group stage matches, a quarterfinal match and a semi-final match.

On May 20, 2016, it was announced on September 4, 2016, the stadium will host Atlantic Fest 2016 featuring Selena Gomez, DNCE, Flo Rida, Shawn Hook and Francesco Yates.

On February 21, 2023, it was announced that rock band Guns N' Roses will be playing on August 5, 2023, as part of their world tour, with opening act Carrie Underwood.

== Turf controversy ==
In order to host matches for the 2015 FIFA Women's World Cup, the stadium was required to remove the grass surface and replace it with artificial turf. The stadium paid $1.5 million for the conversion to FieldTurf and is paying an additional $500,000 to create a new grass surface adjacent to the stadium for use where the turf surface cannot be used due to safety concerns, such as Paralympic Track-and-field, prompting allegations of discrimination against Paralympic athletes.

A coalition of elite female players from around the world filed a lawsuit challenging FIFA’s decision to play the 2015 Women’s World Cup on artificial turf. Alleging gender discrimination, the lawsuit states that they would never have the Men's World Cup held on "unsafe" artificial turf and thus violates the Canadian Human Rights Act.

Football events
Date	Event	Home team	Away team	Winner	Score	Attendance
September 26, 2010	Touchdown Atlantic	Toronto Argonauts	Edmonton Eskimos	Edmonton Eskimos	6–24	20,725
September 25, 2011	Touchdown Atlantic II	Hamilton Tiger-Cats	Calgary Stampeders	Hamilton Tiger-Cats	55–36	20,153
November 18, 2011	Uteck Bowl 2011	Acadia Axemen	McMaster Marauders	McMaster Marauders	21–45	3,726
September 21, 2013	Touchdown Atlantic III	Hamilton Tiger-Cats	Montreal Alouettes	Hamilton Tiger-Cats	28–26	15,123
August 25, 2019	Touchdown Atlantic IV	Toronto Argonauts	Montreal Alouettes	Montreal Alouettes	28–22	10,126

Soccer events
Date	Event	Home team	Away team	Winner	Score	Attendance
May 30, 2012	Friendly	Canada	China	Canada	1–0	7,514

2014 FIFA U-20 Women's World Cup
Date	Event	Home team	Away team	Winner	Score	Attendance
August 6, 2014	2014 FIFA U-20 Women's World Cup	England	South Korea	Draw	1–1	3,587
August 6, 2014	2014 FIFA U-20 Women's World Cup	Mexico	Nigeria	Draw	1–1	3,587
August 9, 2014	2014 FIFA U-20 Women's World Cup	England	Mexico	Draw	1–1	4,636
August 9, 2014	2014 FIFA U-20 Women's World Cup	South Korea	Nigeria	Nigeria	1–2	4,636
August 12, 2014	2014 FIFA U-20 Women's World Cup	Ghana	Finland	Ghana	2–1	4,706
August 12, 2014	2014 FIFA U-20 Women's World Cup	United States	China	USA	3–0	4,706
August 17, 2014	2014 FIFA U-20 Women's World Cup	Nigeria	New Zealand	Nigeria	4–1	3,588
August 20, 2014	2014 FIFA U-20 Women's World Cup	North Korea	Nigeria	Nigeria	2–6	4,871

2015 FIFA Women's World Cup
Date	Event	Home team	Away team	Winner	Score	Attendance
June 9, 2015	2015 FIFA Women's World Cup Group F	France	England	France	1–0	11,686
June 9, 2015	2015 FIFA Women's World Cup Group F	Colombia	Mexico	Draw	1–1	11,686
June 13, 2015	2015 FIFA Women's World Cup Group F	France	Colombia	Colombia	0-2	13,138
June 13, 2015	2015 FIFA Women's World Cup Group F	England	Mexico	England	2-1	13,138
June 15, 2015	2015 FIFA Women's World Cup Group B	Ivory Coast	Norway	Norway	1-3	7,147
June 17, 2015	2015 FIFA Women's World Cup Group E	Costa Rica	Brazil	Brazil	0-1	9,543
June 21, 2015	2015 FIFA Women's World Cup Round of 16	Brazil	Australia	Australia	0-1	12,054

Track & field events
Date	Event	Attendance	Notes	Website link
July 2–4, 2010	2010 Canadian Junior Championships in Athletics	N/A		
July 19–25, 2010	2010 World Junior Championships in Athletics	75,000 (over 7 days)		
2013	Canadian Track and Field Championships	N/A		
2014	Canadian Track and Field Championships	N/A		

Other events
Date	Event	Attendance	Notes
November 23, 2009	Olympic Flame In Moncton	12,000	First event in the stadium
September 4, 2016	AtlanticFest 2016	N/A	Music festival

== See also ==
- List of Canadian Premier League stadiums
- List of entertainment events in Greater Moncton
- 2010 World Junior Championships in Athletics
- Canadian Football League
- Moncton Sport Facilities
- Université de Moncton
- Touchdown Atlantic
- Uteck Bowl
