= Dave Naylor =

Canadian sportswriter and television analyst

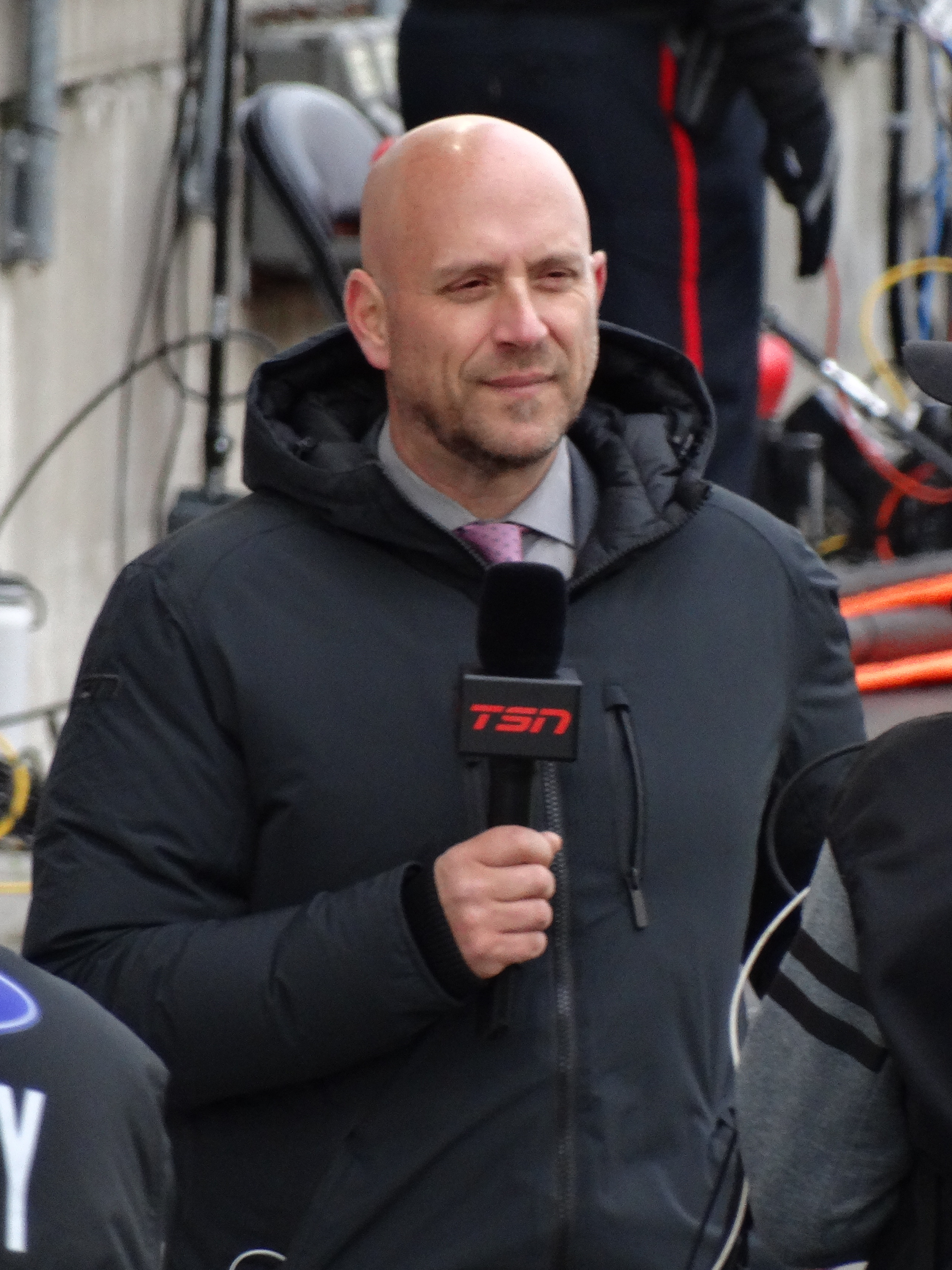
- Naylor in 2022
- Education: Carleton University
- Occupation: Canadian sports reporter
- Employer: TSN

Dave Naylor is a sports journalist and reporter for TSN's SportsCentre, with a focus on the Canadian Football League. He previously worked for CBC Radio and the Globe and Mail. He was inducted into the Canadian Football Hall of Fame's Media Wing on November 29, 2015. He studied journalism at Carleton University.
