= Huskies Stadium =

Stadium on the campus of St. Mary's University in Halifax, Nova Scotia

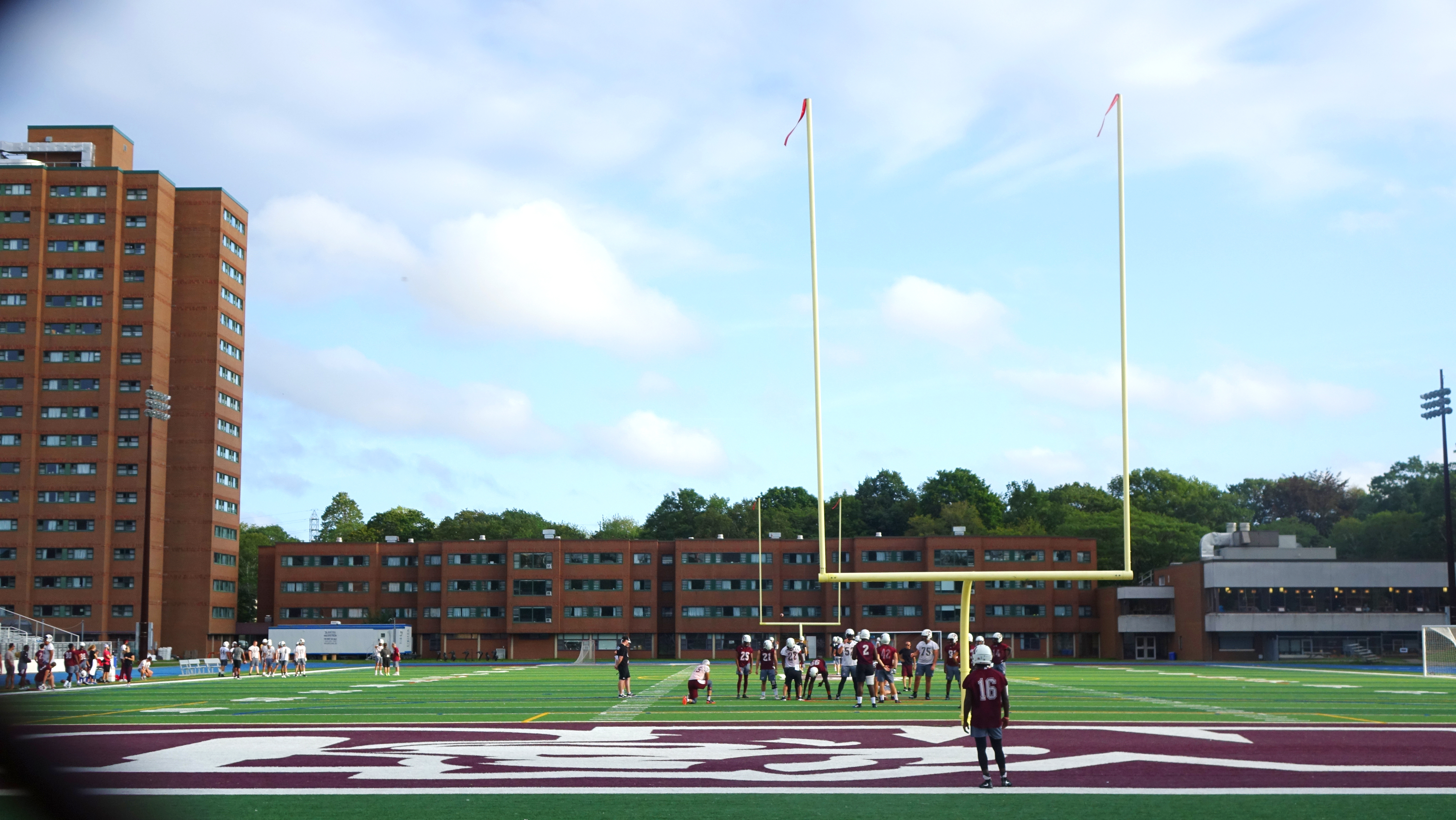
- Huskies Stadium in 2018
- Interactive map of Huskies Stadium
- Coordinates: 44°37′51.85″N 63°34′46.31″W
- Capacity: 2,000 plus standing room Expandable to 11,555
- Surface: FieldTurf

Construction
- Opened: 1970

Tenant
- Saint Mary's Huskies

Huskies Stadium is a Canadian football stadium at Saint Mary's University in Halifax, Nova Scotia, home to the Saint Mary's Huskies.

It had a promoted capacity of 9,000 to 11,000 that is achievable via temporary seating, but the actual permanent seating is only 2,000. It was built in 1969 for the 1970 Canada Summer Games. It has hosted many Canadian Interuniversity Sport Atlantic & Uteck Bowl national semi-final football games.

On June 11, 2005, the stadium hosted an exhibition game between the Hamilton Tiger-Cats and the Toronto Argonauts to gauge Halifax's public support for a CFL franchise. The game was called "Touchdown Atlantic". For the game, the stadium's capacity was temporarily augmented to 11,148. In July 2009, new seating was added that holds up to 500 people on the east-end of the stadium.

The main grandstand was demolished in Spring 2014. The site was used for football and track in 2014 with seating for fans on new east-side bleachers and on a new grassed area formerly occupied by the stadium grandstand. The university said at the time it will continue to examine options for a future new grandstand facility in the interim.

On July 25, 2020, the stadium was scheduled to host Touchdown Atlantic, a regular-season CFL game between the Toronto Argonauts and the Saskatchewan Roughriders, but the game was ultimately rescheduled for 2022 and relocated to Wolfville, Nova Scotia, due to the COVID-19 pandemic. Another Touchdown Atlantic game was played on July 29, 2023. For the 2023 contest, the venue was augmented with temporary seating to bring the capacity to 11,555 spectators.

== CFL Games Hosted ==
Game	Date	Visitor	Score	Home	Attendance	Ref
Preseason	June 11, 2005	Hamilton Tiger-Cats	16–16	Toronto Argonauts	11,148	
Regular season	July 29, 2023	Saskatchewan Roughriders	13–31	Toronto Argonauts	11,555	
