= Canadian Football League in the United States =

Football league of Canada

Canadian Football League Ligue canadienne de football
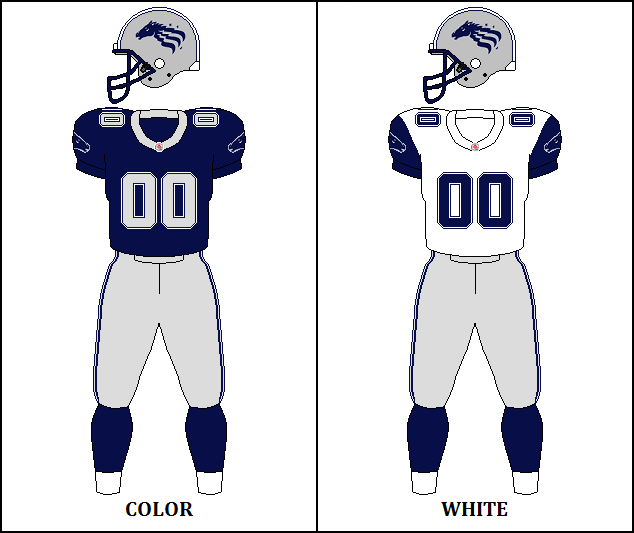
- Sport: Canadian football

The Canadian Football League (CFL) briefly expanded to the United States from the 1993 CFL season through the 1995 CFL season. Canadian football, a form of gridiron football, differs from American football played in the United States, primarily due to its three-down structure and larger playing area.

The first American team, the Sacramento Gold Miners, joined in 1993. The league added three more American teams in 1994, after which two more teams joined, one relocated, and one folded to bring the total to five in 1995. That year, the teams were aligned into a new South Division. The three years saw numerous ownership debacles on both sides of the U.S.–Canada border. The Baltimore Stallions became the only American-based team to win the Grey Cup championship, in 1995. With the exception of Baltimore, the American teams consistently lost money.

Tension also arose between the American and Canadian contingents over rule changes, scheduling, import rules, and marketing. Accommodating the wider and longer Canadian field proved difficult, a problem at most non-Canadian sites. The league returned to being exclusively Canadian beginning with the 1996 season. Although expansion was the most notable CFL effort in the United States, the league had also made previous inroads. Eleven neutral-site CFL games (including exhibition games) have been held in the United States. In earlier decades, when the CFL season started much later than it does today (i.e., around the same time as that of the National Football League), NFL teams were occasionally invited northward for exhibition interleague play.

== Pre-expansion era ==
The CFL had attempted to find a television audience in the United States during the NFL players' strike in 1982. Until 1993, the Canadian Football League, and its predecessor associations, had always operated solely within Canada, despite most other professional sports leagues in North America being cross-border enterprises.

A proposal by Bill Tatham to have his Arizona Outlaws and possibly other teams of the moribund United States Football League enter the CFL after the league suspended operations saw little interest in both leagues.

Six exhibition games held in Canada between 1950 and 1961 pitted NFL teams against CFL teams prior to the CFL moving toward a summer schedule.

=== Neutral site games ===
Eleven neutral-site IRFU/WIFU/CFL games have been played on American soil. The earliest of these dates to 1909, while the bulk occurred between 1951 and 1967. The 1909 game, featuring the Ottawa Rough Riders and Hamilton Tigers of the IRFU, was sponsored by the New York Herald and played at Van Cortlandt Park in the Bronx; this in the era when the Canadian game was more similar to rugby football and did not feature modern rules such as the forward pass like the American game.

The next game, a 1951 match-up between the IRFU's Hamilton Tiger-Cats and Toronto Argonauts in Buffalo, was billed as the first true all-Canadian game played in the United States. Played in a city that at the time was embittered with the National Football League after its All-America Football Conference team was controversially excluded from a merger with the NFL, the Buffalo game drew more than 18,000 fans – a decent crowd for the era. In 1958, the first season officially played under the CFL moniker, Hamilton defeated Ottawa in a regular-season contest in front of about 15,000 in Philadelphia's cavernous Municipal Stadium, 24–18. It remains the only CFL game played outside Canada, involving two Canadian teams, that actually counted in the standings.

Prior to and after the formation of the CFL, teams of the IRFU (a precursor to the CFL's Eastern Football Conference) were regarded as superior to the Western Canadian teams. Starting in the 1930s, Western Canadian teams began aggressively scouting for and recruiting players from the rich American talent pool, largely in an effort to achieve parity with the East. The American Pacific Northwest became a frequent site for WIFU and later CFL preseason games in the 1950s and 1960s with Western teams, particularly the BC Lions, entertaining their regional neighbours. News reports from the time suggest a hybrid game of three down Canadian ball played on the more restricted 100-yard American field.

One BC–Winnipeg matchup in 1960 was held in Cedar Rapids, Iowa, presumably because both teams had a number of former University of Iowa stars. Willie Mitchell, who scored the Lions' only touchdown in a 13–7 loss in front of 12,583, was an Iowan. Western teams were mostly ignored by U.S. clubs as potential opposition for preseason interleague contests, in part due to the more onerous travel requirements to Western Canada. Rail travel was the norm. The WIFU moved up the start of its regular season long before the Eastern section followed suit. It was not until 2019 that NFL teams would play contests in Western Canada.

Most exhibition games involving Canadian teams in the U.S. tended to be characterized by low scores and frequent punting, with crowds between 10,000 and 20,000. These numbers dropped off in the last two games of the era. A low-scoring BC–Edmonton game in Everett, Washington, in 1967 drew just over 6,000. There would not be another CFL game in the United States until the cusp of US expansion in 1992.

Game	Date	Visitor	Score	Home	City	Stadium	Attendance	Ref
Exhibition	December 11, 1909	Hamilton Tigers	11–6	Ottawa Rough Riders	New York City	Van Cortlandt Park	15,000	
Preseason	August 11, 1951	Hamilton Tiger-Cats	17–11	Toronto Argonauts	Buffalo, New York	Civic Stadium	18,146	
Preseason	August 2, 1957	BC Lions	8–29	Edmonton Eskimos	Portland, Oregon	Multnomah Stadium	10,261	
Preseason	August 11, 1957	BC Lions	6–9	Edmonton Eskimos	San Francisco, California	Kezar Stadium	16,000	
Regular season	September 14, 1958	Ottawa Rough Riders	18–24	Hamilton Tiger-Cats	Philadelphia, Pennsylvania	Municipal Stadium	15,110	
Preseason	July 29, 1960	BC Lions	7–13	Winnipeg Blue Bombers	Cedar Rapids, Iowa	Kingston Stadium	12,583	
Preseason	July 29, 1961	BC Lions	13–3	Saskatchewan Roughriders	Seattle, Washington	Husky Stadium	28,000	
Preseason	August 1, 1961	Calgary Stampeders	14–7	Saskatchewan Roughriders	Spokane, Washington	Memorial Stadium	7,511	
Preseason	July 9, 1967	BC Lions	7–2	Edmonton Eskimos	Everett, Washington	Everett Memorial Stadium	6,248	
Preseason	June 25, 1992	Toronto Argonauts	1–20	Calgary Stampeders	Portland, Oregon	Civic Stadium	15,362	
Preseason	June 24, 1995	Baltimore FC	37–0	Birmingham Barracudas	Miami, Florida	Orange Bowl	20,216	

=== Television ===
The idea of attracting American fans through television has long been a goal of the CFL although the results have been intermittent. As early as 1954, the Interprovincial Rugby Football Union (forerunner of the CFL's East Division) struck a deal with NBC that lasted a year and featured 13 games. The infamous Fog Bowl of 1962 was—at least until play was suspended—broadcast by ABC. Over subsequent years various non-major networks picked up an assortment of games.

The fledgling ESPN cable network signed a deal in 1980 to broadcast 30 CFL regular season games and the playoffs, including the Grey Cup in the United States. CFL games became a fixture of the early years of the network. In 1982, after a September strike by NFL players, the CFL got another chance at major network exposure: NBC bought out the ESPN rights for $100,000 a game to make up for its own lost football programming. NBC aired CFL games on Sunday afternoons with full NFL production values and announcing crews. However, every one of the four games shown was a blowout, and the league and network decided to black out the games on the NBC stations closest to the Canadian border. Ratings were a major disappointment. NBC quickly backed out of the arrangement.

== Expansion ==
Location of CFL teams

=== Background ===
The idea of expansion into the United States began to take shape in the early 1990s, prompted by precarious ownership situations and chronic money shortages among the existing Canadian teams. The chief catalyst of the league's struggles was Carling O'Keefe's decision to stop its lucrative television sponsorship in 1987. The arrangement had provided steady income to all of the league's teams, reaching $11 million per season before its withdrawal.

Despite the guaranteed revenues, the league failed to grow. The television money subsidized shoddy financial practices and marketing both at the team and league level. Longtime CFL commissioner Jake Gaudaur, who had negotiated the league's sponsorship deals with Carling retired in 1984. The Montreal Alouettes, having been rescued from failure five years prior, folded during the 1987 preseason. It would take two decades for economic equilibrium to again be reestablished. Concurrently with Carling O'Keefe's withdrawal, CTV Television Network, its television partner for the previous 26 seasons, cancelled its CFL broadcasts prior to the 1987 season. This forced the league to take over syndication of the package itself and divert much of the remaining rights fees from its other television partners to the Canadian Football Network.

With the exception of the Edmonton Eskimos, every team in the league had faced some kind of crisis in the years leading up to 1993. In addition to Montreal's sudden collapse, the Calgary Stampeders and publicly owned Saskatchewan Roughriders had to mount public campaigns to survive. By 1993, the BC Lions had experienced years of ownership chaos and the Winnipeg Blue Bombers faced $3 million in debt, despite frugal management. The Toronto Argonauts were embroiled in a series of ownership crises after the initially successful ownership triumvirate of Bruce McNall, Wayne Gretzky, and John Candy faced mounting financial losses. The Hamilton Tiger-Cats were confronting an attendance swoon, fan malaise, and struggling community ownership. Both Southern Ontario teams faced competition at the gate from the NFL's Buffalo Bills, then in the middle of their historic run of four consecutive Super Bowl appearances. Finally, the Ottawa Rough Riders and their fans saw squads on the field and constant drama off it from the team's under-capitalized and mercurial owner, Bernie Glieberman.

Against this economic backdrop, a new generation of venture capitalist owners took the place of the local consortiums and philanthropists that typically had owned the teams and operated them without any serious profit motive. They were led by McNall in Toronto, Glieberman in Ottawa, and Larry Ryckman in Calgary. Larry Smith was hired as league commissioner in February 1992, reportedly on the explicit understanding that he would pursue American expansion. While Smith would become the most visible face of the era, he emphasized that it was the owners who drove the initiative, particularly McNall and Ryckman. McNall's issues with cash flow, later revealed to be the result wealth inflation through illegal accounting, was one obvious instigator. While the newer owners championed expansion, equal distribution of the expansion fees also appealed to the community-owned teams as these would shore up their finances.

=== 1992–1993 ===
With the green light from the owners, Smith began the task of expanding the league across the border, beginning with a June 1992 exhibition game between the Argonauts and Stampeders in Portland, Oregon. A total of 15,362 attended, close to the averages later American teams would post. Portland was seriously considered for a franchise, but investors failed to emerge. The expansion announcement prompted numerous applications from a wide variety of American cities. By the end of the expansion era, a minimum of twenty-two cities were reported to have been considered for teams.

Coincidentally, the World League of American Football, an attempt by the NFL to create a spring league in major markets without NFL teams (including Montreal), suspended its North American operations after its 1992 season. WLAF owners Fred Anderson of the Sacramento Surge and Larry J. Benson of the San Antonio Riders applied to join the CFL as the Sacramento Gold Miners and San Antonio Texans, respectively. On January 13, 1993, the league approved both franchises by a vote of 7–1, with Winnipeg dissenting. League owners also decided not to apply the requirement of twenty "non-import" Canadian-raised players to the American squads. They were advised the requirement would violate US employment laws.

The experiment started on a sour note when an ownership dispute forced Benson to pull San Antonio out on the same evening the franchise was to be formally introduced. Anderson decided to continue with the venture after Benson's withdrawal, but made clear that he did not want his team to be the only American franchise after 1993. The Gold Miners were placed in the strong West Division and finished last with a record of 6–12. The Gold Miners played at the austere Hornet Stadium, located on the campus of Sacramento State University and averaged around 17,000 fans per game. This was down from the roughly 21,000 fans per game the Surge had drawn in 1992; they sold 9,000 season tickets.

In response to talent disparity between the East and West Divisions, it was decided in the middle of the season to grant the fourth-place Western team a playoff berth, with some speculation this was done in part to ensure Sacramento remained in playoff contention as long as possible. Later it was seen that Ryckman preferred the revenue of two playoff games for his first-place Stampeders over a first-round bye.

=== 1994 ===
1994 Regular Season Attendance Figures
Team	Average	High	Low
Baltimore FC	37,347	42,116	31,172
Las Vegas Posse	9,527	14,432	2,350
Sacramento Gold Miners	14,226	17,192	12,633
Shreveport Pirates	17,871	32,011	12,465
Canadian average	22,740	51,180	11,248

In 1994 the Gold Miners were joined by three other American teams: the Las Vegas Posse, Baltimore CFL Colts, and Shreveport Pirates. On television ESPN and its subsidiary ESPN2 picked up some games alongside the usual broadcasting by TSN and CBC in Canada. Shreveport and Baltimore were placed in the East Division, while Sacramento and Las Vegas were placed in the West. The playoffs were expanded again to eight teams (four per division). Another franchise was to have been added in Orlando; however, in a debacle that had now become a pattern, the presumptive ownership group failed to appear at the January 1994 press conference announcing the team's formation.

The Baltimore CFL Colts made headlines before even playing a down. Owned by Jim Speros, the team was marketed as a revival of the Baltimore Colts NFL franchise, who had left the city 10 years earlier and had also played at Memorial Stadium. The team's embrace of the Colts' history gained them an instant following in Baltimore and publicity in the national sports media, although an injunction obtained shortly before the team's first game forced the team to stop using "Colts" in their name and to instead refer to the team as the "Baltimore CFLers" or "Baltimore Football Club". Since Memorial Stadium had originally been built to accommodate Major League Baseball's Baltimore Orioles as well as football, its playing surface was large enough to accommodate a full-size Canadian field.

Baltimore was the most successful of any American CFL team both on the field and off, averaging crowds of 37,000 their first year. Knowing that Canadian football was considerably different from the American game, Speros stocked the Baltimore club mostly with long-tenured CFL players. As coach, he brought in Don Matthews, who had already played in two Grey Cups and won one. The result was a team that eventually finished second in the Eastern Conference with a 12–6 record and became the first American team to qualify for the playoffs, advancing all the way to the Grey Cup game. In a thrilling game played in BC Place, the BC Lions defeated Baltimore on a last-second field goal by Lui Passaglia. Perhaps most remarkably, they were reported to have turned a profit in their first year after an initial US$7 million investment by Speros.

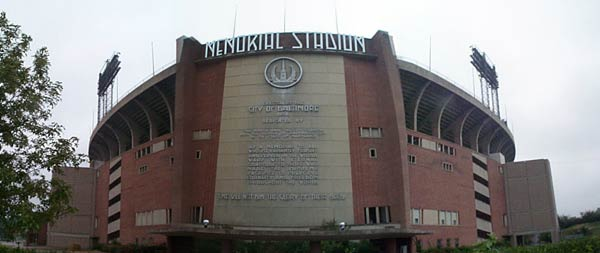
Memorial Stadium in Baltimore was home to the Baltimore Stallions, easily the most successful CFL expansion team in the United States. They averaged more than 30,000 fans each of their two years.

The Shreveport Pirates were actually a transplantation of Bernie Glieberman and his organization from Ottawa. The Gliebermans had hinted at moving the Rough Riders to the United States, making them even more unpopular than they already were in Canada's capital. As part of a settlement with the CFL, Glieberman sold the Rough Riders to Bruce Firestone for CA$1.85 million, and in return was granted a US-based expansion team which became the Shreveport Pirates. As part of the deal, Glieberman not only had to pay the expansion fee, but also had to settle his previous Ottawa debts. There was a groundswell of local support for the club, but also significant difficulties in its first year, including stifling weather, cultural clashes, organizational gaffes, and serious hints of under-capitalization (during training camp the team was housed in a dorm above a milking barn). A woeful record did not help, as the team lost its first 14 games. The Pirates showed some promise at the end of the season, reeling off a 3–1 record in their final four games; attendance also jumped, and the home finale drew over 32,000 fans to 40,000-seat Independence Stadium, the highest for any U.S.-hosted CFL game outside Baltimore.

The Gold Miners, after spending much of 1993 adjusting to the Canadian game, rebounded strongly to finish 9–8–1 in their second season, three points short of the playoffs. They were led again by David Archer at quarterback, who had persisted with the team since its World League days as the Sacramento Surge. However, in what was to become a trend during the CFL expansion, the second Sacramento season saw an attendance decline.

At the other end of the spectrum, the Posse were an abject failure both on the field and off. Playing in Sam Boyd Stadium on the outskirts of the city and practicing on an ersatz practice field in the parking lot of the Riviera Hotel and Casino on the Las Vegas Strip, the team became infamous for botched gimmicks. Attendance, never good to begin with, dropped to embarrassing levels as the season went on. With such dreadful gates, the team's cash flow dwindled to the point that, according to one assistant coach, "we couldn't even afford paper." After only 2,350 attended an October home game against Winnipeg (the lowest-attended game since the CFL's founding in 1958), owner Nick Mileti announced the team was suspending operations. To avoid shuttering a team mid-season, the league moved the Posse's final home game to Edmonton. The team was little better on the field, finishing 5–13—the second-worst record in the league (ahead of only the Pirates).

=== 1994–1995 offseason ===
Moving the Posse became the league's primary headache of the offseason, with the league twice granting provisional approval for the franchise's relocation. A Milwaukee bid was to be owned by Marvin Fishman and use Milwaukee County Stadium, which had previously hosted Green Bay Packers home games. The deal fell apart when County Stadium's main tenants, the Milwaukee Brewers demanded rent of $40,000 per game. Moving the Posse to Mississippi soon gained momentum, with the team hiring a coaching staff and being on the league's internal schedule, only for the deal to collapse amid squabbles within the Las Vegas corporation that owned the Posse. A group from Miami, Florida, tried to convince the league to let it buy the remains of the Posse and move them to South Florida as the Miami Manatees, to play in the Miami Orange Bowl. An exhibition game between Birmingham and Baltimore was held there in June 1995 to gauge support, which drew a crowd just above 20,000. The Posse would be dissolved in April 1995.

The Gold Miners grew increasingly dissatisfied with Hornet Stadium, and Anderson blamed losses of US$10 million over two years on the facility. After attempts to have Sacramento State upgrade or replace the facility failed, he announced in October 1994 that the Gold Miners would be playing elsewhere in 1995. Anderson initially intended to move to Oakland, but quickly abandoned those plans after it became apparent that Los Angeles Raiders owner Al Davis was seriously considering moving his NFL franchise back to its original city (the move came to pass). The Gold Miners eventually moved to the Alamodome in San Antonio, Texas, where they played as the San Antonio Texans.

With the Posse folding, the Gold Miners moving, and the Pirates facing money troubles, three of the four CFL expansion teams had stumbled. The league, however, still managed to expand into two new markets for the 1995 season. The Memphis Mad Dogs were announced in November 1994, followed by the Birmingham Barracudas in January 1995. The Memphis deal was hailed as a large step forward for the league's presence in the U.S., as it brought in the wealth of team owner Fred Smith (the founder and CEO of Federal Express) and his marketing connections.

=== 1995 ===
With these changes, the CFL abandoned its longstanding east–west divisional format in favour of a north–south format for 1995. The five American teams—Baltimore, Birmingham, Memphis, San Antonio, and Shreveport—would be placed in the South Division, while the eight Canadian teams were included in the North Division. The top five Canadian teams and top three American teams would qualify for the playoffs; the fifth-seeded North team would "cross over" to the South playoffs, for a total of four teams per playoff bracket. The league gained its first national American television contract with ESPN2, which agreed to televise more than 20 regular season games, plus the playoffs. The deal was reportedly worth about $1.5 million (equivalent to $3 million in 2025). The CFL would remain on the network until 1997.

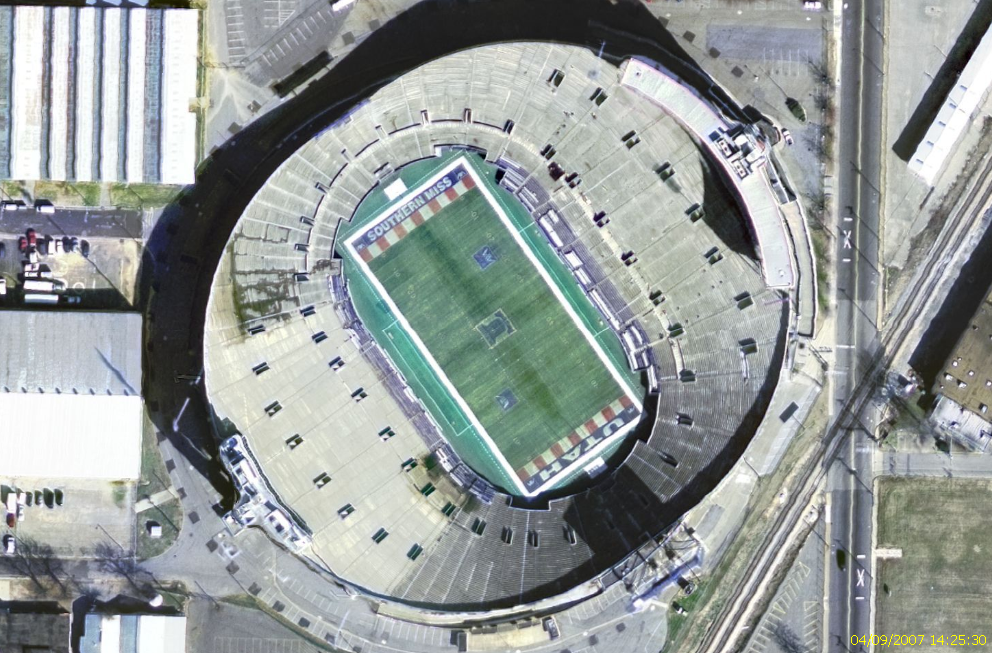
Overhead view of Liberty Bowl Memorial Stadium in Memphis. While few of the American stadiums to host Canadian football were ideal corners cut at the Liberty Bowl were particularly severe. The field was well short of regulation length.

The Birmingham Barracudas, owned by insurance tycoon Art Williams, entered the league playing at Legion Field, which could accommodate a Canadian football field with 15-yard end zones (five yards shorter than the standard 20 yards). Led by future Hall of Famer Matt Dunigan at quarterback, the Barracudas fell short of the South Division title, but remained competitive throughout the year. Despite selling only 2,000 season tickets and facing community apathy after numerous attempts at pro football squads had failed in the city, attendance for the first three games exceeded expectations. Williams knew that the 'Cudas potentially faced serious attendance problems once the traditional American football season began, and persuaded the CFL to let them play their late-season home games on Sunday afternoons – something the league had avoided to avoid putting its television broadcasts in direct competition with the NFL's. Williams calculated that competing with the NFL on television was a more reasonable risk to take compared to competition with local high school and Alabama/Auburn college football. Despite the time change, attendance still dropped to unsustainable levels; none of the final four home games attracted more than 10,000 people. Williams claimed to have lost at least US$10 million on the season—at least as much as his startup costs—and blamed fan apathy for the attendance woes.

Memphis had been a prime target for either expansion or relocation, as it was near Shreveport and San Antonio. In 1995, Fred Smith's ownership group, which had narrowly missed out on an NFL team, was awarded a CFL franchise to begin play as the Memphis Mad Dogs. The Mad Dogs played in the Liberty Bowl, which had to be heavily reconfigured to accommodate the Canadian game. Astroturf sections were added around the grass field to accommodate the required width, while the expansion of the length of the field to 110 yards forced the end zones to become half Astroturf pentagons that averaged seven yards in the corners and fourteen yards behind the uprights. The grandstands stood mere yards from the end line, prompting veteran CFL quarterback Danny McManus to call the end zones "a lawsuit waiting to happen."

Like Williams, Smith knew the Mad Dogs would face an uphill battle attracting fans once the traditional American football season started. As was the case in Birmingham, Smith persuaded the CFL to let the Dogs play their late-season home games on Sundays to avoid competing against high school and Tennessee/Ole Miss football. It was of no avail; late in the season the Mad Dogs struggled to attract more than 10,000 people. Like Williams, Smith publicly blamed community apathy and media hostility for the lackluster attendance. The team went 9–9 in their only year.

In Shreveport, meanwhile, whatever positive momentum the Pirates had gained at the end of the 1994 season failed to carry over into 1995. Despite the signing of former NFL quarterback Billy Joe Tolliver, who put up decent numbers, the squad limped to a 5–13 record. As elsewhere, Shreveport saw a second season attendance decline, and with the season winding down, the city had clearly soured on the Gliebermans. They became embroiled in legal difficulties and, in one particularly absurd incident, Bernie Glieberman had his lawyer attempt (unsuccessfully) to abscond with a half-million dollar Tucker automobile that Glieberman had donated to a local museum.

Freshly relocated from Sacramento, the San Antonio Texans finally found success on the field in 1995 playing in the brand new Alamodome. The Alamodome offered two advantages over other U.S. facilities – it was a multi-purpose facility with retractable seating that could accommodate a full size CFL field, and it was an indoor, air-conditioned facility, meaning the teams playing there did not have to deal with the summer heat. The team continued to be bankrolled by the enthusiastic Fred Anderson. Archer, entering his fifth year as Anderson's quarterback, led the second best offence in the league; he nevertheless suffered an injury late in the season, prompting the team to hire 45-year-old Joe Ferguson (whom Stephenson had coached as a member of the Buffalo Bills) out of retirement to serve as a backup. They finished 12–6 and finally made the playoffs. In the first round they trounced Birmingham, 51–9, before falling to the Baltimore Stallions, 21–11, in the South Division final. Team attendance was around the same level Anderson had previously seen in Sacramento.

1995 Regular Season Attendance Figures
Team	Average	High	Low
Baltimore Stallions	30,111	33,208	27,321
Birmingham Barracudas	17,625	31,185	6,317
Memphis Mad Dogs	13,691	20,183	7,830
San Antonio Texans	15,855	22,043	10,027
Shreveport Pirates	14,359	21,117	11,554
Canadian figures	24,406	55,438	14,122

The Baltimore franchise finally received a permanent name, the "Baltimore Stallions." Led by quarterback Tracy Ham and running back Mike Pringle, the Stallions started 2–3, but then steamrolled through the rest of the season, winning 13 games in a row to finish first in the South Division. They knocked off Winnipeg and then San Antonio in the South Division final. They faced the Calgary Stampeders in the 1995 Grey Cup in Regina, Saskatchewan and won convincingly, 37–20. The first and only American team to take the championship, the 1995 Stallions team has since acquired a reputation as one of the CFL's best ever. At the time, their .756 winning percentage over their first two seasons was the best start for an expansion team in North American professional sports history.

While the Stallions experienced a successful year on the field, and finished second to Edmonton in average attendance, the city's excitement of 1994 died down. Attendance declined, with season ticket sales dropping to around 17,000. Later reports suggested that attendance numbers had been inflated by giveaways and the team projected some losses in 1995. Despite these difficulties, the Stallions remained the model that lent the American expansion project credibility; other American owners looked to Baltimore in deciding on the future of their own teams.

=== 1995 Playoffs ===
==== League troubles ====
Despite some positive initial attendance numbers, after three years it was clear that general American fan interest in Canadian football was sparse. Differences in the Canadian game, such as three downs and the larger field, had not been embraced south of the border. While the CFL had a small deal with ESPN2, a major television contract had not materialized; efforts by the league's U.S. teams to negotiate a deal with CBS Sports failed after the network managed to pick up college football rights for 1996. There was no widespread national promotional effort for the league in the U.S., and the general preference to avoid competing with the NFL in major markets hurt its efforts to reach out to major media platforms. Moreover, the July to November CFL season, designed to ensure the playoffs finish before Canada's harsh winters set in, forced most American teams to play the first half of the season in oppressive heat and the second half in competition with high school football, college football, and the NFL.

Tension had also arisen between the American and Canadian teams. As early as the 1994 Grey Cup, the American owners, led by Speros in Baltimore, were calling for numerous changes to accommodate the American teams and their potential fans. They proposed that the end zones be reduced to 15 yards in length, that the Grey Cup be played earlier in the year, that player quotas be removed for all teams, and that a league name change be considered. By 1995, Mad Dogs coach Pepper Rodgers was openly disparaging Canadian rules and teams. Officials of the new American teams found that the Canadian clubs were hesitant to accommodate the new American audience. The Canadian owners, for their part, refused to make any major changes to the rules, the schedule, or the name of the league; the only concession they made was to allow smaller field sizes in American stadiums that could not fit a regulation CFL field.

Agreement on rules and schedules might have been reached had the league achieved economic stability, but losses among American teams were drastic and widespread. In 1995 alone, Fred Anderson estimated that the U.S. teams had collectively lost more than US$20 million. The Baltimore Sun provides a similar estimate of US$21 million. The $10 million estimated loss in Birmingham was the most substantial, followed by US$4 to $6 million estimated for Anderson's Texans. Memphis and Shreveport losses were estimated at US$3 million apiece. The Baltimore losses were comparatively modest at US$1 to $1.5 million, but stung the league, given the prestige of the franchise.

Canadian teams were facing their own troubles, particularly with attendance. The eight Canadian teams were down to an average of 22,740 in 1994, a drop of 3,000 from the previous year. It marked the beginning of an historic trough in Canadian CFL attendance that would last for most of the 1990s. A massive league-wide season ticket drive was undertaken prior to 1995. Commissioner Larry Smith told the Rough Riders and Tiger-Cats that unless they sold more tickets, they would be forced to either fold or move. Ottawa owner Bruce Firestone went bankrupt after the 1994 season, placing the team in the hands of Horn Chen, who turned out to be its final owner. In Calgary, Ryckman suggested he would move the Stampeders to the United States unless fans stepped up with 16,000 season tickets. While season ticket goals were met, the overall increase in attendance was modest in 1995 to 24,406 and would be wiped out the next year. In Toronto, Bruce McNall sold the Argos to league television partner TSN in May 1994, a sale delayed by John Candy's death that March. Later that year, McNall's finances imploded in the midst of revelations of financial wrongdoing.

==== The last international Grey Cup ====
With these troubles still fresh, the NFL then dealt the CFL's American expansion a critical blow. On November 6, 1995—the week of the South Division Final—Cleveland Browns owner Art Modell announced he was moving his NFL franchise to Baltimore for the following season. A day after the game, the Stallions' owners called Commissioner Smith and requested a meeting in Toronto; Smith's summary of their position was "we'll pay our bills but we're done." The Stallions had been broadsided by the announcement, even though rumours of the NFL's impending return to Baltimore had cropped up as early as September. Speros and other insiders initially did not believe Modell was serious, a belief shared for a time even by some NFL owners. Even as it became clear that the Browns' relocation threat was credible, they still hoped NFL owners known to be opposed to the Browns' relocation such as Pittsburgh's Dan Rooney and Buffalo's Ralph Wilson would persuade Modell to come to terms with Cleveland. Nonetheless, by November the rumours were enough to seriously impair the Stallions' marketing efforts, and attendance for the team's semi-final against Winnipeg (played two days before the Browns' announcement) was a franchise low of 21,040.

Once the Browns' move became official, what remained of local support for the Stallions dried up almost overnight. The team responded with desperate measures, essentially giving away thousands of tickets for what would become the final CFL game played in the United States, and announced a respectable attendance of 30,217 for their South Division Final victory over San Antonio. It was to no avail; the Grey Cup victory celebration in Inner Harbor went almost unnoticed in local media.

Speros quickly realized that as successful as the Stallions had been, they could not compete with an NFL team. While Baltimore Mayor Kurt Schmoke (one of the few dignitaries to attend the Stallions' championship celebration) and some others claimed it was possible that the Stallions could coexist with the new Baltimore Ravens, Speros felt that logistical issues, lack of advertising revenue, and divided fan support would reduce the Stallions to "minor league" status had they stayed in Baltimore.

Speros began talks with Richmond, Norfolk, the Lehigh Valley, and, most seriously, Houston, which was about to lose the NFL's Oilers. At one point, he was prepared to move to Houston and play in the Astrodome, and also intended to take on then-Houston Astros owner Drayton McLane as a minority partner. Williams had decided to get out even before Baltimore's fate was announced; a day after the Barracudas were eliminated from the playoffs (and a day before the Browns announced they were leaving Cleveland), he announced that the squad would not be playing in Birmingham in 1996, if it returned at all. Earlier, he had stated that he was not willing to play another season in Birmingham unless the league moved to a spring schedule; he felt it would be folly to risk another season competing with college football.

The end came swiftly in the months after the Grey Cup. By the time of a December 1 CFL Board of Governors meeting, the Mad Dogs had officially folded. The Pirates held out a little longer and flirted with a relocation to Norfolk, but local officials broke off talks after they learned that Glieberman was still facing legal disputes in Shreveport. The Barracudas resurfaced in the news in January 1996 when Williams sold them for $750,000 to a group that planned to move them to Shreveport as a replacement for the Pirates. However, that deal was contingent upon the league approving the sale and relocation, which never happened.

Smith had given the American teams until the end of January 1996 to decide whether they would return for the 1996 season. By then, sources were stating that four of the five American teams had "either folded, have no stadiums to play in or will not be permitted to be part of the CFL in 1996." Only the Stallions appeared to be able to take the field in some form for the 1996 season. Of the American owners, Anderson was the most amenable to retaining an American-based team in 1996. While he initially stated that the league needed at least three other American teams for the Texans to be viable, he was willing to bring the Texans back for 1996 if the Stallions moved to Houston, since this would have not only ensured two American teams but also an intrastate rivalry. Anderson estimated that if there was even one other American team in the league, he could withstand annual losses of US$2 million indefinitely. However, that scenario looked less and less likely, as Speros—under prodding from Smith—had begun serious discussions with officials in Montreal.

Against this backdrop, a second round of league meetings was held on February 2, where all five American franchises, including the Stallions, were formally shuttered, bringing the CFL's American expansion to a close. At the same time, former Stallions owner Speros was granted a "reactivated" Alouettes franchise in Montreal. Stallions general manager Jim Popp and much of the Stallions' coaching and front office staff moved north to Montreal and much of the club's roster re-signed with the Alouettes.

== Post-expansion ==
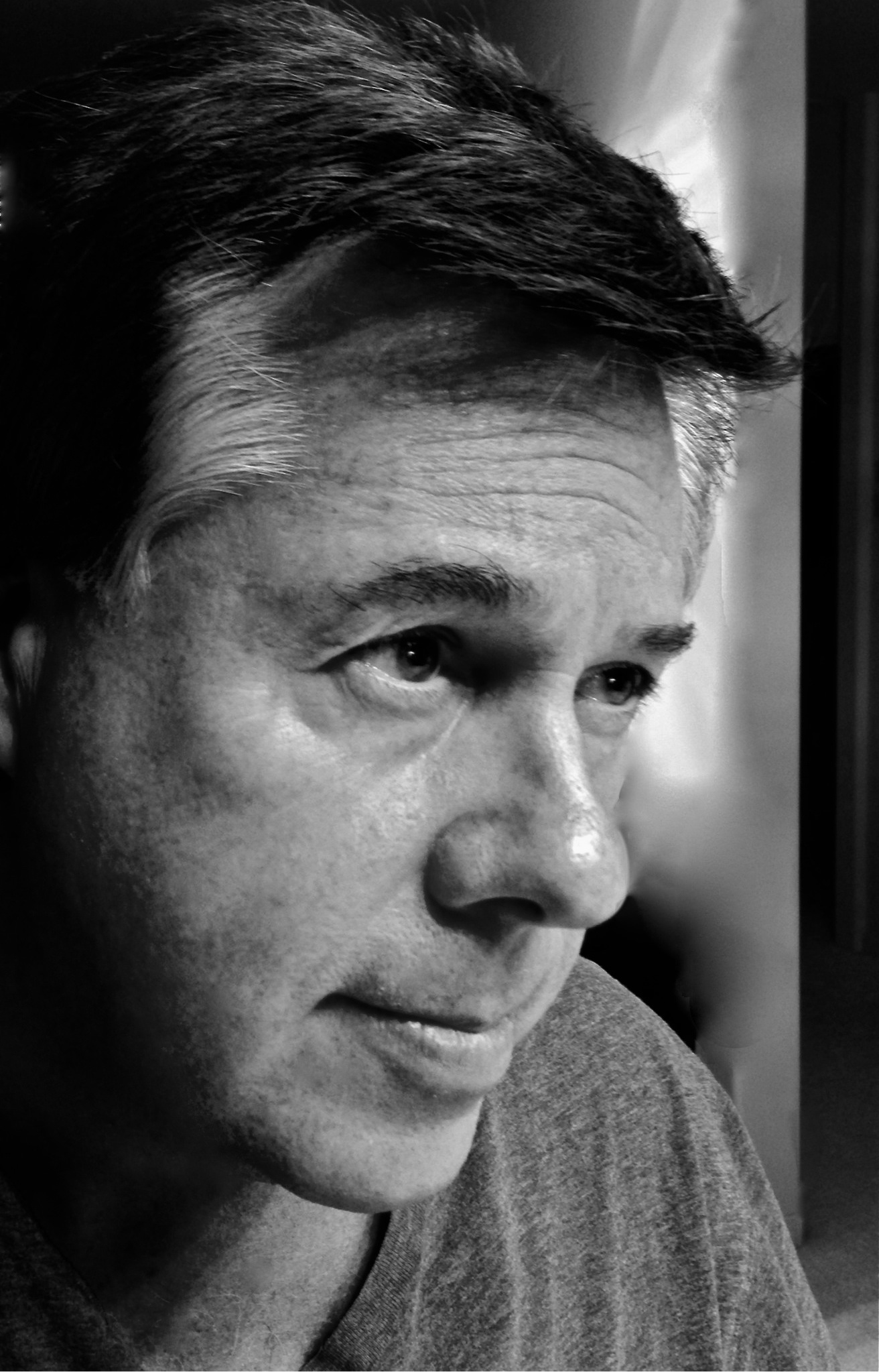
Calgary Stampeders head Larry Ryckman was a driving force behind American expansion. Like Bruce McNall in Toronto, he would face a dramatic fall.

The entire league was once again based only in Canada beginning with the 1996 CFL season. Smith described the move as a "retrenchment:" with no expansion fee revenue to buoy them, eight of the nine teams would lose money that year. The 84th Grey Cup was nearly canceled before the coffee shop chain Tim Hortons stepped in and provided enough sponsorship money to allow both competing teams to collect their paychecks. The Ottawa Rough Riders disbanded at the end of the season and the Stampeders declared bankruptcy after Ryckman was fined $250,000 for stock manipulation by the Alberta Securities Commission and barred from doing business in Alberta.

After the indictment of McNall, Ryckman was the second major architect of expansion to run afoul of the law; the Stampeders were later bought by Sig Gutsche via a receivership court for $1.6 million on April 3. Other legal troubles were left over in wake of the expansion collapse. Louisiana courts eventually ordered the Gliebermans to repay Shreveport US$1 million with interest; the dispute centered over whether the city had agreed to share losses or simply lent money to the ownership group. Art Williams, enraged after discovering some American owners had received discounts and extended payment periods on their franchise fees, threatened litigation and at first refused to honour the balance of Matt Dunigan's sizable contract before the matter entered litigation.

The expansion fees themselves were a significant legacy of the expansion effort. Smith claims US$14 to $15 million was brought in and that it saved the league. A more modest assessment suggests expansion saved the Stampeders and Tiger-Cats—both teams were undeniably in distress during the era—and that the other Canadian teams were able to maintain a semblance of stability. The post-expansion financial crisis would eventually elicit a response from the NFL regarding long-standing speculation about placing a franchise in Toronto. Given fears it would mean the end of the CFL, the NFL provided the CFL franchises with marketing assistance and a $3 million loan in 1997 in exchange for a new player agreement between the leagues.

=== XFL ===
In 1999, World Wrestling Federation chairman Vince McMahon was offered the chance to buy the Argonauts, and countered with a proposal to buy the entire league and "have it migrate south", which the owners refused. McMahon would instead partner with NBC to create the XFL, which would place teams in Birmingham, Las Vegas, and Memphis at the same stadiums as their respective CFL franchises previously played. Following massive losses, NBC and the WWF shuttered the XFL after one year, though it would return nineteen years later—conspicuously absent from any markets where the CFL had resided (subsequent XFL owners would return to Las Vegas and to San Antonio in 2023). Birmingham (the Iron and Stallions) and Memphis (Express and Showboats, the latter of which was brought to Memphis by Mad Dogs owner Fred Smith) both hosted teams in the XFL's contemporary rivals, the Alliance of American Football and revived United States Football League, respectively. Baltimore owner Jim Speros would later briefly re-emerge as the original owner of the Virginia Destroyers of the United Football League but withdrew from the purchase before the team began play.

=== Salary cap era ===
The CFL re-gained financial stability in the 2000s, mostly thanks to enforcement of a salary cap, stricter standards of ownership, and increasingly lucrative television contracts negotiated with Canadian networks. The league has remained solely focused on its Canadian operations, with expansion efforts focused for decades on returning a stable team to Ottawa. The first attempt at a replacement for the Rough Riders, the Ottawa Renegades, played from 2002 to 2005. A second attempt, the Ottawa RedBlacks launched in 2014 and have so far been a success under the ownership of Jeff Hunt's consortium. Further expansion efforts were limited to one-off games such as Touchdown Atlantic and Northern Kickoff in more distant Canadian markets until the late 2010s when the league commenced negotiations with Schooners Sports and Entertainment to place an expansion team in Atlantic Canada, efforts that were ultimately unsuccessful and were abandoned in 2023.

The re-establishment of the Montreal Alouettes remains as the major legacy of the American experiment. Commissioner Smith, under pressure from the CFLPA and keen to ensure Montreal's new team was a Grey Cup contender from the outset, persuaded the other eight CFL teams to permit an expansion draft in which the Alouettes were allowed to draft only Canadian players to allow the team to remain competitive under the more restrictive rule regime, finishing their first season 12–6 and advancing to the East Final. Eventually, Speros would sell the Alouettes to Robert Wetenhall, with Smith resigning as commissioner to become President of the team. Wetenhall's patient ownership, and a move to the more intimate Percival Molson Memorial Stadium, returned the team to stability off the field while steering it to three Grey Cups on the field. Longtime Alouettes starting quarterback Anthony Calvillo was the last remaining active player that played for an American CFL team (Las Vegas) upon his retirement after the 2013 season. Further U.S. expansion has been occasionally proposed informally. However, the league itself has expressed little interest in these proposals and U.S. expansion has not been formally explored.

=== Ongoing American media ===
For several years after the expansion era contract with ESPN ended in 1997, the CFL was absent from American television. At the end of 2001, the league began a relationship with the now-defunct America One network that would last until 2009. Coverage was relatively generous with 43 games, including the playoffs, covered in the last year. A more modest deal of 14 games was negotiated with the NFL Network in 2010, which lasted two years.

ESPN and its Canadian partner TSN became the favoured relationship in the subsequent decade. ESPN matched the 14-game package and gained exclusivity along with NBC Sports Network; this brought a modest but stable American audience in the low hundreds of thousands per game. The broadcast fees TSN paid to the league would prove crucial to its surviving the 2010s. American broadcasts typically provide simulcasts of game coverage from TSN.

Beginning in 2023, CBS Sports Network became the main American partner alongside TSN. A million dollar deal saw CBS pick 34 regular season games with options for more, including the Grey Cup. CBS pushes CFL games through its streaming services, including a dedicated CFL+ option.

== List of American CFL teams ==
=== Teams that played ===
Team	City	Stadium	Capacity	Playing surface	Field size for CFL play	Head Coach	General Manager	Owner	Active
Sacramento Gold Miners	Sacramento, California	Hornet Stadium	21,195	Grass	CFL regulation (end zones clipped for running track)	Kay Stephenson	Tom Huiskens	Fred Anderson	1993–1994
Las Vegas Posse	Whitney, Nevada	Sam Boyd Stadium	45,000	Grass/AstroTurf mix	15-yard end zones	Ron Meyer	Nick Mileti	Public corporation	1994
Baltimore FC/ Baltimore Stallions	Baltimore, Maryland	Memorial Stadium (Baltimore)	53,371	Grass	CFL regulation	Don Matthews	Jim Popp	Jim Speros	1994–1995
Shreveport Pirates	Shreveport, Louisiana	Independence Stadium	40,000	Grass	15-yard end zones	John Huard and Forrest Gregg	J. I. Albrecht, Terri Sipes	Bernard Glieberman	1994–1995
San Antonio Texans (1995, relocated from Sacramento)	San Antonio, Texas	Alamodome	59,000	Astroturf	CFL regulation	Kay Stephenson	Tom Bass	Fred Anderson	1995
Birmingham Barracudas	Birmingham, Alabama	Legion Field	83,091	Grass	15-yard end zones	Jack Pardee	Roy Shivers	Art Williams	1995
Memphis Mad Dogs	Memphis, Tennessee	Liberty Bowl Memorial Stadium	62,380	Grass/AstroTurf mix	Pentagon end zones, from 5 to 12 yards in length	Pepper Rodgers	Steve Ehrhart	Frederick W. Smith	1995

=== Proposed teams that did not play ===
Team	City	Stadium	Capacity	Owner	Scheduled to begin play
Milwaukee CFL team	Milwaukee, Wisconsin	County Stadium	53,192	Marvin Fishman	1995
Mississippi Mudcats	Jackson, Mississippi	Mississippi Veterans Memorial Stadium	60,492	William L. Collins, Norton Herrick, Jimmy Buffett, or combination	1995
Miami Manatees	Miami, Florida	Miami Orange Bowl	74,476	Ron Meyer	1996
San Antonio Texans (1993)	San Marcos, Texas	Bobcat Stadium	15,218	Larry J. Benson	1993
Shreveport Barracudas	Shreveport, Louisiana	Independence Stadium	53,000	Ark-La-Tex Football, Inc.	1996

== See also ==
- List of National Football League games played outside the United States
- CFL USA all-time records and statistics
