= San Antonio Texans =

Canadian Football League team

Logo

General information
- Founded: 1995
- Folded: 1995
- Stadium: Alamodome
- Headquartered: San Antonio, Texas, United States
- Colours: Teal, old gold, black, burgundy, and white

Personnel
- Owner: Fred Anderson
- Head coach: Kay Stephenson

League / conference affiliations
- Canadian Football League; South Division

The San Antonio Texans were a Canadian Football League (CFL) team that played in the Alamodome in San Antonio, Texas, in the 1995 CFL season. They had relocated from Sacramento, California, where the team had been called the Sacramento Gold Miners. After relocating, the team still had the same ownership in Fred Anderson and the same staff, including President Tom Bass and Head Coach/General Manager Kay Stephenson. The Gold Miners/Texans franchise played three seasons (five if the Texans' WLAF iteration, the Sacramento Surge, is also counted) before folding in 1995. They were the southernmost team in CFL history and the only team in CFL history to have ever officially relocated from another market (the Baltimore Stallions and Montreal Alouettes are considered separate teams by the league).

== History ==
Before the 1993 season, the CFL granted expansion franchises to the owners of two WLAF teams, the Sacramento Surge and San Antonio Riders. The Riders changed their name to the Texans to avoid confusion with the Ottawa Rough Riders and Saskatchewan Roughriders. However, the original Texans franchise folded without ever playing a down when its owner, Larry Benson, ran out of money and was forced to withdraw. In a second attempt to place a team in San Antonio, Larry Ryckman threatened to move the Calgary Stampeders to San Antonio for the 1995 season if Calgary fans did not buy 16,000 season tickets; the tickets were purchased, though Ryckman was forced to sell the team a year later.

The Surge changed their name to the Gold Miners, and played the 1993 and 1994 seasons in Sacramento. However, their home stadium, Sacramento State's Hornet Stadium, was completely inadequate as a professional football venue. At the time, it consisted mostly of temporary-style bleacher seats, had few amenities and did not have permanent bathrooms. Additionally, it was uncovered, and thus offered no protection from Sacramento's blistering summer heat. They were also relatively isolated from the rest of the league; for their first two seasons, their nearest opponent was the BC Lions, 890 miles (1,430 km) north.

Unable to persuade Sacramento State to upgrade Hornet Stadium to something approaching CFL standards, Anderson tried to build a new stadium, but those plans fizzled. Neither of the other two stadiums in the Sacramento area, Toomey Field and Charles C. Hughes Stadium, offered anything significantly better; like Hornet Stadium, they were both inadequate even for temporary use. The failure of the Las Vegas Posse after only one season left the Gold Miners once again isolated from the rest of the league. Faced with an inadequate stadium and an unsustainable travel situation, Anderson reluctantly opted to move the team to San Antonio as the Texans. The move brought the Texans closer to the league's three Southern teams—the Birmingham Barracudas, Memphis Mad Dogs and Shreveport Pirates.

=== On the field ===
The Texans were unique in that their stadium, the Alamodome, had a playing surface large enough to accommodate a regulation Canadian football field. Although the facility had been designed primarily with American football in mind, its sideline seats could be retracted to create a playing surface wide enough for the full 65-yard width of a CFL field, and its end zone seating could be retracted to accommodate the full 150-yard length of a CFL field.

In their third season in the CFL and their first as the Texans, the team had the second-highest scoring offence in the league, which was led by veteran quarterback David Archer. The franchise finished the 1995 CFL season with a 12–6 record, finishing in second place of the South Division, which sent them to their first playoff berth.

In the playoffs, the Texans soundly defeated the Barracudas, 52–9, in the Southern Semi-Final at the Alamodome, in what was the only CFL playoff game ever held in an American city other than Baltimore. However, their playoff run would end with a loss to the eventual Grey Cup champion Baltimore Stallions in the Southern Final by a score of 21–11. As it turned out, it would be the last game the Texans would ever play, and (as of the 2026 season) the last meaningful CFL game ever played in the United States.

San Antonio's two backup quarterbacks had connections to the National Football League's (NFL) Buffalo Bills. The first was 45-year-old former Bills quarterback Joe Ferguson, who had retired five years earlier and came out of retirement when Dave Archer, the Texans' long-time starting quarterback, suffered an injury. The second was Jimmy Kemp, son of Bills quarterback (and politician) Jack Kemp. Head coach Kay Stephenson was Jack Kemp's backup on the Bills squad in 1968 and served as head coach of the Bills during Ferguson's last season with the team in 1984.

=== Off the field ===
The San Antonio Texans had respectable attendance, with the average being 15,855. In one of their games at the Alamodome, attendance reached 22,043, in a 38–32 loss to the Calgary Stampeders. The turmoil surrounding most of the other American CFL teams was not a significant factor in San Antonio.

=== The end ===
Anderson was heavily committed to the American CFL experiment. Indeed, by most accounts, he and the Baltimore Stallions' Jim Speros were the only truly dedicated American-based owners. When the experiment appeared to be in jeopardy near the end of the 1995 season, Anderson attempted to orchestrate a plan to save it. Under the plan, the Stallions, who were about to be forced out of Baltimore due to the pending establishment of the NFL's Baltimore Ravens, would have moved to Houston, a city that was about to lose their NFL team, the Oilers, and Speros would have sold a minority stake to Houston Astros owner Drayton McLane. Meanwhile, the Barracudas would have been sold to a new investment group and relocated to Shreveport to take the place of the Pirates. This would have matched up a team that made a good account of itself in its first season with a market that at least had the potential to support it. The 'Cudas' attendance had dwindled to unsustainable levels once college football season started. In contrast, while Shreveport was the smallest American market in the league, it had proven it could support CFL football for a full season despite being saddled with one of the league's worst teams both on and off the field. The plan would have concentrated the CFL's American experiment in the Southwest, and the three cities would have been close enough to make both it and the three teams more viable. The CFL had already planned to scrap the South Division and return to its traditional East-West lineup. The most likely alignment would have been to place the three U.S. teams in the re-constituted East Division, while the Winnipeg Blue Bombers would have returned to the West Division.

However, only two months after the Grey Cup, the Mad Dogs and Pirates had both folded. The Barracudas were about to be euthanized as well, as by then it was obvious the CFL would not approve their proposed sale and relocation to Shreveport. Speros was seriously considering moving his team to Montreal, in response to pressure from the league office. Anderson was not enamored at the prospect of being the only American owner in the CFL once again. He believed that the league needed at least three more American teams for the Texans to be viable in the long term. However, he was willing to play another season in San Antonio provided the Stallions stuck to their initial plan to move to Houston.

On February 3, 1996, the Stallions received formal approval to move to Montreal (they later reconstituted themselves as the third incarnation of the Montreal Alouettes) and the Texans were shuttered along with the Mad Dogs, Pirates and Barracudas. Anderson had little choice but to accept the permanent dissolution of his team; earlier he had stated that he'd lost $6 million in 1995—far too much to make it worth the effort to go it alone. With the Stallions' move to Montreal, his nearest opponent would have been the Hamilton Tiger-Cats, over 1,400 miles (2,300 km) away. With the Stallions opting to move to Montreal, there was no longer a viable place for Anderson to relocate had he decided to follow the Stallions' example. Although several other markets in Canada had expressed interest in joining the CFL, none had a stadium at the time that was suitable even for temporary use.

Malcolm Frank was the last remaining player from the Texans to play in the Canadian Football League when he was a member of the Edmonton Eskimos in 2006. He retired after that season.

== Seasons ==
Season	League	Finish	Wins	Losses	Ties	Playoffs
1995	CFL	2nd, South	12	6	0	Lost in Division Finals

== Players and builders of note ==
- Tom Bass
- Greg Korn – Assistant GM, Business Operations
- Mike Kiselak
- Kay Stephenson
- David Archer
- Joe Ferguson
- Jimmy Kemp
- Malcolm Frank
- Judd Garrett

== See also ==
- CFL USA all-time records and statistics
- Comparison of Canadian and American football
- 1995 CFL season
- Sacramento Gold Miners
