= Derrell Robertson =

American football player (1967–1994)

Profile
- Position: Defensive end

Personal information
- Born: September 22, 1967; Tyler, Texas
- Died: December 5, 1994 (aged 27); Dallas, Texas
- Listed height: 6 ft 7 in (2.01 m)
- Listed weight: 280 lb (127 kg)

Career information
- College: Mississippi State

Career history
- Detroit Lions (1990); Tampa Bay Buccaneers (1991)*; Las Vegas Posse (1994)
- * Offseason or practice squad member only

Derrell Robertson (September 22, 1967 – December 5, 1994) was an American college football player from Tyler, Texas who played for Mississippi State University in 1988 and 1989. After college, Robertson signed with the Las Vegas Posse of the Canadian Football League in 1994. Robertson was killed in a car crash in December 1994 but was still drafted by the Ottawa Rough Riders in a dispersal draft after the Posse folded.

== Career ==
After playing at Mississippi State, Robertson was signed by the Posse on April 7, 1994. However, he was killed in a car crash on December 5, 1994, about a month after the season ended.

After the end of the 1994 Canadian Football League season, the Posse folded, and its players were made available to the other CFL teams through a dispersal draft in April 1995. A list of potential draftees, including Robertson, was distributed by the league to the teams. With their fourth-round pick, the Ottawa Rough Riders selected Robertson. Rough Riders football operations head Garney Henley had previously consulted with the former Posse coach, Ron Meyer and had also spoken with offensive coordinator Ron Smeltzer. Both of them spoke well of Robertson, and were apparently unaware of his death, as they did not mention it. According to Ottawa coach Jim Gilstrap, the league and the team did not know about Robertson's death, until they tried and failed to find him.

== See also ==
- List of gridiron football players who died during their careers
