= A. L. Williams =

A. L. Williams may refer to:

- A. L. Williams, a financial services company now known as Primerica
- Arthur L. Williams Jr., insurance executive and founder of A. L. Williams
- A. L. Williams (American football) (born 1934), former American football coach
