= Las Vegas Posse =

Canadian Football League team

- Logo
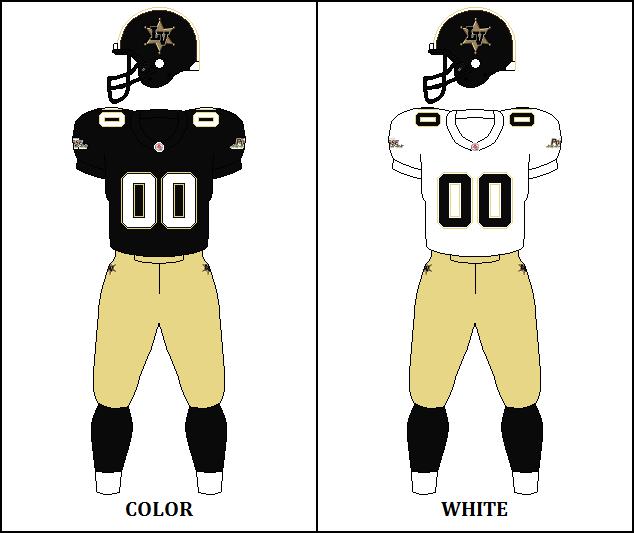
- Uniforms

General information
- Founded: 1994
- Folded: 1994
- Headquartered: Sam Boyd Silver Bowl; Las Vegas, Nevada
- Colors: Black, Desert Sand, Brown and White

Personnel
- Head coach: Ron Meyer

Team history
- Las Vegas Posse (1994)

Home fields
- Sam Boyd Silver Bowl (1994)

League / conference affiliations
- Canadian Football League (1994): West Division (1994)

The Las Vegas Posse were a Canadian Football League (CFL) team, that played at the Sam Boyd Silver Bowl in Las Vegas, Nevada, United States, in the league's 1994 season as part of the CFL's failed American expansion. Lasting only one season, the Posse were one of the least successful teams in CFL history, both on the field and off.

== History ==
=== On the field ===
The Posse had notable football talent such as KR Tamarick Vanover, RB Jon Volpe, LB Greg Battle, LB Shonte Peoples, DB/QB Darian Hagan and K Carlos Huerta, and also had rookie quarterback Anthony Calvillo, who would later go on to become the all-time leader in passing yards in all of professional football.

The franchise also had an experienced coaching staff with Head Coach Ron Meyer, who had previous coaching experiences with UNLV and in the NFL, and also had future Winnipeg Blue Bombers coach Jeff Reinebold as one of their Assistant Coaches. Carlos Huerta won the Jackie Parker Trophy as the Most Outstanding Rookie of the West Division that year.

During the team's first preseason game, against the BC Lions, Vanover signaled for a fair catch, not remembering that there is no fair catch in Canadian football, with the ball rolling into the Posse end zone, which the Lions promptly recovered it for a touchdown.

The Posse started the regular season with wins over the Sacramento Gold Miners and Saskatchewan Roughriders, but things quickly went downhill, in part due to a lack of familiarity with the Canadian game. Players also openly complained about the apathy of their coaches and teammates.

The Posse finished the season 5–13, finishing last in the West Division and next-to-last in the CFL.

=== Off the field ===
When the Posse started the 1994 season, it was clear that CFL football would not last in Las Vegas. They were owned by a publicly held corporation whose largest shareholder was Cleveland, Ohio-based Nick Mileti, former owner of MLB's Cleveland Indians, the NBA's Cleveland Cavaliers and the AHL's Cleveland Barons. Although Mileti was the public face of the ownership group, he had little direct involvement in team operations, with chairman Glenn Golenberg having more active involvement in team affairs.

The team played at Sam Boyd Stadium the then home of the UNLV Rebels in the unincorporated suburb of Whitney. As was the case with many of the other playing fields of the American CFL teams, the end zones at the stadium were only 15 yards long, instead of the usual 20 yards needed for the Canadian game. In addition, the stadium was uncovered and offered no protection from the infamous Las Vegas summer heat. Head coach Ron Meyer was seen at many practices running drills with no shirt on in the sweltering heat.

The Posse practiced on a smaller-than-regulation field (only 70 yards long) at the Riviera Casino and Resort, where a sign read "Field of ImPOSSEable Dreams." With no marketing assistance from the league and a large variety of other entertainment options in the area, local interest was virtually nonexistent.

The most memorable moment for the franchise occurred on July 8, 1994, when the team played the Sacramento Gold Miners in the first ever CFL match involving two American-based teams. The Posse defeated the Gold Miners 32–26 at Sacramento's Hornet Stadium.

There were also several infamous moments. At the team's first home game against Saskatchewan, the singer of the national anthems, Dennis Casey Parks (singing under the pseudonym "Greg Bartholomew"), sang "O Canada", which he had only begun practicing the day before after returning from performing in Japan, to the tune of "O Christmas Tree" after the music system failed. The incident prompted complaints by Canadians to the CFL, negative press for the new team, as well as a letter from Prime Minister Jean Chrétien to Posse ownership. Two weeks later, Parks was brought to a game in Hamilton where he sang it properly. On another occasion, Posse head coach Ron Meyer asked the "Showgirls" to loiter behind the bench of the BC Lions in an attempt to distract the opposition. The scheme did not work and Las Vegas lost the game 39–16.

The Posse's attendance figures were never good to begin with, but significantly tailed off as the summer wore on. Management unsuccessfully tried to sell tickets by employing tactics such as:

- Reducing ticket prices to US$9 for each seat. The few who bought season tickets for about US$750 (in more expensive categories) were given extra tickets to make up for the price difference.
- Advertising their scantily-clad cheerleaders, the "Showgirls", and by staging halftime bikini contests.

The Posse's penultimate home game against the Winnipeg Blue Bombers had an announced attendance of only 2,350 people, the lowest recorded attendance in CFL history. Several hundred of those in attendance were fans who made the trip from Winnipeg. Just before the team's last scheduled home game, against the Edmonton Eskimos, Mileti announced the team would disband due to massive losses.

The CFL, however, does not allow teams to fold in midseason. Instead, it moved the game to Edmonton's Commonwealth Stadium, citing the Posse's meager gate. Several Eskimo season ticket holders had already arrived in Las Vegas when the game was moved, and were forced to watch the game in a ballroom at the Imperial Palace when Air Canada was unable to fly them back to Edmonton on such short notice. The Posse's average attendance was a dismal 8,953.

==== Seasons ====
Season	League	Finish	Wins	Losses	Ties	Playoffs
1994	CFL	6th, West	5	13	0	No

=== In the end ===
After the season, Mileti entered talks with a group from Milwaukee led by Marvin Fishman. Fishman was looking for a way to keep professional football in Milwaukee after the Green Bay Packers, who had made been playing part of their schedule in Milwaukee for sixty seasons, announced they would play in Green Bay full time from the 1995 NFL season onward. These talks very nearly came to fruition before the Milwaukee Brewers, who objected to sharing Milwaukee County Stadium with a team that played nine home games with many of them in the summer, demanded that the Posse pay rent of $40,000 per game, well beyond what Fishman was willing to pay. The Brewers had tolerated late-season Packers home games as that team played mostly outside baseball season, but with the Packers' pending departure they wanted as few obstacles as possible to that stadium's eventual replacement with a baseball-only facility. Even though it was apparent by then that the different sizes and shapes of football and baseball fields made multipurpose stadiums inadequate for either sport, at that time single-sport stadiums were still considered an expensive novelty by many local governments and much of the public. Even after the failure of the proposed Posse move, the CFL still wanted to bring a team to Milwaukee, as it was far more ideal in terms of proximity to Canada than its other teams (and there was another still-extant stadium in the region, West Allis's Milwaukee Mile, that had the capability to host professional football).

After the failure of the Milwaukee plans, a group led by singer and business mogul Jimmy Buffett attempted to buy and relocate the franchise to Jackson, Mississippi. Buffett had gone so far as to begin assembling a front office (led by general manager Eric Tillman) and coaching staff (led by John Payne), and the CFL included the Jackson team in its 1995 draft schedule. Buffett's first managing partner, William L. Collins, had a sale contract written up before the Posse's board of directors unexpectedly raised the price of the team, prompting Collins to drop his bid. The CFL considered revoking the franchise and awarding a new expansion team to Collins, only to be threatened with a lawsuit from the Posse board of directors. Another investor for Jackson, Norton Herrick, offered an even higher price than Collins but backed out when he could not secure the money to fund the team through its expected losses. By this time, league officials had become increasingly cool toward moving to Jackson. The CFL was pressing for a U. S. television contract, and league officials did not feel that placing a team in such a small market would aid that cause.

The league then voted to suspend the Posse franchise and gave the Mileti group until December 1995 to sell the team. A dispersal draft was held for its players in 1995. Defensive end Derrell Robertson, who had been killed in a December 1994 car accident, was included; the league was unaware of Robertson's death and included him in the pool of potential draftees, and the Ottawa Rough Riders selected him. It was only after making inquiries about Robertson that the Rough Riders and the CFL discovered that Robertson had died. According to Riders coach Jim Gilstrap in a June 1995 Sports Illustrated article, "the league didn't know he was dead until we told them, and we didn't know until we couldn't find him."

The failure of the Posse also affected the team's geographically closest rival, the Sacramento Gold Miners. Before the Posse's arrival, the Miners had been nearly 900 miles (1,400 km) away from their nearest opponent, the BC Lions. The Posse's failure meant that the Gold Miners again faced the prospect of traveling extremely long distances for away games. This, along with dissatisfaction with Hornet Stadium, prompted the Miners to become the San Antonio Texans for 1995.

After the dispersal draft another group from Miami tried to purchase the remains of the Posse and move the team to Miami. The deal called for the franchise would return for the 1996 season as the Miami Manatees. In order to introduce the Miami fans to the CFL game, a pre-season game was played at the Orange Bowl between the Baltimore Stallions and the Birmingham Barracudas in 1995 (Baltimore won the game by a score of 37–0 in front of 20,216 fans). Unlike the Mississippi proposals, the Manatees would have retained the services of Meyer as head coach. However, the deal fell apart when the CFL ended its American experiment after the 1995 season. The last active player from the Las Vegas Posse (or any American CFL franchise) was quarterback Anthony Calvillo, who last played for the Montreal Alouettes in 2013.

=== After the Posse ===
The Posse was the first attempt by one of the major professional sports leagues in North America to place a team in Las Vegas proper. Las Vegas had only ascended to major-city status in the 1980s, and even after that most major leagues traditionally avoided it due in part to its gambling reputation. Future professional football leagues would place teams in Las Vegas, with the first XFL's Las Vegas Outlaws, the Arena League's Las Vegas Sting, Las Vegas Gladiators and Las Vegas Outlaws, the 2009 UFL's Las Vegas Locomotives, and the second XFL's Vegas Vipers all residing in the city. The XFL Outlaws and Locomotives did somewhat better drawing fans to Sam Boyd Stadium than the Posse did, although both experienced steep declines as the years went on (to the point where the Locomotives were drawing fewer than the Posse by the end of their run). They also had better on-field performance, particularly the Locomotives, who played in all three championship games the UFL had and won two of them. In the early 2000's, Las Vegas, which has been home to a Triple-A Pacific Coast League team since 1983 was briefly considered by Major League Baseball as a potential new home for the Montreal Expos (who were soon to relocate) but in the end they would move to Washington, D.C. to become the Washington Nationals. However, in 2016 MLB Commissioner Rob Manfred said the city was a "viable alternative" for a potential expansion team.

Major league sports interest in Las Vegas would ultimately culminate when the National Hockey League 21 years later awarded the city an expansion team known as the Vegas Golden Knights which began play for the 2017–18 NHL season. The Golden Knights would go on to become the most successful expansion team in North American sports history and make it to the 2018 Stanley Cup Final in their very first season only to lose (in five games) to the Washington Capitals. Major league professional football finally settled in the area for good when the NFL's Oakland Raiders relocated to Las Vegas and began play in the city in 2020 playing in Allegiant Stadium in Paradise, Nevada, which replaced Sam Boyd, making Las Vegas the second former CFL city (after Baltimore) to become home to an NFL franchise. A National Basketball Association expansion franchise is scheduled to begin play in October 2027, and the Athletics, who previously played in Oakland (1968-2024), Kansas City (1955-67) and Philadelphia (1901-54), of MLB are scheduled to move into a new stadium in 2028.

== Players and builders of note ==
=== Retired ===
- Ron Meyer (head coach; deceased)
- Jon Volpe
- Greg Battle
- Shonte Peoples
- Darian Hagan
- Carlos Huerta
- Tamarick Vanover
- Anthony Calvillo
- Dan Sileo

=== Active in the CFL ===
- Jeff Reinebold

== See also ==
- CFL USA all-time records and statistics
- Comparison of Canadian and American football
- 1994 CFL season
