= Shreveport Pirates =

Former Canadian Football League team

- Logo
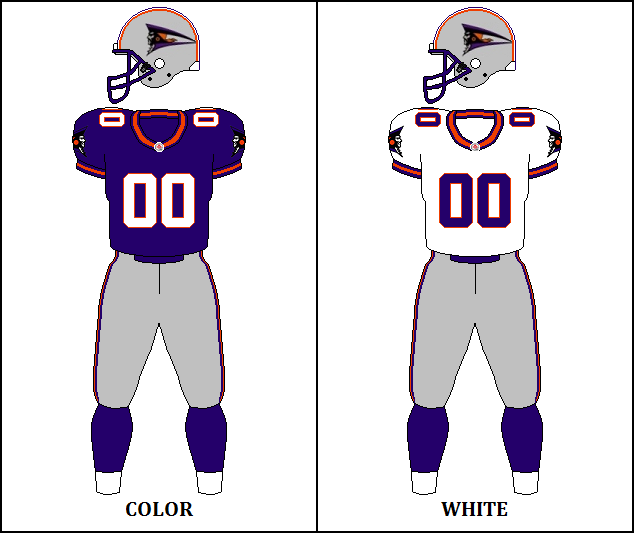
- Uniforms

General information
- Founded: 1994
- Folded: 1995
- Stadium: Independence Stadium
- Headquartered: Shreveport, Louisiana, U.S.
- Colours: Purple, orange, silver, black, and white

Personnel
- Owners: Bernard Glieberman; Lonnie Glieberman
- General manager: J.I. Albrecht
- Head coach: John Huard; Forrest Gregg

League / conference affiliations
- Canadian Football League: East Division (1994); South Division (1995)

The Shreveport Pirates were a Canadian Football League team, playing at Independence Stadium in Shreveport, Louisiana, United States. They were established in 1994 as part of the CFL's expansion into the United States and disbanded upon the end of the CFL's American experiment after the 1995 season. Although they were based in a small market and barely competitive on the field, the Pirates enjoyed relatively strong local fan support.

== History ==
The Pirates were created when Bernard Glieberman and his son Lonie, owners of the Ottawa Rough Riders, expressed a desire to move the struggling franchise to the United States. The CFL rejected this move, but engineered a deal in which the Rough Riders were essentially split in two. The Gliebermans received an expansion franchise in Shreveport, while a new ownership group took over the Rough Riders name, colours, and history.

General manager J. I. Albrecht hired John Huard as head coach, but the Gliebermans overruled him and installed Forrest Gregg as coach before the team took its first snap. They needed until week 15 to record their first victory, a 24–12 win over the Sacramento Gold Miners. After the historic victory, the team won two out of their last three games, but they still finished last in the CFL East Division with a 3–15 record. Albrecht resigned and sued Glieberman and the Pirates.

Top performers were wide receiver Charles Thompson with 641 yards receiving and three touchdowns and running back Martin Patton was the team leading rusher with 659 yards and eight touchdowns. Terrence Jones had 1,046 yards passing with four touchdowns and nine interceptions and Mike Johnson, of the University of Akron, passed for 1,259 yards and four touchdowns with 12 interceptions. The club averaged 17,871 fans per game (second-highest of the American teams, behind only Baltimore), and once the team snapped its losing streak, attendance rose near the end of the season, with a high of 32,011 for their season-ending victory over the Ottawa Rough Riders, a single-game attendance record for the American teams outside of Baltimore.

Shreveport averaged more than 26 points per game in 1995, but gave up more than 28 en route to a 5–13 record. Billy Joe Tolliver completed 252 of 429 passes for 3,440 yards and 14 touchdowns. His favorite target was fellow Texas Tech product Wayne Walker, who caught 51 passes for 790 yards. Curtis Mayfield led the team in receptions with 58 for 846 receiving yards and two touchdowns. The team's leading rusher was former University of Miami player Martin Patton, who ran for 1,040 yards, third in the league. Kicker Björn Nittmo finished 46 of 53 in field goals and was sixth in the league in scoring.

== Fan support ==
Despite their dreadful on-field record and the Gliebermans' mismanagement, the Pirates had a very loyal following. Shreveport was by far the smallest U.S. market to host a CFL team, and second smallest in the entire league after Regina, Saskatchewan. Also, the Shreveport market had four major college teams with large fan bases in the region–LSU, Texas, Texas A&M, and Arkansas. On paper, this should have resulted in attendance severely dropping off once college football started, as was the case with the CFL's other Southern teams, the Memphis Mad Dogs and Birmingham Barracudas. However, Shreveport was far enough away from the campuses of LSU, Texas, Texas A&M, and Arkansas that high school football was the Pirates' biggest local sports competition in the second half of the season. As such, despite winning only eight games in their history, the Pirates' attendance remained roughly comparable with the established Canadian teams throughout their run.

== Demise ==
The problems continued off the field as the Gliebermans tried to relocate the team to Norfolk, Virginia. However, officials there broke off talks after learning that Glieberman faced several lawsuits in Shreveport. Notable about the move to Virginia was "the Great Tucker Caper" when the City of Shreveport tried to seize Bernard Glieberman's 1948 Tucker (which was on loan to a classic automobile museum in downtown Shreveport) for defaulting on debts related to the Pirates' lease at Independence Stadium, including payments for the scoreboard. Glieberman's lawyer, Mark Gilliam, tried to escape with the car and hide the vintage auto, but he ran out of gas along the way. The police spotted him, and took the car back to the museum where it was being stored until the case could be settled. Norfolk was not interested in the team in any event due to the Gliebermans' poor business record.

By the end of 1995, anticipating that the Pirates would not continue beyond that season, a group of investors dubbing itself the "Ark-La-Tex Football Association" proposed purchasing the Barracudas and moving them to Shreveport. The Barracudas had compiled a winning record and made the playoffs, winning two more games than the Pirates had won in their entire existence. However, owner Art Williams had already decided not to bring the team back to Alabama once it became clear the Barracudas could not successfully compete with the state's well-established college football programs for an audience late in the season. The Ark-La-Tex Football association bought the 'Cudas from Williams for a significant discount, provided that the league approve the sale. The sale would have brought the team closer to the San Antonio Texans and what would have been the Houston Stallions (as Baltimore had proposed moving to Houston after the season) and created a three-team nucleus that would have made the CFL's long-term presence in the U.S. viable. It would have also matched a team that made a good account of itself on the field with a market that was at least potentially capable of supporting it at the box office.

Instead, on February 2, 1996, the CFL folded four of its American franchises and allowed the owners of the fifth, the Stallions, to resurrect the Montreal Alouettes, ending the CFL's experiment south of the border.

== Aftermath ==
The Gliebermans eventually re-emerged in the CFL owning the Ottawa Renegades. Like their previous efforts, the Renegades were a failure.

Some notable players include former New Orleans Saints running back Gill Fenerty and defensive end Dexter Manley. Kicker Björn Nittmo was also a fan favorite, both for making some very long field goals and for being friendly to the fans, often attending meetings of their booster club. Jon Heidenreich played two seasons with the club, and later became popular as a wrestler (WWC Universal Heavyweight Championship). Two players, Joe Montford and Elfrid Payton, later went on to fame as winners of the CFL's Most Outstanding Defensive Player Award (added to this pair is Greg Stumon, who was a former winner of the same award). Uzooma Okeke went on to become one of the best linemen in the history of the Montreal Alouettes and won the 1999 CFL Most Outstanding Lineman award. He became a scout with the Alouettes in 2007.

The Pirates booster club was formed during the team's first season to support the team, and remained active long after the team became defunct, spearheading various later attempts to get another professional football team in the Shreveport area. The last such professional outdoor team to play in the area would be the Shreveport Knights, who played one season in the Regional Football League in 1999; all of the other efforts to launch a professional league (both XFLs, both UFLs, the 2020s USFL, the AAF, and, to date, the Continental) either rejected or never seriously considered playing there. Professional football in the Shreveport area has otherwise been limited to arena football.

The Pirates' 14-game losing streak to start the 1994 season went unmatched until the 2026 Ottawa Redblacks lost their first 16 games.

== Seasons ==
Season	League	Finish	Wins	Losses	Ties	Playoffs
1994	CFL	6th, East	3	15	0	
1995	CFL	5th, South	5	13	0	

== See also ==
- CFL USA all-time records and statistics
- Comparison of Canadian and American football
- 1994 CFL season
- 1995 CFL season
