= CFL USA all-time records and statistics =

This list combines the statistics and records of the seven CFL American teams from 1993 to 1995: Baltimore Stallions, Birmingham Barracudas, Las Vegas Posse, Memphis Mad Dogs, Sacramento Gold Miners, San Antonio Texans, and the Shreveport Pirates. Though no city lasted more than 2 years in the CFL, they combined for 10 seasons of team statistics, including several record breaking performances.

== Scoring ==
Most points – CFL USA career

- 406 – Roman Anderson (1994–95)
- 385 – Carlos Huerta (1994–95)

Most points – season

- 235 – Roman Anderson – San Antonio – 1995
- 228 – Carlos Huerta – Baltimore – 1995
- 184 – Donald Igwebuike – Baltimore - 1994
- 171 – Roman Anderson – Sacramento – 1994
- 157 – Carlos Huerta – Las Vegas – 1994
- 156 – Jim Crouch – Sacramento – 1993
- 144 – Luis Zendejas – Birmingham – 1995

Most points – game

- 30 – Martin Patton – Shreveport versus Winnipeg, August 5, 1995

Most touchdowns – CFL USA career

- 34 – Mike Pringle

Most touchdowns – season

- 18 – Chris Armstrong – Baltimore - 1994

Most touchdowns – game

- 5 – Martin Patton – Shreveport versus Winnipeg, August 5, 1995

== Passing ==
Most passing yards – CFL USA career

- 13,834 – David Archer (1993–95)
- 7,705 – Tracy Ham (1994–95)

Most passing yards – season

- 6,023 – David Archer – Sacramento – 1993
- 4,911 – Matt Dunigan – Birmingham – 1995
- 4,471 – David Archer – San Antonio – 1995
- 4,348 – Tracy Ham – Baltimore – 1994
- 3,767 – Billy Joe Tolliver – Shreveport - 1995
- 3,357 – Tracy Ham – Baltimore – 1994
- 3,340 – David Archer – Sacramento - 1994
- 3,211 – Damon Allen – Memphis - 1995
- 2,582 – Anthony Calvillo – Las Vegas – 1994
- 1,812 – Kerwin Bell – Sacramento - 1994
- 1,259 – Mike Johnson – Shreveport – 1994
- 1,222 – Len Williams – Las Vegas – 1994
- 1,193 – Rickey Foggie – Memphis - 1995
- 1,046 – Terrence Jones – Shreveport - 1994

Most passing yards – game

- 551 - Anthony Calvillo – Las Vegas versus Ottawa, Sept. 3, 1994

Most passing touchdowns – CFL USA career

- 86 – David Archer (1993–95)
- 51 – Tracy Ham (1994–95)
- 34 – Matt Dunigan (1995)

Most passing touchdowns – season

- 35 – David Archer – Sacramento - 1993
- 34 – Matt Dunigan – Birmingham - 1995
- 30 – Tracy Ham – Baltimore – 1994
- 30 – David Archer – San Antonio – 1995

== Rushing ==
Most rushing yards – CFL USA career

- 4,131 – Mike Pringle (1994–95)

Most rushing yards – season (all 1,000 yard rushers included)

- 1,972 – Mike Pringle – Baltimore - 1994
- 1,791 – Mike Pringle – Baltimore – 1995
- 1,230 – Troy Mills – Sacramento – 1994
- 1,040 – Martin Patton – Shreveport -1995
- 1,030 – Mike Saunders – San Antonio - 1995

Most rushing yards – game

- 232 – Mike Pringle – Baltimore versus Shreveport, Sep. 3, 1994
- 230 – Troy Mills – Sacramento versus Ottawa, Oct. 24, 1994

== Receiving ==
Most receiving yards – CFL USA career

- 2,697 – Chris Armstrong (1994–95)
- 2,677 – Rod Harris (1993–94)

Most receiving yards – CFL USA season

- 1,586 – Chris Armstrong – Baltimore – 1994
- 1,559 – Marcus Grant – Birmingham – 1995
- 1,415 – Joe Horn – Memphis – 1995
- 1,397 - Rod Harris – Sacramento – 1993
- 1,280 - Rod Harris – Sacramento – 1994
- 1,202 - Curtis Mayfield – Las Vegas – 1994
- 1,111 – Chris Armstrong – Baltimore - 1995
- 1,101 – Jason Phillips – Birmingham – 1995
- 1,074 – Titus Dixon – Sacramento – 1993

Most receiving yards – game

- 319 – Curtis Mayfield – Las Vegas versus Ottawa, September 3, 1994

Most receptions – CFL USA career

- 184 – Rod Harris (1993–95)

Most receptions – season

- 90 - Rod Harris – Sacramento – 1993
- 86 - Rod Harris – Sacramento – 1994
- 84 – Marcus Grant – Birmingham – 1995
- 76 – Jason Phillips – Birmingham – 1995
- 72 – Chris Armstrong – Baltimore – 1994
- 71 – Joe Horn – Memphis – 1995
- 64 – Chris Armstrong – Baltimore - 1995
- 61 – Titus Dixon – Sacramento – 1993
- 61 - Curtis Mayfield – Las Vegas - 1994
- 61 – Troy Mills - Sacramento - 1994
- 60 – Mark Stock – San Antonio – 1995
- 58 - Curtis Mayfield – Shreveport - 1995

Most receptions – game

- 14 - Curtis Mayfield – Las Vegas versus Ottawa, September 3, 1994
