= Arthur L. Williams Jr. =

American insurance executive (born 1942)

- Born: April 26, 1942 (age 84); Waycross, Georgia, U.S.
- Occupation: Retired
- Title: Founder, CEO chairman of A.L. Williams Corporation
- Spouse: Angela Williams
- Children: 2

Arthur L. "Art" Williams Jr. (born April 26, 1942) is an American insurance executive living in Palm Beach, Florida. He is the founder of A.L. Williams & Associates, known as Primerica Financial Services since 1991. He also ventured into professional sports, owning the Birmingham Barracudas of the Canadian Football League (CFL) and the Tampa Bay Lightning of the National Hockey League (NHL) for brief periods.

== Early life and education ==
Williams was born on April 26, 1942 in Waycross, Georgia. He obtained his bachelor's degree in arts and sciences at Mississippi State University in Starkville, Mississippi and his master's degree in science from Auburn University.

== Career ==
In 1965, Williams's father suddenly died of a heart attack. He had a whole life insurance policy that left their family underinsured. Five years later Art Williams' cousin Ted Harrison introduced him to the concept of term life insurance, a simpler alternative to whole life which requires less cashflow and which, at that time, was almost never sold and rarely heard of outside the insurance industry. Williams was taken aback by the idea of not knowing that there was a choice when buying life insurance and described the whole conversation as "disturbing," recalling his father's death and referring to the fact that people had no idea of such a product. Believing that families were paying too much for whole life policies that left them poor in the wallet and deeply underinsured, Williams joined his cousin at ITT Financial Services in 1970. In June 1973, six months before ITT went out of business, he left and went on board with Waddell & Reed, another Buy term and invest the difference (BTID) company that saw early success.

Williams gained momentum at W&R and became regional vice-president (RVP) the same year, with a sales force that covered 6 states. Despite the numerous benefits of working at W&R in comparison to ITT, it became clear to Williams that with a corporate structure in which the executives, not the sales force, owned the company, financial decisions would always have priority over the clients and there would be limits on how much the company could grow.

On February 10, 1977, Williams and 85 associates founded their own company A.L. Williams & Associates on a simple philosophy: "Buy Term and Invest the Difference." He convinced many customers to switch from their conventional whole-life insurance to term policies. The company's rapid growth to become the largest seller of life insurance in the U.S. was enhanced by his emphasis on promoting his people. He was one of the first to have weekly video conferences on the company's private television broadcast system. This allowed him to personally speak to each of his 225,000 plus agents and to create a family feeling that inspired them to become Financially Independent. A.L. Williams became Primerica Financial Services.

Williams made a large portion of his fortune from investments, particularly in Citigroup, in which he owned 21 million shares as of 2007.

Williams purchased and entirely renovated the old Edwards Inn and Spa in Highlands, North Carolina, spending nearly forty million dollars. The inn went from being relatively unknown to the #4 hotel according to Tripadvisor in 2012.

== Sports ownership ==
=== Birmingham Barracudas ===
Williams first entered the ranks of sports ownership in 1995, when he was granted a Canadian Football League (CFL) expansion franchise for Birmingham, Alabama. He wanted a team nickname that would "scare the spit out of people," and chose the Barracudas moniker for his franchise.

Like many owners of the CFL's newer American franchises, Williams was in way over his head, being unfamiliar with Canadian football. He felt Birmingham was a logical choice to place his franchise, due to the popularity of football in the state of Alabama. The results of his venture, however, told a different story. Fan support and attendance for home games were initially strong during the summer months, but declined considerably when the NFL, NCAA, and high school football seasons started. Knowing the 'Cudas could not even begin to go head-to-head with Alabama and Auburn football, Williams persuaded the CFL to allow the Barracudas to play their September and October home games on Sundays. This was not nearly enough to prevent a steep decline at the gate. Williams estimated he spent $10 million to launch the Barracudas franchise, and lost a substantial amount throughout the course of the season.

Williams was outspoken in his criticism of the CFL and its style of play, and along with the other American team owners wanted changes made to several league rules. Amongst these requests were to reduce the size of a CFL field and alter gameplay to match American football standards, and to change the name of the league to better reflect the presence of American teams. He strongly petitioned the CFL to move the season to the spring months, as he was unwilling to risk another season going head-to-head with the other American football leagues, especially college football.

When the league refused to comply with his requests, Williams decided to sell the Barracudas to a group of investors called Ark-La-Tex Football Association, which intended to move the team to Shreveport as a replacement for the Shreveport Pirates, which had collapsed under the mismanagement of owner Bernard Glieberman. The transaction proposal was for $750,000. Williams said it was a significant loss, based on his own estimates. The league rejected the sale and opted to contract the remaining American franchises prior to the 1996 season instead.

=== Tampa Bay Lightning ===
In 1998, Williams returned to sports ownership when he purchased the National Hockey League's Tampa Bay Lightning from Kokusai Green for $117 million, outbidding Detroit Pistons owner William Davidson for the franchise.

Williams was visible and outspoken during the early stages of his ownership of the Lightning. He cleared the majority of the team's debt, which was $102 million at the time of the sale, and added an additional $6 million to the player payroll, allowing the team to acquire established players such as Wendel Clark, Craig Janney, and Bill Ranford. This would be a stark contrast to Kokusai Green's bargain-basement approach to running the team.

The Lightning drafted Vincent Lecavalier with the first overall pick at the 1998 NHL entry draft, whom Williams declared to be "The Michael Jordan of hockey." The statement drew heavy criticism in hockey circles, as it placed lofty expectations on the young forward in addition to revealing how little Williams knew about the sport.

As with his time in the CFL, Williams was seen as being in way over his head as an NHL owner. His lack of knowledge about hockey, combined with his thick Southern accent and fundamentalist Christian views, made him an easy target for ridicule from his NHL colleagues, who often referred him as "Jed Clampett" behind his back. Williams did not smoke or drink, and used words like "goldangit" in place of profanities.

On the ice, Williams's lone season as team owner was mired in chaos. Despite publicly assuring general manager Phil Esposito and assistant general manager Tony Esposito their jobs were safe, Williams fired them two games into the 1998–99 season, giving head coach Jacques Demers exclusive control of the team's hockey operations as both coach and general manager. The team would record a ten-game losing streak early in the season, all but ending any chance of making the playoffs. The Lightning finished the season at 19–54–9.

By the spring of 1999, the team's on-ice performance, along with the turmoil in the front office and long-term financial situation proved to be too much to handle. Williams stopped attending games after the Lightning hosted 1999 NHL All-Star Game in January. He would go on to explain his refusal for being as visible as he was in the early stages of his ownership was his disappointment regarding the venture, citing "this team broke my heart". Williams lost $20 million in the 1998–99 season alone, which was more in one year as he estimated he could have lost in five years. Williams eventually sold the team to Davidson, whom he outbid a year earlier for $115 million, which was $2 million less than his original purchase price.

== Wealth ==
In 1998, he saved Liberty University in Virginia, donating $70 million and erasing decades of debt. He stated that "My wife and I always knew God wanted us to do something special with our money".

The money donated to Liberty was used, in large part, to build a football stadium.

During the 2008 financial crisis, the value of his Citi shares (which he acquired as payment for selling off Art Williams Insurance) plunged by $800 million. He later sued over this loss, but lost his case. That represented a large portion of his net worth.

== See also ==
- List of billionaires
- Williams Stadium

Sporting positions
Preceded by Phil Esposito	Tampa Bay Lightning owner 1998–1999	Succeeded by Bill Davidson
