= Fred Anderson (gridiron football owner) =

Fred Anderson (died March 1997) was a Sacramento, California based businessman and sports entrepreneur.

== Business and philanthropy ==
Anderson's wealth was self-made. In February 1953, he and his wife Patricia founded Anderson Lumber. It would become Pacific Coast Building Products (PCBP) and eventually expanded to include the manufacturing, contracting, and distributing of building materials. As the company grew, the Andersons undertook philanthropic efforts, sponsoring a wide variety of health and youth initiatives and giving millions to local organizations. An $18 million gift to establish the Anderson Lucchetti Women's and Children's Center at the Sutter Medical Center ranks as the single largest gift from an individual family to any capital project in the Sacramento area. A passion for sports emerged with the sponsorship of a local air show and golfing events.

== Sports ownership ==
In 1991 and 1992 Anderson was owner of the Sacramento Surge of the World League of American Football. The Surge were victors in the second edition of the World Bowl, defeating the Orlando Thunder 21–17 in Montreal.

The league went dormant after these two seasons but Anderson was able to repurpose his team as a Canadian Football League (CFL) expansion club, now renamed the Sacramento Gold Miners. They were the first American-based team in the CFL. The team had two modestly successful years in Sacramento with attendance in the 15,000 range but faced issues with the bare bones Hornet Stadium and relative isolation as other American teams came and went. When these problems proved insurmountable, Anderson moved the team to San Antonio for the 1995 season where they were renamed the Texans. As the Texans, they made the playoffs for the first time.

By the end of the 1995 season the other American owners had either folded or, in the case of Baltimore, moved. By his own estimate, Anderson had lost $6 million during the season—far too much to make it worth the effort to go it alone. Anderson decided to fold his own franchise, ending the CFL's four-year effort to gain a footing in the United States. Notably, Anderson is the only American owner to have persisted with the expansion effort from beginning to end. In his chronicle of the CFL American expansion, Willes describes Anderson as a rock and suggests the expansion might have worked had the league found more owners like him. He was "one of the real heroes of this forgotten era."

Although football was his main passion, Anderson's holdings were varied. He held a minority stake in the Pittsburgh Pirates and Sacramento Kings. Also in the mid-1990s, Anderson was owner of the Modesto A's, a farm team of the Oakland Athletics. He is reported to have planned to move the team to Sacramento, but this did not come to fruition.

Anderson died in March 1997. His wife Patricia died in 2008.
