= Miami Manatees (CFL) =

Proposed Canadian Football League (CFL) team

Logo

General information
- Founded: 1995
- Folded: 1996
- Headquartered: Miami, Florida, U.S.

League / conference affiliations
- Canadian Football League

The Miami Manatees was a proposed Canadian Football League (CFL) team scheduled to begin play in the 1996 season, and had plans to play out of the Miami Orange Bowl in Miami, Florida. After looking at a possible expansion franchise, the decision to relocate the Las Vegas Posse to Miami became the preferred choice to land a CFL team in Miami. The team never came to fruition as the CFL suspended its U.S. operations in spring 1996.

== History ==
By March 1995, an investment group that originally sought to relocate the defunct Las Vegas Posse franchise announced their intention to pursue an expansion franchise to begin play in the 1996 season. At this time the name Miami Manatees was officially submitted to the CFL, and the team announced that a portion ticket sales would go to a fund to help save Florida's manatees. The team even adopted a manatee named Gamzo. To be coached by Ron Meyer, the team needed to sell 20,000 to 25,000 tickets per game to break even.

Although previously stating that an expansion franchise would be preferred, the Miami ownership group sought to purchase the Las Vegas team after deals to relocate to Jackson, Mississippi, and Los Angeles, California, fell through. The cost of buying the Las Vegas franchise was estimated at $1.45 million as opposed to a $3 million expansion fee. Following an exhibition at the Orange Bowl between the Baltimore Stallions and the Birmingham Barracudas that drew an announced 20,250 spectators, the ownership group continued its pursuit to relocate the Posse franchise. The pursuit of the franchise would end in Spring 1996 when the CFL suspended its U.S. operations thus ending the prospect of the CFL playing in Miami.

Had the league gone forward with American teams in the 1996 season, the Manatees would have been the only CFL team to compete directly in an NFL market (the Baltimore Stallions refused to do so and moved to Montreal to become the revived Montreal Alouettes; had Baltimore stayed in the U.S. it would have relocated to recently vacated Houston).
