= Jim Speros =

American businessman (born 1959)

- Born: February 17, 1959 (age 67)
- Education: Clemson University
- Spouse: Ellen Speros
- Children: 3
- Parent(s): Leo and Linda Speros

Jim Speros (born February 17, 1959) is an American businessman and former American football player and coach from Great Falls, Virginia, (Fairfax County), best known for his ownership of teams in the southern American expansion phase of the Canadian Football League and United Football League.

== Early career ==
Speros is an alumnus of Clemson University in Clemson, South Carolina, where he was a member of the football team from 1977 to 1981. Speros played linebacker and defensive line while at Clemson University and later served as a graduate assistant on their coaching staff. Speros was a member of the 1978 Gator Bowl winning team, and the 1981 National Championship team during his time at Clemson. After winning the National Championship with the Tigers, Speros took an assistant coaching position with the Washington Redskins in 1982 under head coach Joe Gibbs. In Speros' first year as an assistant coach with the Redskins in 1982, they defeated the Miami Dolphins 27–17 in Super Bowl XVII. In Speros' second year with Washington, the 1983 Redskins won the NFC Championship before falling to the Raiders in Super Bowl XVIII. In 1984 Speros accepted a coaching position with the Buffalo Bills, where he served from 1984 to 1985.

== Baltimore CFL Colts/Stallions ownership ==
In 1993, the Canadian Football League finalized their six-team expansion into the United States, with Speros being named the Owner and Team President of the Baltimore CFL Colts (later known as the Baltimore Stallions), the most successful team from the Canadian football league expansion south to the United States. The Stallions' success was due in large part to Speros' involvement. He managed to build a successful franchise in Baltimore with crowds that consistently topped 30,000 at the renovated four-decade old Memorial Stadium on 33rd Street in northeast Baltimore over its two-year existence. During his time with the Stallions, Speros also served as Vice Chairman of the Canadian Football League under commissioner Larry Smith.

The Stallions were a runaway success on the field as well. He knew that Canadian football was very different from the American game, and stocked the Stallions with CFL veterans. This approach paid off very well, as the Stallions advanced all the way to the Grey Cup final in both seasons, winning it in 1995–Baltimore's first major-sports title since the Orioles won the 1983 World Series. The 1995 Baltimore Stallions were the first American franchise in the CFL to win the Grey Cup, and as of 2024 are still the only American based team to win the CFL championship in the leagues 100+ year history.

However, Speros' ambitious ownership of the Stallions would not last long. During the 1995 Grey Cup playoffs, the Cleveland Browns under long-time owner Art Modell, announced plans to move to Baltimore. The resulting dispute ultimately resulted in the Browns' franchise being suspended for four years, while the Browns' players and personnel moved to Baltimore and were renamed as the Baltimore Ravens. Although the Stallions had been a hit, Speros knew that they could not even begin to compete with an NFL team. Rather than face being effectively reduced to "minor league" status (as he put it years later), Speros moved the team to Montreal to become the current incarnation of the Alouettes. However, the CFL refused to let Speros' team keep their legacy as the Stallions, though it allowed him to reclaim the history and records of the previous two incarnations of the Alouettes. According to official CFL records, Speros is reckoned as having canceled his franchise in Baltimore and "reactivated" the dormant 1946-86 Alouettes franchise. After moving to Montreal, Speros' Alouettes franchise continued their success, making it to the CFL Eastern Conference Finals for the third consecutive year. Although the team continued their winning ways, compiling a 12–6 record by the end of the 1996 Season, Speros decided to sell the Montreal franchise to Robert C. Wetenhall in early 1997 to pursue other business and sports ownership opportunities in the United States, and handed over the title of Team President to Larry Smith.

== United Football League involvement ==
In May 2010, Speros rejected an overture to buy the United Football League's Florida Tuskers. In June 2010 he was named as the owner of the Virginia Destroyers, an expansion team set to begin play in Norfolk, Virginia, in 2011. Speros named former Washington Commanders quarterback Doug Williams as the team's general manager. In late August 2010, Speros backed out of negotiations due to multiple flaws in the contracts presented to him as well as the league structure. Speros specifically cited the inability for him to acquire an entire franchise instead of investing in a single-entity league. However, Speros said he remained open to purchasing the team if terms changed, and that he continued to support the league's efforts in the region. In January 2011, the league contracted the Tuskers and moved all of its staff to Virginia to form the Destroyers' core; in August 2012, the league contracted the Hartford Colonials and assigned that team's owner, Bill Mayer, as the Destroyers' owner after failing to find an owner to replace Speros.

== Restaurants ==
Speros, who grew up in the restaurant business, is the founder and owner of several upscale sports restaurants in the Northern Virginia area. His initial concept, Velocity Five, had locations in Falls Church, Centreville, Sterling, Landsdowne, and in Arlington.

After being nationally nominated in the foodservice industry and winning multiple awards regionally in the Washington D.C. area for Chicken Wings, Speros decided to invest in a concept with the Velocity Five franchise that was more focused on buffalo style chicken wings, changing the name from Velocity Five to Velocity Wings in 2013, while expanding to opening eight locations under the Velocity Wings brand. As of 2024, these restaurants are located in South Riding, Purcellville, Sterling, Lovettsville, Haymarket, Bristow, Manassas, and Fairfax.

After the initial success of Velocity Wings in the Washington, D.C. area, Speros continued to pursue new restaurant ventures in Northern Virginia, opening two new restaurant concepts since the inception of Velocity Wings in 2013. Social House Kitchen and Tap, a beer-centric restaurant with an eclectic food menu, was founded in 2017, and Locals Tacos and Tequila, a taqueria which focuses on craft tequila and margaritas opened its first location in 2020.

In October 2022, after growing 13 restaurants under 3 different brands, Speros' Velocity Restaurant and Hospitality Group formed a partnership with multi-national food corporation, Thompson Hospitality, based in Reston. Currently the three brands are continuing their expansion and growth in the greater Washington, D.C. area.

== Other ==
Speros served as chairman, President and CEO of Chalk, Inc., a publicly traded company, from 2005 through 2008. He served on the Board of Directors from 2000 through 2008. Chalk, an industry leader in mobile learning management systems was sold to Research in Motion (RIM)/Blackberry in January 2009. He also served for twelve years (1998–2010) as member of the Board of Directors of Braintech, Inc., a publicly traded vision guided robotics company.

Prior to his affiliation with Chalk, Speros was president and chief executive officer of Sideware Systems, Inc., a customer relationship management software company which traded publicly in the United States and Canada. Under Speros’ leadership, the company had twelve offices across North America and reached a market capitalization of $1.8 billion. Their customer list included several Fortune 500 companies.

Speros is a founding partner, owner and served as Vice Chairman of National Capital Golf Ventures, LLC, a privately held golf and real estate development company with properties in the Mid Atlantic.

In addition to his other ventures, he served as President of Champions Sports, Inc., a publicly traded restaurant corporation, from 1989 to 1993. Champion's Sports had 37 restaurant locations nationwide before being sold to the Marriott Corporation in 1993.

Speros’ sports background also includes serving as a Partner and Chairman of the Ownership Committee for American Baseball Capital, a group vying to purchase a Major League Baseball team in the Northern Virginia region. Specifically, Arlington, Virginia. The group was a finalist and was recognized for their long dedication to bringing the "great American pastime" back to the Washington Capital region. In 2005 Major League Baseball awarded the Washington Nationals to Washington, D.C.

In August 2012, Speros was named to the board of directors for the Washington, D.C.–based Military Bowl.

== Personal life ==
He and his wife, Ellen, have three children and two grandchildren. Their son, Jimmy Speros, played football for the University of Richmond, winning two CAA Football Championships before winning two Golden Gloves boxing championships in 2016 and 2018, and is currently coaching football at his former high school, Flint Hill School, in Oakton. Their daughter, Alexa, graduated from Ohio University and served in management for the Velocity Restaurant and Hospitality Group in the development and opening of the Tacos and Tequila brand. Their youngest, Justin Speros, graduated from his father's alma mater Clemson University. Justin served as an assistant coach for the Tigers football team, winning two College Football National Championships. After his time as an assistant coach at Clemson University, Justin went on to serve on coaching staffs for the University of South Florida, Western Carolina University, and the Cleveland Browns. Justin is now the Director of Recruiting, as well as the Professional Football Liaison at the University of Virginia.

Speros' father, Leo, played running back at The University of Maryland at College Park from 1951 to 1954. His brothers, Pete and George, also played college football. Pete, an All-American at Penn State, was drafted by the Seattle Seahawks in the 1983 NFL draft. George played linebacker at Temple. Speros' nephew, Chris, played alongside Jimmy at the University of Richmond.

Speros is a 1977 graduate from St. John's College High School, a Christian Brothers Roman Catholic high school in Washington, D.C.
