= Martin Patton =

American gridiron football player (1970–2012)

Profile
- Position: Running back

Personal information
- Born: October 21, 1970; Missouri City, Texas, U.S.
- Died: November 20, 2012 (aged 42); Shelby County, Texas, U.S.
- Listed height: 6 ft 0 in (1.83 m)
- Listed weight: 205 lb (93 kg)

Career information
- College: Texas A&I

Career history
- 1994–95: Shreveport Pirates
- 1996: Winnipeg Blue Bombers

Martin Patton (October 21, 1970 – November 20, 2012) was a running back in the Canadian Football League (CFL).

Originally playing with the powerhouse University of Miami Hurricanes, Patton ran into legal trouble. He received probation for credit card fraud and later had an altercation with police after a car accident (Patton lost most of his family in automotive accidents). His promising opportunity ended when he was dropped by the Hurricanes and he finished his college at Texas A&I. He led the Javelinas in rushing yards, with 876, in 1992 and was a Lone Star Conference all-star.

He played professional football with the CFL and the expansion Shreveport Pirates in 1994, leading the team with 659 rushing yards and 8 touchdowns. In 1995, he rushed for over 1,000 yards (1040) and was 3rd best rusher in the league. He finished his career in 1996 with the Winnipeg Blue Bombers.

Finally, Patton is in the CFL record books, tied with Earl Lunsford for having scored 5 rushing touchdowns in one game, against Winnipeg on August 5, 1995.

Patton died in a car accident on November 20, 2012, in Shelby County, Texas.He is survived by his 4 children.
