= Birmingham Barracudas =

Canadian Football League team

- Logo
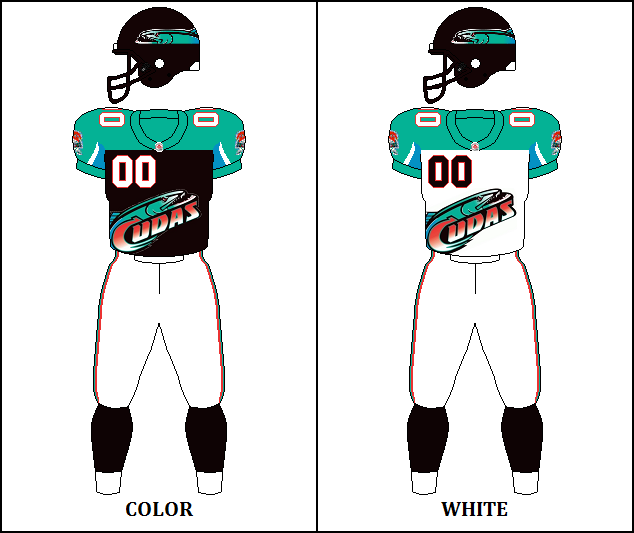
- Uniforms

General information
- Founded: 1995
- Folded: 1995
- Stadium: Legion Field
- Headquartered: Birmingham, Alabama, U.S.
- Colours: Black, teal, blue, burnt orange, and white

Personnel
- Owner: Art Williams
- Head coach: Jack Pardee

League / conference affiliations
- Canadian Football League; South Division

The Birmingham Barracudas were a Canadian football team that played the 1995 season in the Canadian Football League. The Barracudas were part of a failed attempt to expand the CFL into the United States.

== History ==
=== In the beginning ===
Insurance tycoon, former high school football coach and motivational speaker Art Williams was awarded a CFL expansion franchise in Birmingham. He wanted a nickname for the team that would "scare the spit out of people," and chose Barracudas.

The Barracudas hired head coach Jack Pardee, who had coached at the college level with the University of Houston and at the professional level with the WFL, USFL, and NFL. (Pardee is perhaps better known as one of the few six-man football players to have ever made it to the professional leagues; his knowledge of that wide-open game proved to serve him well in the similarly wide-open CFL.) The Barracudas were also led by veteran CFL quarterback Matt Dunigan, who had his best season while in Birmingham.

=== During the season ===
Birmingham competed in the Southern Division along with the San Antonio Texans, Baltimore Stallions, Memphis Mad Dogs, and Shreveport Pirates. After losing their two pre-season games, they played their first game July 4, 1995, versus the Winnipeg Blue Bombers in Winnipeg. They won 38–10, and would lose to the Tiger-Cats in Hamilton 31–13. They would get their revenge a week later at home by beating the Cats 51–28 in front of 31,000 fans.

The biggest home game of the season came against the Baltimore Stallions. It also proved to be the biggest disappointment, as the Barracudas lost 36–8.

Attendance at Legion Field was very good at first. The Birmingham crowds were some of the largest in the league. However, the CFL traditionally plays on Thursdays, Fridays and Saturdays, largely to avoid competing on television (both in its native country and the U.S.) with the National Football League. Unfortunately for the 'Cudas, those are the game nights that most high school and college teams play in the USA. Williams knew that Birmingham was a high school and college football hotbed. Well aware the CFL's scheduling model would cause serious attendance problems in the fall, Williams persuaded the league to let the 'Cudas play their September and October home games on Sundays so as not to compete directly against high school teams on Fridays and Alabama or Auburn on Saturdays. Because Alabamians in general are not loyal to any one NFL team, Williams reckoned that competing with that league on television was the more sensible risk to take. Despite this, attendance still fell through the floor as most Birmingham-area fans stayed home to watch the NFL on TV. Their last four home games did not attract more than 9,000 people, and looked even smaller than that since Legion Field seated over 83,000 people at the time. The Memphis Mad Dogs were plagued by similar attendance problems.

In the team's final home game, against the Edmonton Eskimos, Matt Dunigan left the game due to a shoulder injury, and Birmingham was forced to turn to back-up quarterback Jimmy Klingler. Despite the loss, the Barracudas still had a chance to claim home-field advantage in the playoffs. However, they lost a shootout of a season finale in San Antonio, finishing third in the Southern Division. They returned to San Antonio the following week for the Southern Division Semi-Final, but were whipped by the Texans 52–9, ending their first and only playoff run.

=== After the season ===
Owner Art Williams estimated that he had spent $10 million to launch the Barracudas, and had probably lost at least that, if not more, during the season. He also began criticizing the Canadian Football League, and its unique concept. Along with other U.S. owners, Williams wanted several changes made:

- Reducing the size of a CFL field to American football standards.
- Allowing only 11 players on each side of the ball, rather than 12.
- Changing the name of the league to show more of a U.S. presence.

The biggest change Williams wanted, however, was to move the season to the spring; he was not willing to risk another season of going head-to-head with college football. When the league refused to go along, Williams decided to get out. A day after losing in the South semifinals, he announced that the 'Cudas would not return to Birmingham in 1996, if they returned at all. In January 1996, he sold the team for $750,000—a significant loss, based on his own estimates—to a group of investors called Ark-La-Tex Football Association, who intended to move the team to Shreveport as a replacement for the Shreveport Pirates, who had collapsed under the mismanagement of infamous CFL owner Bernard Glieberman. The Pirates had been barely competitive on the field (winning only eight games in two years) and hamstrung by Glieberman off it, but nevertheless had managed to attract a fairly consistent and numerous fan base comparable with the established CFL teams that didn't disappear when college football season started. Although Shreveport was far smaller than Birmingham, it was thought that moving the 'Cudas there would match a team that had made a good showing in its first season with a market that was at least potentially capable of supporting it. The relocation, which hinged upon league approval, would have been part of a plan to keep at least three American teams in the CFL. The Grey Cup champion Baltimore Stallions were being forced out of town by the impending arrival of the Baltimore Ravens, would have moved to Houston. The 'Cudas, Stallions, and San Antonio Texans would have moved to a reconstituted East Division, concentrating the American teams in the Southwest.

By the end of January, it became clear that the league was no longer interested in playing in the United States. The league rejected the sale of the Barracudas and ordered them shut down. The Mad Dogs had already folded a month earlier. The Stallions ownership concurrently surrendered their franchise and reclaimed the inactive Montreal Alouettes franchise, which started play in 1996. Anderson was unwilling to continue without at least one other American team and folded the Texans, ending the CFL's American experiment. Williams would go on to purchase the Tampa Bay Lightning of the National Hockey League in 1998, and sell the club a year later.

== Seasons ==
Season	League	Finish	Wins	Losses	Ties	Playoffs
1995	CFL	3rd, South	10	8	0	Lost in Division Semi-Finals

== Players and builders of note ==
- Scott Player (played 10 years in the NFL and 1 year in the UFL)
- Shonte Peoples
- Reggie Slack
- Luis Zendejas

=== Canadian Football Hall of Famers ===
- Freddie Childress
- Eddie Davis
- Matt Dunigan

== See also ==
- CFL USA all-time records and statistics
- Comparison of Canadian and American football
- 1995 CFL season
