= Bernard Glieberman =

American businessman (1939–2024)

Bernard "Bernie" Glieberman (1939 – August 26, 2024) was an American real estate mogul and the president of Crosswinds Communities. Despite having made his fortune in real estate, Glieberman was perhaps best known for, with his son Lonie, making several unsuccessful and controversial forays into sports team ownership and management in the Canadian Football League.

Glieberman's father died when Glieberman was 17 years old, and after this the young Bernard took over control of his family real estate holdings. By the age of twenty-one he was a partner in a real estate firm, and at thirty-one he was able to buy out his partner's shares. By 1971, he had started the Crosswinds Communities corporation, which he ran and in which he was the sole shareholder.

== Football involvement ==
From 1991 to 2006, Glieberman was involved as the financier of several football operations in Canada and the United States. Glieberman put up the money while Lonie usually handled media relations and football operations.

=== The Rough Riders and Shreveport ===
In 1991, Glieberman and his son arrived in Ottawa to bail out the troubled Ottawa Rough Riders. The once-proud team had not had a winning season since 1979. The franchise was also in dire straits off the field as well as it was over C$1 million in debt. With his son as the franchise's frontman, Bernie bought the team for a dollar, assumed the debt, and provided the capital city's team with what must have seemed like stable ownership. Their first season, 1992, showed a good deal of promise; the Rough Riders finished 9-9, only their second non-losing season in 13 years.

It did not take long, though, for the Gliebermans to lose most of the goodwill they had built up. Before the 1993 CFL Season, the younger Glieberman fired general manager Dan Rambo, a move that he later called a serious blunder in hindsight. He then signed former National Football League Pro Bowl defensive lineman Dexter Manley, who had been banned from the NFL for life due to cocaine abuse. However, Manley had not played a meaningful down of football in almost a year, and it was soon apparent he was nowhere near his old Pro Bowl form. When Lonie demanded that the coaches not only keep Manley in the starting lineup, but also bring back a couple of players cut in training camp, assistant coaches Jim Daley and Mike Roach quit rather than comply. Meanwhile, Bernie made noises about moving the team to the United States, further driving down enthusiasm.

When it became apparent that the CFL would not even consider allowing one of the league's oldest franchises to move south of the border, Glieberman reached a deal with the league in which the Rough Riders franchise was split in half. The Canadian half was sold to Bruce Firestone for $1.85 million and retained the Rough Riders' name, colours and history. The American half became the Shreveport Pirates, part of the ill-fated CFL USA expansion scheme. The Pirates, like the whole expansion, were a failure, going 8-28 over two seasons. Glieberman initially attempted to stay in for the long haul, trying to move the team to Norfolk, Virginia. However, city officials were put out upon discovering that Glieberman had faced a number of lawsuits over his CFL career for not paying the bills, and that an antique automobile he owned had even been impounded due to his non-payment on a scoreboard for Independence Stadium.

=== All-American Football League ===
After the failure of his CFL experience, Glieberman tried again in football. In 1997, Glieberman proposed an All-American Football League with the objective of playing by March 1998. Glieberman planned to play a 20-game season in the spring and summer and make money by having the league sell television advertising rather than the network. The league would have been a single-owner entity, but the teams would have been operated locally. It also would have signed players before the draft in hopes of controlling costs.

=== Return to Ottawa ===
In May of 2005, Glieberman resurfaced in the CFL, purchasing the Ottawa Renegades after a season in which the league had financed the team. Lonie was once again installed as team president. The Renegades had struggled both financially and in the standings almost since their inception, and owner Bill Smith was sinking in red ink. He sold majority interest to Glieberman while remaining as a minority owner. The first move made by the Gliebermans was typically controversial: bringing 71-year-old Forrest Gregg as head of football operations after the latter had been out of professional football for ten years since his failed tenure as head coach of Glieberman's Shreveport Pirates. Lonie's Mardi Gras promotion of trying to lure women to Renegades games by offering them beads (a reward traditionally given in the celebration for the baring of breasts) was also criticized. Before the Renegades' final game of the 2005 season, Lonie announced the firing of popular head coach Joe Paopao and his staff, leaving them to coach the final game knowing that it would be their last. The Renegades missed the playoffs.

Claiming $4 million in losses, Glieberman sought a $2 million loan after Smith pulled out. The league, however, was not willing to agree to this, and put the Renegades up for sale on March 22. Unable to find a buyer, the league suspended the Renegades' operations on April 9.
