= Ron Meyer =

American football player and coach (1941–2017)

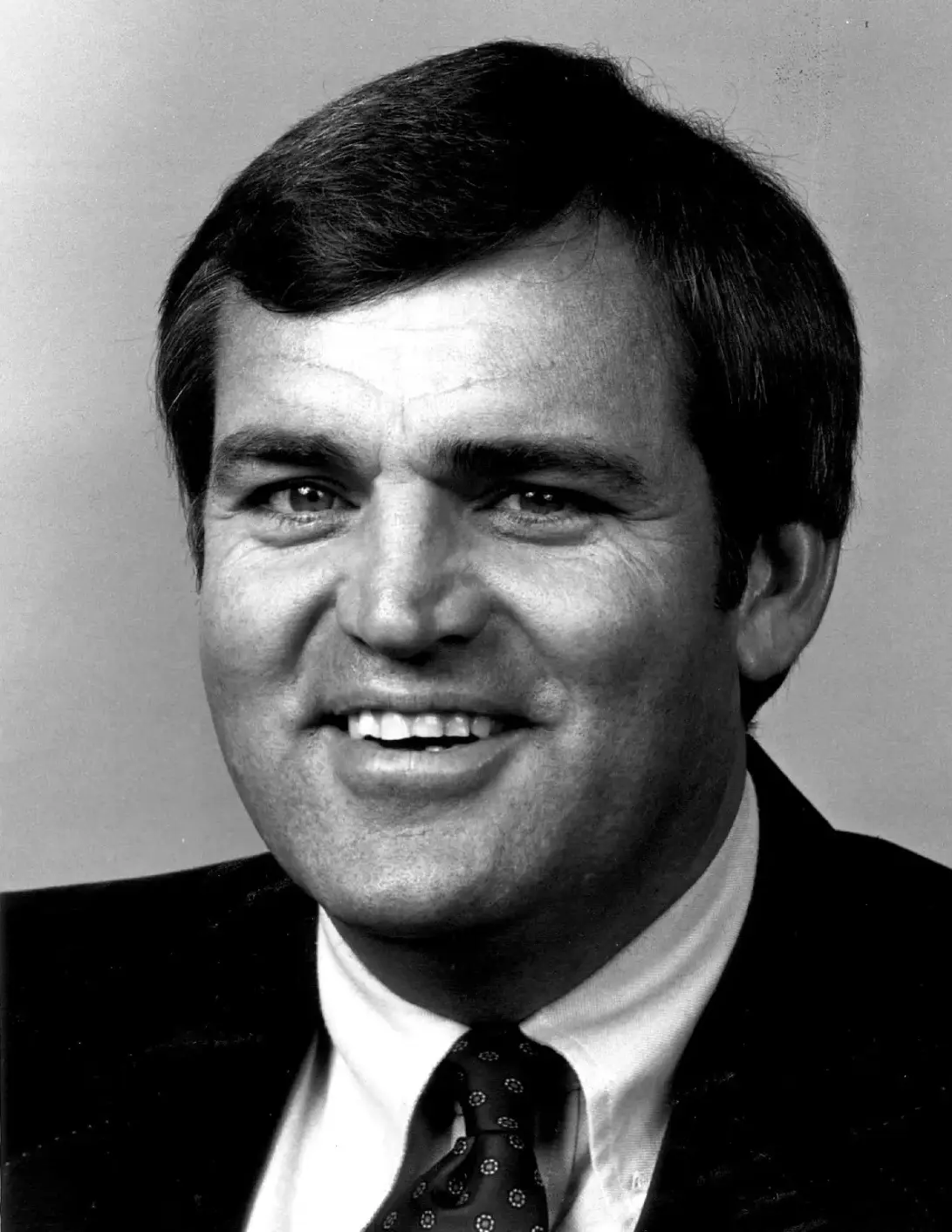
- Meyer c. 1982

Biographical details
- Born: February 17, 1941; Columbus, Ohio, U.S.
- Died: December 5, 2017 (aged 76); Lakeway, Texas, U.S.

Playing career
- 1961–1962: Purdue
- Positions: Quarterback, defensive back

Coaching career (HC unless noted)
- 1964: Penn HS (IN)
- 1965–1970: Purdue (assistant)
- 1971–1972: Dallas Cowboys (scout)
- 1973–1975: UNLV
- 1976–1981: SMU
- 1982–1984: New England Patriots
- 1986–1991: Indianapolis Colts
- 1994: Las Vegas Posse
- 2001: Chicago Enforcers

Head coaching record
- Overall: 61–40–1 (college); 54–50 (NFL); 5–13 (CFL); 5–6 (XFL)
- Bowls: 0–2

Accomplishments and honors

Championships
- SWC (1981)

Awards
- SWC Coach of the Year (1981)

Ronald Shaw Meyer (February 17, 1941 – December 5, 2017) was an American college and professional football coach. He served as the head football coach at the University of Nevada, Las Vegas (UNLV) from 1973 to 1975 and Southern Methodist University (SMU) from 1976 to 1981, and as a head coach in the National Football League (NFL), with the New England Patriots from 1982 to 1984 and the Indianapolis Colts from 1986 to 1991.

== Early life and education ==
Ron was born on February 17, 1941 in Westerville, Ohio to George Meyer and Mary Harsha. George was an alcoholic who was frequently absent from Ron's childhood, as Westerville was a dry town, forbidding the sale of alcohol. Mary took most of the burden of raising Ron alongside an older brother and two sisters. Mary later left George after all of her children had become independent.

At Westerville High School, Ron played football, basketball, and baseball, and he was class president each year. Shortly after graduation, Meyer married Carolyn, his high school's homecoming queen, who was pregnant and due in February of the following year.

Meyer sought to go to Ohio State due to their success in football in the 50s, though it became clear that Ohio State would not accept him. George Steinbrenner, a onetime graduate assistant on the Purdue Boilermakers football team, led Meyer to believe that he could arrange a scholarship for Meyer. When Meyer visited Purdue's football office, however, Steinbrenner was not present and nobody else knew of the supposed scholarship. Meyer and his mother persisted, and Coach Jack Mollenkopf eventually relented, letting Meyer onto the football team and giving him a scholarship.

== Career ==
Meyer served as head coach for Penn High School's football team for a year. From 1965 to 1970, he was an assistant coach on the Purdue football team, coaching future NFL quarterbacks Bob Griese and Mike Phipps. From 1971 to 1972, he worked as a scout alongside Bucko Kilroy for the Dallas Cowboys.

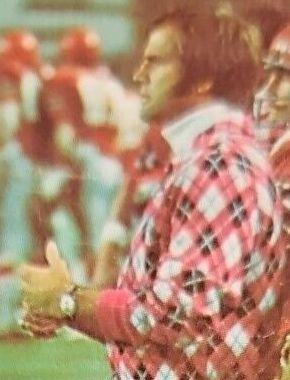
Meyer at UNLV c. 1975

Following a season of poor performance, the University of Nevada, Las Vegas (UNLV) Rebels hired Meyer in 1973, who successfully turned the program around. In the following three seasons, the Rebels went 27–8, with an undefeated regular season at 11–0 in 1974. In the wake of Meyer's later involvement in the SMU football scandal, former Rebels player Wayne Nunnely said of their sudden turnaround "I felt, uh, things moved awfully fast here, too. There were a lot of players in here really fast. That’s as far as I’ll go on that one."

=== Southern Methodist University ===
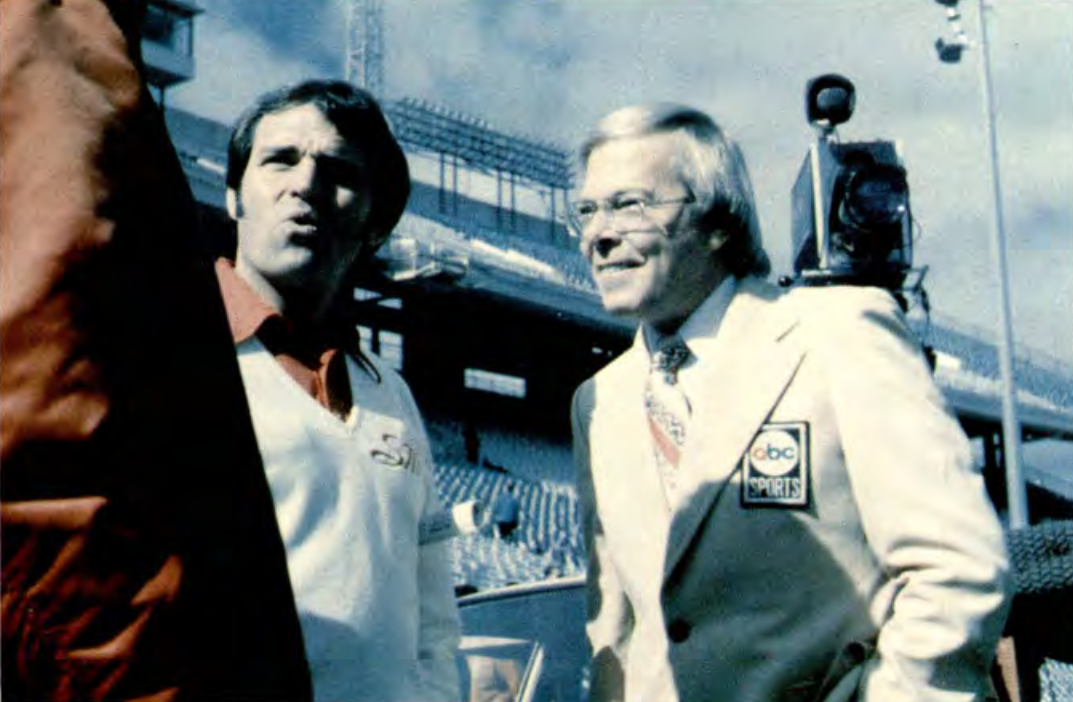
Meyer (left) with Verne Lundquist (right) c. 1977

In January 1976, Meyer was hired as the head coach at Southern Methodist University (SMU) in Dallas, where he led the Mustangs for six seasons. This tenure included winning the Southwest Conference championship in 1981 with running backs Eric Dickerson and Craig James. While at SMU, Meyer was the losing coach in the famous "Miracle Bowl" in the 1980 Holiday Bowl, where SMU held a 45–25 lead against BYU with less than four minutes to play in the fourth quarter, only to lose 46–45 thanks to three touchdown passes from Cougar quarterback Jim McMahon.

While at SMU, Meyer was noted for his unusual success in recruitment for a small private university; he was able to recruit top-rated high school recruits such as Eric Dickerson and Craig James. Unlike other Texas coaches at the time, Meyer recruited players regardless of race, creating a connection between SMU and inner-city and predominantly Black Texas schools. This decision was usually framed as charity or a social justice initiative, but internally, it was couched as an investment. Meyer was also implicated in the creation of a slush fund used to recruit new players through monthly payments or paying for moving expenses, ultimately resulting in the SMU football scandal.

=== New England Patriots ===
Meyer moved to the pros in 1982, where he coached the New England Patriots for three seasons. He was named the AFC Coach of the Year in his first season where he led the New England Patriots to the playoffs in the strike-shortened 1982 season after the team had finished with the league's worst record the prior season. During the Snowplow Game against the Miami Dolphins on December 12, 1982, under heavy snow at Foxboro Stadium with 4:45 remaining in the game, the Patriots lined up for a go-ahead field goal. Meyer called for a stadium worker named Mark Henderson (who was on a prison work release) to drive his snowplow on the field in order to clear an area for holder Matt Cavanaugh to spot the ball and to give kicker John Smith better footing. The Patriots went on to win the game, 3–0, on their way to their first playoff appearance since the 1978 season.

Meyer's coaching style caused friction between him and players. Meyer required offensive players to board a separate bus from defensive players, forbade loud music in the locker room, and players could not leave their hotel the night before a game. Unlike his predecessor Ron Erhardt, Meyer was far stricter on punctuality. Meyer and Stanley Morgan attributed the conflict to Meyer's retaining of a college football coaching style. In Meyer's first season, John Hannah requested to be traded and briefly retired, returning the next season. In retrospect, Don Hasselbeck said that the players were too hard on Meyer during his first season.

However, complaints about Meyer continued. By the 1984 season, the players despised Meyer, though Meyer was apparently unaware of this. Hannah, Smith and Patriots GM Patrick Sullivan all questioned Meyer's skill at football. Sullivan eventually held player-only meetings so that they could air their grievances about Meyer. In October 1984, Meyer responded by firing assistant coach Rod Rust, but Sullivan replaced Meyer with Raymond Berry (who rehired Rust) the next day, which was met with celebration among the players.

=== Indianapolis Colts ===
Meyer returned to Dallas, and, along with former assistant Steve Endicott, founded sports agency Athletic Associates. The agency loaned over a hundred thousand dollars to eight college football players, resulting in a 1991 lawsuit when the players failed to repay the loans.

After initially agreeing to accept the open head coach position at his collegiate alma mater, Purdue, Meyer left Athletic Associates and accepted the Indianapolis Colts head coach position, replacing Rod Dowhower. When he accepted the job late in the 1986 season, the Colts were 0–13 at the time. Meyer promptly led the Colts to 3 straight victories to finish 3–13. A year later, he won the AFC East title with the Colts. It was the franchise's first winning season and playoff appearance since 1977, when the team was still in Baltimore. Meyer once again won the AFC Coach of the Year. He was helped in large part by being reunited with his former college standout, Eric Dickerson, who was acquired by the Colts in a three-team, 10-player trade involving the Los Angeles Rams and Buffalo Bills.

Meyer's tenure crested at that point. He was unable to get another postseason berth in Indianapolis, slipping by one game in each of the next three seasons, from 9–7 in 1988, to 8–8 in 1989 and 7–9 in 1990, despite the selection of quarterback Jeff George with the first overall pick in the 1990 draft. He traded up in the draft to obtain George, which included sending star players, receiver Andre Rison, lineman Chris Hinton, and the Colts' first-round pick in 1991 to the Atlanta Falcons. In 1991, when the Colts started off 0–5, he was fired and replaced with Rick Venturi. GM Jim Irsay criticized Meyer for his draft picks and decision making.

=== Later career ===
Following his dismissal, Meyer became a pro football analyst for CNN.

In 1994, Meyer returned to coaching again. This time Meyer became the head coach of the Canadian Football League's Las Vegas Posse franchise. The heat was so extreme that Meyer allowed coaches to go shirtless and barefoot during practice. Poor attendance prompted the firing of the Posse's CEO Nick Mileti, after which Meyer quipped "This is the first time the owner was fired before I was." The Posse finished the season 5–13, and, despite attempts to move the team to San Antonio, Texas or Jackson, Mississippi, the team folded. Florida businessman Bruce Frey planned to buy the team and rebrand it to the Miami Manatees, retaining Meyer as coach, but Frey pulled out after an exhibition game demonstrated little local interest.

Meyer returned to his position at CNN, also appearing on the CNN/SI network. He was also an NFL analyst for the show The Score on the NFL on the Canadian sports channel The Score.

In 2001, Meyer was the coach of the XFL's Chicago Enforcers franchise, which he intended to use as a stepping stone to return to the NFL. The team would finish 5–5 and would lose to the eventual champion, the Los Angeles Xtreme, in the league semifinals. After the season, the XFL folded.

Meyer died on December 5, 2017, at age 76 from an aortic aneurysm while playing golf with friends in Lakeway, Texas.

== Head coaching record ==
=== College ===
Year	Team	Overall	Conference	Standing	Bowl/playoffs	Coaches^{#}	AP^{°}
UNLV Rebels (NCAA Division II independent) (1973–1975)
1973	UNLV	8–3					
1974	UNLV	12–1			L Grantland Rice		
1975	UNLV	7–4					
UNLV:		27–8					
SMU Mustangs (Southwest Conference) (1976–1981)
1976	SMU	3–8	2–6	T–7th			
1977	SMU	4–7	3–5	T–6th			
1978	SMU	4–6–1	3–5	T–6th			
1979	SMU	5–6	3–5	6th			
1980	SMU	8–4	5–3	T–2nd	L Holiday	20	20
1981	SMU	10–1	7–1	1st			5
SMU:		34–32–1	23-25				
Total:		61–40–1					
National championship Conference title Conference division title or championship game berth
^{#}Rankings from final Coaches Poll.; ^{°}Rankings from final AP Poll.

=== NFL ===
Team	Year	Regular season					Postseason			
Team	Year	Won	Lost	Ties	Win %	Finish	Won	Lost	Win %	Result
NE	1982	5	4	0	.556	7th in AFC	0	1	.000	Lost to Miami Dolphins in AFC Wild-Card Game
NE	1983	8	8	0	.500	2nd in AFC East	-	-	-	-
NE	1984	5	3	0	.625	2nd in AFC East	-	-	-	Fired midseason
NE total		18	15	0	.545		0	1	.000	
IND	1986	3	0	0	1.000	5th in AFC East	-	-	-	-
IND	1987	9	6	0	.600	1st in AFC East	0	1	.000	Lost to Cleveland Browns in AFC Divisional Game
IND	1988	9	7	0	.563	2nd in AFC East	-	-	-	-
IND	1989	8	8	0	.500	2nd in AFC East	-	-	-	-
IND	1990	7	9	0	.438	3rd in AFC East	-	-	-	-
IND	1991	0	5	0	.000	5th in AFC East	-	-	-	Fired midseason
IND total		36	35	0	.507		0	1	.000	
Total		54	50	0	.519		0	2	.000	

=== CFL ===
Team	Year	Regular season					Postseason			
Team	Year	Won	Lost	Ties	Win %	Finish	Won	Lost	Win %	Result
LV	1994	5	13	0	.278	6th in West Division	did not qualify			
Total		5	5	0	.500		0	0	.000	

=== XFL ===
Team	Year	Regular season					Postseason			
Team	Year	Won	Lost	Ties	Win %	Finish	Won	Lost	Win %	Result
CHI	2001	5	5	0	.500	2nd in Eastern Division	0	1	.000	Lost in Semifinals
Total		5	5	0	.500		0	1	.000	
