= Hornet Stadium (Sacramento) =

Stadium in California

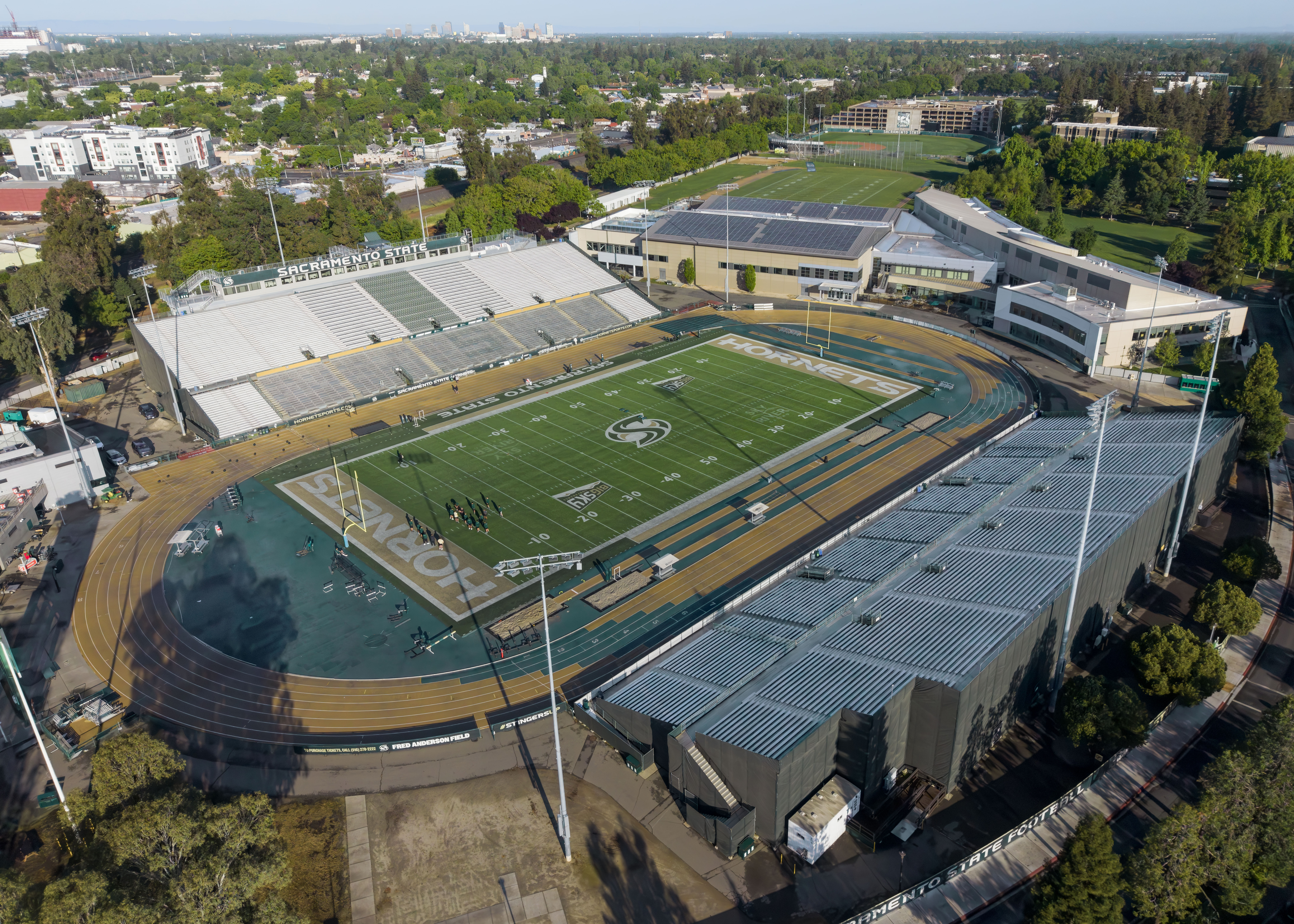
- View from southeast in 2017

- Location in the United States Location in California
- Interactive map of Hornet Stadium
- Address: 6000 J Street
- Location: Sacramento, California, U.S.
- Coordinates: 38.556°N 121.423°W
- Owner: California State University, Sacramento
- Operator: California State University, Sacramento
- Capacity: 21,195
- Surface: FieldTurf (2010–present); Natural grass (1969–2009)
- Record attendance: 23,073 (November 19, 2022 vs. UC Davis)
- Public transit: University / 65th St Station

Construction
- Opened: September 20, 1969; 57 years ago

Tenants
- Sacramento State Hornets (NCAA) (1969–present); Sacramento Surge (WLAF) (1992); Sacramento Gold Miners (CFL) (1993–1994); Sacramento Mountain Lions (UFL) (2010–2011)

Fred Anderson Field at Hornet Stadium is a 21,195-seat college football and track stadium on the campus of California State University, Sacramento. it is the home field of the Sacramento State Hornets of the Mid-American Conference. The field is named after local businessman and owner of the Sacramento Surge, Fred Anderson.

The stadium, which opened on September 20, 1969, has served as the home for several professional football teams throughout its history, including the Sacramento Surge of the WLAF, the Sacramento Gold Miners of the Canadian Football League and the Sacramento Mountain Lions of the United Football League. It hosted the U.S. Olympic Trials for track and field in 2000 and 2004.

Its alignment is nearly north-south, offset slightly northwest, and the street-level elevation is approximately 35 feet (11 m) above sea level. The field was natural grass for its first 41 seasons; FieldTurf was installed in 2010.

== Stadium improvements ==
=== 1992 ===
- Temporary seating was installed at the end zones to increase capacity to 26,000 for the Sacramento Surge. These seats were removed in 1993 to accommodate for the larger CFL field.

=== 1998 ===
- Permanent chairbacks were installed in Section 213 at the 50–yard line.

=== 2000 ===
- The stadium underwent a $1 million improvement in preparation for the U.S. Track and Field Olympic Trials; An Olympic–sized track was installed surrounding the field as well as a practice track north of the stadium.

=== 2003 ===
- New scoreboard installed.

=== 2007 ===
- New public entrances

=== 2008 ===
- Broad Fieldhouse opened, which included new offices, locker rooms, athletic training room, weight room and a VIP patio.

=== 2010 ===
- Natural grass was replaced by FieldTurf Duraspine Pro.
- "The Well" opened next to the north end zone which provided paved areas for concessions.
- A Jumbotron was added below the scoreboard for Sacramento Mountain Lions' games.

== Proposed replacement ==
On September 26, 2024, Sacramento State President Luke Wood, athletic director Mark Orr, and Hornets football head coach Andy Thompson announced plans for a new 25,000-seat stadium to be built on the site of the current Hornet Stadium, with construction to begin at the end of the 2024 season. The venue would be designed by Populous and include student seating, premium seating, and boxes. The effort to replace Hornet Stadium comes as part of a push to elevate Sacramento State to the FBS level and gain entry to the Pac-12 Conference or the Mountain West Conference; the Sacramento-Stockton-Modesto DMA is the 20th-largest media market in the nation and would be the second-largest in the Pac-12. Following the announcement, a group of local business and political leaders, named the SAC 12, announced that it had raised $35 million in NIL funds to support the effort; the group includes California State Senators Angelique Ashby and Melissa Hurtado, Assemblymembers Stephanie Nguyen and Joe Patterson, and Hornet football alum and former San Francisco 49er Otis Amey, among others.

== Notable events ==
- On July 17, 1993, it was the site of the first regular season Canadian Football League (CFL) game ever played on American soil, where the Calgary Stampeders defeated the Gold Miners 38–36.
- Fred Anderson Field hosted the first game between U.S. franchises in the CFL when the Las Vegas Posse defeated the Gold Miners 32–26.
- The largest crowd ever to witness an event at Fred Anderson Field was when the Sacramento Surge defeated the Barcelona Dragons in the World League playoffs on May 30, 1992 in front of 26,445 fans.
- The Sacramento Mountain Lions played their first game at the stadium on September 25, 2010 in a 24–20 win over the Florida Tuskers in front of a crowd that was estimated to be over 20,000.
- The stadium hosted the U.S. Olympic Trials for track and field in 2000 and 2004.
- In 2011, the stadium hosted the World Masters Athletics Championships.
- The stadium hosted the California Interscholastic Federation State Football Championships from 2015 to 2017.
- The 2014 USA Outdoor Track and Field Championships was held June 26–29 at Fred Anderson Field . Organized by USA Track and Field, the four-day competition took place in conjunction with the USA Junior Combined Events Outdoor Track & Field Championships which started the day before and served as the national championships in track and field for the United States.
- The largest Sacramento State football crowd occurred on November 19, 2022 when 23,073 fans saw the Hornets complete an 11–0 season with a 27–21 victory over UC Davis in the Causeway Classic.

== Gallery ==
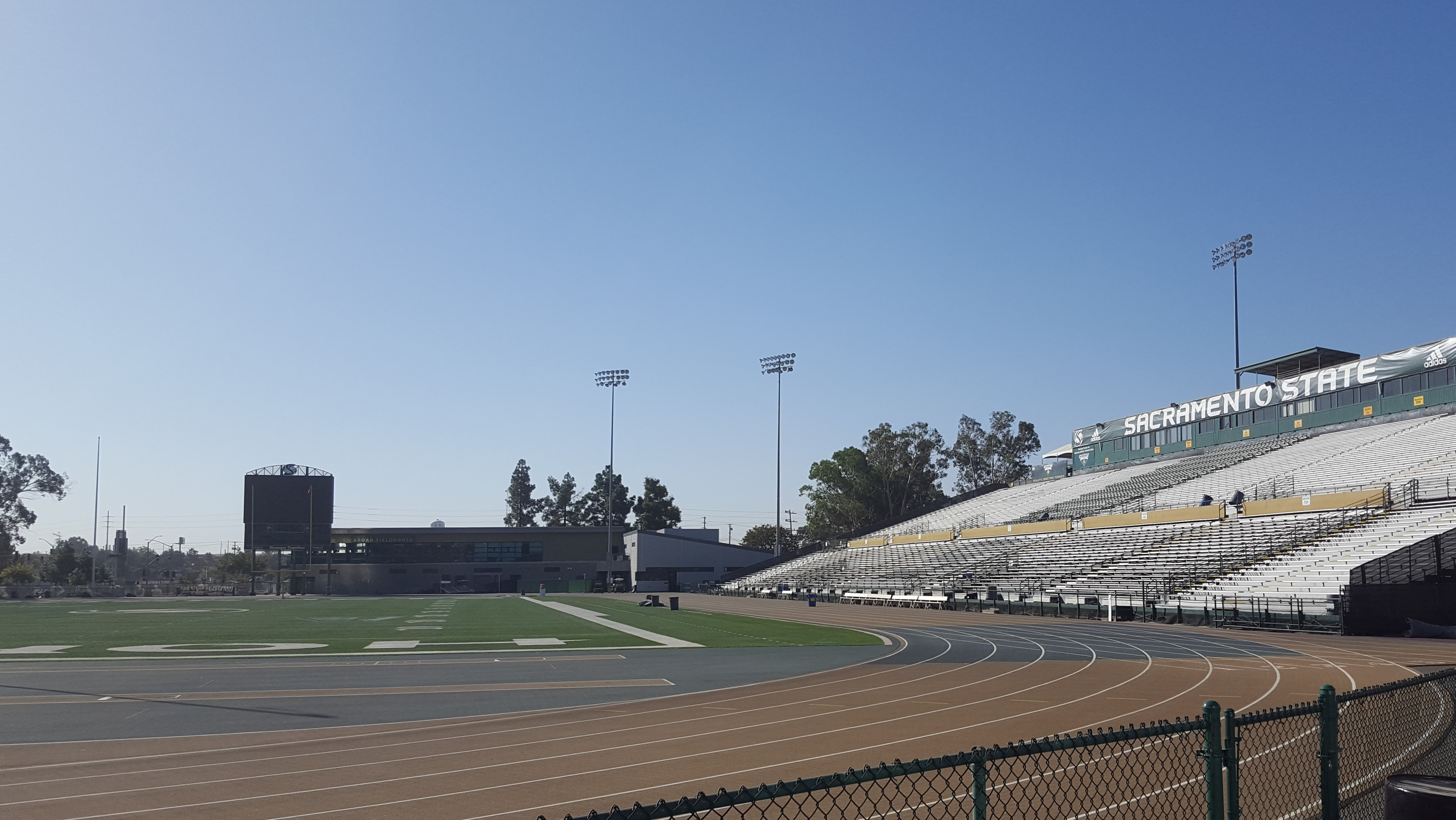
Fred Anderson Field – Home grandstand

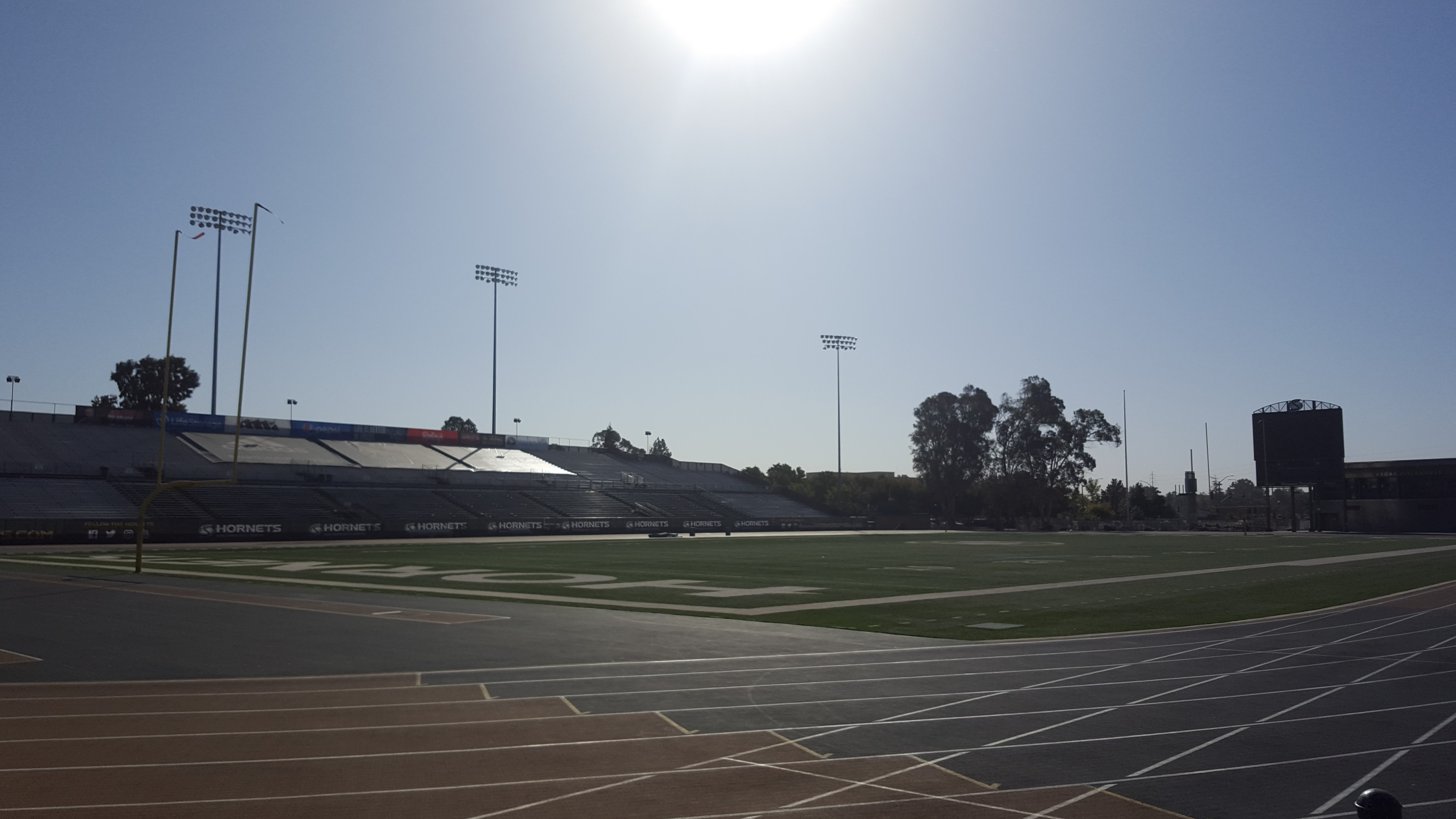
Fred Anderson Field – Away grandstand

== See also ==
- List of NCAA Division I FBS football stadiums
