= Junior Robinson (defensive back, born 1968) =

American gridiron football player (1968–1995)

No. 22, 27, 21, 2
- Position: Cornerback

Personal information
- Born: February 3, 1968; High Point, North Carolina, U.S.
- Died: September 30, 1995 (aged 27); Winston-Salem, North Carolina, U.S.
- Listed height: 5 ft 9 in (1.75 m)
- Listed weight: 181 lb (82 kg)

Career information
- High school: T. Wingate Andrews (High Point, North Carolina)
- College: East Carolina
- NFL draft: 1990: 5th round, 110th overall pick

Career history
- New England Patriots (1990); Sacramento Surge (1992); Detroit Lions (1992); Sacramento Gold Miners (1993–1994); Memphis Mad Dogs (1995)

Awards and highlights
- World Bowl champion (1992); Second-team All-American (1989); All-South Independent (1989)

Career NFL statistics
- Return yards: 211
- Stats at Pro Football Reference

David Lee Robinson Jr. (February 3, 1968 – September 30, 1995) was an American professional football defensive back who played in the National Football League (NFL), the World League of American Football (WLAF), and the Canadian Football League (CFL). He played for the New England Patriots and Detroit Lions of the NFL, the Sacramento Surge of the WLAF, and the Sacramento Gold Miners and Memphis Mad Dogs of the CFL. Robinson played collegiately at East Carolina University.

== Professional career ==
Robinson was selected by the New England Patriots in the fifth round (110th pick overall) of the 1990 NFL draft. He signed with the team on July 19, 1990. During his rookie season, he appeared in all 16 regular season games and returned 11 kickoffs for 211 yards, averaging 19.2 yards per return. The Patriots released him in final roster cuts on August 26, 1991.

== Death ==
Robinson died in a car accident on September 30, 1995.

== See also ==
- List of gridiron football players who died during their careers
