= Carl Parker =

American football player (born 1965)

No. 86
- Positions: Wide receiver, slotback

Personal information
- Born: February 5, 1965 (age 61); Columbus, Georgia, U.S.

Career information
- High school: Lowndes (Valdosta, Georgia)
- College: Vanderbilt
- NFL draft: 1988: 12th round, 307th overall pick

Career history
- Cincinnati Bengals (1988–1989); New York Jets (1990)*; Hamilton Tiger-Cats (1990); Pittsburgh Steelers (1991)*; Sacramento Surge (1991–1992); Minnesota Vikings (1992)*; Sacramento Gold Miners (1993); Albany Firebirds (1994)
- * Offseason or practice squad member only

Awards and highlights
- WLAF All-World Team (1991); WLAF World Bowl II; First-team All-SEC (1986); Second-team All-SEC (1987)

Career NFL statistics
- Receptions: 1
- Yards: 45
- Stats at Pro Football Reference

Career CFL statistics
- Receptions: 51
- Yards: 739
- Touchdowns: 6
- Stats at CFL.ca

Carl Wayne Parker (born February 5, 1965) is an American former professional football wide receiver in the National Football League (NFL), Canadian Football League (CFL), World League of American Football (WLAF), and Arena Football League (AFL) for the Cincinnati Bengals, Hamilton Tiger-Cats, Sacramento Surge, Sacramento Gold Miners, and the Albany Firebirds. He played college football for the Vanderbilt Commodores. Parker now coaches at Appling County High School in Baxley, Georgia.

== College career ==
Carl Parker played college football at Vanderbilt University. Where he totaled 118 catches and 1,712 yards, including 42 passes for a 19.2 YPC and 12 touchdowns as a Senior for the Commodores.

== Professional career ==
Parker was selected in the 12th round of the 1988 NFL draft with the 307th overall pick by the Cincinnati Bengals. Parker spent two seasons with Cincinnati with one reception for 45 yards.

From 1990 to 1992 Parker spent time in camp with the New York Jets, Pittsburgh Steelers, and the Minnesota Vikings.

== CFL, WLAF and AFL career ==
Parker signed with the Hamilton Tiger-Cats of the Canadian Football League in 1990. Playing in two games Parker caught 5 passes for 55 yards and 1 touchdown.

In 1991 the Sacramento Surge of the World League of American Football drafted him in the 4th round. Parker was Sacramento's leading receiver and Second in the League with 8 Touchdown receptions. Parker earned All-WLAF Second-team as the league's 3rd leading receiver in both receptions (52) and in yards receiving (801). Including three 100+ yard receiving games. Parker finished the 1992 Surge season with 42 receptions, for 657 yards, 6 touchdowns and the World Bowl '92 title over the Orlando Thunder.

Parker remained with Sacramento for the 1993 season in the Canadian Football League as the Gold Miners after the WLAF ceased operations. Finishing 1993 with 46 receptions, 684 yards and 5 touchdowns.

Parker spent his last season with the Albany Firebirds of the Arena Football League.
