= Todd Jones (disambiguation) =

Todd Jones (born 1968) is an American baseball pitcher.

Todd Jones may also refer to:

- B. Todd Jones (born 1957), American lawyer and ATF director
- Todd Jones (politician) (born 1967), American politician
- Todd Jones (American football) (born 1967), NFL player
- T-Nutty (Todd Jones Jr.), American rapper
- Todd Jones, frontman of the hardcore punk band Nails
