= List of VMI Keydets in the NFL draft =

This is a list of VMI Keydets football players who have been picked in the National Football League draft.

Each NFL franchise seeks to add new players through the annual NFL draft. The draft rules were last updated in 2009. The team with the worst record the previous year picks first, the next-worst team second, and so on. Teams that did not make the playoffs are ordered by their regular-season record with any remaining ties broken by strength of schedule. Playoff participants are sequenced after non-playoff teams, based on their round of elimination (wild card, division, conference, and Super Bowl).

Before the merger agreements in 1966, the American Football League (AFL) operated in direct competition with the NFL and held a separate draft. This led to a massive bidding war over top prospects between the two leagues. As part of the merger agreement on June 8, 1966, the two leagues would hold a multiple round "common draft". Once the AFL officially merged with the NFL in 1970, the common draft simply became the NFL draft.

The first VMI graduate picked in the draft was Joe Muha in 1943, the second overall pick. Nineteen Keydets have been selected all-time, the most recent of which was Mark Stock in 1989. No players were selected in the short-lived AFL.

== Key ==
B	Back	K	Kicker	NT	Nose tackle
C	Center	LB	Linebacker	FB	Fullback
DB	Defensive back	P	Punter	HB	Halfback
DE	Defensive end	QB	Quarterback	WR	Wide receiver
DT	Defensive tackle	RB	Running back	G	Guard
E	End	T	Offensive tackle	TE	Tight end

== Selections ==
Year	Round	Pick	Overall	Player	Team	Position
1937	6	4	54	Jim Farley	New York Giants	G
1940	10	2	82	Paul Shu	Pittsburgh Steelers	B
1943	1	2	2	Joe Muha	Philadelphia Eagles	B
1948	9	9	74	Malachi Mills	Chicago Bears	T
1949	1	7	7	Bobby Thomason	Los Angeles Rams	B
1953	30	4	353	Bill Brehany	Chicago Bears	QB
1954	27	11	324	Johnny Mapp	Cleveland Browns	B
1954	29	11	248	Troy Carter	Cleveland Browns	B
1958	11	9	130	Bobby Jordan	Baltimore Colts	B
1959	3	8	32	Pete Johnson	Chicago Bears	B
1959	4	6	42	Art Brandiff	Detroit Lions	B
1959	6	5	65	Jim McFalls	Washington Redskins	T
1960	2	9	21	Sam Horner	Washington Redskins	B
1961	6	7	77	Don Kern	Baltimore Colts	RB
1961	12	6	160	Howard Dyer	Chicago Bears	QB
1962	14	9	191	Stinson Jones	Baltimore Colts	B
1976	9	7	244	Ronnie Moore	New York Jets	WR
1980	10	8	257	Walt Bellamy	Atlanta Falcons	DB
1989	6	5	144	Mark Stock	Pittsburgh Steelers	WR
