= Robb White (American football) =

American football player (born 1965)

No. 71, 91, 92
- Position: Defensive end

Personal information
- Born: May 26, 1965 (age 61); Aberdeen, South Dakota, U.S.
- Listed height: 6 ft 4 in (1.93 m)
- Listed weight: 270 lb (122 kg)

Career information
- High school: Central (Aberdeen, South Dakota)
- College: South Dakota
- NFL draft: 1988: undrafted

Career history
- Washington Redskins (1988)*; New York Giants (1988–1989); Denver Broncos (1990)*; New York Giants (1990)*; Tampa Bay Buccaneers (1990); San Antonio Riders (1992); Sacramento Gold Miners (1993)
- * Offseason or practice squad member only

Career NFL statistics
- Sacks: 2.5
- Stats at Pro Football Reference

Robb Steven White (born May 26, 1965) is an American former professional football player who was a defensive lineman in the National Football League (NFL) and the World League of American Football (WLAF). He played for the New York Giants and Tampa Bay Buccaneers of the NFL, and the San Antonio Riders of the WLAF. White played collegiately at the University of South Dakota.
