= Todd Jones (American football) =

American football player (born 1967)

No. 63, 69
- Position: Offensive lineman

Personal information
- Born: July 3, 1967 (age 59); Hope, Arkansas, U.S.
- Listed height: 6 ft 3 in (1.91 m)
- Listed weight: 295 lb (134 kg)

Career information
- High school: Little Rock Central (Little Rock, Arkansas)
- College: Arkansas (1987–1988); Henderson State (1989–1990)
- NFL draft: 1991: 11th round, 280th overall pick

Career history
- Cleveland Browns (1991)*; Orlando Thunder (1992); Dallas Cowboys (1992); New England Patriots (1993); Denver Broncos (1994)*; Arizona Cardinals (1995)*; Memphis Mad Dogs (1995)
- * Offseason or practice squad member only

Awards and highlights
- Super Bowl champion (XXVII); NAIA first-team All-American (1990)

Career NFL statistics
- Games played: 4
- Stats at Pro Football Reference

Todd A. Jones (born July 3, 1967) is an American former professional football player who was an offensive tackle in the National Football League (NFL) for the Cleveland Browns, Dallas Cowboys, New England Patriots, and Denver Broncos. He also played in the World League of American Football (WLAF) with the Orlando Thunder and the Canadian Football League (CFL) with the Memphis Mad Dogs. He played college football for the Arkansas Razorbacks and Henderson State Reddies.

Jones was selected by the Browns in the eleventh round of the 1991 NFL draft, but never played in a regular season game for the team. He was also on the Dallas Cowboys' roster during their Super Bowl XXVII victory, though he was on the physically unable to perform list. He played in four regular season games during his career, all in 1993 with the Patriots.

== Early life ==
Jones was born July 3, 1967, in the city of Hope, Arkansas, located in the southwestern part of the state. By his teen years, he had moved to the state's capital of Little Rock.

Jones played high school football for the Little Rock Central Tigers, where he was a star his senior year. Beyond being named team captain and top offensive lineman at the school, he also earned all-conference, all-metro, all-state, and all-American honors en route to an 11–2 record that placed the Tigers in third place in the state of Arkansas.

== College career ==
=== Arkansas Razorbacks ===
Jones started playing college football in 1986 at the University of Arkansas in Fayetteville, but only saw action in the first three games before going down for the rest of the season with a knee injury.

During his sophomore season at Arkansas in 1987, Jones was a backup at tackle to Jim Mabry in the Razorbacks' wishbone formation. The following season in 1988, the two alternated as the starting tackle in an "option attack" offense.

=== Henderson State Reddies ===
After two seasons at Arkansas, Jones decided to transfer to Henderson State University in Arkadelphia in 1989. After sitting out the 1989 season, he played the 1990 season and made NAIA first-team All-American.

== Professional career ==
Jones did not attend the NFL Scouting Combine in Indianapolis, but was able to bench 225 pounds 44 times without stopping, which would have been the highest at the combine.

=== Cleveland Browns ===
On April 22, 1991, the Cleveland Browns selected Jones in the eleventh round of the 1991 NFL draft after having been described by the team's personnel department as "exceptionally strong, quick, and aggressive." However, the team cut him on August 8 of that year.

=== Orlando Thunder ===
In the spring of 1992, Jones joined the Orlando Thunder of the World League of American Football, a spring developmental league created by the NFL that later became known as NFL Europe. Jones played offensive guard in all ten of the team's games that season on an offensive line that allowed only ten sacks in the whole season.

The Thunder finished 8–2 and progressed to World Bowl '92, which they lost to the Sacramento Surge by a score of 21–17.

=== Dallas Cowboys ===
Following his performance in the WLAF, Jones signed a one-year deal with the Dallas Cowboys on June 10, 1992. Due to a left knee injury, he was put on the physically unable to perform list on July 17, 1992, where he remained for the entire 1992 season as the team went on to win Super Bowl XXVII.

Despite not having been available for the whole previous season, Jones was signed again by the Cowboys on May 27, 1993. He was waived by the team on August 30 of that year.

=== New England Patriots ===
On August 31, 1993, the day after being waived by the Cowboys, Jones was claimed by the New England Patriots. He played four games that season as a backup center before being released by the team on December 13, 1993.

=== Denver Broncos ===
The Denver Broncos signed Jones on August 9, 1994, but cut him only nine days later.

=== Memphis Mad Dogs ===
After four years of playing as a journeyman in the NFL, Jones signed with the Memphis Mad Dogs of the Canadian Football League. This was at the tail end of a failed experiment by the CFL to expand the league into the United States, and the Mad Dogs only existed for one season in 1995.

Jones played in 17 of the Mad Dogs' 18 games that season, primarily at left guard.

== Personal life ==
Jones married Valerie Sims in college, with whom he has a daughter named Gabriel (born 1989).
