= Dan Sileo =

American football player (born 1964)

No. 93, 71
- Position: Defensive tackle

Personal information
- Born: January 3, 1964 (age 62); Stamford, Connecticut, U.S.
- Listed height: 6 ft 1 in (1.85 m)
- Listed weight: 282 lb (128 kg)

Career information
- High school: Stamford (CT) Catholic
- College: Maryland / Miami (FL)
- Supplemental draft: 1987: 3rd round

Career history
- Tampa Bay Buccaneers (1987); Dallas Cowboys (1989)*; Orlando Thunder (1992); Detroit Lions (1992)*; Las Vegas Posse (1994); Las Vegas Sting (1994)
- * Offseason or practice squad member only

Awards and highlights
- ACC Football champions (1983); Division I-A national champion (1987); Second Team All-South (1986); NSCA All-American Strength Team (1986); HM AP All American Team (1986); Chevrolet Defensive Player of Game (1986); Outland & Rotary Lombardi Award Watch List (1987); HM PFWA NFL All-Rookie Team (1987); WLAF 2nd Team All-League (1992); CWA European Jr. Heavyweight Wrestling Title (1993); All-Arena League 2nd Team (1994); Emmy Award for Sunshine Network Live; Little Italy Hall of Fame (2015); WLAF Hall of Fame (2019)

Career AFL statistics
- Tackles: 12
- Fumble recoveries: 1
- Stats at ArenaFan.com
- Stats at Pro Football Reference

Daniel William Sileo (born January 3, 1964) is an American former football player and current sports radio host. He played college football at Maryland before transferring to Miami (FL). He was drafted in the third round of the 1987 NFL supplemental draft by the Tampa Bay Buccaneers. He was the host of The Dan Sileo Show in San Diego on KWFN 97.3 FM "The Fan" until April 2019. He had been hired in August 2019 by IHeartMedia to host afternoons on Fox Sports 910 KGME in Phoenix, Arizona, but the program was discontinued the following week due to pressure from the Arizona Coyotes hockey team. KGME has a broadcast agreement with the Coyotes and team management felt Sileo's past controversial remarks on sexuality and race were not a good fit with the team's flagship radio station.

During his career, Sileo also spent time with the Dallas Cowboys and Detroit Lions of the National Football League (NFL), as well as the Orlando Thunder of the World League of American Football (WLAF), the Las Vegas Sting of the Arena Football League (AFL), and the Las Vegas Posse of the Canadian Football League (CFL). In 1993 Sileo held the CWA (Catch Wrestling Association) Jr. Heavyweight European Championship. Sileo is of Italian-American descent.

== Early life ==
Sileo attended Stamford Catholic High School in Stamford, Connecticut. He received All-American honors as a senior by Adidas.

== College career ==
=== Maryland ===
Sileo originally enrolled at the University of Maryland, where as a freshman, in 1983, he played in 10 games and broke Hall of Famer (and former Terp) Randy White's freshman bench press record with a 405-pound bench press. Sileo was a backup on the University of Maryland's 1983 Atlantic Coast Conference Championship team.

=== Miami (FL) ===
In 1984, Sileo transferred to the University of Cincinnati, however, before playing for the Bearcats, he transferred again, this time to the University of Miami.

As a sophomore in 1985, Sileo recorded the nation's best bench press at 535 pounds.

As a junior in 1986, he helped form a stout defensive line that also included Jerome Brown, Danny Stubbs, and Bill Hawkins, which was voted by SB Nation as the greatest defensive line in program history also known as the famed "86 GANG". He led the Hurricanes' defensive line in solo tackles with 50 and 97 total and tackles-for-loss with 13 and third in sacks with six and first in fumbles with eight. In 1986, he was named to the National Strength Coaches Association All-American Strength Team, and was the strongest college football player in America. Sileo is considered the strongest player in program history with a 535-pound bench press and a 650-pound squat for an 1185-pound total,In 1986 made the AP All American team also was 2nd team All American with the FWAA.

As a senior in 1987, he was named to the Sporting News preseason All-American team, the Sporting News preseason Outland Trophy, and the Lombardi Trophy watch lists. He set the record for Miami Hurricane Football players with a 535-pound bench press and 700-pound squat.

In 2010, Sports Illustrated voted Sileo's 1986 Miami Hurricane Football team the most hated team in American sports history. In 2019: SB Nation named Sileo the greatest Miami Hurricane football player in program history from New England. In 2020: SB Nation named Sileo the 2nd Best Miami Hurricane transfer player in program history.

== Draft troubles ==
Sileo ran out of his five-year eligibility for NCAA play after the 1986 season. In September 1987, the NCAA ruled that he was ineligible to return and play for the Hurricanes. On September 6, 1987, two days after the NCAA deemed him ineligible, Sileo claimed that because he had not entered the 1986 NFL draft, he was a free agent; he proceeded to sign with the Buccaneers.

The NFL declared the contract invalid and put him in the 1987 NFL supplemental draft. Although Sileo initially sued the NFL and the Buccaneers to honor his original contract, he eventually submitted to the supplemental draft, where the Buccaneers selected him in the third round (56th overall). Sileo is the second-highest drafted defensive lineman in NFL supplemental draft history and the ninth-highest drafted Miami Hurricane defensive tackle since 1980.

== Professional career ==
In 1987, he played in 10 games as backup nose tackle and special teams player. On August 27, 1988, he was released, even though his selection cost the Buccaneers a 1988 third-round pick. In February 1989, he signed as a free agent with the Dallas Cowboys, reuniting him with Jimmy Johnson who was his head coach with the Hurricanes. He was released on August 28. Shortly after he was released, he fainted in his Dallas home and was rushed to the emergency room with a temperature of 106 degrees and an enlarged heart, where he was diagnosed meningococcal meningitis, which almost led to his death and would keep to him out of football for three years.

In 1992, he tried a comeback after being out of football for three years, signing with the Orlando Thunder of the World League of American Football. He received second-team All-League honors, while helping the team reach the World Bowl in Montreal, Quebec, where they lost to the Sacramento Surge 21-17.

On June 22, 1992, he was signed as a free agent by the Detroit Lions. He was released before the start of the season on August 24.

On May 2, 1994, he signed with the Las Vegas Posse of the Canadian Football League. He was waived on May 29.

In 1994, he signed with the Las Vegas Sting of the Arena Football League. He received honorable-mention All-League honors, while contributing to the team reaching the playoffs, where they lost to the Arizona Rattlers 51-46, to wrap up his professional football career. In 1999 Sileo was an extra in the Oliver Stone movie "Any Given Sunday".

== Professional wrestling career ==
Sileo had a brief career in professional wrestling. He was known as Bonecrusher Sileo, first hired by "Cowboy" Bob Orton in 1993 and was trained in Atlanta. He later went to the Catch Wrestling Association (CWA) in Vienna, Austria, where he wrestled for the Jr. Heavyweight Championship of Europe and held the title for 12 days before losing it to Rambo. Sileo was later hired by New Japan Pro-Wrestling in Tokyo and wrestled at the Tokyo Dome.

== Radio career ==
Sileo was hired by 810 KGO San Francisco, where he was a sports anchor on the morning show called Dunbar and Rosie and was hired by former general manager Mickey Luckoff. Sileo moved another local station, 680 KNBR, where he hosted Sportsphone 68 and co-owned KTCT "The Ticket" 1050 where he hosted the morning show with Rod Brooks called Ebony and Ivory. He was also on the Oakland Raiders pre-game and postgame shows and was the sideline reporter for Stanford Cardinal football and the San Jose SaberCats pre-and postgame host.

In 1998, Sileo moved to Tampa, to take over the morning show on 620 WDAE. Sileo raised the ratings for the show into the top 5.

In 2000, he moved to the nationally syndicated Fox Sports Radio Network. He hosted a 4am–8am program called The Dan Sileo Show. He was the first person hired by then CEO Kraig Kitchin and helped build a network of 233 stations. In September 2002, Sileo moved back to Florida and debuted on WYGM 740 "The Team" in Orlando. His program, The Dan Sileo Show, began airing from 6am to 9am, with an emphasis on hot topic issues such as race, drugs, and other sports scandals, as well as a typical morning wrap-up of the previous day's events. For a short time in 2004, the program was also heard on WINZ 940 AM in Miami. On weekends, he also worked as a sports analyst on Westwood One radio.

In December 2007, WYGM 740, owned by Clear Channel Communications, began changing its line-up of hosts. Sileo announced on-air that he had signed a new contract extension with Clear Channel to continue his show, but it would move down the dial to 540 WFLF. The show was also broadcast on co-owned WFXJ in Jacksonville. In March 2008, Sileo's radio show was cancelled by WFXJ. It returned to the station in January 2009.

Sileo's longest stint was on 620 WDAE in Tampa as the morning drive host. Former executives Gabe Hobbs and CEO Randy Michaels were major influences in Sileo's success and Michaels called Sileo "the best sports talk radio host in America." Sileo was syndicated in Orlando, back on 740 "The Game" (after that station changed back to a sports format). He was also a Heisman Trophy voter, a member of the Football Writers Association of America and a member of the Atlantic Coast Conference (ACC) media. In 2011 TV sports columnist Jim Williams of the Washington Examiner wrote that Sileo is "the best morning sports radio host in the country." In July 2012, Sileo was named to Talkers Magazine Top 100 SportsTalk Hosts in America at #32. He was also on the broadcast team for WFLA 970's broadcast of the Outback Bowl for four years.

Sileo was hired by San Diego's "The Mighty" 1090 AM XEPRS in February 2014 to do a morning show from 6am-9am Monday through Friday. Decades earlier, Robert Weston Smith also known as "Wolfman Jack," hosted the morning show on "the Mighty 1090" from the mid-1960s to the mid-1970s and was featured in the George Lucas movie American Graffiti. Due to XEPRS's powerful transmitter, it was also heard in Los Angeles.

In less than a year on The Mighty 1090's morning show, Sileo was named once again to the Talkers Magazine's Top 100 sports radio shows in America at number 93 in 2014 after tripling the ratings. In March 2015 and 2016, Sileo was named radio pregame host of the San Diego Padres. In October 2015, the Little Italy Association of San Diego honored him as one of America's most famous Italian Americans by adding him to the legendary "Banner Program". In 2015 Sileo was named number 29 by Talkers Magazine, among the most important SportsTalk Radio shows in America. He was also named #16 in Jason Barrett's Top 20 Morning Sports Radio Shows in America. He was named to RadioInk's Top 30 Local Sports Radio host in America at number 24. In 2016, the Football Writers Association of America (FWAA), invited him to vote weekly on the SUPER-16 Grantland Rice Poll which teams up weekly with the National Football Foundation (NFF). Again in 2016, he was named to the Radio Ink Top 30 SportsTalk radio shows in America, he came in at #21. He started out 2017 year being named #20 on Jason Barrett's Top 20 Morning Sports Radio Shows in America. He named to the 2017 Talker's Top 100 Sports Talk Radio shows in America in at #31. He was one of the few ex-pro athletes hosting a morning sports radio talk show as a solo host in America. In 2018, Sileo once again was named to Radio Ink's Top 30 SportsTalk radio host in America.

In January 2018, Sileo left "The Mighty 1090am" morning drive show for Entercom's new talk and sports station on 97.3 FM "The Machine" from 10am-2pm doing general talk radio. One month later, Entercom re-branded the station as "97.3 The Fan." Sileo returned to morning drive 5am-9am. In April 2019 Sileo left the morning show on 97.3 FM, but remained with Entercom Communications for several more months.

In August 2019, he was hired by IHeartMedia to host afternoons on Fox Sports 910 KGME in Phoenix. But the program was discontinued the following week due to pressure from the Arizona Coyotes hockey team. KGME carries the Coyotes and team management felt Sileo's past controversial remarks on sexuality and race were not a good fit with the team's flagship radio station.

In September 2020, Sileo started a new nationally syndicated radio show on the USA Radio Network. In April 2021, Sileo started on the "National Football Show" on YouTube/Jakib Media from 2-6 PM ET. His boss is Joe Krause. Sileo has been hired by Genesis Communications to host a mid-morining sports show from 10am-12 ET on WWBA-820 Monday thru Friday starting May 19,2025.In January of 2026 Sileo was hired by Sportsgrid to host a Monday thru Friday TV show from 12-1pm et.

=== Controversies ===
His career has been marked by a series of several controversial events that led to his firing from three radio stations in 2012 and 2013.

==== 2012 ====
Sileo was fired from WDAE in March 2012 after he called three black NFL free agents "monkeys." The Tampa Bay Times reported that, while discussing the possibility of Cortland Finnegan, Vincent Jackson, and Jonathan Vilma joining the Tampa Bay Buccaneers, Sileo said, "If they get those three monkeys, I'm good. I'm ready, man. I'm ready. I want those guys. Those guys are great players."

==== 2013 ====
Sileo had joined 560 WQAM in Miami in April 2012 but was fired in March 2013 after several public missteps. In January 2013, he was suspended from the station after a series of sexist tweets directed at Fox Sports broadcaster Erin Andrews. The Tampa Tribune reported that one of the comments referred to a 2008 incident in which a stalker secretly recorded a video of Andrews in her hotel room. Sileo tweeted to Andrews: "pepe [sic] hole best thing for ur career." He also referred to her as a "bimbo", told her to "make me dinner" and "bake me a cake" and added, "love Erin either naked or in a porn..not at a sports desk."

In November 2013, Sileo was fired by WMEN after sending a tweet that he was placing a $1,000 bounty on Florida State defensive lineman Timmy Jernigan. Sileo said that he would pay $1,000 to any Miami Hurricanes player that "TAKES THIS KID OUT" while attaching a photo of Jernigan using his hands to create "The U".

== Personal life ==
Sileo is a relative of former New York Mets manager Bobby Valentine and New York Giants defensive end Andy Robustelli.

== See also ==
- List of gridiron football players who became professional wrestlers
