= Bob Owens (American football, born 1946) =

American football coach (born 1946)

Biographical details
- Born: c. 1946 (age 79–80)
- Education: University of La Verne

Coaching career (HC unless noted)
- 1980: Oregon (assistant)
- ?: Utah State (assistant)
- ?: Fresno (assistant)
- 1992: Sacramento Surge (RB/WR)
- 1993: Chico State (assistant)
- 1995: Nevada (WR)
- 1996–2002: Whittier
- 2003–2005: Humboldt State (OC)
- 2006–2024: Chapman

Head coaching record
- Overall: 126–106
- Tournaments: 1–4 (NCAA D-III playoffs)

Accomplishments and honors

Championships
- 6 SCIAC (1997–1998, 2014, 2017, 2019, 2023); 2 SCIAC Surf Division (2023, 2024)

Awards
- 4× SCIAC Coach of the Year (1997, 2014, 2017, 2023)

Bob Owens (born c. 1946) is an American former football coach. He was the head football coach for Chapman University, a position he held from 2006 until his retirement in 2024. Owens served as head football coach at Whittier College in Whittier, California from 1996 to 2002. He was an assistant coach for the Sacramento Surge of the World League of American Football (WLAF) in 1992 when the team won World Bowl '92.

== Head coaching record ==
Year	Team	Overall	Conference	Standing	Bowl/playoffs
Whittier Poets (Southern California Intercollegiate Athletic Conference) (1996–2002)
1996	Whittier	1–8	1–4	T–5th	
1997	Whittier	5–4	4–1	T–1st	
1998	Whittier	7–2	5–0	1st	
1999	Whittier	0–9	0–5	6th	
2000	Whittier	4–5	4–1	2nd	
2001	Whittier	2–7	2–3	T–4th	
2002	Whittier	1–8	1–4	T–4th	
Whittier:		20–43	17–18		
Chapman Panthers (NCAA Division III independent) (2006–2010)
2006	Chapman	4–5			
2007	Chapman	6–3			
2008	Chapman	5–4			
2009	Chapman	4–5			
2010	Chapman	4–5			
Chapman Panthers (Southern California Intercollegiate Athletic Conference) (2011–2024)
2011	Chapman	4–5	N/A	N/A	
2012	Chapman	6–3	5–2	3rd	
2013	Chapman	8–1	6–1	2nd	
2014	Chapman	8–2	7–0	1st	L NCAA Division III First Round
2015	Chapman	4–5	4–3	T–3rd	
2016	Chapman	5–4	4–3	T–4th	
2017	Chapman	6–3	6–0	1st	L NCAA Division III First Round
2018	Chapman	5–4	4–3	4th	
2019	Chapman	10–1	7–0	1st	L NCAA Division III Second Round
2020–21	No team—COVID-19				
2021	Chapman	7–3	4–2	T–2nd	
2022	Chapman	7–3	4–2	T–3rd	
2023	Chapman	6–4	6–2	T–1st (Surf)	L NCAA Division III First Round
2024	Chapman	7–3	6–2	1st (Surf)	
Chapman:		106–63	63–20		
Total:		126–106			
National championship Conference title Conference division title or championship game berth
