= Rich Stephens =

American football player (1965–2025)

No. 62, 77
- Position: Offensive lineman

Personal information
- Born: November 1, 1965; St. Louis, Missouri, U.S.
- Died: June 22, 2025 (aged 59); Cedar Hill, Missouri, U.S.
- Listed height: 6 ft 7 in (2.01 m)
- Listed weight: 310 lb (141 kg)

Career information
- High school: Northwest (Cedar Hill)
- College: Tulsa
- NFL draft: 1989: 9th round, 250th overall pick

Career history
- Cincinnati Bengals (1989)*; Washington Redskins (1989)*; New York Jets (1989)*; Sacramento Surge (1991); Los Angeles Raiders (1991)*; Sacramento Surge (1992); Los Angeles/Oakland Raiders (1992–1996)
- * Offseason or practice squad member only

Awards and highlights
- World Bowl champion (1992)
- Stats at Pro Football Reference

Richard Scott Stephens (November 1, 1965 – June 22, 2025) was an American professional football offensive lineman who played for the Los Angeles/Oakland Raiders of the National Football League (NFL). He played college football for the Tulsa Golden Hurricane.

== Early life ==
Richard Scott Stephens was born on November 1, 1965, in St. Louis, Missouri. He attended Northwest High School in Cedar Hill, Missouri.

== College career ==
Stephens enrolled at the University of Tulsa to play college football. He was a member of the Tulsa Golden Hurricane from 1985 to 1988.

== Professional career ==
Stephens was selected by the Cincinnati Bengals in the ninth round, with the 250th overall pick, of the 1989 NFL draft. He signed with the team on July 19. He was released on August 29 after the third game of the 1989 preseason.

Stephens was signed to the practice squad of the Washington Redskins on September 27, 1989. He was released on October 17, 1989.

The New York Jets signed Stephens to their practice squad on October 23, 1989. He was released on October 31, 1989.

Stephens started all ten games for the Sacramento Surge of the World League of American Football (WLAF) during the 1991 WLAF season. The Surge finished the year with a 3–7 record.

Stephens signed with the Los Angeles Raiders on May 29, 1991. He was later released on August 26 after the final game of the 1991 preseason.

Stephens played in all ten games for the Surge for the second straight year in 1992. They went 8–2 in the regular season and later won World Bowl '92.

Stephns was signed by the Raiders again on June 9, 1992. He was released on August 31 and signed to the practice squad on September 2. He was promoted to the active roster on October 24 but did not play in any games during the 1992 NFL season. Stephens played in all 16 games, starting one, as a offensive tackle and guard in 1993. He also appeared in two playoff games in a reserve role. He was on the Raiders active roster for the third straight season in 1994 but did not play in any games. Stephens played in 13 games, starting one, for the newly-renamed Oakland Raiders in 1995. He had surgery on August 18, 1996, to repair a broken bone below his knee. He was placed on injured reserve.

== Personal life ==
Stephns died on June 22, 2025, in Cedar Hill, Missouri.
