= Lance Zeno =

American football player (born 1967)

No. 60, 61
- Position: Center

Personal information
- Born: April 15, 1967 (age 59); Los Angeles, California, U.S.
- Listed height: 6 ft 4 in (1.93 m)
- Listed weight: 300 lb (136 kg)

Career information
- High school: Fountain Valley (CA)
- College: UCLA
- NFL draft: 1991: undrafted

Career history
- Dallas Cowboys (1991)*; Sacramento Surge (1992); Cleveland Browns (1992–1993); Tampa Bay Buccaneers (1993); Green Bay Packers (1993); Atlanta Falcons (1994)*; Green Bay Packers (1994)*; St. Louis Rams (1995–1996)*; Scottish Claymores (1996)
- * Offseason or practice squad member only

Awards and highlights
- 2× World Bowl champion (IV, II); All-World League (1996)

Career NFL statistics
- Games played: 10
- Stats at Pro Football Reference

Lance Michael Zeno (born April 15, 1967) is a former center in the National Football League (NFL).

== Career ==
Pre-draft measurables
Height	Weight	Arm length	Hand span	Bench press
6 ft 3 3/4 in (1.92 m)	272 lb (123 kg)	30 1/2 in (0.77 m)	9 7/8 in (0.25 m)	30 reps
All values from NFL Combine

Zeno spent the 1992 NFL season in the Cleveland Browns. He would split the 1993 NFL season with the Browns and the Green Bay Packers.

He played at the collegiate level at the University of California, Los Angeles.

Zeno is currently the offensive line coach for Mater Dei High School, CA.
