= Mickey Guidry =

American football player (born 1966)

No. 8, 5
- Position: Quarterback

Personal information
- Born: August 9, 1966 (age 60); New Orleans, Louisiana, U.S.
- Listed height: 6 ft 2 in (1.88 m)
- Listed weight: 205 lb (93 kg)

Career information
- High school: Archbishop Shaw (Marrero, Louisiana)
- College: LSU (1985–1988)
- NFL draft: 1989: undrafted

Career history
- London Monarchs (1991); San Antonio Riders (1991); Sacramento Surge (1991); New Orleans Night (1991); Sacramento Surge (1992); New Orleans Night (1992)

Career AFL statistics
- Comp. / Att.: 246 / 450
- Passing yards: 2,626
- TD–INT: 30–29
- QB rating: 61.77
- Rushing TDs: 3
- Stats at ArenaFan.com

Mickey J. Guidry (born August 9, 1966) is an American former professional football quarterback who played two seasons with the New Orleans Night of the Arena Football League (AFL). He played college football at Louisiana State University.

== Early life and college ==
Mickey J. Guidry was born on August 9, 1966, in New Orleans, Louisiana. He attended Archbishop Shaw High School in Marrero, Louisiana.

Guidry was a four-year letterman for the LSU Tigers of Louisiana State University from 1985 to 1988. He was the backup to Tommy Hodson during his college career. Guidry completed three of five passes for 60 yards in 1985, 31 of 46 passes (67.4%) for 355 yards, two touchdowns, and four interceptions in 1986, 23 of 43 passes (53.5%) for 315 yards, two touchdowns, and one interception in 1987, 28 of 43 passes (65.1%) for 365 yards and one touchdown in 1988. He scored one rushing touchdown in college. In the 1989 Hall of Fame Bowl, Guidry suffered a shoulder injury requiring surgery and months of rehabilitation. He graduated from LSU with a general business degree in spring 1989.

== Professional career ==
Guidry went undrafted in the 1989 NFL draft. He returned to LSU to work on his master's degree. He was also a color commentator for TigerVision during the 1990 season. Guidry decided to try out for the World League of American Football (WLAF) after receiving a call from a friend who worked at the WLAF's office in Dallas.

Guidry signed with the London Monarchs of the WLAF in 1991. He was the third-string quarterback with the Monarchs and was traded to the San Antonio Riders before playing in any games. Guidry was the third stringer with the Riders as well. He played in one game for San Antonio but did not record any statistics. Due to a WLAF ruling requiring all teams to have three quarterbacks, a quarterback allocation draft was held. Guidry was drafted by the Sacramento Surge and was their third stringer but did not appear in any games.

Guidry played in eight games for the New Orleans Night of the Arena Football League (AFL) in 1991, completing 86 of 150 passes (57.3%) for 1,072 yards, 15 touchdowns, and nine interceptions while also rushing for three touchdowns.

Guidry was a member of the Sacramento Surge of the WLAF during the 1992 WLAF season but once again did not play in any games.

Guidry appeared in eight games again in 1992, completing 160 of 300 passes (53.3%) for 1,554 yards, 15 touchdowns, and 20 interceptions.

== Personal life ==
In 1991, Guidry released an autobiography titled "Through the Eyes of Number Two". In 1993, he started a career in the investment industry. He later became a Chartered Financial Analyst.
