= Kay Stephenson =

American gridiron football player and coach (born 1944)

No. 18, 10
- Position: Quarterback

Personal information
- Born: December 17, 1944 (age 81); DeFuniak Springs, Florida, U.S.
- Listed height: 6 ft 1 in (1.85 m)
- Listed weight: 210 lb (95 kg)

Career information
- High school: Pensacola (Pensacola, Florida)
- College: Florida (1966)
- NFL draft: 1967: undrafted

Career history

Playing
- San Diego Chargers (1967); Buffalo Bills (1968); Jacksonville Sharks (1974)

Coaching
- Rice (1971-1972) Assistant coach; Baker County (HS) (1973) Head coach; Jacksonville Sharks (1974) Offensive assistant coach; Los Angeles Rams (1977) Quarterbacks coach; Buffalo Bills (1978–1982) Quarterbacks coach; Buffalo Bills (1983–1985) Head coach; Sacramento Surge (1991-1992) Head coach; Sacramento Gold Miners (1993–1994) Head coach; San Antonio Texans (1995) Head coach; Arkansas (1997) Offensive coordinator / running backs coach; Edmonton Eskimos (1998) Head coach

Operations
- Buffalo Bills (1983) Player personnel

Awards and highlights
- World Bowl champion (II)

Career AFL statistics
- Passing attempts: 105
- Passing completions: 40
- Completion percentage: 38.1%
- TD–INT: 6–9
- Passing yards: 481
- Passer rating: 36.2
- Stats at Pro Football Reference

Head coaching record
- Regular season: NFL: 10–26 (.278); CFL: 36–35–1 (.507); WLAF: 11–9 (.550)
- Postseason: CFL: 2–2 (.500); WLAF: 2–0 (1.000)
- Career: NFL: 10–26 (.278); CFL: 38–37–1 (.507); WLAF: 13–9 (.591)
- Coaching profile at Pro Football Reference

George Kay Stephenson (born December 17, 1944) is an American former professional football player and coach, whose latter career has seen him work in four different leagues. Stephenson played quarterback for the American Football League's San Diego Chargers and Buffalo Bills. He finished his playing career in 1974 in the World Football League with the Jacksonville Sharks before entering the coaching ranks.

== Early life ==
Stephenson was born in DeFuniak Springs, Florida, in 1944, and grew up in nearby Pensacola. He attended Pensacola High School, and he earned All-State accolades as a quarterback. He accepted an athletic scholarship to attend the University of Florida, where he played college football for coach Ray Graves' Florida Gators teams from 1964 to 1966. His arrival on the Florida campus coincided with that of another standout recruit, Steve Spurrier, who became the starting quarterback in 1964, and who won the Heisman Trophy in 1966. Stephenson remained a backup.

Stephenson graduated from Florida with a bachelor's degree in physical education in 1967.

== Professional football coaching career ==
After serving as a quarterbacks coach the previous season, Stephenson succeeded Chuck Knox as Buffalo Bills head coach on February 3, 1983. Stephenson was reportedly surprised to get the job, claiming that Bills owner Ralph Wilson "never explained his reasons for selecting me." Under Stephenson, the Bills went 8–8 in 1983, 2–14 in 1984, and after they lost their first four games in 1985, Stephenson was replaced by Hank Bullough. Perhaps the most lasting impression that Stephenson left on the Bills was changing their helmet color from white to red prior to the 1984 season, insisting that the change would aid Buffalo quarterbacks in finding receivers downfield. At the time, three of the Bills' four division rivals, the New England Patriots, Indianapolis Colts, and Miami Dolphins, wore white helmets. The gambit didn't work as interceptions actually increased the subsequent season.

Stephenson also coached in the World League where he led the Sacramento Surge to the 1992 World Bowl championship, and in the Canadian Football League he coached the Sacramento Gold Miners, San Antonio Texans and the Edmonton Eskimos.

=== Head coaching record ===
==== NFL ====
Team	Year	Regular season					Postseason			
Team	Year	Won	Lost	Ties	Win %	Finish	Won	Lost	Win %	Result
BUF	1983	8	8	0	.500	3rd in AFC East	–	–	–	–
BUF	1984	2	14	0	.125	5th in AFC East	–	–	–	–
BUF	1985	0	4	0	.000	5th in AFC East	–	–	–	–
BUF total		10	26	0	.278		–	–	–	
NFL total		10	26	0	.278		–	–	–	

==== WLAF ====
Team	Year	Regular season					Postseason			
Team	Year	Won	Lost	Ties	Win %	Finish	Won	Lost	Win %	Result
SAC	1991	3	7	0	.300	3rd in NA West	–	–	–	–
SAC	1992	8	2	0	.800	1st in NA West	2	0	1.000	World Bowl II champions
SAC total		11	9	0	.579		2	0	1.000	
WLAF total		11	9	0	.579		2	0	1.000	

==== CFL ====
Team	Year	Regular season					Postseason			
Team	Year	Won	Lost	Ties	Win %	Finish	Won	Lost	Win %	Result
SAC	1993	6	12	0	.333	5th in CFL West	–	–	–	–
SAC	1994	9	8	1	.528	5th in CFL West	–	–	–	–
SAC total		15	20	1	.431		–	–	–	
SAT	1995	12	6	0	.667	2nd in CFL South	1	1	.500	Lost to Baltimore Stallions in Division Finals
SAT total		12	6	0	.667		1	1	.500	
EDM	1998	9	9	0	.500	2nd in CFL West	1	1	.500	Lost to Calgary Stampeders in Division Finals
EDM total		9	9	0	.500		1	1	.500	
CFL total		36	35	1	.507		2	2	.500	

== See also ==
- List of American Football League players
- List of Buffalo Bills head coaches
- List of Buffalo Bills players
- List of University of Florida alumni
