= Tom Huiskens =

No. 89
- Position: Tight end

Personal information
- Listed height: 6 ft 2 in (1.88 m)
- Listed weight: 207 lb (94 kg)

Career information
- High school: Bay City (MI) Central
- College: University of Michigan (1968-1970)

Awards and highlights
- Male High School Athlete of the Year (Michigan, 1967-68); Bay County Sports Hall of Fame (2010)

Thomas A. Huiskens (born c. 1950) is an American former football player and executive. He played college football for the University of Michigan and later served as the general manager of the Sacramento Gold Miners in the Canadian Football League.

== Early life ==
Huiskens was born in approximately 1950 and attended Bay City Central High School in Bay City, Michigan. At Bay City Central, he played tight end and linebacker and served as team captain of an undefeated football team that finished the 1967 season with a 9–0 record. In naming Huiskens as a first-team all-state player, the Associated Press in December 1967 wrote that Huiskens "may be the best college football prospect in Michigan." He was also a unanimous selection as the Most Valuable Player in the Saginaw Valley Conference, and a Parade All-American. He also played baseball at Bay City Central, hit over .400 as a senior, and was named Male High School Athlete of the Year for the state of Michigan for the 1967–68 academic year.

== University of Michigan ==
Huiskens enrolled at the University of Michigan in 1968 and played college football as a tight end for head coach Bo Schembechler's Michigan Wolverines football teams in 1969 and 1970. He sustained a knee injury in 1970 that ended his playing career.

== Later years and honors ==
After leaving Michigan, Huiskens went into the building industry, moved to Florida and then to northern California. In the early 1990s, he was offered a position of Director of Operations for the Sacramento Surge in the World League of American Football. From 1993 to 1994, he was the general manager of the Sacramento Gold Miners, the first American team in the Canadian Football League. He later worked as the director of sales operations for the Senior PGA TOUR and a producer for in-stadium experience for Vince McMahon in the XFL.

Huiskens was inducted into the Bay County Sports Hall of Fame in 2010.
