= Louis Riddick =

American football player and broadcaster (born 1969)

No. 26, 42, 29, 41, 33
- Position: Safety

Personal information
- Born: March 15, 1969 (age 57); Quakertown, Pennsylvania, U.S.
- Listed height: 6 ft 2 in (1.88 m)
- Listed weight: 215 lb (98 kg)

Career information
- High school: Pennridge (Perkasie, Pennsylvania)
- College: Pittsburgh
- NFL draft: 1991: 9th round, 248th overall pick

Career history

Playing
- San Francisco 49ers (1991)*; Sacramento Surge (1992); Atlanta Falcons (1992); Cleveland Browns (1993–1995); Atlanta Falcons (1996); Oakland Raiders (1998); Seattle Seahawks (1999)*; Orlando Rage (2001)
- * Offseason or practice squad member only

Operations
- Washington Redskins (2001–2004) Pro scout; Washington Redskins (2005–2007) Director of pro personnel; Philadelphia Eagles (2008) Pro scout; Philadelphia Eagles (2009) Assistant director of pro personnel; Philadelphia Eagles (2010–2013) Director of pro personnel

Awards and highlights
- World Bowl champion (1992); First-team All-East (1989); Second-team All-East (1990)

Career NFL statistics
- Tackles: 155
- Sacks: 2.0
- Safeties: 1
- Stats at Pro Football Reference

Louis Angelo Riddick (born March 15, 1969) is an American football broadcaster and former safety who played in the National Football League (NFL) from 1991 to 1998. He is a commentator for ESPN and ABC on both their college football and NFL broadcasts.

== Playing career ==
Riddick played college football for the Pittsburgh Panthers, playing running back and defensive back. At Pitt, Riddick was a four-year letterman, two-time Academic All-American and team captain his senior season; and graduated with a degree in economics.

He was drafted by the San Francisco 49ers in the ninth round of the 1991 NFL draft. He also played for the Atlanta Falcons, Cleveland Browns and Oakland Raiders in the NFL, as well as the Sacramento Surge (WLAF) and the Orlando Rage (XFL).

Pre-draft measurables
Height	Weight	Arm length	Hand span	40-yard dash	10-yard split	20-yard split	20-yard shuttle	Vertical jump	Broad jump	Bench press
6 ft 1 7/8 in (1.88 m)	216 lb (98 kg)	32 in (0.81 m)	9 5/8 in (0.24 m)	4.72 s	1.68 s	2.76 s	4.09 s	32.5 in (0.83 m)	10 ft 4 in (3.15 m)	17 reps
All values from NFL Combine

== Post-playing career ==
After his playing career ended, Riddick became a pro scout for the Washington Redskins for four years before being promoted to Director of Pro Personnel. He was hired by the Philadelphia Eagles as a pro scout in 2008. He was promoted to Director of Pro Personnel on February 3, 2010.

Riddick originally joined ESPN in May 2013 as an NFL Front Office Insider. Riddick later became an ESPN analyst. In 2020, he became an announcer for ESPN's coverage of Monday Night Football. In addition to his role on MNF, Riddick also contributes to ESPN’s signature NFL shows: Sunday NFL Countdown, Monday Night Countdown and NFL Live, as well as SportsCenter, Get Up and ESPN Radio.

Riddick has been interviewed for various general manager vacancies, including (2020) for the Houston Texans and Detroit Lions, (2022) for the Pittsburgh Steelers, and (2024) for the New York Jets.

== Personal life ==
Louis Riddick's brother, Robb Riddick, was a running back with the Buffalo Bills for eight seasons. His cousins, Will Lewis and Tim Lewis, also played in the NFL and held management positions for professional football teams.

In 2022, Riddick received an honorary Doctor of Arts and Letters degree for distinguished service in the field of sports analysis and broadcasting from his alma mater the University of Pittsburgh.
