= George Bethune (gridiron football) =

American gridiron football player (born 1967)

No. 57, 93, 55
- Positions: Defensive end, linebacker

Personal information
- Born: March 30, 1967 (age 59); Fort Walton Beach, Florida, U.S.
- Listed height: 6 ft 4 in (1.93 m)
- Listed weight: 238 lb (108 kg)

Career information
- High school: Fort Walton (FL) Choctawhatchee
- College: Alabama
- NFL draft: 1989: 7th round, 188th overall pick

Career history
- Los Angeles Rams (1989–1990); Sacramento Surge (1992); Houston Oilers (1992) *; Green Bay Packers (1993) *; Winnipeg Blue Bombers (1993); Sacramento Gold Miners (1994); San Antonio Texans (1995)

Awards and highlights
- World Bowl champion (1992)

Career NFL statistics
- Sacks: 4
- Fumble recoveries: 1
- Stats at Pro Football Reference

George Edward Bethune (born March 30, 1967) is an American former professional football player who was a defensive end and linebacker in the National Football League (NFL), the World League of American Football (WLAF), and the Canadian Football League (CFL). He played for the Los Angeles Rams of the NFL, the Sacramento Surge of the WLAF, and the Sacramento Gold Miners and San Antonio Texans of the CFL. He played collegiately at the University of Alabama, where he became a member of Phi Beta Sigma fraternity in 1987.

== Professional career ==
=== Los Angeles Rams ===
Bethune was selected by the Los Angeles Rams in the seventh round (188th overall) of the 1989 NFL draft. In two season with the Rams, he played in 32 games and had two sacks in each season. He wore jersey number 57.

Bethune was released on August 19, 1991.

=== Sacramento Surge ===
Bethune was selected by the Sacramento Surge in the first round (first overall) of the 1992 World League of American Football Draft.

=== Houston Oilers ===
Bethune was signed by the Houston Oilers on July 7, 1992. He was released on August 31.

=== Green Bay Packers ===
Bethune was signed by the Green Bay Packers on February 24, 1993.

=== Sacramento Gold Miners ===
Bethune was acquired by the Sacramento Gold Miners from the Winnipeg Blue Bombers in a trade for defensive end Emanuel King on May 24, 1994.
