= John Vitale (American football) =

American football player (1965–2000)

No. 67 (Michigan)
- Positions: Center, Offensive guard

Personal information
- Born: December 28, 1965; Detroit, Michigan, U.S.
- Died: July 9, 2000 (aged 34); Grosse Pointe, Michigan, U.S.
- Listed height: 6 ft 1 in (1.85 m)
- Listed weight: 273 lb (124 kg)

Career information
- High school: De La Salle Collegiate (Warren, Michigan)
- College: Michigan

Career history
- Michigan Wolverines (1985–1988); San Antonio Riders (1991); Detroit Drive (1993–1994)

Awards and highlights
- Consensus All-American (1988); 2× First-team All-Big Ten (1987, 1988)
- Stats at ArenaFan.com

John Vitale (December 28, 1965 – July 9, 2000) was an American football player. He played college football as a center and offensive guard for the University of Michigan from 1985 to 1988. He was selected as a consensus All-American center in 1988. He later played professional football for the San Antonio Riders of the World League of American Football (WLAF) in 1991 and the Detroit Drive of the Arena Football League (AFL) from 1993 to 1994.

== Early life ==
A Detroit native, Vitale was born in 1965 and attended De La Salle Collegiate High School in Warren, Michigan.

== University of Michigan ==
Vitale enrolled at the University of Michigan in 1984 and played college football for head coach Bo Schembechler's Michigan Wolverines football teams from 1985 to 1988. After redshirting in 1984, Vitale started nine games at left offensive guard for the 1985 Michigan Wolverines football team that compiled a 10-1-1 record, defeated Nebraska in the 1986 Fiesta Bowl, and finished the season ranked #2 in the AP Poll.

As a sophomore, Vitale was converted to the center position and started all 13 games at that position for the 1986 Michigan team that compiled an 11-2 record and was ranked #8 in the final AP Poll. As a junior, he again started every game at center for the 1987 Michigan team and was selected as a first-team All-Big Ten Conference player. In his senior year, he started every game for Michigan, completing a streak of 37 consecutive games as Michigan's starting center. He also served as a co-captain of the 1988 Michigan team that compiled a 9-2-1 record, defeated USC 22-14 in the 1989 Rose Bowl, and was ranked #4 in the final AP Poll. At the end of the 1988 season, Vitale was selected as the consensus first-team center on the 1988 College Football All-America Team.

Vitale was also known as a team leader who once showed up with a U-M winged football helmet design shaved into the side of his head. Vitale had a close relationship with his head coach, Bo Schembechler. Sportswriter Mitch Albom wrote about the following exchange between Vitale and Bo Schembechler. "You gonna work us today, Chief?" Vitale would ask. 'I'm gonna kick your butt," Schembechler would say. "Good," Vitale would answer.

== Professional football ==
Vitale was not selected in the 1989 NFL draft but attended training camp with the Houston Oilers. A recurring back injury prevented him from playing successfully in the National Football League (NFL). He did play for the San Antonio Riders of the World League of American Football in 1991 and the Detroit Drive of the Arena Football League from 1993 to 1994.

== Later life ==
After his playing career ended, Vitale worked for Wolverine Human Services. His final position was as the director of a community center on the east side of Detroit that was later renamed the John S. Vitale Community Center in his honor.

Vitale was diagnosed with ependymoma, cancer of the spinal cord, in 1994 at age 29. He married Lynn Abdelnour in 1998. In 1999, he found the cancer had returned and he started aggressive chemotherapy treatments. When his father told him that the cancer had spread to his brain, Vitale said, "Well, this sucks." According to sports columnist Mitch Albom, "those were the only negative words anyone heard him say." He died at age 34 in Grosse Pointe, Michigan.
