= Gary Richard =

American football player (born 1965)

No. 44, 46
- Position: Cornerback

Personal information
- Born: October 9, 1965 (age 61); Denver, Colorado, U.S.
- Listed height: 5 ft 9 in (1.75 m)
- Listed weight: 171 lb (78 kg)

Career information
- High school: Denver East
- College: Pittsburgh
- NFL draft: 1988: 7th round, 173rd overall pick

Career history
- Green Bay Packers (1988); Pittsburgh Steelers (1989)*; Detroit Lions (1990)*; San Antonio Riders (1991-1992)
- * Offseason or practice squad member only

Awards and highlights
- All-World League (1991); First-team All-East (1987); Second-team All-East (1986)

Career NFL statistics
- Games played: 10
- Stats at Pro Football Reference

Gary Ross Richard (born October 9, 1965) is an American former professional football player who was a defensive back in the National Football League (NFL). He played college football for the Pittsburgh Panthers.

== Biography ==
Richard was born Gary Ross Richard on October 9, 1965, in Denver, Colorado.

== Career ==
Richard was selected in the seventh round of the 1988 NFL draft by the Green Bay Packers and spent that season with the team. He played at the collegiate level at the University of Pittsburgh.
