= Donnie Gardner =

American football player (born 1968)

No. 79, 96
- Position: Defensive end

Personal information
- Born: February 17, 1968 (age 58); Louisville, Kentucky, U.S.
- Listed height: 6 ft 3 in (1.91 m)
- Listed weight: 260 lb (118 kg)

Career information
- High school: Trinity (Louisville)
- College: Kentucky
- NFL draft: 1990: 7th round, 171st overall pick

Career history
- Tampa Bay Buccaneers (1990)*; Detroit Lions (1990)*; San Antonio Riders (1991); Miami Dolphins (1991); New York Jets (1992)*; Philadelphia Eagles (1993)*
- * Offseason or practice squad member only

Awards and highlights
- All-World League (1991)

Career NFL statistics
- Sacks: 1
- Stats at Pro Football Reference

Redondo Lee "Donnie" Gardner (born February 17, 1968) is an American former professional football player who was a defensive end in the National Football League (NFL). He played college football for the Kentucky Wildcats and was selected by the Tampa Bay Buccaneers in the seventh round of the 1990 NFL draft.

Gardner was also a member of the Detroit Lions, San Antonio Riders, Miami Dolphins, New York Jets and Philadelphia Eagles.

== Early life ==
Gardner played high school football at Trinity High School in Louisville, Kentucky.

== College career ==
Gardner played college football at the University of Kentucky for four seasons before being dismissed from the team his senior year (1989). He had been the only true freshman to letter his first year, and in his final season he was second on the team in sacks with four and eighth on the team with 49 tackles.

== Personal ==
Gardner is the brother of former NFL fullback Carwell Gardner.
