= John Peterson (American football) =

American football coach and executive

United States Football League (2022)
- Title: Director of player personnel

Personal information
- Born: September 26, 1948 (age 78); Ann Arbor, Michigan, U.S.

Career information
- College: Eastern Michigan B.S. (1970); Michigan State M.A. (1971); Utah Ph.D. (1976)

Career history

Coaching
- Highland HS (IN) (1971–1972) Assistant; Northern Illinois (1973–1974) Graduate assistant; Westminster (UT) (1975–1976) Assistant head coach/defensive coordinator; Frostburg State (1977–1981) Head coach; Holy Cross (1981–1982) Assistant head coach/recruiting coordinator; Bemidji State (1982–1989) Head coach

Operations
- Ottawa Rough Riders (CFL) (1989–1990) Director of player personnel; San Antonio Riders (WLAF) (1991–1992) Vice president/general manager; Toronto Argonauts (CFL) (1994–1996) Director of player personnel; Seattle Seahawks (NFL) (1997–2008) Area college scout; Carolina Panthers (NFL) (2008–2016) Area college scout; BC Lions (CFL) (2016–2017) Player personnel evaluator; San Antonio Commanders (AAF) (2019) Director of football operations; New York Guardians (XFL) (2020) Director of football operations; The Spring League (TSL) (2021 Senior advisor for football operations; United States Football League (2022) (USFL) (2022 – present) Director of player personnel

Awards and highlights
- C.O. Brocato NFL Scout of the Year Award (2010); Ourlads Scouting Hall of Fame

Head coaching record
- Career: 44–65–3 (.406)

John E. Peterson (born September 25, 1948) is an American football executive and former coach. He was the sixth head football coach at Frostburg State University in Frostburg, Maryland, serving for four seasons, from 1977 to 1981, and compiling a record of 14–25. Peterson later served as head coach at Bemidji State University in Bemidji, Minnesota for seven seasons, from 1982 to 1989, compiling a record of 30–40–3.

After 18 years in college football, Peterson has spent 39 years in scouting and personnel in professional football: in the Canadian Football League (CFL), World League of American Football (WLAF), National Football League (NFL), the Alliance of American Football (AAF), the XFL (2020), The Spring League (TSL), and is now working as the Director of Player Personnel for the United States Football League (2022) (USFL).

== Head coaching record ==
Year	Team	Overall	Conference	Standing	Bowl/playoffs
Frostburg State Bobcats (NAIA Independent) (1977)
1977	Frostburg State	1–9			
Frostburg State Bobcats (NCAA Division III Independent) (1978–1980)
1978	Frostburg State	3–7			
1979	Frostburg State	6–4			
1980	Frostburg State	4–5			
Frostburg State:		14–25			
Bemidji State Beavers (Northern Intercollegiate Conference) (1982–1989)
1982	Bemidji State	2–8	2–4	T–4th	
1983	Bemidji State	4–6–1	1–4–1	7th	
1984	Bemidji State	8–3	4–2	T–3rd	
1985	Bemidji State	7–3	3–3	T–3rd	
1986	Bemidji State	6–4–1	3–2–1	3rd	
1987	Bemidji State	2–7–1	0–5–1	6th	
1988	Bemidji State	1–9	0–6	7th	
Bemidji State:		30–40–3	13–26–3		
Total:		44–65–3			
