= Chris Ford (American football) =

American football player (born 1967)

No. 81, 83
- Position: Wide receiver

Personal information
- Born: May 20, 1967 (age 59); Houston, Texas, U.S.
- Listed height: 6 ft 1 in (1.85 m)
- Listed weight: 185 lb (84 kg)

Career information
- High school: St. Thomas (Houston)
- College: Lamar (1986–1989)
- NFL draft: 1990: undrafted

Career history
- Tampa Bay Buccaneers (1990); San Francisco 49ers (1992)*; Orlando Thunder (1992); Orlando Predators (1993–1995); Milwaukee Mustangs (1996); Texas Terror (1996–1997); Houston Thunderbears (1998)
- * Offseason or practice squad member only
- Stats at Pro Football Reference
- Stats at ArenaFan.com

Christopher David Ford (born May 20, 1967) is an American former professional football player who was a wide receiver for one season with the Tampa Bay Buccaneers of the National Football League (NFL). He played college football at Lamar. He was also a member of the San Francisco 49ers of the NFL, the Orlando Thunder of the World League of American Football (WLAF), and the Orlando Predators, Milwaukee Mustangs, and Texas Terror/Houston Thunderbears of the Arena Football League (AFL).

== Early life and college ==
Christopher David Ford was born on May 20, 1967, in Houston, Texas. He attended St. Thomas High School in Houston.

He was a member of the Lamar Cardinals football team from 1986 to 1989 and a three-year letterman from 1987 to 1989.

== Professional career ==
=== Tampa Bay Buccaneers ===
After going undrafted in the 1990 NFL draft, Ford signed with the Tampa Bay Buccaneers on April 6, 1990. He was waived on September 2 but later signed to the team's practice squad on October 1. He was promoted to the active roster on October 19 but released on October 26 and re-signed to the practice squad on October 30 without appearing in a game. Ford was promoted to the active roster again on November 2 and played in one game for the Buccaneers during the 1990 season without recording any statistics.

Ford became a free agent in February 1991 and re-signed with the Buccaneers. He was waived on August 26, 1991.

=== San Francisco 49ers ===
Ford was signed by the San Francisco 49ers in 1992 but released on July 31, 1992. He also played for the Orlando Thunder of the World League of American Football (WLAF) during the 1992 WLAF season, catching five passes for 30 yards.

=== Orlando Predators ===
Ford played in five games for the Orlando Predators of the Arena Football League (AFL) in 1993, catching eight passes for 111 yards and one touchdown on offense while recording three solo tackles, four assisted tackles, two pass breakups, and two blocked kicks on defense. He was a wide receiver/linebacker during his time in the AFL as the league played under ironman rules. He appeared in 11 games for the Predators in 1994, totaling 22 receptions for 303 yards and four touchdowns, 12 carries for 43 and three touchdowns, seven solo tackles, four assisted tackles, and one pass breakup. Ford appeared in nine games during his final season for the Predators in 1995, recording 12 receptions for 134 yards, 15 kick returns for 230 yards, three solo tackles, one pass breakup, and one fumble recovery.

=== Milwaukee Mustangs ===
Ford played nine games for the Milwaukee Mustangs of the AFL during the 1996 season, catching 24 passes for 248 yards and two touchdowns, returning 12 kicks for 175 and one touchdown, and making four solo tackles.

=== Texas Terror/Houston Thunderbears ===
Ford also played in five games for the AFL's Texas Terror in 1996, accumulating 14 receptions for 141 yards and two touchdowns, 15 solo tackles, and one interception. He appeared in eight games for the Terror in 1997, catching a career-high 46 passes for 687 yards and 13 touchdowns while totaling eight solo tackles, four assisted tackles, one sack, three pass breakups, and one interception on defense. The Terror became the Houston Thunderbears in 1998. Ford played in 11 games for the Thunderbears during his final AFL season in 1998, totaling 31 catches for 330 yards and nine touchdowns, 11 solo tackles, four assisted tackles, one sack, one interception, and two pass breakups.
