= David Archer =

David Archer may refer to:

- David Archer (quarterback) (born 1962), American football player
- David Archer (American football coach) (born 1982), American football coach and former player
- David Archer (scientist) (born 1960), computational ocean chemist
- David Archer (field hockey) (1928–1992), British Olympic hockey player
- David Archer (umpire) (1931–1992), West Indian cricketer and umpire
- Dave Archer (painter) (born 1941), reverse glass painter and sculptor
- David Archer (The Archers), a character in the BBC Radio soap opera The Archers
- David Archer (politician) British Virgin Islander politician
