= Jarrod Johnson =

American football player (born 1969)

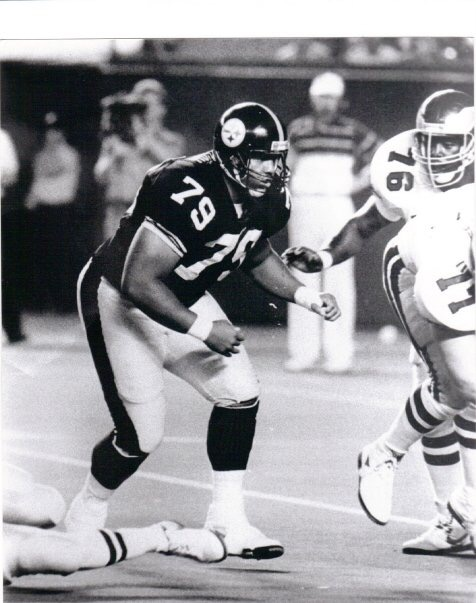

Jarrod Godette Johnson (born March 29, 1969), is a former professional American football player who played in the National Football League for the Pittsburgh Steelers and San Diego Chargers, as well as for the Sacramento Surge of the World League of American Football, with whom he won the World Bowl in 1992.

The son of Goine and Betty Johnson, he was raised in East Orange, New Jersey. Despite weighing only 143 pounds, his football coaches at Seton Hall Preparatory School in West Orange, New Jersey had him play center. While Johnson had always wanted to play linebacker, the 100 pounds that he added to his frame while in high school helped him grow into the position. He was on the basketball team at Seton Hall Prep, playing power forward position by his senior year.

Johnson attended Lehigh University, earning the starting role as center during his junior year on the Lehigh Mountain Hawks football team, where he was named to the all Patriot League team twice, and graduated with a degree in economics. Though bypassed in the 1991 NFL draft, he signed as a free agent with the Pittsburgh Steelers, a team that he had rooted for in his youth.

Johnson played 13 games with the Sacramento Surge in 1992, as part of the team that won that year's World Bowl. Johnson went into training camp with the San Diego Chargers in 1992, but ended up requiring surgery on his knee.

After playing professional football, he went on to earn a master's degree in Business Administration and is now a board certified Healthcare Executive. In his spare time, Johnson is a college football official at the FCS Division I level. He worked the 2019 FCS Division 1 National Championship Game at the Line Judge position. In that game, North Dakota State University defeated Eastern Washington University 38–24.

Prior to his high school football career, Johnson competed in various karate tournaments. In 1981, he won the AAU New Jersey state championship, as well as the AAU national championship that same year at 12–13 year old division. He was named an AAU All-American that year. In 1982, he won the AAU New Jersey state championship in the 13 year old division and did not compete in the national championship. In 1983, his final year of competition, he competed in the 14 year old division and won both the AAU New Jersey state championship and AAU national championship before retiring to begin high school.
