= Tony Burse =

American gridiron football player (born 1965)

No. 34, 28
- Position: Running back

Personal information
- Born: April 4, 1965 (age 61); LaFayette, Georgia, U.S.
- Listed height: 6 ft 0 in (1.83 m)
- Listed weight: 220 lb (100 kg)

Career information
- High school: LaFayette
- College: Middle Tennessee State
- NFL draft: 1987: 12th round, 324th overall pick

Career history
- Seattle Seahawks (1987); Miami Dolphins (1988); Seattle Seahawks (1989)*; Sacramento Surge (1991–1992); Dallas Cowboys (1992)*; Detroit Drive/Massachusetts Marauders (1993–1994); Sacramento Gold Miners (1994); San Antonio Texans (1995); Edmonton Eskimos (1996–1998); San Jose SaberCats (1999)*; Buffalo Destroyers (1999); Toronto Argonauts (1999); Buffalo Destroyers (2000); Toronto Argonauts (2000); Buffalo Destroyers (2001)
- * Offseason or practice squad member only

Awards and highlights
- Second-team All-Arena (1994)

Career NFL statistics
- Rushing yards: 36
- Rushing average: 5.1
- Stats at Pro Football Reference

Career AFL statistics
- Rushing yards: 347
- Rushing touchdowns: 20
- Tackles: 34.5
- Passes defended: 10
- Stats at ArenaFan.com

Tony Lee "Bursz" Burse (born April 4, 1965) is an American former professional football player who was a running back for one season with the Seattle Seahawks of the National Football League (NFL). He was selected by the Seahawks in the 12th round of the 1987 NFL draft. He played college football for the Middle Tennessee Blue Raiders. Burse was also a member of the Miami Dolphins, Sacramento Surge, Detroit Drive/Massachusetts Marauders, Sacramento Gold Miners/San Antonio Texans, Edmonton Eskimos, San Jose SaberCats, Buffalo Destroyers and Toronto Argonauts.

== Early life and college ==
Tony Lee Burse was born April 4, 1965, on LaFayette, Georgia. He attended LaFayette High School in LaFayette, Georgia.

Burse played at Middle Tennessee State University for the Blue Raiders from 1983 to 1986.

== Professional career ==
Pre-draft measurables
Height	Weight	Arm length	Hand span	40-yard dash	10-yard split	20-yard split	20-yard shuttle	Vertical jump	Broad jump	Bench press
6 ft 0 in (1.83 m)	220 lb (100 kg)	30 1/2 in (0.77 m)	9 1/2 in (0.24 m)	4.71 s	1.61 s	2.72 s	4.88 s	27.5 in (0.70 m)	8 ft 8 in (2.64 m)	20 reps
All values from NFL Combine

Burse was selected by the Seattle Seahawks of the NFL in the 12th round with the 324th overall pick in the 1987 NFL draft. He was released by the Seahawks in August 1988. He signed with the NFL's Miami Dolphins later in 1988. Burse re-signed with the Seattle Seahawks on March 31, 1989. He was suspended for 30 days on August 12, 1989 for violating the league's substance abuse policy for the second time. He had earlier failed a drug test during the 1988 off-season. Burse was released by the Seahawks on August 16, 1989. He played for the Sacramento Surge of the World League of American Football from 1991 to 1992. He played for the Detroit Drive/Massachusetts Marauders of the Arena Football League (AFL) from 1993 to 1994, earring Second Team All-Arena honors in 1994. Burse played for the Sacramento Gold Miners/San Antonio Texans of the Canadian Football League (CFL) from 1994 to 1995. He played for the Edmonton Eskimos of the CFL from 1996 to 1998. He spent time with the San Jose SaberCats of the AFL in 1999. Burse and Melvin Phillips were traded to the Buffalo Destroyers for Mark Grieb on March 12, 1999. He was placed on the exempt list on October 26, 1999. He played for the Toronto Argonauts of the CFL in 1999. Burse played for the Buffalo Destroyers in 2000. He played for the Toronto Argonauts in 2000. He last played for the Buffalo Destroyers in 2001.
