= Tommy Lee (gridiron football) =

American gridiron football player and coach (born 1941)

Biographical details
- Born: September 11, 1941 (age 85); Honolulu, Hawaii, U.S.
- Education: Willamette

Playing career
- 1959–1962: Willamette
- 1963: Ottawa Rough Riders
- Position: Quarterback

Coaching career (HC unless noted)
- 1974–1981: Willamette
- 1984–1985: Portland State (OC)
- 1986–1990: Montana (OC)
- 1991: San Antonio Riders (OC/QB/WR)
- 1992: San Antonio Riders (WR)
- 1993–1994: Toronto Argonauts (OB/WR)
- 1995–1997: Utah (QB)
- 1998–2000: Utah (OC/QB)
- 2001–2007: Montana Western
- 2012: Hawaii (OC/WR)

Head coaching record
- Overall: 66–79–2
- Tournaments: 0–1 (NAIA playoffs)

Accomplishments and honors

Championships
- 2 Frontier (2002, 2004)

Tommy Lee (born September 11, 1941) is an American former football player and coach. He served as the head football coach at Willamette University from 1974 to 1981, and the University of Montana Western from 2001 to 2007, compiling an overall college football record of 66–79–2. After more than 40 years in the coaching profession, Lee retired from coaching in December 2012.

== Head coaching record ==
=== College ===
Year	Team	Overall	Conference	Standing	Bowl/playoffs	Rank^{#}
Willamette Bearcats (Northwest Conference) (1974–1981)
1974	Willamette	7–2	5–2	3rd		
1975	Willamette	4–5	4–3	4th		
1976	Willamette	4–4–1	4–2–1	4th		
1977	Willamette	5–4	4–2	3rd		
1978	Willamette	3–6	2–3	4th		
1979	Willamette	3–6	3–2	3rd		
1980	Willamette	3–4–1	2–2–1	3rd		
1981	Willamette	4–5	2–3	T–3rd		
Willamette:		33–36–2	26–19–2			
Montana Western Bulldogs (Frontier Conference) (2001–2007)
2001	Montana Western	2–8	2–6	T–3rd		
2002	Montana Western	9–3	7–1	T–1st	L NAIA First Round	15
2003	Montana Western	7–4	6–2	2nd		24
2004	Montana Western	7–4	6–2	T–1st		24
2005	Montana Western	2–9	2–6	4th		
2006	Montana Western	1–9	1–9	T–5th		
2007	Montana Western	5–6	5–5	T–3rd		
Montana Western:		33–43	29–31			
Total:		66–79–2				
National championship Conference title Conference division title or championship game berth
^{#}Rankings from NAIA postseason poll.
