= Bill MacDermott =

American gridiron football player and coach (1936–2016)

Biographical details
- Born: May 14, 1936; Providence, Rhode Island, U.S.
- Died: May 5, 2016 (aged 79); Edmonton, Alberta, Canada

Playing career
- 1950s: Trinity (CT)
- Position: Offensive lineman

Coaching career (HC unless noted)
- 1966–1970: Wesleyan (assistant)
- 1971–1986: Wesleyan
- 1987–1989: Cal Poly (assistant)
- 1990: Toronto Argonauts (assistant)
- 1991–1992: Orlando Thunder (OL)
- 1992: Montreal Alouettes (assistant)
- 1992–1996: Edmonton Eskimos (OL)
- 1997: Winnipeg Blue Bombers (AHC)
- 1997–1998: San Diego Chargers (TE)
- 1999–2006: Edmonton Eskimos (OL)
- 2008: Toronto Argonauts (OL)
- 2010: Edmonton Huskies
- 2011: Saskatchewan Roughriders (RB)
- 2012–2013: Spruce Grove Panthers (RB)
- 2013–2015: Ottawa (ON) (OL)
- 2016: Alberta (OL)

Head coaching record
- Overall: 66–59–3

Bill MacDermott (May 14, 1936 – May 5, 2016) was an American gridiron football coach. He played college football at Trinity College. After graduating from Trinity, he spent the next 50 years as a football coach at the college and professional levels. He was the head football coach at Wesleyan University from 1971 to 1986 and also held coaching positions with California Polytechnic State University, San Luis Obispo, the Orlando Thunder, San Diego Chargers, Montreal Alouettes, Winnipeg Blue Bombers, Toronto Argonauts, and Edmonton Eskimos.

== Biography ==
A native of Providence, Rhode Island, MacDermott graduated in 1960 from Trinity College in Hartford, Connecticut. He began his coaching career in 1961 at Hopkins School in New Haven, Connecticut. He spent six years as the football and wrestling coach at the Hopkins School. From 1966 to 1970, he was an assistant football coach at Wesleyan University in Middletown, Connecticut. He was named Wesleyan's head football coach in December 1970 following the retirement of Don Russell. He continued to hold that position through the 1986 season. In 16 years as the head coach at Wesleyan, MacDermott compiled a record of 66–59–3. His 66 wins rank him third among all head coaches in the history of the Wesleyan football program. During his tenure at Wesleyan, MacDermott coached Bill Belichick, who would himself go on to have a distinguished coaching career in the NFL. MacDermott also served as the wrestling coach at Wesleyan.

MacDermott has also been a football coach for Cal Poly San Luis Obispo, the Orlando Thunder (World League) and the San Diego Chargers (tight ends coach from 1997 to 1998). He later coached in the Canadian Football League for the Montreal Alouettes, Winnipeg Blue Bombers, Toronto Argonauts, and Edmonton Eskimos. In 2010, he took over as the head coach of the Edmonton Huskies. MacDermott died of congestive heart failure on May 5, 2016, in Edmonton.
