= Kent Sullivan =

American football player (born 1964)

No. 1, 7, 10, 8
- Position: Punter

Personal information
- Born: May 15, 1964 (age 62); Plymouth, Indiana, U.S.
- Listed height: 5 ft 11 in (1.80 m)
- Listed weight: 197 lb (89 kg)

Career information
- High school: Northridge (Middlebury, Indiana)
- College: Cal Lutheran (1985–1988)
- NFL draft: 1989: undrafted

Career history
- Chicago Bears (1989)*; Colorado Springs Spirit (1989); Chicago Bears (1990)*; San Antonio Riders (1991); Houston Oilers (1991); San Antonio Riders (1992); Kansas City Chiefs (1992); San Francisco 49ers (1993)*; San Diego Chargers (1993); Houston Oilers (1993); San Diego Chargers (1993); Washington Redskins (1995)*; Chicago Bears (1996)*
- * Offseason or practice squad member only
- Stats at Pro Football Reference

Kent Allen Sullivan (born May 15, 1964) is an American former professional football punter who played in the National Football League (NFL) with the Houston Oilers, Kansas City Chiefs, and San Diego Chargers. He played college football for the Cal Lutheran Kingsmen.

== Early life ==
Kent Allen Sullivan was born on May 15, 1964, in Plymouth, Indiana. He played high school football at Northridge High School in Middlebury, Indiana, and was a two-time varsity letterman.

== College career ==
Sullivan enrolled at California Lutheran College to play college football for the Kingsmen. He was a four-year starter from 1985 to 1988. He averaged 39.6 yards per punt. Sullivan's longest punt was 65 yards and his longest field goal was 52 yards.

== Professional career ==
After going undrafted in the 1989 NFL draft, Sullivan signed with the Chicago Bears on June 20, 1989. He punted six times for the Bear during the preseason. He was released on August 29, 1989, in favor of Maury Buford. Sullivan then went to Colorado Springs to play for the semi-pro Colorado Springs Spirit. He re-signed with the Bears on March 7, 1990, but was later released again on August 26, 1990.

On February 16, 1991, Sullivan was selected by the San Antonio Riders of the World League of American Football (WLAF) in the 1991 WLAF draft. He played in all ten games for the Riders during the 1991 WLAF season, punting 59 times for 2,256 yards (a 38.2 yard average). He also threw a 22-yard touchdown.

Sullivan signed with the Houston Oilers on July 19, 1991. He punted for the Oilers during the 1991 regular season opener while Greg Montgomery was holding out for a better contract. Sullivan was released on September 6, 1991, after Montgomery re-signed with Houston.

Sullivan returned to the Riders in 1992. He appeared in all ten games again, punting 46 times for 1,915 yards and a 41.6 average.

Sullivan was signed by the Kansas City Chiefs on June 22, 1992. He was released on August 25. On December 11, he re-signed with the Chiefs to replace the injured Bryan Barker. Sullivan played in one game for Kansas City, punting six times for 247 yards (a 41.2 average), before being released on December 22, 1992.

On May 7, 1993, Sullivan signed with the San Francisco 49ers. He was released on August 23, 1993.

Sullivan was signed by the San Diego Chargers on September 18, 1993, after John Kidd suffered a back injury. Sullivan punted for the Chargers during the following day's game against the Oilers. He was released on September 22. He signed with San Diego again on October 7, after Kidd hurt his hamstring. Sullivan punted in the October 10 game against the Pittsburgh Steelers. He was released again on October 15, 1993.

Sullivan signed with the Oilers again on November 13, 1993, after Greg Montgomery had back spasms. Sullivan punted for the Oilers the next day against the Cincinnati Bengals. He was released on November 22, 1993.

Sullivan signed with the Chargers for the third time on December 17, 1993. John Kidd had strained his hamstring in practice so Sullivan was signed as insurance in case Kidd was not able to play. Kidd ended up playing and Sullivan did not punt for the Chargers again. He was released on December 25, 1993. He signed with San Diego for the fourth time on April 11, 1994. He was released on August 20, 1994.

Sullivan was signed by the Washington Redskins on May 5, 1995. He was released on August 22, 1995, in favor of Matt Turk.

Sullivan signed with the Bears for the third time in 1996. He competed with 1995 second-round draft pick Todd Sauerbrun. Sullivan was waived on August 19, 1996.

Sullivan was later inducted into the Elkhart County Sports Hall Of Fame.
