= Todd Krumm =

American football player (born 1965)

No. 44, 43
- Position: Defensive back

Personal information
- Born: December 18, 1965 (age 60); Royal Oak, Michigan, U.S.
- Listed height: 6 ft 0 in (1.83 m)
- Listed weight: 189 lb (86 kg)

Career information
- High school: West Bloomfield (MI)
- College: Michigan State (1984–1987)
- NFL draft: 1988: undrafted

Career history
- Washington Redskins (1988)*; Chicago Bears (1988); Orlando Thunder (1992)
- * Offseason or practice squad member only

Awards and highlights
- Second-team All-American (1987); First-team All-Big Ten (1987)

Career NFL statistics
- Interceptions: 2
- Stats at Pro Football Reference

Todd Krumm (born December 18, 1965) is an American former professional football player who was a defensive back for the Chicago Bears of the National Football League (NFL) in 1988. He played college football for the Michigan State Spartans. He also played pro ball for the Orlando Thunder of the World League of American Football in 1992.
