= Greg Lee (defensive back) =

American football player (born 1965)

No. 21, 29
- Position: Defensive back

Personal information
- Born: January 15, 1965 (age 61); Pine Bluff, Arkansas, U.S.
- Listed height: 6 ft 1 in (1.85 m)
- Listed weight: 207 lb (94 kg)

Career information
- High school: Dollarway (Pine Bluff)
- College: Arkansas State
- NFL draft: 1988: undrafted

Career history
- Pittsburgh Steelers (1988); Dallas Cowboys (1990)*; San Antonio Riders (1991-1992)
- * Offseason or practice squad member only

Career NFL statistics
- Games played: 16
- Stats at Pro Football Reference

Gregory Lamont Lee (born January 15, 1965) is an American former professional football player who was a defensive back for one season with the Pittsburgh Steelers of the National Football League (NFL). He went undrafted in the 1988 NFL draft. Lee played college football for the Arkansas State Red Wolves.
