= Rick Mueller =

American football executive (born 1967)

Profile
- Position: General manager

Personal information
- Born: December 4, 1967 (age 58); Spokane, Washington, U.S.

Career information
- College: Puget Sound

Career history

Coaching
- Washington State (1990–1992) Graduate assistant; Sacramento Surge (1992) Defensive assistant coach; Sacramento Gold Miners (1993) Wide receivers coach

Operations
- Sacramento Gold Miners (1994) Director of player personnel; Jacksonville Jaguars (1994–1998) College scout; Jacksonville Jaguars (1998–2000) Director of college scouting; New Orleans Saints (2000–2006) Director of player personnel; New Orleans Saints (2006–2008) Vice president of player personnel; United Football League Vice president & general manager; Omaha Nighthawks (2010–2011) General manager; Philadelphia Eagles (2012–2013) Player personnel executive; Philadelphia Eagles (2014–2016) Director of pro personnel; Coastal Carolina Chanticleers (2018–2020) Executive director of player personnel; Coastal Carolina Chanticleers (2018–2020) Executive director of player personnel; Arlington / Dallas Renegades (2022–2025) Director of player personnel

Awards and highlights
- XFL champion (2023)

Rick Mueller (born December 4, 1967) is an American football executive who recently served as the director of player personnel for the Dallas Renegades of the United Football League (UFL). He past served as the general manager of the Omaha Nighthawks of the United Football League in 2010–2011. He originally joined the league in 2009 as vice president and general manager, acting as the general manager for all four of the UFL's teams in the league's inaugural 2009 season. He was the director of pro personnel for the Philadelphia Eagles of the National Football League (NFL) from 2014 to 2015.
