= Terrence Cooks =

American football player (born 1966)

No. 50, 58
- Position: Linebacker

Personal information
- Born: October 25, 1966 (age 60); New Orleans, Louisiana, U.S.
- Listed height: 6 ft 0 in (1.83 m)
- Listed weight: 230 lb (104 kg)

Career information
- High school: Assumption (Napoleonville, Louisiana)
- College: Nicholls State
- NFL draft: 1989: undrafted

Career history
- New England Patriots (1989); Dallas Cowboys (1990)*; San Antonio Riders (1991–1992)
- * Offseason or practice squad member only

Career NFL statistics
- Games played: 3
- Stats at Pro Football Reference

Terrence Kenneth Cooks (born October 25, 1966) is an American former professional football player who was a linebacker in the National Football League (NFL) and the World League of American Football (WLAF). He played for the New England Patriots of the NFL, and the San Antonio Riders of the WLAF. Cooks played collegiately at Nicholls State University.
