= Albert Williams (gridiron football) =

American football player (born 1964)

No. 94, 72, 54
- Position: Linebacker

Personal information
- Born: September 7, 1964 (age 62); San Antonio, Texas, U.S.

Career information
- College: UTEP
- NFL draft: 1987: undrafted

Career history
- Pittsburgh Steelers (1987); New York Jets (1988)*; Houston Oilers (1989)*; Winnipeg Blue Bombers (1990–1991); San Antonio Riders (1992)
- * Offseason or practice squad member only
- Stats at Pro Football Reference

Albert Donnel Williams (born September 7, 1964) is an American former professional football player who was a linebacker in the National Football League (NFL), Canadian Football League (CFL), and World League of American Football (WLAF). He played for the Pittsburgh Steelers of the NFL, the Winnipeg Blue Bombers of the CFL, and the San Antonio Riders of the WLAF. Williams played college football at the University of Texas at El Paso (UTEP).
