= San Antonio Riders =

American football franchise

Logo

General information
- Founded: 1991
- Folded: 1992
- Stadium: Alamo Stadium (1991); Bobcat Stadium (1992)
- Headquartered: San Antonio, Texas, U.S. (1991); San Marcos, Texas, U.S. (1992)
- Colors: Brown, Metallic Gold, Burnt Orange, White, Scarlet, Blue, Vegas Gold

Personnel
- Head coach: Mike Riley

League / conference affiliations
- World League of American Football (NFL Europe)

The San Antonio Riders were a professional American football team that played in the World League of American Football in 1991 and 1992. The team played at Alamo Stadium in San Antonio in 1991 and then were forced to move to Bobcat Stadium on the campus of Southwest Texas State University (now Texas State University) in San Marcos, Texas, 45 miles (72 km) northeast of San Antonio, for the 1992 season after the San Antonio Independent School District refused to allow the sale of beer at WLAF games or the display of beer advertising at Alamo Stadium. In return, Riders ownership scrapped plans to fund $235,000 in renovations to the Stadium. In June 1991, SAISD officials announced plans for a rent increase on the Riders for the 1992 season. The relationship would last for only one season.

The team was owned by Larry Benson, the brother of Tom Benson (former owner of the New Orleans Saints of the NFL). The general managers were Tom Landry (Pro Football Hall of Fame coach) and Tom Landry, Jr. The head coach for both seasons was Mike Riley.

The team's record in 1991 was 4–6. San Antonio turned things around in 1992 with a mark of 7–3. The Riders were not able to compete in the highly competitive North American West Division during the 1992 season, and like the Frankfurt Galaxy of 1991, they did not make the playoffs despite a 7–3 record.

Former players include professional wrestler John "Bradshaw" Layfield, better known as JBL of World Wrestling Entertainment (WWE), Jason Garrett who went on to play for and later serve as head coach for the Dallas Cowboys, and head coach Mike Riley, who went on to coach the San Diego Chargers of the NFL, as well as Oregon State and Nebraska at the collegiate level.

After the 1992 season saw the suspension of the WLAF (and ultimately the abandonment of North American teams), Benson applied to the Canadian Football League to have the Riders join that league instead for the 1993 season. The CFL accepted, and admitted the Riders and the Sacramento Surge/Gold Miners to the CFL. The Riders were to change names to the San Antonio Texans (there was already a Rough Riders and a Roughriders, both of whom were known as the "Riders" for short), but the team folded abruptly prior to the 1993 season. The San Antonio Texans name would later be used for the aforementioned Gold Miners when they moved to San Antonio in 1995.

== Season-by-season ==
Season	League	Regular season					Postseason			
Season	League	Won	Lost	Ties	Win %	Finish	Won	Lost	Win %	Result
1991	WLAF	4	6	0	.400	2nd (North American West)	–	–	—	—
1992	WLAF	7	3	0	.700	3rd (North American West)	–	–	—	—
Total		11	9	0	.550		–	–	—	

== 1991 season ==
1991 San Antonio Riders season
- Owner: Larry Benson
- General manager: John Peterson
- Head coach: Mike Riley
- Home stadium: Alamo Stadium

Results
- Record: 4–6
- Division place: 3rd
- Playoffs: did not qualify

=== Personnel ===
==== Staff ====
1991 San Antonio Riders staff
Front office: Owner/president – Larry J. Benson; Vice president/general manager – John Peterson; Assistant director of football operations – Billy Schott; Business manager – Greg Korn; Head coaches: Head coach – Mike Riley; Offensive coaches: Offensive coordinator/quarterbacks/wide receivers – Tommy Lee; Running backs/tight ends – Paul Chryst; Offensive line – Jim Gilstrap	Defensive coaches: Defensive coordinator/linebackers – Greg Newhouse; Defensive line/special teams – Don Wnek; Defensive backs – Bill Bradley

==== Roster ====
1991 San Antonio Riders final roster
Quarterbacks: 5 Ben Bennett; 3 Jason Garrett; 10 Mike Johnson; 11 Lee Saltz; Running backs: 23 Ricky Blake; 32 Broderick Graves; 27 Undra Johnson; Wide receivers: 88 John Garrett; 83 Bill Hess; 86 Lee Morris; 84 Dwight Pickens; 80 Elliott Searcy; Tight ends: 87 Charlie Darrington; 82 Ronnie Williams	Offensive linemen: 65 Eddie Grant C/G; 77 James Harper G; 73 John Husby T; 71 Mike Kiselak G; 61 John Layfield T; 79 Brian Smider T; 67 John Vitale C; Defensive linemen: 93 David Bailey DE; 97 John Fletcher DE; 96 Donnie Gardner DE; 99 Greg Ross NT; Special teams: 6 Jim Gallery K; 1 Kent Sullivan P	Linebackers: 50 Terrence Cooks OLB; 55 Greg Gilbert ILB; 94 Mark Ledbetter OLB; 53 Derrick Little ILB; 58 Roderick Manning OLB; 51 Eric Snelson OLB; 57 Tim Walton ILB; Defensive backs: 40 Carlo Cheattom SS; 28 Anthony Cooney FS; 22 Sean Dykes CB; 29 Greg Lee SS; 25 Calvin Nicholson CB; 44 Gary Richard CB; 26 Rickey Royal CB; 24 Ken Watson SS; 46 Kennedy Wilson FS	Operation Discovery: 72 Stefan Bjorkman G; 41 John Hyllienmark FS; 78 Stefan Ohrvall NT; 5 Marco Rueda K; Italics denote rookies to American football

=== Schedule ===
Week	Date	Kickoff	Opponent	Result	Record	Venue	Attendance	Source
1	March 25	8:00 p.m.	at Orlando Thunder	L 34–35	0–1	Florida Citrus Bowl	21,714	
2	April 1	7:00 p.m.	Frankfurt Galaxy	L 3–10	0–2	Alamo Stadium	18,432	
3	April 7	12:00 p.m.	Sacramento Surge	W 10–3	1–2	Alamo Stadium	6,772	
4	April 15	8:00 p.m.	at Raleigh–Durham Skyhawks	W 37–15	2–2	Carter–Finley Stadium	11,818	
5	April 20	7:00 p.m.	Barcelona Dragons	W 22–14	3–2	Alamo Stadium	16,500	
6	April 29	7:00 p.m.	at Birmingham Fire	L 12–16	3–3	Legion Field	8,114	
7	May 6	7:00 p.m.	London Monarchs	L 15–38	3–4	Alamo Stadium	12,328	
8	May 11	8:00 p.m.	at Barcelona Dragons	L 7–17	3–5	Montjuic Stadium	23,670	
9	May 19	11:30 a.m.	Montreal Machine	W 27–10	4–5	Alamo Stadium	20,234	
10	May 25	8:00 p.m.	at New York/New Jersey Knights	L 9–38	4–6	Giants Stadium	32,857	

== 1992 season ==
1992 San Antonio Riders season
- Owner: Larry Benson
- General manager: John Peterson
- Head coach: Mike Riley
- Home stadium: Bobcat Stadium

Results
- Record: 7–3

=== Personnel ===
==== Staff ====
1992 San Antonio Riders staff
Front office: President/Managing Partner – Larry J. Benson; Limited partner – Tom Landry; Vice president/general manager – John Peterson; Business manager – Greg Korn; Assistant director of football operations – Billy Schott; Scouting assistant – Jeff Beathard; Head coaches: Head coach – Mike Riley; Offensive coaches: Running backs – Paul Chryst; Wide receivers – Tommy Lee; Offensive line – Jim Gilstrap	Defensive coaches: Defensive coordinator/linebackers – Greg Newhouse; Defensive line/special teams – Don Wnek; Defensive backs – Bill Bradley

==== Roster ====
1992 San Antonio Riders final roster
Quarterbacks: 8 Brad Goebel; 10 Mike Johnson; 11 Bobby McAllister; Running backs: 27 Tony Boles; 33 Ivory Lee Brown; 34 Dewaine Jones; 30 Cisco Richard; 20 George Searcy; Wide receivers: 81 Darrell Colbert; 89 Titus Dixon; 86 Lee Morris; 80 Wayne Walker; Tight ends: 87 Charlie Darrington; 85 Danta Whitaker; 82 Ronnie Williams	Offensive linemen: 65 Eddie Grant C/G; 71 Mike Kiselak G; 62 Ben Mitchell G/T; 73 Mike Nord T; 52 Erik Norgard G/C; 78 Peter Shorts T; 67 John Vitale C; 75 Doug Williams T; Defensive linemen: 95 Dick Chapura NT; 93 Willie Fears DE; 99 Greg Ross NT; 91 Chris Thieneman DE; 92 Robb White DE; Special teams: 6 Jim Gallery K; 1 Kent Sullivan P	Linebackers: 50 Terrence Cooks OLB; 51 Patrick Hinton ILB; 55 Malvin Hunter ILB; 94 Mark Ledbetter OLB; 57 Tim Walton ILB; 54 Albert Williams OLB; Defensive backs: 28 Anthony Cooney FS; 26 Greg Eaglin CB; 48 Bobby Humphery CB; 29 Greg Lee SS; 24 Chris Oldham FS/SS; 44 Gary Richard CB; 22 Kip Texada CB	Operation Discovery Vacant

=== Results ===
Week	Date	Opponent	Result	Record	Venue	Attendance	Source
1	March 22	Montreal Machine	W 17–16	1–0	Bobcat Stadium	10,698	
2	March 29	at Birmingham Fire	L 10–17	1–1	Legion Field	16,250	
3	April 4	at New York/New Jersey Knights	W 9–3	2–1	Giants Stadium	33,659	
4	April 11	at Sacramento Surge	W 23–20 OT	3–1	Hornet Stadium	20,625	
5	April 19	Ohio Glory	W 17–0	4–1	Bobcat Stadium	10,422	
6	April 25	Birmingham Fire	W 17–14	5–1	Bobcat Stadium	13,590	
7	May 3	Orlando Thunder	L 21–39	5–2	Bobcat Stadium	12,555	
8	May 10	at Barcelona Dragons	W 17–0	6–2	Estadi Olímpic de Montjuïc	41,220	
9	May 17	at Frankfurt Galaxy	W 43–14	7–2	Waldstadion	31,641	
10	May 23	Sacramento Surge	L 21–27	7–3	Bobcat Stadium	19,273	
