= Paul Frazier =

American football player (1967–2018)

No. 32, 20
- Position: Running back

Personal information
- Born: November 12, 1967; Galliano, Louisiana, U.S.
- Died: December 18, 2018 (aged 51); Houston, Texas, U.S.
- Listed height: 5 ft 8 in (1.73 m)
- Listed weight: 188 lb (85 kg)

Career information
- High school: Coushatta (LA)
- College: Northwestern State
- NFL draft: 1989: undrafted

Career history
- New Orleans Saints (1989); Green Bay Packers (1990)*; Sacramento Surge (1991); Dallas Cowboys (1991)*
- * Offseason or practice squad member only

Career NFL statistics
- Rushing yards: 112
- Rushing average: 4.5
- Touchdowns: 1
- Stats at Pro Football Reference

Daniel Paul Frazier (November 12, 1967 – December 18, 2018) was an American professional football player who played for the New Orleans Saints. He played college football at Northwestern State University.

== Personal life ==
He was born in Beaumont, Texas.
