= Chris Gaines (gridiron football) =

American gridiron football player (born 1965)

No. 58, 38
- Position: Linebacker

Personal information
- Born: February 3, 1965 (age 61); Nashville, Tennessee, U.S.
- Listed height: 6 ft 0 in (1.83 m)
- Listed weight: 238 lb (108 kg)

Career information
- High school: DuPont (Hermitage, Tennessee)
- College: Vanderbilt
- NFL draft: 1988: 5th round, 120th overall pick

Career history
- Phoenix Cardinals (1988)*; Miami Dolphins (1988); Tampa Bay Buccaneers (1989)*; Toronto Argonauts (1989–1991)
- * Offseason or practice squad member only

Awards and highlights
- Grey Cup champion (1991); First-team All-American (1987); First-team All-SEC (1987)
- Stats at Pro Football Reference

Christopher Randall Gaines (born February 3, 1965) is an American former professional football linebacker who played one season with the Miami Dolphins of the National Football League (NFL) and three seasons with the Toronto Argonauts of the Canadian Football League (CFL).

== Early life and college ==
Christopher Randall Gaines was born on February 3, 1965, in Nashville, Tennessee. He attended DuPont High School in Hermitage, Tennessee.

Gaines was a four-year letterman for the Vanderbilt Commodores of Vanderbilt University from 1984 to 1987. He recorded two interceptions in 1985 and one interception in 1987. He earned first-team All-American and first-team All-SEC honors in 1987.

== Professional career ==
He was selected by the Phoenix Cardinals in the fifth round of the 1988 NFL draft. He signed with the Cardinals on July 11 but was released on August 30, 1988.

Gaines signed with the Miami Dolphins on September 2, 1988, and played in four games for them before being released on September 29, 1988.

Gaines was signed by the Tampa Bay Buccaneers on April 10, 1989, but later released on August 28, 1989.

Gaines signed with the Toronto Argonauts of the Canadian Football League (CFL) on September 22, 1989. He dressed in 35 games for the Argonauts from 1989 to 1991, recording 216 tackles, nine interceptions, and three sacks. He helped Toronto win the 79th Grey Cup in 1991.

== Post-playing career ==
He was also an assistant coach for the Argonauts and Vanderbilt Commodores after retiring from football due to osteoporosis.

Gaines joined the Green Bay Packers as a scouting assistant in 2019. On July 24, 2022, Gaines was promoted to college scout.

== Personal life ==
Gaines' brother, Greg, played in the NFL for the Seattle Seahawks. Another brother, Brad, played football at Vanderbilt and for the Shreveport Pirates of the CFL.
