= Ray Criswell =

American football player (born 1963)

No. 5, 13, 2
- Position: Punter

Personal information
- Born: August 16, 1963 (age 63); Lake City, Florida, U.S.
- Listed height: 6 ft 0 in (1.83 m)
- Listed weight: 192 lb (87 kg)

Career information
- High school: Orange Park (Orange Park, Florida)
- College: Florida
- NFL draft: 1986: 5th round, 121st overall pick

Career history
- Philadelphia Eagles (1986)*; Los Angeles Raiders (1987)*; Tampa Bay Buccaneers (1987, 1988); Chicago Bears (1989)*; Indianapolis Colts (1990)*; Orlando Thunder (1991–1992)
- * Offseason or practice squad member only

Awards and highlights
- First-team All-American (1985); Second-team All-SEC (1983)

Career NFL statistics
- Punts: 94
- Punt yards: 3,523
- Longest punt: 62
- Stats at Pro Football Reference

Ray Criswell (born August 16, 1963) is an American former professional football player who was a punter in the National Football League (NFL) and World League of American Football (WLAF).

Criswell was born in Lake City, Florida and played scholastically at Orange Park High School. He played collegiately at the University of Florida, where he was a first-team All-America selection as a senior.

Criswell was selected by the Philadelphia Eagles in the fifth round of the 1986 NFL draft with the 121st overall pick. He played for the Tampa Bay Buccaneers (NFL) from 1987 to 1988, and the Orlando Thunder (WLAF) from 1991 to 1992.
