= Nate Hill (American football) =

American football player (1966–2007)

No. 90, 92
- Position: Defensive end

Personal information
- Born: February 21, 1966; LaGrange, Georgia, U.S.
- Died: September 20, 2007 (aged 41); Jackson, Mississippi, U.S.
- Listed height: 6 ft 4 in (1.93 m)
- Listed weight: 273 lb (124 kg)

Career information
- High school: LaGrange (LaGrange, Georgia)
- College: Auburn
- NFL draft: 1988: 6th round, 144th overall pick

Career history
- Green Bay Packers (1988); Miami Dolphins (1988); Washington Redskins (1989); San Diego Chargers (1990)*; Sacramento Surge (1991-1992)
- * Offseason or practice squad member only

Awards and highlights
- Second-team All-SEC (1987)
- Stats at Pro Football Reference

Nathaniel Hill (February 21, 1966 – September 18, 2007) was an American professional football defensive end in the National Football League (NFL) for the Green Bay Packers, Miami Dolphins and Washington Redskins. He played college football at Auburn University and was selected in the sixth round of the 1988 NFL draft.
