= 1987 All-SEC football team =

American college football all-star team

The 1987 All-SEC football team consists of American football players selected to the All-Southeastern Conference (SEC) chosen by various selectors for the 1987 college football season.

== Offensive selections ==
=== Receivers ===
- Lawyer Tillman, Auburn (AP-1)
- Wendell Davis, LSU (AP-1)
- J. R. Ambrose, Ole Miss (AP-2)
- Carl Parker, Vanderbilt (AP-2)

=== Tight ends ===
- Walter Reeves, Auburn (AP-1)
- Brian Kinchen, LSU (AP-2)

=== Tackles ===
- Stacy Searels, Auburn (AP-1)
- David Williams, Florida (AP-2)

=== Guards ===
- Eric Andolsek, LSU (AP-1)
- Harry Galbreath, Tennessee (AP-1)
- Kim Stephens, Georgia (AP-1)
- Greg Kunkel, Kentucky (AP-2)
- Bill Condon, Alabama (AP-2)
- Dermontti Dawson, Kentucky (AP-2)

=== Centers ===
- Nacho Albergamo, LSU (AP-1)
- Daryl Holt, Vanderbilt (AP-2)

=== Quarterbacks ===
- Tommy Hodson, LSU (AP-1)
- Jeff Burger, Auburn (AP-2)

=== Running backs ===
- Bobby Humphrey, Alabama (AP-1)
- Emmitt Smith, Florida (College Football Hall of Fame) (AP-1)
- Mark Higgs, Kentucky (AP-2)
- Lars Tate, Georgia (AP-2)
- Reggie Cobb, Tennessee (AP-2)

== Defensive selections ==
=== Ends ===
- Aundray Bruce, Auburn (AP-1)
- Clifford Charlton, Florida (AP-1)
- Ron Sancho, LSU (AP-2)
- Randy Rockwell, Alabama (AP-2)

=== Tackles ===
- Tracy Rocker, Auburn (AP-1)
- Rhondy Weston, Florida (AP-1)
- Nate Hill, Auburn (AP-2)
- Jerry Reese, Kentucky (AP-2)

=== Middle guards ===
- Willie Wyatt, Alabama (AP-2)

=== Linebackers ===
- Kurt Crain, Auburn (AP-1)
- John Brantley, Georgia (AP-1)
- Chris Gaines, Vanderbilt (AP-1)
- Derrick Thomas, Alabama (AP-1)
- Jeff Herrod, Ole Miss (AP-2)
- Kelly Ziegler, Tennessee (AP-2)
- Keith DeLong, Tennessee (AP-2)

=== Backs ===
- Kevin Porter, Auburn (AP-1)
- Louis Oliver, Florida (AP-1)
- Terry McDaniel, Tennessee (AP-1)
- Chris Carrier, LSU (AP-2)
- Jarvis Williams, Florida (AP-2)
- John Mangum, Alabama (AP-2)
- Todd Sandroni, Ole Miss (AP-2)

== Special teams ==
=== Kicker ===
- Win Lyle, Auburn (AP-1)
- David Browndyke, LSU (AP-2)

=== Punter ===
- Matt DeFrank, LSU (AP-1)
- Bob Garmon, Tennessee (AP-2)

== Key ==
AP = Associated Press

UPI = United Press International

Bold = Consensus first-team selection by both AP and UPI

== See also ==
- 1987 College Football All-America Team
