= Malcolm Frank =

American gridiron football player (born 1968)

No. 31, 10
- Position: Defensive back

Personal information
- Born: December 5, 1968 (age 57); Mamou, Louisiana, U.S.
- Listed height: 5 ft 8 in (1.73 m)
- Listed weight: 170 lb (77 kg)

Career information
- College: Baylor

Career history
- 1991: Seattle Seahawks*
- 1992: Orlando Thunder
- 1992: Seattle Seahawks
- 1993: Seattle Seahawks*
- 1994: Sacramento Gold Miners
- 1995: San Antonio Texans
- 1996–1998, 2002–2006: Edmonton Eskimos
- * Offseason or practice squad member only

Awards and highlights
- 2× Grey Cup champion (2003, 2005); CFL All-Star (2004); 2× CFL West All-Star (2004, 2005); Eskimos' Most Outstanding Defensive Player (2004); Eskimos record most interception return touchdowns – season (5) - 2004
- Stats at Pro Football Reference
- Stats at CFL.ca (archive)

Baldwin Malcolm Frank (born December 5, 1968) is an American former professional football player who was a defensive back in the World League of American Football (WLAF), the National Football League (NFL), and the Canadian Football League (CFL). He won two Grey Cup championships with the Edmonton Eskimos in 2003 and 2005.

== Early life ==
Frank was born in Mamou, Louisiana and played scholastic football at Beaumont Central High School in Texas.

== College career ==
While attending Baylor University, Malcolm Frank was a three-year starter, and finished his career with 5 interceptions, and 131 tackles.

== Professional career ==
Frank began his pro career by signing with the Seattle Seahawks as an undrafted free agent in 1991. He was with the team through training camp, but was released late in the pre-season.

From there he was selected by the Orlando Thunder in the fourth round of the 1992 WLAF Draft.

After a solid WLAF campaign, he returned to the Seahawks, and appeared in 15 games during the 1992 season.

In 1993 he once again was with the Seahawks through training camp, but was again released late in the pre-season.

He then embarked on a long career in the CFL, beginning with the Sacramento Gold Miners in 1994 and the San Antonio Texans in 1995.

He later played with the Edmonton Eskimos, from 1996 to 1998, and after a three-year retirement, from 2002 to 2006. He was an all star in 2004. At the end of the 2006 season Frank retired and now resides in Houston, Texas as a successful CB coach for the Channelview Falcons.
