= Orlando Thunder =

World League of American Football team

General information
- Founded: 1991
- Folded: 1992
- Headquartered: Orlando, Florida
- Colors: Lime Green, Royal Blue, Light Blue, Yellow, White

League / conference affiliations
- World League of American Football

The Orlando Thunder was a member of the World League of American Football from 1991 to 1992. The team played their games in the 70,000 seat Florida Citrus Bowl, and was coached by Don Matthews in 1991 and Galen Hall in 1992. The team's most visible point was their colors – the League wanted to develop new colors which hadn't been used for teams before, hence the vermilion and green that the Raleigh-Durham Skyhawks wore, and the fluorescent green jerseys that the Thunder sported.

The team's general managers were Lee Corso and Dick Beam. In 1991 the team played to a 5–5 record, and in 1992 the team had an outstanding 8–2 record, and made it to the World Bowl II championship game before losing to the Sacramento Surge 21–17. The Thunder's attendance figures fell from over 19,000 per game in its first year to just over 16,000 per game in 1992. The team folded after the 1992 season with the rest of the WLAF's North American operations. The league would later use the team's name (but not its colors or history) for the Berlin Thunder.

Notable players include Kerwin Bell and Scott Mitchell, a left-handed quarterback who went on to play in the NFL for the Miami Dolphins and Detroit Lions and Dan Sileo, who went on to become a famous sports talk radio host.

In 2006, readers of ESPN's Uni Watch column voted the team's jersey 2nd worst football jersey of all time.

== Season-by-season ==
Season	League	Regular season					Postseason			
Season	League	Won	Lost	Ties	Win %	Finish	Won	Lost	Win %	Result
1991	WLAF	5	5	0	.500	2nd (North American East)	–	–	—	Out of playoffs.
1992	WLAF	8	2	0	.800	1st (North American East)	1	1	.500	Lost to Sacramento Surge in World Bowl '92
Total		13	7	0	.650		1	1	.500	

== 1991 season ==
1991 Orlando Thunder season
- General manager: Lee Corso & Dick Beam
- Head coach: Don Matthews
- Home stadium: Florida Citrus Bowl

Results
- Record: 5–5
- Division place: 2nd (North American East)
- Playoffs: Out of playoffs
- Pro Bowlers: N/A

=== Personnel ===
==== Staff ====
1991 Orlando Thunder staff
Front office: Majority Owner – Raj Bhathal; General Manager – Lee Corso; Director of Player Personnel – Jeff Beathard; Head coaches: Head Coach – Don Matthews; Offensive coaches: Offensive Coordinator – Galen Hall; Offensive Line – Bill MacDermott	Defensive coaches: Defensive Coordinator – Dan Daniel; Defensive Line – Pete Catan; Strength and conditioning: Strength and Conditioning – Pete Catan

==== Roster ====
1991 Orlando Thunder roster
Quarterbacks: 12 Kerwin Bell; 10 Clemente Gordon; 5 Tim Peterson; Running backs: 22 Chris Jackson; 25 Myron Jones; 21 Eric Mitchel; 27 Carl Painter; 37 Tommie Stowers; Wide receivers: 87 Bruce LaSane; 89 Chris Roscoe; 83 John Simpson; 88 Byron Williams; Tight ends	Offensive linemen: 65 Doug Aronson G; 73 John Durden T/C; 75 Mike Foust G; 61 John Guerrero G; 64 Owen Hooven T; 52 Rodney Lossow C; 77 Mike Withycombe T; Defensive linemen: 92 Henry Brown NT; 70 Winfred Bryant DE; 94 Charles Jackson NT; 72 Robert Presbury DE	Linebackers: 57 Wayne Davis ILB; 56 Wayne Dickson OLB; 55 Tony Massey ILB; 95 Willie Walker OLB; Defensive backs: 26 Brian Covington CB; 38 Harvey Franklin CB; 23 Mike Nettles SS; 42 Billy Owens FS; 31 Richard Smith CB; 31 Rob Sterling SS (IR); 20 Erroll Tucker CB; 24 Steve Williams CB; Special teams: 6 Charlie Baumann K; 2 Ray Criswell P; 51 John Massimiani LS	Operation Discovery: 91 (West Germany) Helmut Joder DE; 82 (East Germany) Steffen Nagurski WR; 53 (West Germany) Dirk Reessing OLB; Rookies in italics

=== Results ===
Week	Date	Opponent	Result	Record	Venue	Attendance	Source
1	March 25	San Antonio Riders	W 35–34	1–0	Florida Citrus Bowl	21,714	
2	March 30	Raleigh–Durham Skyhawks	W 58–20	2–0	Florida Citrus Bowl	20,811	
3	April 6	at London Monarchs	L 12–35	2–1	Wembley Stadium	35,327	
4	April 14	at Barcelona Dragons	L 13–33	2–2	Montjuic Stadium	40,875	
5	April 21	Birmingham Fire	L 6–31	2–3	Florida Citrus Bowl	21,249	
6	April 27	at New York/New Jersey Knights	L 6–42	2–4	Giants Stadium	30,046	
7	May 4	Frankfurt Galaxy	L 14–17	2–5	Florida Citrus Bowl	11,270	
8	May 11	Sacramento Surge	W 45–33	3–5	Florida Citrus Bowl	20,048	
9	May 20	at Raleigh–Durham Skyhawks	W 20–14	4–5	Carter–Finley Stadium	4,207	
10	May 27	at Montreal Machine	W 33–27 ^{OT}	5–5	Olympic Stadium	23,493	

== 1992 season ==
1992 Orlando Thunder season
- General manager: Lee Corso & Dick Beam
- Head coach: Galen Hall
- Home stadium: Florida Citrus Bowl

Results
- Record: 8–2
- Division place: 2nd (North American East)
- Playoffs: 1–1 (.500), Lost to Sacramento Surge in World Bowl '92
- Pro Bowlers: N/A

=== Personnel ===
==== Staff ====
1992 Orlando Thunder staff
Front office: Majority Owner – Raj Bhathal; Chief Operating Officer/General Manager – Dick Beam; Director of Player Personnel – Pete Levine; Director of Public Relations – John Giantonio; Head coaches: Head Coach/Offensive Coordinator – Galen Hall; Offensive coaches: Passing Game Coordinator/Quarterbacks – Ken Karcher; Running Backs – Pete Levine; Wide Receivers – Wes Chandler; Offensive Line – Bill MacDermott	Defensive coaches: Defensive Coordinator/Linebackers – Charlie Bailey; Defensive Line – Mickey Mays; Defensive Secondary – Pete Kuharchek

==== Roster ====
1992 Orlando Thunder final roster
Quarterbacks: 12 Kerwin Bell; 11 Howard Gasser; 19 Scott Mitchell; Running backs: 22 Darryl Clack; 37 Tommie Stowers; 49 Roger Vick; Wide receivers: 82 Dennis Arey; 84 Grantis Bell; 86 Willie Davis; 83 Chris Ford; 80 Joe Johnson; 85 Stacey Simmons; Tight ends: 89 Michael Titley	Offensive linemen: 73 Kevin Allen T; 65 Doug Aronson G; 77 Jerry Crafts T; 64 Rick Cunningham T; 63 Todd Jones G/C; 52 Rodney Lossow C; 77 Blaine Rose G; Defensive linemen: 70 Winfred Bryant DE; 78 Karl Dunbar DE; 72 Robert Presbury DE; 76 Tracy Rocker DE; 71 Dan Sileo NT; 94 Willie Wyatt NT	Linebackers: 91 Ricky Andrews ILB; 59 Steve Bates OLB; 53 Maurice Crum OLB; 56 Wayne Dickson OLB; 51 Dean Witkowski ILB; Defensive backs: 20 Malcolm Frank CB; 27 Kevin Guidry CB; 43 Todd Krumm FS; 23 Mike Nettles SS; 26 Glenn Rogers CB; 24 Efrum Thomas CB/S; Special teams: 1 Tracy Bennett K; 88 Geep Chryst LS; 2 Ray Criswell P	Operation Discovery vacant Rookies in italics

=== Results ===
Week	Date	Opponent	Results		Game site	Attendance	Source
Week	Date	Opponent	Final score	Team record	Game site	Attendance	Source
1	March 22	Ohio Glory	W 13–9	1–0	Florida Citrus Bowl	10,622	
2	March 28	at Montreal Machine	L 29–31	1–1	Olympic Stadium	36,022	
3	April 5	at Ohio Glory	W 28–3	2–1	Ohio Stadium	31,232	
4	April 12	New York/New Jersey Knights	W 39–21	3–1	Florida Citrus Bowl	31,191	
5	April 19	Montreal Machine	W 16–8	4–1	Florida Citrus Bowl	8,310	
6	April 25	at Frankfurt Galaxy	W 38–0	5–1	Waldstadion	38,104	
7	May 3	at San Antonio Riders	W 39–21	6–1	Bobcat Stadium	12,555	
8	May 9	London Monarchs	W 9–0	7–1	Florida Citrus Bowl	20,268	
9	May 17	at Birmingham Fire	L 23–24	7–2	Legion Field	15,186	
10	May 23	Barcelona Dragons	W 13–10	8–2	Florida Citrus Bowl	12,223	
Postseason
Semifinal	May 30	Birmingham Fire	W 45–7	9–2	Florida Citrus Bowl	28,746	
World Bowl	June 6	vs. Sacramento Surge	L 17–21	9–3	Olympic Stadium	43,759	
