= David Archer (field hockey) =

British field hockey player (1928–1992)

Personal information
- Born: 16 April 1928 Edmonton, London, England
- Died: 25 March 1992 (aged 63) Enfield, London, England

Sport
- Sport: Field hockey
- Position: Goalkeeper
Senior career
| Years | Team | Caps | Goals |
| 1954–1958 | Polytechnic | - | - |
| 1960–1973 | Enfield | - | - |
National team
| Years | Team | Caps | Goals |
| – | Great Britain | | - |
| – | England | | - |

David Douglas Archer (16 April 1928 – 25 March 1992) was a British field hockey player who competed at the 1956 Summer Olympics.

== Biography ==
Archer studied at Regent Street Polytechnic and became their first hockey international for 44 years.

He first played for England during 1954.

Archer represented Great Britain in the field hockey tournament at the 1956 Olympic Games in Melbourne.

He was the honorary secretary of the Marylebone club. After leaving the Polytechnic club he played for Enfield hockey club and became their President in 1973.
