= Mark Stock (American football) =

American football player (born 1966)

No. 80, 82, 84, 12, 10
- Position: Wide receiver

Personal information
- Born: April 27, 1966 (age 60); Canton, Ohio, U.S.
- Listed height: 5 ft 11 in (1.80 m)
- Listed weight: 180 lb (82 kg)

Career information
- College: VMI
- NFL draft: 1989: 6th round, 144th overall pick

Career history
- Pittsburgh Steelers (1989); Green Bay Packers (1991)*; Sacramento Surge (1992); Washington Redskins (1992–1994); San Antonio Texans (1995); Indianapolis Colts (1996)
- * Offseason or practice squad member only

Awards and highlights
- World Bowl champion (1992)

Career NFL statistics
- Receptions: 6
- Receiving yards: 98
- Return yards: 267
- Stats at Pro Football Reference

Mark Anthony Stock (born April 27, 1966) is an American former professional football player who was a wide receiver in the National Football League (NFL) for the Pittsburgh Steelers, Washington Redskins, and Indianapolis Colts. He was selected by the Steelers in the sixth round of the 1989 NFL draft with the 144th overall pick. He also spent a year in the World League of American Football (WLAF) with the World Champions Sacramento Surge and a year in the Canadian Football League (CFL) with the San Antonio Texans. He was a 1988 graduate of Virginia Military Institute and a commissioned officer with the U.S. Army where he spent time on active duty during Operation Desert Storm.

Pre-draft measurables
Height	Weight	40-yard dash	10-yard split	20-yard split	20-yard shuttle	Vertical jump
5 ft 11 1/8 in (1.81 m)	173 lb (78 kg)	4.55 s	1.55 s	2.65 s	4.24 s	33.0 in (0.84 m)
All values from NFL Combine
