= Sacramento Surge =

American football franchise

General information
- Founded: 1991
- Folded: 1992
- Headquartered: Sacramento, California
- Colors: Aqua, Light Gold, Black, White

League / conference affiliations
- World League of American Football (NFL Europe)

Championships
- World Bowls: 1 World Bowl II (1992)

The Sacramento Surge was a professional American football team that played in the World League of American Football (WLAF) in 1991 and 1992. The team played its first season at Hughes Stadium in Sacramento, and the second season in Hornet Stadium on the Sacramento State University campus. It was owned by Managing General Partner Fred Anderson and the General Manager was Michael F. Keller. In charge of Special Projects was Jack Youngblood, who also partnered with Joe Starkey and Ronnie Lott on Surge radio broadcasts on Sacramento radio station KRAK.

The team was coached by former Buffalo Bills quarterback–head coach Kay Stephenson. Charlie Sumner was the defensive coordinator and Jim Haslett was a defensive assistant coach.

The inaugural 1991 season was disappointing for the seven North American teams as none had a winning season, but 3-7 Sacramento managed to provide the only winning record over a Europe based team, 2-0 versus Frankfurt Galaxy, as this was the team they played twice, with the second win at the end of the regular season helping to eliminate Frankfurt Galaxy from the play-offs. Considered the WLAF's second best team, and having just won in Barcelona to secure the tie breaker, all 7-2 Frankfurt had to do was to beat the Surge at home in front of a sell-out crowd of 51,653. Yet, both the clouds and the Surge rained on the Galaxy parade into the semifinals. Two days later, the 9-0 London Monarchs dropped their home match against the Barcelona Dragons which made the Dragons clinch the play-offs instead. After winning the semifinals on US soil, both European franchises met again in Wembley for the World Bowl and a Monarchs shut-out over the Dragons.

The Surge won the World Bowl in 1992, the only United States based team to do so, as the WLAF was discontinued after 1992, returning in 1995 as NFL Europe. On this championship team were future professional wrestler Bill Goldberg and investor Pete Najarian.

After the WLAF ended its American presence at the end of the 1992 season, Anderson continued Sacramento's presence in professional football by acquiring a Canadian Football League expansion franchise for 1993. The new team was named the Sacramento Gold Miners; Stephenson and several Surge players were retained in the change, as were the team colors of aqua and yellow. After 1994, with new US-based CFL expansions, the franchise moved to Texas into the Alamodome. After the 1995 season the CFL presence in the US ended, and so did the San Antonio Texans.

Since 2021, the "Surge" name is used in a franchise for the "Stuttgart Surge" in the newly established "European League of Football" which sees itself as a continuation of WLAF and NFL Europe, having an agreement with the NFL to use "old" franchise names, logos and colors. With the Sacramento Surge having both a 3-0 all-time winning record against the "old" Frankfurt Galaxy name that was revived, and Surge being in line with the S alliteration of team names Stuttgart Scorpions and "Stuttgart Stallions" that were established in the early 1980s as amateur clubs, the Stuttgart fans and members haven chosen to use "Surge" in the EFL, and to continue as Scorpions in the national GFL.

== Season-by-season ==
Season	League	Regular season					Postseason			
Season	League	Won	Lost	Ties	Win %	Finish	Won	Lost	Win %	Result
1991	WLAF	3	7	0	.300	3rd (North American West)	–	–	—	—
1992	WLAF	8	2	0	.800	1st (North American West)	2	0	1.000	World Bowl '92 champions
Total		11	9	0	.550		2	0	1.000	

== 1991 season ==
1991 Sacramento Surge season
- Owner: Fred Anderson
- General manager: Mike Keller
- Head coach: Kay Stephenson
- Home stadium: Hughes Stadium

Results
- Record: 3–7
- Division place: 3rd
- Playoffs: did not qualify

=== Personnel ===
==== Staff ====
1991 Sacramento Surge staff
Front office: Managing General Partner – Fred Anderson; General manager – Mike Keller; Assistant to the General Manager – Cliff Dochterman; Special Projects – Jack Youngblood; Director of Community Relations – Doug Cosbie; Player Personnel Consultant – Bob Griffin; Player Personnel Consultant – Lannie Julias; Head coaches: Head coach – Kay Stephenson; Offensive coaches: Running backs/wide receivers – Bob Owens; Offensive line – Jim Criner; Offensive assistant – Mike Weston	Defensive coaches: Defensive coordinator/defensive backs – Charlie Sumner; Defensive line/linebackers/special teams – Jim Haslett; Defensive assistant – Bob Moran

==== Roster ====
1991 Sacramento Surge final roster
Quarterbacks: 10 Mike Elkins; 11 Todd Ellis; 5 Mickey Guidry; Running backs: 28 Tony Burse; 26 Victor Floyd; 20 Paul Frazier; 22 Leon Perry; Wide receivers: 88 Sammie Archer; 88 Chris Gaiters; 80 Derek Holloway; 86 Carl Parker; 87 Colin Sumner; Tight ends: 81 Mel Farr Jr.	Offensive linemen: 72 John Buddenberg G; 67 Jon Burman T; 54 Byron Forsythe G; 78 Sean Kugler G; 75 Mark Nua T; 76 Doug Robb C/G; 62 Rich Stephens T; 51 Curtis Wilson C; Defensive linemen: 65 John Dominic DE/NT; 96 Nate Hill NT; 98 Kubi Kalombo DE; 77 Shawn Knight DE; 71 Saute Sapolu DE	Linebackers: 52 Anthony Henton OLB; 56 Tim Moore OLB; 50 Peter Najarian ILB; 58 Paul Soltis ILB; 95 Steve Thompson OLB; 59 Rick Zumwalt OLB; Defensive backs: 27 Mike Adams CB; 33 Greg Coauette SS; 23 Bobby Flenoid CB; 45 Tom Gerhart FS/SS; 24 Keith Jenkins CB; 29 Art Malone FS; 21 Robert McWright CB; 25 Mike Wallace CB; Special teams: 2 John Nies K/P	Operation Discovery: 83 (The Bahamas) Ricardo Cartwright WR; 79 (West Germany) Oliver Erhorn DE; 57 (Finland) Matti Lindholm ILB; 74 (Finland) Juha Salo G/T; Rookies in italics

=== Schedule ===
Week	Date	Opponent	Results		Game site	Attendance	Source
Week	Date	Opponent	Final score	Team record	Game site	Attendance	Source
1	Saturday, March 23	Raleigh–Durham Skyhawks	W 9–3	1–0	Hughes Stadium	15,126	
2	Saturday, March 30	at Birmingham Fire	L 10–17	1–1	Legion Field	16,500	
3	Sunday, April 7	at San Antonio Riders	L 3–10	1–2	Alamo Stadium	6,772	
4	Saturday, April 13	Frankfurt Galaxy	W 16–10	2–2	Hughes Stadium	17,065	
5	Monday, April 22	at New York/New Jersey Knights	L 20–28	2–3	Giants Stadium	21,230	
6	Saturday, April 27	Barcelona Dragons	L 20–29 ^{OT}	2–4	Hughes Stadium	19,045	
7	Saturday, May 4	Montreal Machine	L 23–26 ^{OT}	2–5	Hughes Stadium	17,326	
8	Saturday, May 11	at Orlando Thunder	L 33–45	2–6	Florida Citrus Bowl	20,048	
9	Saturday, May 18	London Monarchs	L 21–45	2–7	Hughes Stadium	21,409	
10	Saturday, May 25	at Frankfurt Galaxy	W 24–13	3–7	Waldstadion	51,653	

== 1992 season ==
1992 Sacramento Surge season
- Owner: Fred Anderson
- General manager: Mike Keller
- Head coach: Kay Stephenson
- Home stadium: Hornet Stadium

Results
- Record: 8–2
- Division place: 1st
- Playoffs: World Bowl '92 champion

=== Personnel ===
==== Staff ====
1992 Sacramento Surge staff
Front office: Managing General Partner – Fred Anderson; Partner – Dave Lucchetti; Partner – Jim Anderson; Partner – Bill Pullum; Partner – Dick Baker; General manager – Mike Keller; Assistant to the General Manager – Cliff Dochterman; Director of Marketing Operations – Jack Youngblood; Director of Community Relations – Doug Cosbie; Player Personnel Consultant – Bob Griffin; Player Personnel Consultant – Lannie Julias; Head coaches: Head coach – Kay Stephenson; Offensive coaches: Running backs – Bob Owens; Wide receivers – Bob Moran; Offensive line – Jim Criner	Defensive coaches: Defensive coordinator/linebackers – Jim Haslett; Defensive line – Jim Niblack; Defensive backs – John Fontes; Defensive assistant – Rick Mueller

==== Roster ====
1992 Sacramento Surge final roster
Quarterbacks: 18 David Archer; 5 Mickey Guidry; 11 Lee Saltz; Running backs: 28 Tony Burse; 44 Doug DuBose; 23 Mike Pringle; Wide receivers: 85 Stefon Adams; 88 Eddie Brown; 86 Carl Parker; 82 Mark Stock; Tight ends: 83 Paul Green	Offensive linemen: 72 John Buddenberg G; 54 Byron Forsythe G; 52 Terry Gray G; 76 Jarrod Johnson C; 74 Tom Rehder T; 70 Ernie Rogers T; 62 Rich Stephens T; 51 Josh Taotoai G; 61 Lance Zeno C; Defensive linemen: 93 George Bethune DE; 73 Bill Goldberg DT; 79 Vance Hammond DT; 96 Nate Hill DT; 75 Michael Sinclair DE; 77 David Westbrooks DE	Linebackers: 59 Theron Ellis MLB; 95 Corian Freeman OLB; 55 Mike Jones MLB; 50 Peter Najarian OLB; 56 Basil Proctor OLB; 58 Randy Thornton OLB; Defensive backs: 45 Tom Gerhart FS; 44 Derrick Kelson CB; 21 Robert McWright CB; 24 Tracey Perkins CB; 42 Louis Riddick SS; 22 Junior Robinson CB; Special teams: 15 Cary Blanchard K; 2 John Nies P/K	Operation Discovery Vacant Rookies in italics

=== Schedule ===
Week	Date	Kickoff	Opponent	Results		Game site	Attendance	Source
Week	Date	Kickoff	Opponent	Final score	Team record	Game site	Attendance	Source
1	Saturday, March 21		Birmingham Fire	W 20–6	1–0	Hornet Stadium	17,920	
2	Sunday, March 29		at Ohio Glory	W 17–6	2–0	Ohio Stadium	37,837	
3	Saturday, April 4	2:00 p.m.	Montreal Machine	W 14–7	3–0	Hornet Stadium	21,024	
4	Saturday, April 11		San Antonio Riders	L 20–23 (OT)	3–1	Hornet Stadium	20,625	
5	Saturday, April 18		at Birmingham Fire	L 14–28	3–2	Legion Field	15,794	
6	Sunday, April 26		at London Monarchs	W 31–26	4–2	Wembley Stadium	18,653	
7	Sunday, May 3		at Montreal Machine	W 35–21	5–2	Olympic Stadium	21,183	
8	Saturday, May 9		Frankfurt Galaxy	W 51–7	6–2	Hornet Stadium	22,720	
9	Saturday, May 16		Ohio Glory	W 21–7	7–2	Hornet Stadium	21,272	
10	Saturday, May 23		at San Antonio Riders	W 27–21	8–2	Bobcat Stadium	19,273	
Postseason
Semifinal	Sunday, May 31		Barcelona Dragons	W 17–15	9–2	Hornet Stadium	23,640	
World Bowl	Saturday, June 6	8:10 p.m.	vs. Orlando Thunder	W 21–17	10–2	Olympic Stadium	43,759	
