= Sacramento Gold Miners =

Defunct Canadian Football League franchise

- Logo
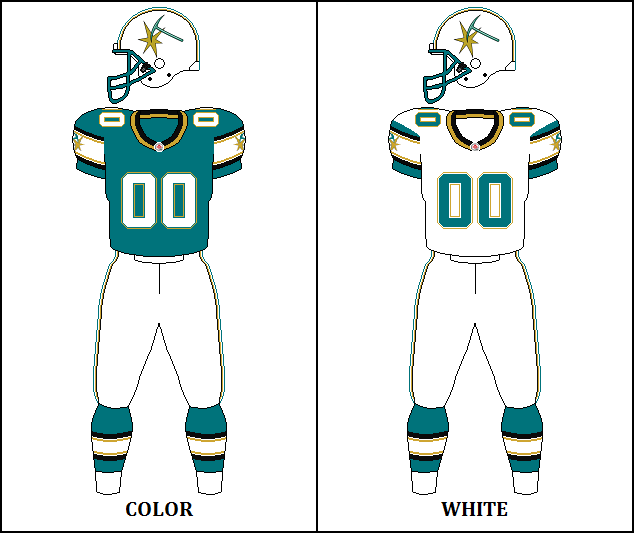
- Uniforms

General information
- Founded: 1993
- Folded: 1994
- Stadium: Hornet Stadium
- Headquartered: Sacramento, California, United States
- Colours: Aqua, old gold, black, and white

Personnel
- Owner: Fred Anderson
- Head coach: Kay Stephenson

League / conference affiliations
- Canadian Football League; West Division

The Sacramento Gold Miners were a Canadian football team based in Sacramento, California. The franchise was the first American team in the Canadian Football League. The Gold Miners inherited a home stadium, front office staff, and much of the roster of the Sacramento Surge from the defunct World League of American Football. The team played its home games at Hornet Stadium.

== History ==
=== On the field ===
==== 1993 season ====
When the WLAF suspended operations in 1992, Surge owner Fred Anderson received a franchise in the CFL after that league expanded to the United States in 1993. The two teams could be seen as one and the same. The two entities had the same colors (aqua and yellow) and head coach (Kay Stephenson). Additionally, several players and administrators made the switch from the WLAF to the CFL. These players included starting quarterback David Archer, Carl Parker (WR), Rod Harris (WR), George Bethune (DT), Mike Oliphant (RB) and Mike Pringle (RB). One notable team administrator was Jack Youngblood, who was the Gold Miners' Director of Marketing in 1993 and 1994, which was a similar post he held with the Surge in 1991 and 1992. Rick Mueller, the team's wide receivers coach (after serving as a defensive assistant with the Surge) and later director of player personnel, later would become general manager of the Omaha Nighthawks in the United Football League.

When the 1993 CFL season started, the Gold Miners, with an all-US staff, took some time to learn the intricacies of Canadian football. But the team was fortunate enough to have leadership from Archer and got great plays from Harris. In their first season, the Sacramento Gold Miners entered the CFL history books by becoming:

- the first American team to play in the CFL;
- the first American team to host a CFL game, against the Calgary Stampeders (losing 38–36) on July 17; and
- the first American team to record a win in the CFL, against the Saskatchewan Roughriders (winning 37–26) on July 24. (However, they were not the first American team to win against a CFL team—see below.)

It is sometimes stated that the Gold Miners were the first American team to play against a Canadian team and to play on Canadian soil when they were the guests of the Ottawa Rough Riders (losing 32–23) on July 7. However, in the 1950s and 1960s, the National Football League and the CFL (and the Interprovincial Rugby Football Union, forerunner of the CFL's East Division) played a series of exhibition games, all in Canada, with the NFL team winning all of those matches. The American Football League also played one game in Canada against a CFL team in 1961, with CFL's Hamilton defeating AFL's Buffalo, 38–21. Prior to that, the Columbus Bullies of the American Football League (1940) played the Winnipeg Blue Bombers in 1941 in a three-game series, which Columbus won, 2 games to 1.

The Gold Miners also entered the CFL record books by recording the most wins by an expansion team with 6 wins (the record was broken the following year by the Baltimore Stallions). The Gold Miners finished the season with a 6–12 record, last place in the West Division. The positives for the franchise were that they had a 5–4 home record and were ranked fifth in team defense. Harris was also selected to the 1993 CFL All-Star Team, which indicated a good mix of players and staff to improve on for the following season.

==== 1994 season ====
In their second season, the Gold Miners were no longer the lone American team as the CFL introduced three new teams: the Las Vegas Posse, the Shreveport Pirates and the Baltimore Stallions (who were known as the CFLers when the NFL did not allow the Colts name to be used). The Gold Miners were once again a part of CFL history when they played against the Las Vegas Posse in Sacramento on July 8, 1994. The game was the first-ever game that involved two American-based teams in the CFL. Las Vegas won the game, 32–26.

The Gold Miners made a decided improvement from their 1993 inaugural season with a 9–8–1 record. They had a 5–3–1 home record and a 4–5 road mark. Sacramento was ranked fourth in team defense, behind Calgary, Edmonton and Baltimore — the teams with the three best records in the league. But the record was only good enough for fifth place in the tough West Division. The Miners would have finished fourth with a 10–7–1 record, if not for a poor call by the officials in the team's last game of the season in Edmonton. Archer appeared to throw a game-winning touchdown pass to Freeman Baysinger, but the officials ruled that it had short-hopped into Baysinger's hands. Replays showed that Baysinger had caught the ball cleanly. As it was, the Gold Miners finished one point behind the 10-8 Saskatchewan Roughriders for the last playoff spot in the West. As it turned out, this would be the last game the team would play in Sacramento.

=== Off the field ===
Despite a mediocre on-field record, the Gold Miners represented a serious attempt to form a viable professional football organization. Anderson and Baltimore Stallions owner Jim Speros were considered the only truly dedicated US CFL owners. Anderson's longtime sidekick Tom Bass handled the day-to-day operations, while coach Kay Stephenson and GM Tom Huiskens handled the football side. As with the team, it took Stephenson some time to adapt to the Canadian game, but he was eventually successful.

However, the Gold Miners were hobbled by substantial off-the-field problems that ultimately proved too much to overcome. Since the San Antonio club that was also supposed to be a part of the 1993 expansion had folded, the Gold Miners were the only American team in the CFL during the 1993 season. Their nearest opponent was the BC Lions, over 890 miles (1,430 km) away. They had to market themselves, receiving no assistance from the CFL. This distance was partially lessened when the CFL added the Las Vegas Posse for the 1994 season, but that team's collapse after only one season left the Gold Miners once again far isolated from even their American competitors (the only other American teams, Shreveport and Baltimore, were 1,900 and 2,700 miles (3,100 and 4,300 km) away, respectively).

Another drag on attendance was Hornet Stadium, which was well below the standards expected for a professional football team. At the time, it was made up mostly of temporary-style bleacher seats. It only had threadbare amenities, and fans were forced to use port-a-potties. The stadium was also uncovered, and offered no protection from Sacramento's often oppressive summer heat. One area in which Hornet Stadium would prove to be ideal was field size; because it was built with a running track, it was relatively easy to accommodate the full length and width of the larger Canadian field (110 yards x 65 yards [with 20 yard endzones] vs 100 yards x 53 1/3 yards [with 10 yard endzones] for the American field) within the track and only cut small portions of the corners, a situation accommodated at a few other Canadian stadiums as well. Attendance did hover around 15,000 per game, but it was widely known that as many as 2,000 of those 15,000 were given free tickets. In 1993 the average home attendance was 16,979, but in 1994 the average home attendance fell to 14,226.

Unable to persuade Sacramento State to upgrade Hornet Stadium to something approaching professional standards, Anderson tried to get the city to build a new stadium for the Gold Miners and his minor-league baseball club, the Modesto A's. He planned to complete a project that had been started several years earlier to lure the then-Los Angeles Raiders to Sacramento, but had ended up being mothballed. Anderson, however, could not come to terms with the local governments. Years later, Sacramento State would upgrade Hornet Stadium to professional standards to accommodate the Sacramento Mountain Lions and the stadium would later be named after Anderson.

=== Move to San Antonio ===
Deciding that Hornet Stadium was inadequate even for temporary use, Anderson decided to look for a new home for the Gold Miners. However, the only other football stadiums in the area, Sacramento City College's Charles C. Hughes Stadium (where the Surge had played in 1991) and UC Davis' Toomey Field, were similarly unacceptable. Hughes Stadium was ruled out because it was used by several high schools; the CFL plays many games on Friday nights, the same night as most American high school football games. Toomey Field seated just over 10,000 people—only half the minimum capacity for a CFL stadium. Even if it could have been expanded, it was only connected to Sacramento by way of the narrow Yolo Causeway. In any event, the CFL frequently plays on Saturdays.

Faced with an unsustainable travel situation and the lack of a suitable facility, Anderson moved the team to San Antonio as the Texans for the 1995 CFL season. San Antonio had the benefits of having a brand-new stadium, the Alamodome, and was geographically close to the American CFL clubs in Shreveport, Memphis, and Birmingham, greatly reducing travel burdens. The Texans only played one season in San Antonio before the CFL exited the American market.

== Seasons ==
Season	League	Finish	Wins	Losses	Ties	Playoffs
1993	CFL	5th, West	6	12	0	No
1994	CFL	5th, West	9	8	1	No

== Radio and television ==
Gold Miners games were broadcast on KFBK radio and KRBK-TV with Tim Roye and Lee Grosscup on radio and Grant Napear and Jack Youngblood on television. Roye replaced Youngblood as TV analyst in 1994 and former San Francisco Giants announcer David Glass became the Miners' radio play-by-play announcer.

== Players and builders of note ==
- David Archer
- Tom Bass
- Kerwin Bell
- George Bethune
- Tony Burse
- David Diaz-Infante
- Malcolm Frank
- Bill Goldberg
- Rod Harris
- Bobby Humphery
- Carl Parker
- Mike Kiselak
- Paul Liggett
- Troy Mills
- Mike Oliphant
- Mike Pringle
- James Pruitt
- Kay Stephenson

== See also ==
- CFL USA all-time records and statistics
- Comparison of Canadian and American football
- 1993 CFL season
- 1994 CFL season
- San Antonio Texans
