= World Bowl '92 =

1992 WLAF Championship game

| Sacramento Surge | Orlando Thunder |
|---|---|
| 21 | 17 |
| | 1 | 2 | 3 | 4 | Total |
|---|---|---|---|---|---|
| SAC | 0 | 6 | 0 | 15 | 21 |
| ORL | 7 | 10 | 0 | 0 | 17 |
- Date: Saturday, June 6, 1992
- Stadium: Olympic Stadium; Montreal, Canada
- MVP: David Archer, Quarterback
- Referee: Stan Kemp
- Attendance: 43,789

TV in the United States
- Network: USA Network
- Announcers: Brad Nessler and Boomer Esiason

World Bowl '92 (also referred to as World Bowl II) was the second championship game of the World League of American Football (WLAF), played on Saturday, June 6, 1992 at Olympic Stadium in Montreal, Quebec, Canada. 43,789 witnessed the matchup between the Sacramento Surge and the Orlando Thunder.

The Surge won the game, 21–17, behind quarterback David Archer's MVP performance (22 completions of 33 attempts for 286 yards, two touchdowns and one interception). The game would be the only World Bowl involving two North American-based WLAF teams, as well as the only World Bowl played on North American soil. It would also be the last game either team would play, and the last WLAF game until 1995 as the league sought to restructure.

== Background ==
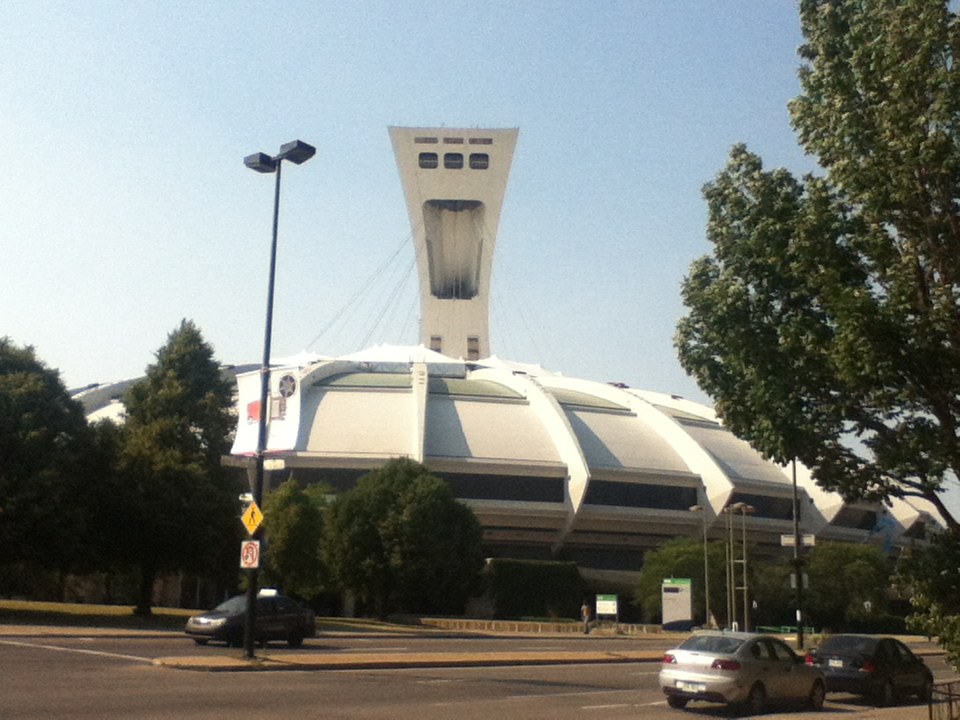
Montreal's Olympic Stadium, where the 1992 World Bowl was played

The Surge and Thunder finished with identical 8–2 records, the best win–loss record in the league. Orlando, the winner of the North American East division, easily handled the Birmingham Fire 45–7 in the playoff semifinal round, while North American West champion Sacramento defeated the Barcelona Dragons, 17–15.

== Game summary ==
The Thunder struck first with a 12-play, 98-yard drive that was capped off when quarterback Scott Mitchell threw a 10-yard touchdown pass to wide receiver Chris Ford for the only score in the first quarter. In the second quarter, the Surge got into the game with Cary Blanchard's 32-yard field goal. The Thunder's second drive was not as successful as the first, so the team had to punt. The Surge's All-World wide receiver Eddie Brown fumbled the punt catch, allowing the Thunder to recover the ball at Sacramento's 9-yard line. Two plays later, Mitchell threw an 8-yard touchdown pass to Willie Davis in the back of the end zone to increase the lead to 14–3. With the first half winding down and the Surge in a desperate attempt to cut the lead, Archer's pass was intercepted by Thunder cornerback Malcolm Frank at midfield and returned to the Sacramento 9-yard line. However, the Surge defense held its ground and forced the Thunder to settle for a 20-yard field goal by Tracy Bennett. Archer then piloted a quick Sacramento drive that resulted in a 24-yard Blanchard field goal that reduced the Thunder lead to 17–6 at the halftime break.

Both sides failed to score in the third quarter. In the fourth quarter, Archer was finally able to get the Surge offense going. He led a 10-play, 85-yard drive that ended with a 12-yard touchdown pass to tight end Paul Green in the back of the end zone. After that score, Archer completed a two-point conversion pass to wide receiver Mark Stock, allowing the Surge to trail by three points (17–14 Thunder). Afterwards, both sides had missed opportunities. A good-looking Orlando drive fell apart as Mitchell fumbled the ball as he got hit in the backfield. The Surge couldn't capitalize on the fumble recovery as its possession ended with a missed field goal attempt. Afterwards, Orlando tried to put together a time-consuming drive that would drain some time and increase the lead, but thanks to the Surge pass rush, Mitchell was intercepted by linebacker Mike Jones, who returned the ball to Orlando's 34-yard line. Sacramento capitalized on the opportunity as Archer completed a 31-yard pass to running back Mike Pringle the start of a 4-play, 34-yard drive that ended with a game-winning 2-yard touchdown pass from Archer to Eddie Brown. Afterwards, the Surge defense denied any chance of an Orlando comeback, assuring Sacramento a World Bowl victory and the WLAF championship, 21–17.

Scoring summary

| Quarter | Time | Drive | | | Team | Scoring information | Score | |
| Quarter | Time | Plays | Yards | TOP | Team | Scoring information | Sacramento | Orlando |
|---|---|---|---|---|---|---|---|---|
| 1 | 3:33 | 12 | 98 | | Orlando | Chris Ford 10-yard touchdown reception from Scott Mitchell, Tracy Bennett kick good | 0 | 7 |
| 2 | 9:44 | 14 | 56 | | Sacramento | 32-yard field goal by Cary Blanchard | 3 | 7 |
| 2 | 6:48 | 2 | 9 | | Orlando | Willie Davis 8-yard touchdown reception from Scott Mitchell, Tracy Bennett kick good | 3 | 14 |
| 2 | 0:54 | 4 | 7 | | Orlando | 20-yard field goal by Tracy Bennett | 3 | 17 |
| 2 | 0:01 | 6 | 72 | | Sacramento | 24-yard field goal by Cary Blanchard | 6 | 17 |
| 4 | 11:27 | 10 | 85 | | Sacramento | Paul Green 12-yard touchdown reception from David Archer, 2-point pass good | 14 | 17 |
| 4 | 5:44 | 4 | 34 | | Sacramento | Eddie Brown 2-yard touchdown reception from David Archer, Cary Blanchard kick good | 21 | 17 |
| "TOP" = time of possession. For other American football terms, see Glossary of American football. | | | | | | | 21 | 17 |
