= Memphis Hound Dogs =

Proposed National Football League team

The Memphis Hound Dogs were a proposed NFL team in the early-1990s. Former Memphis Showboats owner William Dunavant, Paul Tudor Jones, Fred Smith and Elvis Presley Enterprises were the members of the potential ownership group.

In 1993, the NFL invited potential owners from five finalists to make a presentation, after which two teams would be selected as expansion teams. Along with representatives from the Jacksonville Jaguars, Carolina Panthers, Baltimore Bombers and St. Louis Stallions, the potential franchise owners gave a presentation to NFL owners in hopes of attracting an NFL team. Carolina and Jacksonville were chosen to become expansion teams and started in 1995.

After the NFL bid failed, Smith continued his desire to form a football team and contacted the Canadian Football League, then expanding into the United States, who gave him an expansion franchise that would be known as the similarly named Memphis Mad Dogs (the name change is presumably due to Presley's estate not being involved in the franchise). The Mad Dogs played one year in the CFL, but after weeks of declining attendance, the Mad Dogs folded, along with the rest of the American CFL franchises (except the defending champion Baltimore Stallions, who shifted their resources to the then-mothballed Montreal Alouettes franchise). Smith would be credited as an integral figure in bringing the modern Memphis Showboats of the UFL to the city in 2023.

All five of the proposed expansion cities would get NFL teams by 1997 through expansion (Carolina and Jacksonville) or moved franchises (Los Angeles Rams to St. Louis and the Cleveland Browns to Baltimore); however, Memphis's was only temporary, as they hosted the Tennessee Oilers for only one year while Nashville worked out stadium issues. (The original plan was for Memphis to host the Oilers for two years while the Nashville stadium was built, but the city's fans rejected the team, and dismal attendance figures forced an early move to a smaller Vanderbilt Stadium in Nashville.) Yet Memphis would not be without a professional sports team for long, as the Vancouver Grizzlies of the NBA would relocate there in 2001 to become the Memphis Grizzlies, who have remained there since.
