= Memphis Mad Dogs =

Canadian Football League team

- Logo
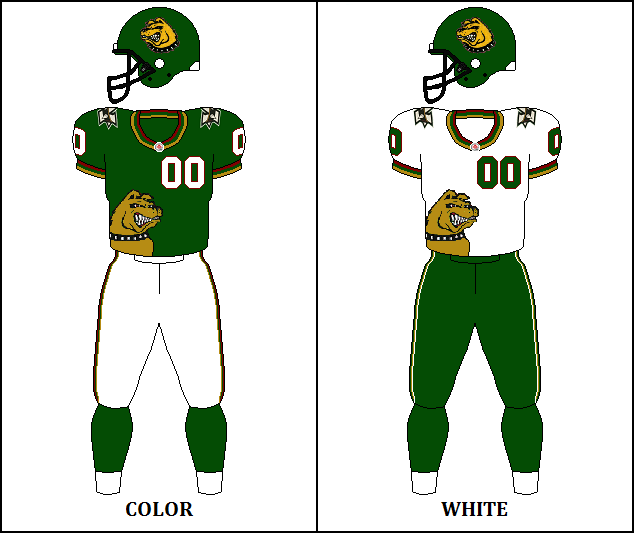
- Uniforms

General information
- Founded: 1995
- Folded: 1995
- Stadium: Liberty Bowl Memorial Stadium
- Headquartered: Memphis, Tennessee, United States
- Colours: Forest green, gold, maroon, black, and white

Personnel
- Owner: Fred Smith
- General manager: Steve Ehrhart
- Head coach: Pepper Rodgers

League / conference affiliations
- Canadian Football League; South Division

The Memphis Mad Dogs were a Canadian football team that played the 1995 season in the Canadian Football League. The Mad Dogs were part of a failed attempt to expand the CFL into the United States. They played at Liberty Bowl Memorial Stadium.

The team's principal owner was Fred Smith, founder of FedEx.

== History ==
Prior to the Mad Dogs, Smith fronted an ownership group (along with such entities as former Memphis Showboats owner William Dunavant and the estate of Elvis Presley) that tried to get a National Football League team into Memphis in 1993. The Memphis Hound Dogs, as the proposed team was to be called, was one of five teams to be considered, but was passed over in favor of the Carolina Panthers and Jacksonville Jaguars. Smith, after briefly considering a proposed "new league" backed by CBS, then turned to the CFL. The league was very impressed with Smith; his group was the richest in CFL history at the time. It seriously considered selling either the Hamilton Tiger-Cats or Calgary Stampeders to Smith. After those teams resolved their ownership situations, Smith's group was granted an expansion franchise for 1995. With Presley's estate no longer involved, the team eschewed "Hound Dogs" in favor of "Mad Dogs," ostensibly through a name-the-team contest.

=== On the field ===
The Mad Dogs hired Pepper Rodgers as their first head coach. Rodgers was familiar to Memphis pro football fans as he was the head coach of one of the city's previous pro football teams, the Memphis Showboats of the USFL; the Mad Dogs had also hired Steve Ehrhart, the Showboats' general manager, in the same capacity. Ehrhart had been trying since 1987 to get the CFL to expand into the United States. The team's mascot was a black Labrador Retriever named Alien, who was known for charging the field and retrieving the kicking tee following each kickoff.

The Mad Dogs tried to copy the Baltimore Stallions' blueprint by getting staff and players who had previous CFL experience. As part of that blueprint, the Mad Dogs hired former CFL coach Adam Rita to become their new offensive coordinator. Rita had coached the Toronto Argonauts and the Edmonton Eskimos to Grey Cup championships in 1991 and 1993. The Mad Dogs then signed veteran QB Damon Allen, who won the Grey Cup with the Eskimos in 1987 and 1993 (the latter with Rita), earning Grey Cup MVP honors in both years. Other notable players on offense included Eddie Brown (SB), Joe Horn (WR) and former NFL kicker Donald Igwebuike.

However, the offense was only able to score a total of 346 points, last in the CFL behind the Ottawa Rough Riders. On a positive note, the Mad Dogs were known for their strong defense that was rated second, behind Edmonton, in the CFL for giving up the fewest points with 364, due in large part to the strong defensive play of Tim Cofield and Rodney Harding.

One of the reasons for poor offense and great defense was the size of the field. The Liberty Bowl was not as well suited to the Canadian game, as the stands were very close to the field of play, making it difficult to reconfigure the field to CFL standards. As a result, even with the addition of AstroTurf cutouts to widen and lengthen the field, it was still narrower and shorter than all other CFL fields, including other US fields which were not regulation. In order to shoehorn even an approximation of a Canadian field onto the playing surface, the end zones became half-grass/half-Astroturf pentagons that were only nine yards long in the middle and seven yards long at the sidelines. CFL rules call for a 20-yard end zone, and no other stadium had end zones shorter than 15 yards. The stands jutted into the corners of the end zones, creating a clear safety hazard.

Memphis ended the 1995 CFL season with a 9–9–0 regular season record, which placed them fourth in the South Division and one game out of the playoffs.

=== Off the field ===
Pepper Rodgers was known around the football world as a likable man. However, he often made uncomplimentary remarks about the Canadian Football League, which also showed signs that the CFL's foray into the United States was doomed to failure from the start.

The team drew relatively well during the first two months of the season. While the crowds were not nearly as large as those the Showboats or Southmen had drawn, they were still comparable to those for the established CFL franchises. However, the Mad Dogs had their legs cut out from under them by quirks in the CFL schedule. The CFL traditionally plays on Thursdays, Fridays and Saturdays — the same days as high school and college football games in the United States - largely to avoid competing on television (both in its native country and the U.S.) with the National Football League. Smith realized that the Mad Dogs could not hope to draw respectable crowds if they had to go head-to-head with high school games on Fridays and Tennessee Volunteers, Ole Miss Rebels football, and Mississippi State on Saturdays. The Birmingham Barracudas, also based in a high school and college football hotbed, faced the same problem. With this in mind, Smith and Barracudas owner Art Williams persuaded the CFL to let their teams play late-season home games on Sundays. They apparently believed that attempting to compete with NFL broadcasts in markets that did not support any one NFL team in particular was the more sensible risk to take. It did not work; several late season games in Memphis drew crowds of fewer than 10,000, dropping the team's average attendance to around 14,550 by the end of the season. As early as September, Smith was blaming community indifference and outright hostility from the media for the team's steep decline at the gate.

Tim Cofield became the only Mad Dogs player to win the James P. McCaffrey Trophy as the Most Outstanding Defensive Player of the South Division.

=== In the end ===
Due to massive losses and the late-season attendance collapse, the Mad Dogs folded at the December 1995 CFL meetings.

By February 1996, the Barracudas, Texans and Shreveport Pirates had also folded while the Stallions had reconstituted themselves as the third incarnation of the Montreal Alouettes, ending the CFL's three-year experiment south of the border.

Besides financial and attendance problems, the Mad Dogs were hobbled by the promotional efforts of the CFL itself. The league positioned itself directly against the NFL when it attempted to move south of the border. The CFL adopted the marketing slogan, "Longer, Wider, Faster" to appeal to the American football market. Rodgers had expressed frustration in the efforts to market the Mad Dogs and Canadian football to the Mid-South.

=== After the Mad Dogs ===
The city of Memphis would go on to host several more professional football franchises. The most notable was the Liberty Bowl's hosting of the NFL's Tennessee Oilers for the 1997 season. The plan was for the Oilers, who were to be based in Nashville once a new stadium was ready, to play two full seasons in Memphis because the city had the state's only stadium that was ideally sized for the NFL at the time. The largest stadium in Nashville at the time, Vanderbilt Stadium, seated only 41,000 people and was deemed too small even for temporary use. The state's largest stadium, Neyland Stadium in Knoxville, seated over 102,000 people, far too large to sell out in time to avoid local blackouts. If successful, it could have set Memphis up to make another bid on the expansion franchise that was to be awarded in the wake of the Cleveland Browns relocation controversy (what eventually became the Houston Texans).

However, like the Mad Dogs, the Oilers proved to be an attendance disaster in Memphis. Due to Memphians' unwillingness to support a lame-duck team and Nashvillians' reluctance to travel on Interstate 40 to see "their" team play, Oilers games didn't draw much more than the Mad Dogs had drawn even on a good day and often drew more opponents' fans than Oilers fans. The Oilers backed out of the Memphis arrangement after only one season and played the 1998 season at Vanderbilt.

The Memphis Pharaohs played two seasons in the Arena Football League, their first concurrent with the Mad Dogs, in 1995 and 1996. In 2001, Memphis would host the XFL's Memphis Maniax. in 2019, the AAF's Memphis Express and the 2000s AF2's Memphis Xplorers. The Xplorers would last for six seasons. A second incarnation of the Memphis Showboats played in the United Football League, again with Fred Smith's sponsorship until his death; the Showboats eventually collapsed due to Smith's death, poor attendance, and an incoming owner who disliked the size of the Liberty Bowl. Memphis would also have success in other professional sports, landing another Canadian export with the relocation of the Vancouver Grizzlies in 2001, which became the Memphis Grizzlies that have been playing there ever since.

== Seasons ==
Season	League	Finish	Wins	Losses	Ties	Playoffs
1995	CFL	4th, South	9	9	0	No

== Players of note ==
- Gary Anderson, running back
- Derrick Atterberry, cornerback
- Eddie Brown
- Bobby Dawson, defensive back
- Alex Gordon, linebacker
- Joe Horn, wide receiver
- Donald Igwebuike

=== Canadian Football Hall of Famers ===
- Damon Allen, quarterback
- Greg Battle, linebacker
- Rodney Harding, defensive tackle

== See also ==
- CFL USA all-time records and statistics
- Comparison of Canadian and American football
- 1995 CFL season
