= St. Louis Stallions =

Proposed NFL expansion team

The St. Louis Stallions was the name of a proposed National Football League (NFL) franchise which was to be located in St. Louis, Missouri, in the early 1990s. There were two attempts to get a team with that name in St. Louis, which had been without a professional football franchise since the end of the 1987 season, when the Cardinals left the city to move to Phoenix, Arizona.

== Expansion attempt ==
The first attempt to get a team back in St. Louis came in 1991 as the NFL was looking to expand. Initially planning this for the 1994 season (the expansion would not actually take place until the following year), the NFL accepted bids from several cities including St. Louis for consideration. The others were:

- Baltimore, which like St. Louis had seen its team, the Colts, move out of town in 1984
- Charlotte, which had been seeking a team since 1987 and had already seen an expansion NBA team awarded to the city
- Jacksonville, which had seen several aborted attempts at relocation in recent years and had been home to the Jacksonville Bulls of the United States Football League during the 1980s
- Memphis, who had been trying to get an NFL franchise since at least the mid-1970s when owners of the city's World Football League team. The Memphis Southmen, attempted to force their way into the league by filing an antitrust lawsuit.

St. Louis was to have placed the Stallions in Busch Stadium, where the football and baseball Cardinals played, for a brief period while a new domed stadium was constructed near the city's America's Center. Although St. Louis had been considered a favorite to land a team, the NFL instead announced in 1993 that the Charlotte and Jacksonville groups were declared the winners and that the Carolina Panthers and Jacksonville Jaguars would begin play in 1995.

== First relocation attempt ==
After St. Louis came up short in its expansion bid, it appeared that the city might land a new team anyway. Advertising executive James Orthwein, a St. Louis native and member of the Busch family, bought the New England Patriots in 1992 from Victor Kiam to resolve a debt between local sportscaster Doug Vaughn and the two men. The Patriots had long been in financial malaise since original owner Billy Sullivan, who was still the team president during Kiam's ownership, had squandered all of his net worth on a series of bad investments in the mid-1980s and was forced to sell the team to Kiam and Foxboro Stadium to Robert Kraft.

Immediately upon purchase, Orthwein made it clear that he wanted to relocate the team from its Foxborough, Massachusetts, home to the Mound City. With the city of St. Louis having begun construction on the new domed stadium that they had discussed in their expansion bid, Orthwein was set to leave New England at the end of the 1993 season.

Orthwein's plans to move the team were thwarted when Kraft refused to let Orthwein out of the long-term lease that he had secured from Kiam and Sullivan as part of his purchase of the stadium. Orthwein did not want to own the team if he could not move it, and Kraft initiated a hostile takeover that resulted in his purchase of the Patriots in 1994.

== St. Louis finally gets a team ==
During the 1994 season Georgia Frontiere, the owner of the Los Angeles Rams, was having trouble finding a new stadium for her team as the city of Los Angeles and the surrounding area was not willing to have taxpayer money pay for it. At the time, the Rams were playing in Anaheim Stadium, to which the team had moved in 1980 from the Los Angeles Memorial Coliseum and which had required a massive reconstruction in order for the Rams to be able to play in what was originally only intended to be a home for the California Angels. Frontiere, who inherited control of the team following the death of her husband Carroll Rosenbloom in 1979, decided that relocation was the only option and initially considered Baltimore, the city where her husband originally owned the Colts before he traded ownership of the team with Robert Irsay, before deciding on St. Louis (her home city) as the domed stadium that was originally intended for the Stallions franchise was nearing completion. The NFL initially was unwilling to allow the move out of Los Angeles, and in fact had voted to reject it, but acquiesced after Frontiere threatened to sue the league. Unlike the Patriots/Stallions proposal, Frontiere opted to keep the Rams name.

Shortly after the Rams left, the Raiders also left to move back to Oakland, where they had last played in 1981. The Trans World Dome, which the completed stadium became known as, opened on November 12, 1995, with a game against the expansion Carolina Panthers.

=== Departure ===
A major problem with St. Louis was that their fixed-roof and fully covered domed stadium was built at a time when retractable and translucent roofs, which the latter allowed generous daylight dissipation through the roof material, were becoming the norm. The lighting within the stadium was also noted as 'warehouse-like' and unable to light the field properly, and the darker blue and gold shades the Rams adopted for their logo and uniforms in the early 2000s exacerbated the situation further. Because of its dual use as an extension of the America's Center convention center, the field continued to use AstroTurf, a long-outdated brand of artificial turf that was used primarily for its ability to be easily moved and rolled up into storage, even after its most recent renovations (most other stadiums had already gone to permanent FieldTurf or similar installations by this point; it was eventually converted to an AstroTurf-branded surface that more resembled FieldTurf, though this dark surface only increased the dreary feel of the stadium). By the early 2010s, the dome was consistently considered one of the worst stadiums in the NFL. On January 12, 2016, the NFL approved a request by Rams owner Stan Kroenke to move the Rams back to the Greater Los Angeles area and returned to play at the Los Angeles Memorial Coliseum. The Rams opened and began playing at SoFi Stadium in Inglewood, California in 2020. The team's move left St. Louis without an NFL team and no realistic prospects of gaining one in the immediate future, barring future expansion or relocation. (The city managed to receive a spring league team when the revived XFL established the St. Louis BattleHawks, who currently play in the UFL and play their home games in the Rams' former home.)
