= List of proposed NFL teams =

Proposed NFL teams

The formation and evolution of National Football League (NFL) teams have been shaped by a combination of expansions, relocations, and mergers. Established in 1920 as the American Professional Football Association, the NFL began with 14 teams, many of which were rooted in small towns and industrial cities. As the popularity of American football grew, the league strategically expanded to incorporate teams exclusively from larger markets, with the Green Bay Packers being the only exception. Notable expansions include the addition of the Minnesota Vikings in 1961 and the Atlanta Falcons in 1966.

Relocation has also played a significant role in the NFL's history, with teams moving to new cities to access larger markets, modern facilities, or more favorable economic conditions. For instance, the Cleveland Rams moved to Los Angeles in 1946, becoming the first NFL team on the West Coast. The Oakland Raiders relocated to Los Angeles in 1982, returned to Oakland in 1995, and later moved to Las Vegas in 2020. Similarly, the St. Louis Cardinals moved to Arizona in 1988, becoming the Phoenix (now Arizona) Cardinals.

Mergers have further shaped the league's structure. The most significant was the 1970 merger between the NFL and the American Football League (AFL), leading to the formation of a unified league with two conferences: the American Football Conference (AFC) and the National Football Conference (NFC). This merger integrated AFL teams into the NFL framework.

The process of establishing a new NFL team involves securing approval from existing team owners, demonstrating financial stability, and ensuring the presence of adequate facilities and a supportive fan base. Prospective owners must present comprehensive plans that align with the league's strategic objectives, including market potential and long-term viability. Once approved, new teams build their rosters through mechanisms like the NFL draft, free agency, and trades, aiming to assemble competitive squads that resonate with their communities.

== Proposed NFL teams ==
- Seattle Kings
- Baltimore Bombers
- Memphis Hound Dogs
- St. Louis Stallions
- London

== See also ==
- List of defunct NFL franchises
