= Baltimore Ravens =

NFL team in Baltimore, Maryland

- Current season
| Logo | Wordmark |
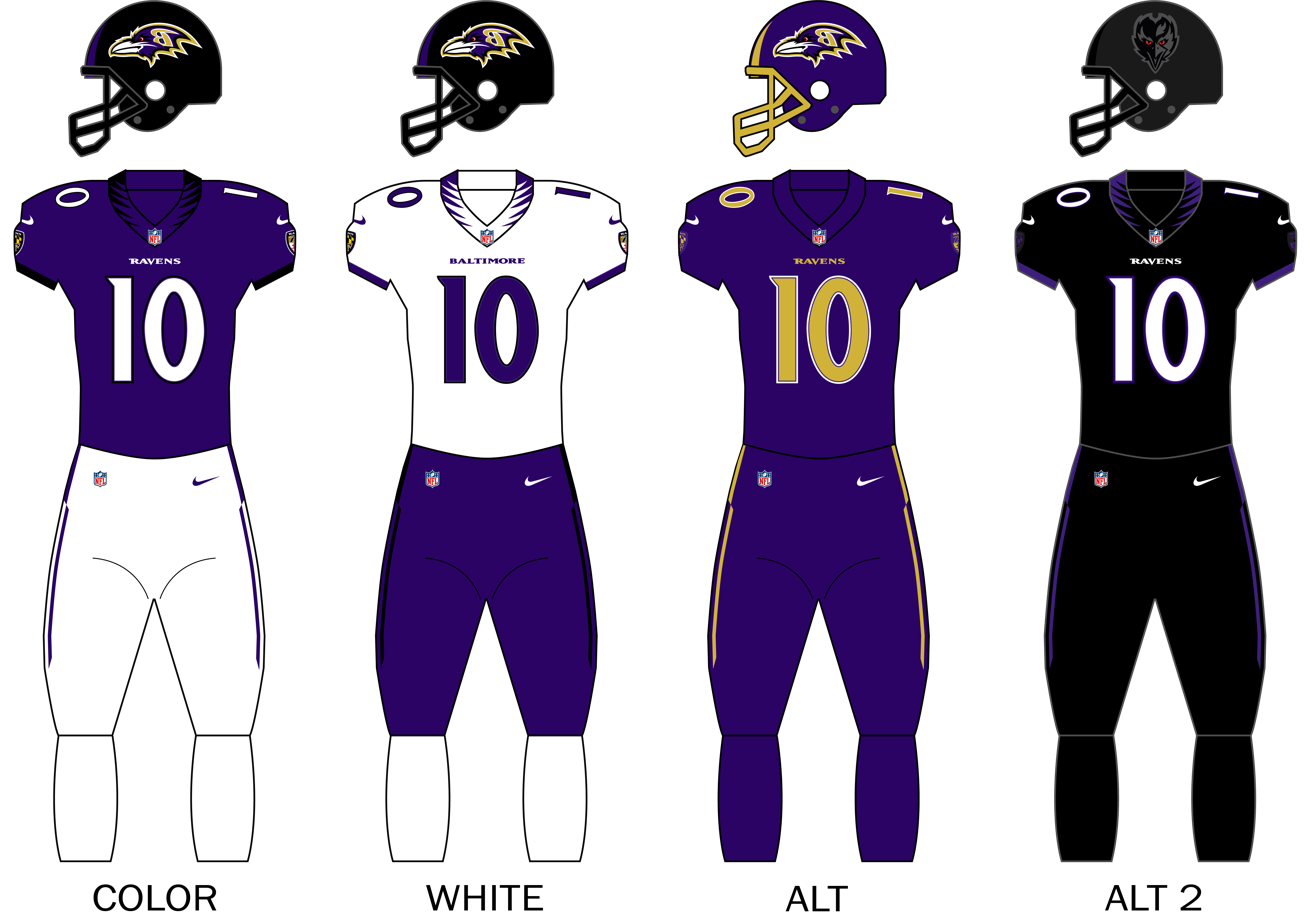
- Uniforms

General information
- Founded: February 9, 1996; 30 years ago
- Stadium: M&T Bank Stadium; Baltimore, Maryland
- Headquartered: Under Armour Performance Center; Owings Mills, Maryland
- Colors: Purple, black, metallic gold
- Fight song: "The Baltimore Fight Song"
- Mascot: Edgar, Allan, and Poe (costumed mascots); Rise and Conquer (live ravens)
- Website: baltimoreravens.com

Personnel
- Owner: Steve Bisciotti
- General manager: Eric DeCosta
- Head coach: Jesse Minter
- President: Sashi Brown

Team history
- Baltimore Ravens (1996–present)

Home fields
- Baltimore Memorial Stadium (1996–1997); M&T Bank Stadium (1998–present)

League / conference affiliations
- National Football League (1996–present): American Football Conference (1996–present); AFC Central (1996–2001); AFC North (2002–present)

Championships
- Super Bowl championships: 2 2000 (XXXV), 2012 (XLVII)
- Conference championships: 2: AFC: 2000, 2012
- Division championships: 8: AFC North: 2003, 2006, 2011, 2012, 2018, 2019, 2023, 2024

Playoff appearances (16)
- NFL: 2000, 2001, 2003, 2006, 2008, 2009, 2010, 2011, 2012, 2014, 2018, 2019, 2020, 2022, 2023, 2024

Owners
- Art Modell (1996–2004); Steve Bisciotti (2004–present)

The Baltimore Ravens are a professional American football team based in Baltimore. The Ravens compete in the National Football League (NFL) as a member of the American Football Conference (AFC) North division. The team plays its home games at M&T Bank Stadium and is headquartered in Owings Mills, Maryland.

The Baltimore Ravens were established in 1996 after Art Modell, then owner of the Cleveland Browns, announced plans in 1995 to move the franchise from Cleveland to Baltimore. As part of a settlement between the league and the city of Cleveland, Modell was required to leave the Browns' history, team colors, and records in Cleveland for a replacement team and replacement personnel that would resume play in 1999. In return, he was allowed to take his own personnel and team to Baltimore, where such personnel would form an expansion team. On March 27, 2000, Modell sold a 49 percent stake in the team to tech investor Steve Bisciotti of Aerotek for $275 million. The agreement included an option for Bisciotti to purchase an additional 50 percent for $325 million in 2004, while Modell retained a 1 percent stake until his death in 2012. Bisciotti became the Ravens’ majority owner on April 9, 2004, completing a total purchase valued at $600 million. In 2023, the franchise was valued at $4.63 billion, the world's 28th-most valuable sports franchise.

As of the 2025 season, the Ravens have a regular season record of 276–208–1 (.570), the third-highest winning percentage among active franchises, and the fourth-highest playoff winning percentage at 18–14 (.563). The team has qualified for the NFL playoffs 16 times since 2000 with two Super Bowl titles (XXXV and XLVII), two AFC Championship titles (2000 and 2012), five AFC Championship game appearances (2000, 2008, 2011, 2012, and 2023), and eight AFC North division titles (2003, 2006, 2011, 2012, 2018, 2019, 2023, and 2024). They and the Tampa Bay Buccaneers are the only teams undefeated in multiple Super Bowl appearances. The Ravens organization was led by general manager Ozzie Newsome from 1996 until he retired after the 2018 season; it has had four head coaches: Ted Marchibroda, Brian Billick, John Harbaugh and Jesse Minter. Starting with a record-breaking defensive performance in their 2000 season, the Ravens have established a reputation for strong defensive play. Former players such as middle linebacker Ray Lewis, safety Ed Reed, and offensive tackle Jonathan Ogden have been enshrined in the Pro Football Hall of Fame.

== History ==
=== Team name ===
The name "Ravens" was inspired by Edgar Allan Poe's poem The Raven. Chosen in a fan contest that drew 33,288 voters, the allusion honors Poe who spent the early part of his career in Baltimore and is buried there. Other names polled included "Marauders", "Americans", and "Bombers", among others. As The Baltimore Sun reported at the time, fans also "liked the tie-in with the other birds in town, the Orioles, and found it easy to visualize a tough, menacing black bird". Edgar Allan Poe also had distant relatives who played football for the Princeton Tigers in the 1880s through the early 1900s. These brothers were famous players in the early days of American football.

Before the football team, there was the Baltimore Ravens wheelchair basketball team — the original Baltimore Ravens. In 1972, the Ravens wheelchair basketball team was founded by Ralph Smith, long-time resident of Baltimore, second Vice President of the National Wheelchair Basketball Association (NWBA) and Member of the NWBA Hall of Fame. The name "Ravens" was inspired by Bob Ardinger, a member of the Ravens wheelchair basketball team. In the 1990s, the naming rights were later sold to the football team when they came to the city and the wheelchair basketball team became known as the Maryland Ravens.

=== Background ===
After the Colts moved in 1984 to Indianapolis, numerous attempts were made to bring an NFL team back to Baltimore. In 1993, ahead of the 1995 league expansion, the city was considered a favorite, behind only St. Louis, to be granted one of two new franchises. League officials and team owners feared litigation due to conflicts between rival bidding groups if St. Louis was awarded a franchise. In October Charlotte, North Carolina, was the first city chosen. Several weeks later, Baltimore's bid for a franchise—dubbed the Baltimore Bombers, in honor of the locally produced Martin B-26 Marauder bomber—had three ownership groups in place and a state financial package which included a proposed $200 million, rent free stadium and permission to charge up to $80 million in personal seat license fees. Baltimore, however, was unexpectedly passed over in favor of Jacksonville, Florida, despite Jacksonville's minor TV market status and that the city had withdrawn from contention in the summer, only to return with former Commissioner Paul Tagliabue's urging. Although league officials denied that any city had been favored, it was reported that Tagliabue and his longtime friend Washington Redskins owner Jack Kent Cooke had lobbied against Baltimore due to its proximity to Washington, DC, and that Tagliabue had used the initial committee voting system to prevent the entire league ownership from voting on Baltimore's bid. This led to public outrage and The Baltimore Sun describing Tagliabue as having an "Anybody But Baltimore" policy. Maryland governor William Donald Schaefer said afterward that Tagliabue had led him on, praising Baltimore and the proposed owners while working behind the scenes to oppose Baltimore's bid.

By May 1994, Baltimore Orioles owner Peter Angelos had gathered a new group of investors, including author Tom Clancy, to bid on teams whose owners had expressed interest in moving. Angelos found a potential partner in Georgia Frontiere, who was open to moving the Los Angeles Rams to Baltimore. Jack Kent Cooke opposed the move, intending to build the Redskins' new stadium in Laurel, Maryland, close enough to Baltimore to cool outside interest in bringing in a new franchise. This led to heated arguments between Cooke and Angelos, who accused Cooke of being a "carpetbagger". The league eventually persuaded Rams team president John Shaw to move to St. Louis instead, leading to a leaguewide rumor that Tagliabue was again steering interest away from Baltimore, a claim that Tagliabue denied. In response to anger in Baltimore, including Governor Schaefer's threat to announce over the loudspeakers Tagliabue's exact location in Camden Yards any time he attended a Baltimore Orioles game, Tagliabue said of Baltimore's financial package, "Maybe [Baltimore] can open another museum with that money." After that, Angelos made an unsuccessful $200 million bid to bring the Tampa Bay Buccaneers to Baltimore.

Having failed to obtain a franchise via the expansion, the city, despite having "misgivings", turned to the possibility of obtaining the Cleveland Browns, whose owner Art Modell was financially struggling and at odds with the city of Cleveland over desired improvements to the team's stadium.

=== Return of American football in Baltimore ===
Enticed by Baltimore's available funds for a first-class stadium and a promised yearly operating subsidy of $25 million, Modell announced on November 6, 1995, his intention to move the team from Cleveland to Baltimore the following year. The resulting controversy ended when representatives of Cleveland and the NFL reached a settlement on February 8, 1996. Tagliabue promised the city of Cleveland that an NFL team would play in Cleveland, either through relocation or expansion, "no later than 1999". The agreement also stipulated that the Browns' name, colors, uniform design and franchise records would remain in Cleveland. The franchise history includes Browns club records and connections with Pro Football Hall of Fame players. Modell's Baltimore team, while retaining all current player contracts, would, for purposes of team history, appear as an expansion team, a new franchise. Not all players, staff or front office would make the move to Baltimore.

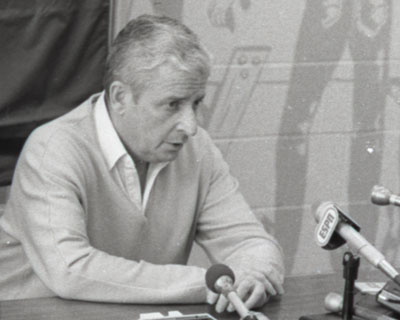
Art Modell moved the Browns to Baltimore and remained the owner of the Ravens through 2003.

As the team prepared to open the 1996 season in Baltimore, Modell hired a new head coach: Ted Marchibroda, known for his work as head coach of the Baltimore Colts during the 1970s and the Indianapolis Colts during the early 1990s. Ozzie Newsome, the Browns' tight end for many seasons, joined Modell in Baltimore as director of football operations. He was later promoted to vice president/general manager.

The home stadium for the Ravens first two seasons was Baltimore's Memorial Stadium, previously home to the Baltimore Colts, the Baltimore Orioles, and the Canadian Football League's Baltimore Stallions.

=== The early years and Ted Marchibroda era (1996–1998) ===
In the 1996 NFL draft, the Ravens, with two picks in the first round, drafted offensive tackle Jonathan Ogden at No. 4 overall and linebacker Ray Lewis at No. 26 overall. Both Ogden and Lewis went on to play for the Ravens for their entire professional careers and were both inducted into the Pro Football Hall of Fame.

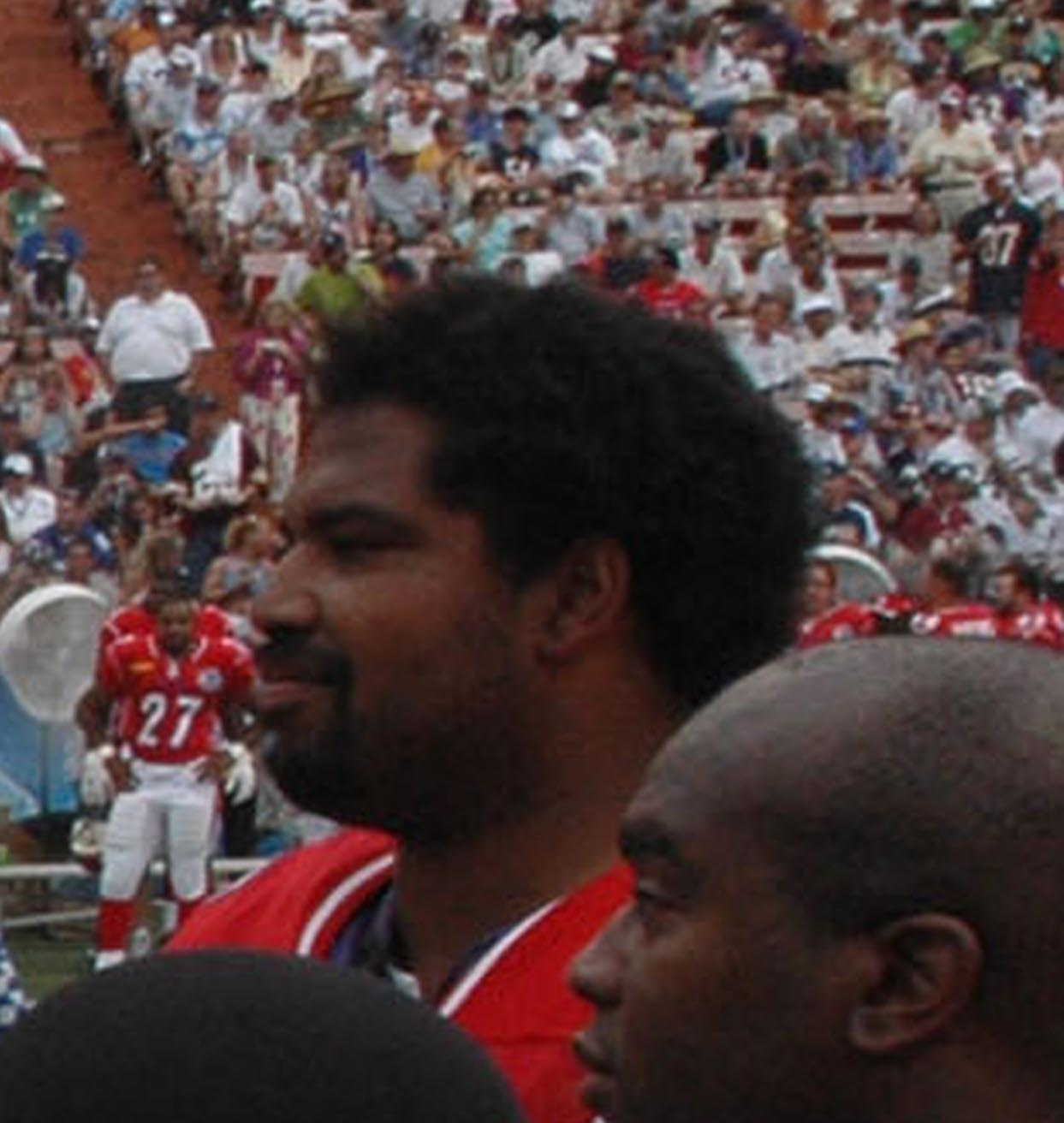
Jonathan Ogden at the 2006 Pro Bowl. Ogden played offensive tackle for the Ravens from 1996 through 2007 and was elected to the Pro Football Hall of Fame in 2013.

The 1996 Ravens won their opening game against the Oakland Raiders, but finished the season 4–12 despite receiver Michael Jackson leading the league with 14 touchdown catches. The 1997 Ravens started 3–1. Peter Boulware, a rookie defender from Florida State, recorded 11.5 sacks and was named AFC Defensive Rookie of the Year. The team finished 6–9–1. On October 26, the team made its first trip to Landover, Maryland to play their new regional rivals, the Washington Redskins. The Ravens won the game 20–17. On December 14, 1997, the Ravens played the final professional sporting event at Baltimore's historic Memorial Stadium, winning 21–19 over the Tennessee Oilers.

In 1998, the Ravens moved to a brand-new stadium, next to Camden Yards: PSINet Stadium, named for after the now-defunct internet service provider which purchased the original naming rights. It is now known as M&T Bank Stadium.

Quarterback Vinny Testaverde left for the New York Jets before the season, and was replaced by former Indianapolis Colt Jim Harbaugh, and later Eric Zeier. Cornerback Rod Woodson joined the team after a successful stint with the Pittsburgh Steelers, and Priest Holmes started getting the first playing time of his career and ran for 1,000 yards. The Ravens finished 1998 with a 6–10 record. On November 29, the Colts played in Baltimore for the first time in 15 years. Amid a shower of boos for the Colts, the Ravens won 38–31.

=== Brian Billick era (1999–2007) ===
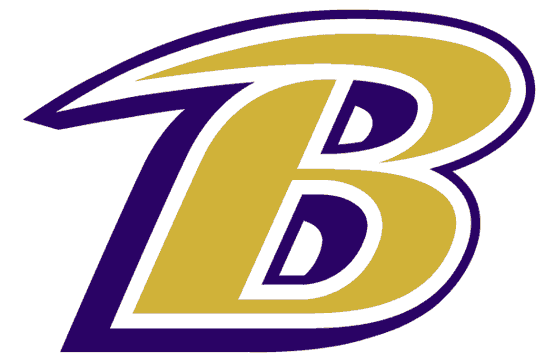
Baltimore's text logo

Marchibroda was fired after three consecutive losing seasons. Brian Billick took over as head coach in 1999. Billick had been offensive coordinator for the record-setting Minnesota Vikings the season before. Quarterback Tony Banks came to Baltimore from the St. Louis Rams and had the best season of his career with 17 touchdown passes and an 81.2 pass rating. He was joined by receiver Qadry Ismail, who posted a 1,000-yard season. The Ravens initially struggled with a record of 4–7 but managed to finish with an 8–8 record.

==== 2000: Super Bowl XXXV champions ====
Banks shared playing time in the 2000 regular season with Trent Dilfer. Both players put up decent numbers (and a 1,364-yard rushing season by rookie Jamal Lewis helped too) but the defense became the team's hallmark and bailed a struggling offense out in many instances through the season. Ray Lewis was named Defensive Player of the Year. Two of his defensive teammates, Sam Adams and Rod Woodson, made the Pro Bowl. Baltimore's season started strong with a 5–1 record. But the team struggled through midseason, at one point going five games without scoring an offensive touchdown. The team regrouped and won each of their last seven games, finishing 12–4 and making the playoffs for the first time.

During the 2000 season, the Ravens' dominating defense broke a notable NFL record. They held opposing teams to 165 total points, surpassing the 1985 Chicago Bears mark of 187 points for a 16-game season, which at that time was the current NFL record. That record still stands, and the 2000 Ravens remain in the discussion as one of the greatest NFL defenses of all time, most notably alongside the 1985 Chicago Bears defense.

Since the divisional rival Tennessee Titans had a record of 13–3, the Ravens had to play in the wild card round. They dominated the Denver Broncos 21–3 in their first game. In the divisional playoff, they went on the road to Tennessee. With the score tied 10–10 in the fourth quarter, an Al Del Greco field goal attempt was blocked and returned for a touchdown by Anthony Mitchell, and a Ray Lewis interception return for a score put the game squarely in Baltimore's favor. The 24–10 win put the Ravens in the AFC Championship against the Oakland Raiders. The game was rarely in doubt. Shannon Sharpe's 96-yard touchdown catch early in the second quarter followed by an injury to Raiders quarterback Rich Gannon were crucial as the Ravens won easily, 16–3.

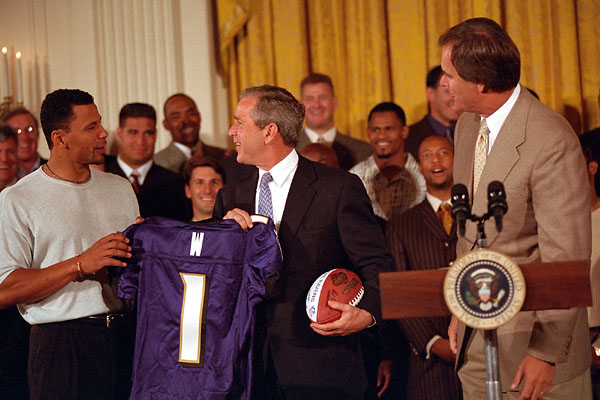
The Ravens meet President George W. Bush in 2001. Bush is at center. On the left is Rod Woodson, and on the right is Brian Billick.

Baltimore then went to Tampa for Super Bowl XXXV against the New York Giants. The Ravens' defense carried them to a win. They recorded four sacks and forced five turnovers, one of which was a Kerry Collins interception returned for a touchdown by Duane Starks. The Giants' only score was a Ron Dixon kickoff return for a touchdown; however, the Ravens immediately countered with a touchdown return on the next kickoff by Jermaine Lewis. The Ravens became champions with a 34–7 win.

==== 2001–2007 ====
In 2001, the Ravens attempted to defend their title with Elvis Grbac as their new starting quarterback, but a season-ending injury to Jamal Lewis on the first day of training camp and poor offensive performances stymied the team. After a 3–3 start, the Ravens defeated the Minnesota Vikings in the final week to clinch a wild card berth at 10–6. In the first round the Ravens showed flashes of their previous year with a 20–3 win over the Miami Dolphins, in which the team forced three turnovers and outgained the Dolphins 347 yards to 151. In the divisional playoff the Ravens played the Pittsburgh Steelers. Three interceptions by Grbac ended the Ravens' season, as they lost 27–10.

Baltimore ran into salary cap problems entering the 2002 season and was forced to part with a number of impactful players. In the NFL draft, the team selected Ed Reed with the 24th overall pick. Reed would go on to become one of the best safeties in NFL history, making nine Pro Bowls until leaving the Ravens for the Houston Texans in 2013. Despite low expectations, the Ravens stayed somewhat competitive in 2002 until a losing streak in December eliminated any chances of a postseason berth and a 7–9 finish.

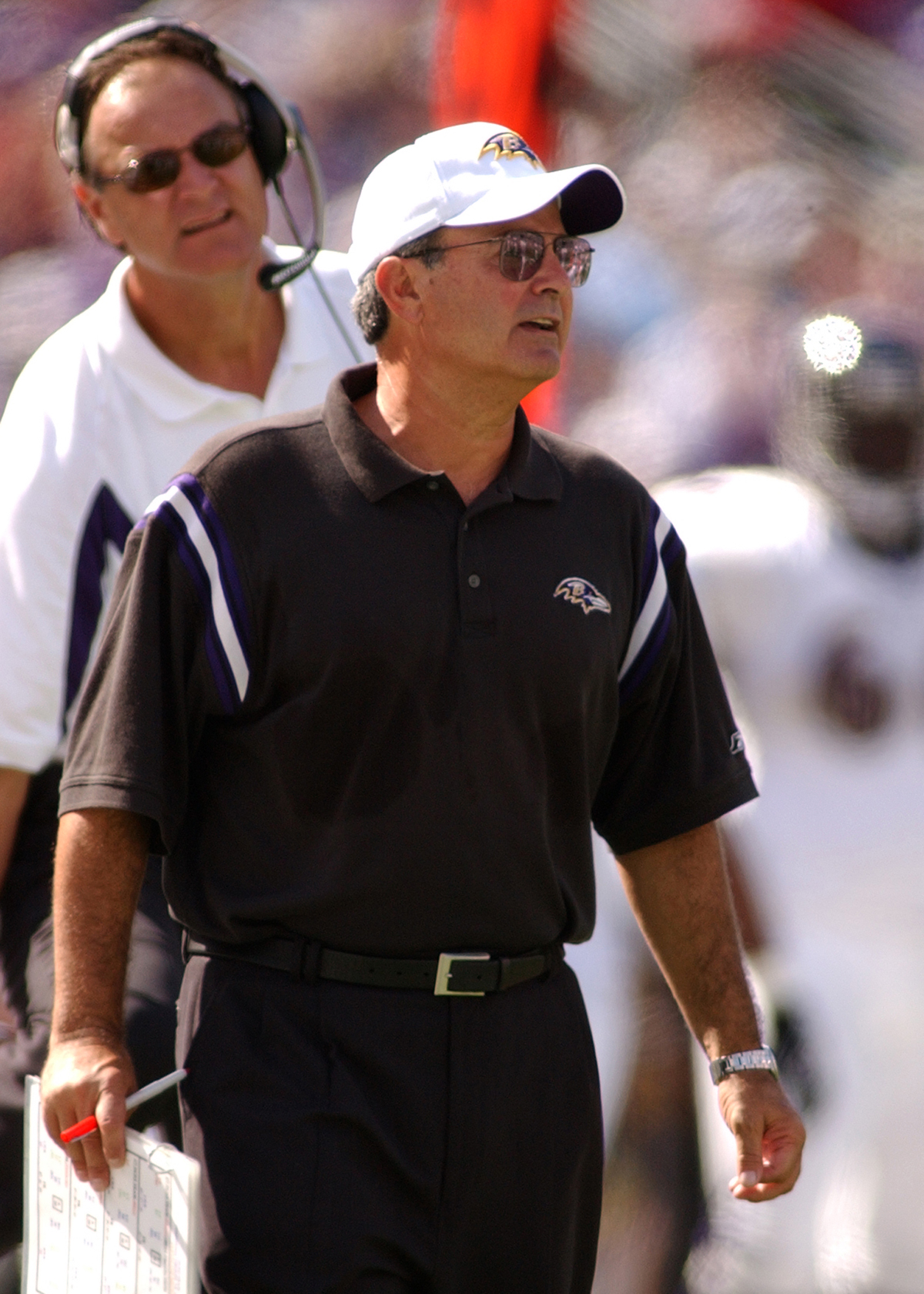
Coach Gary Zauner (front) and Brian Billick with the Baltimore Ravens in 2003.

In 2003, the Ravens drafted their new quarterback, Kyle Boller, but he was injured midway through the season and was replaced by Anthony Wright. Jamal Lewis ran for 2,066 yards (including a then-NFL record 295 yards in one game against the Cleveland Browns on September 14). With a 10–6 record, Baltimore won their first AFC North division title. Their first playoff game, at home against the Tennessee Titans, went back and forth, with the Ravens being held to only 54 yards total rushing. The Titans won 20–17 on a late field goal, and Baltimore's season ended early.

Ray Lewis was also named Defensive Player of the year for the second time in his career.

The Ravens did not make the playoffs in 2004 and finished the season with a record of 9–7 with Boller spending the season at QB. They did get good play from veteran corner Deion Sanders and third-year safety Ed Reed, who won the NFL Defensive Player of the Year award. They were also the only team to defeat the 15–1 Pittsburgh Steelers in the regular season. The next off-season, the Ravens looked to augment their receiving corps (which was second-worst in the NFL in 2004) by signing Derrick Mason from the Titans and drafting Oklahoma wide receiver Mark Clayton in the first round of the 2005 NFL draft. However, the Ravens ended their season 6–10.

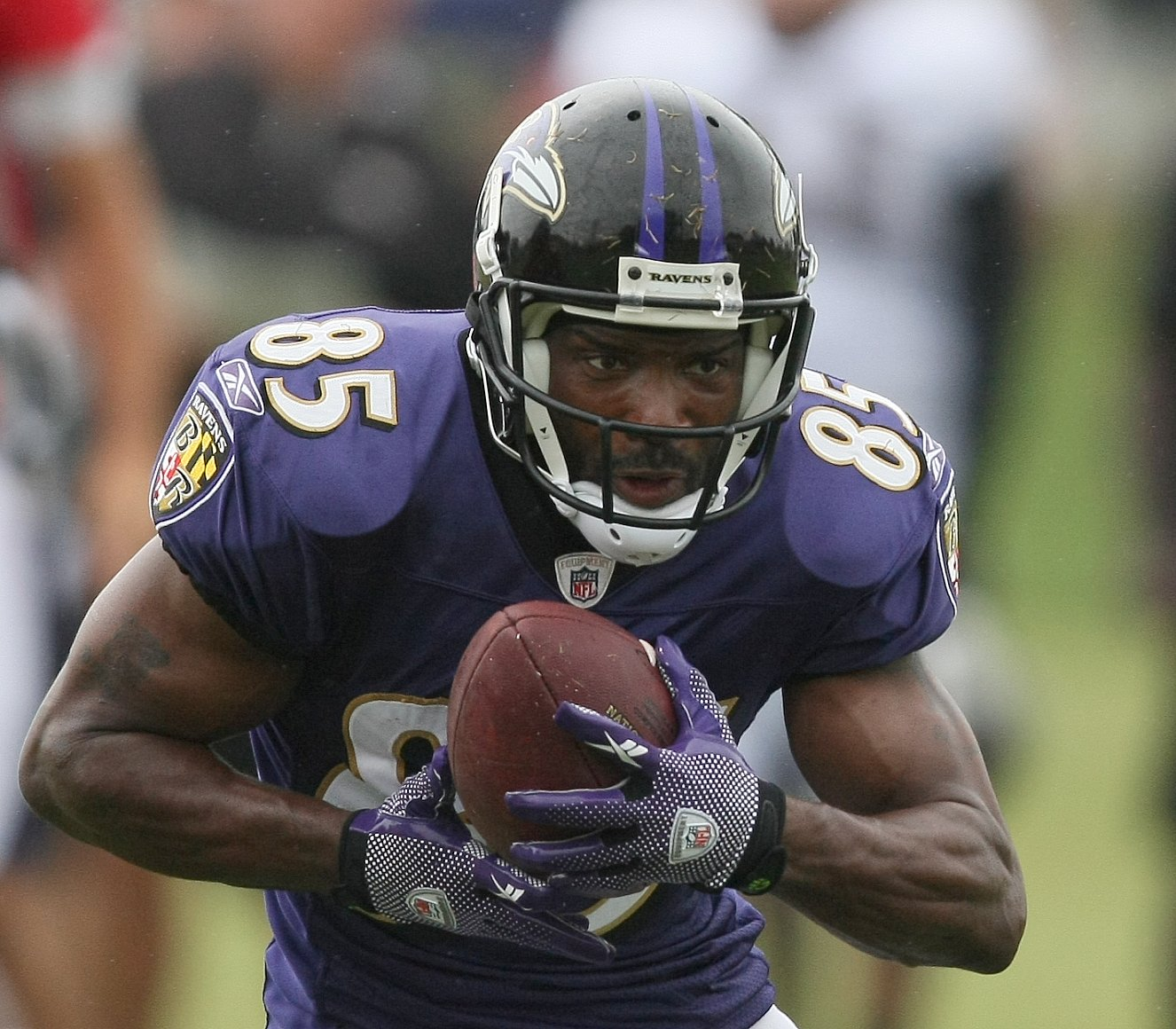
Derrick Mason played mainly as the Ravens No. 1 receiver from 2005 through 2010.

The 2006 Baltimore Ravens season began with the team trying to improve on their 6–10 record of 2005. The Ravens, for the first time in franchise history, started 4–0, under the leadership of former Titans quarterback Steve McNair.

In 2006, The Ravens lost two straight games midseason on offensive troubles, prompting coach Billick to drop their offensive coordinator Jim Fassel in their week seven bye. After the bye, and with Billick calling the offense, Baltimore would record a five-game win streak before losing to the Cincinnati Bengals in week 13. Still ranked second overall to first place San Diego Chargers, the Ravens continued on. They defeated the Kansas City Chiefs, and held the defending Super Bowl champion Pittsburgh Steelers to only one touchdown at Heinz Field, allowing the Ravens to clinch the AFC North.

The Ravens ended the regular season with a franchise-best 13–3 record. Baltimore had secured the AFC North title, the No. 2 AFC playoff seed, and clinched a 1st-round bye by season's end. The Ravens were slated to face the Indianapolis Colts in the second round of the playoffs, in the first meeting of the two teams in the playoffs. Many Baltimore and Indianapolis fans saw this historic meeting as a sort of "Judgment Day" with the new team of Baltimore facing the old team of Baltimore (the former Baltimore Colts having left Baltimore under questionable circumstances in 1984). Both Indianapolis and Baltimore were held to scoring only field goals as the two defenses slugged it out all over M&T Bank Stadium. McNair threw two costly interceptions, including one at the 1-yard line. The eventual Super Bowl champion Colts won 15–6, ending Baltimore's season.

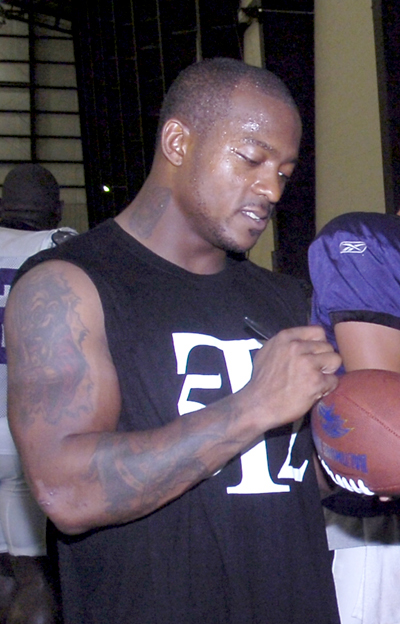
Willis McGahee played four seasons as a running back for the Ravens.

The Ravens hoped to improve upon their 13–3 record but injuries and poor play plagued the team. The Ravens finished the 2007 season in the AFC North cellar with a disappointing 5–11 record. A humiliating 22–16 overtime loss to the previously winless Miami Dolphins on December 16 ultimately led to Billick's dismissal after the end of the regular season. He was replaced by John Harbaugh, the special teams coach of the Philadelphia Eagles and the older brother of former Ravens quarterback Jim Harbaugh (1998).

=== John Harbaugh/Joe Flacco era (2008–2018) ===
==== 2008: Arrival of Harbaugh and Flacco ====
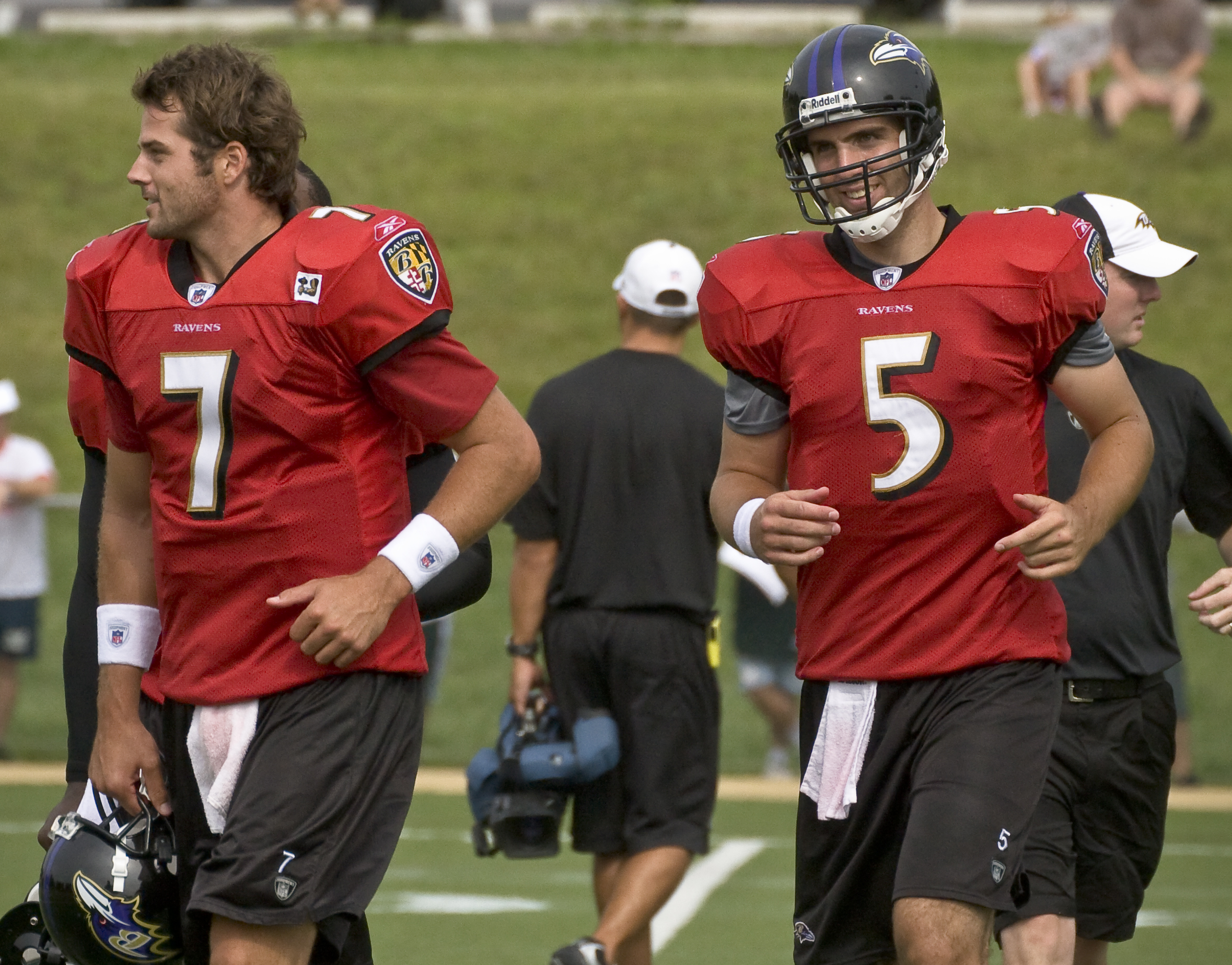
Joe Flacco (right) and Kyle Boller during 2008 training camp.

With rookies at head coach (John Harbaugh) and quarterback (Joe Flacco), the Ravens entered the 2008 campaign with much uncertainty. Baltimore smartly recovered in 2008, winning eleven games and achieving a wild card spot in the postseason. On the strength of four interceptions, one resulting in an Ed Reed touchdown, the Ravens began its postseason run by winning a rematch over Miami 27–9 at Dolphin Stadium on January 4, 2009, in a wild-card game. Six days later, they advanced to the AFC Championship Game by avenging a Week 5 loss to the Titans 13–10 at LP Field on a Matt Stover field goal with 53 seconds left in regulation time. The Ravens fell one victory short of Super Bowl XLIII by losing to the Steelers 23–14 at Heinz Field on January 18, 2009.

==== 2009–2011 ====
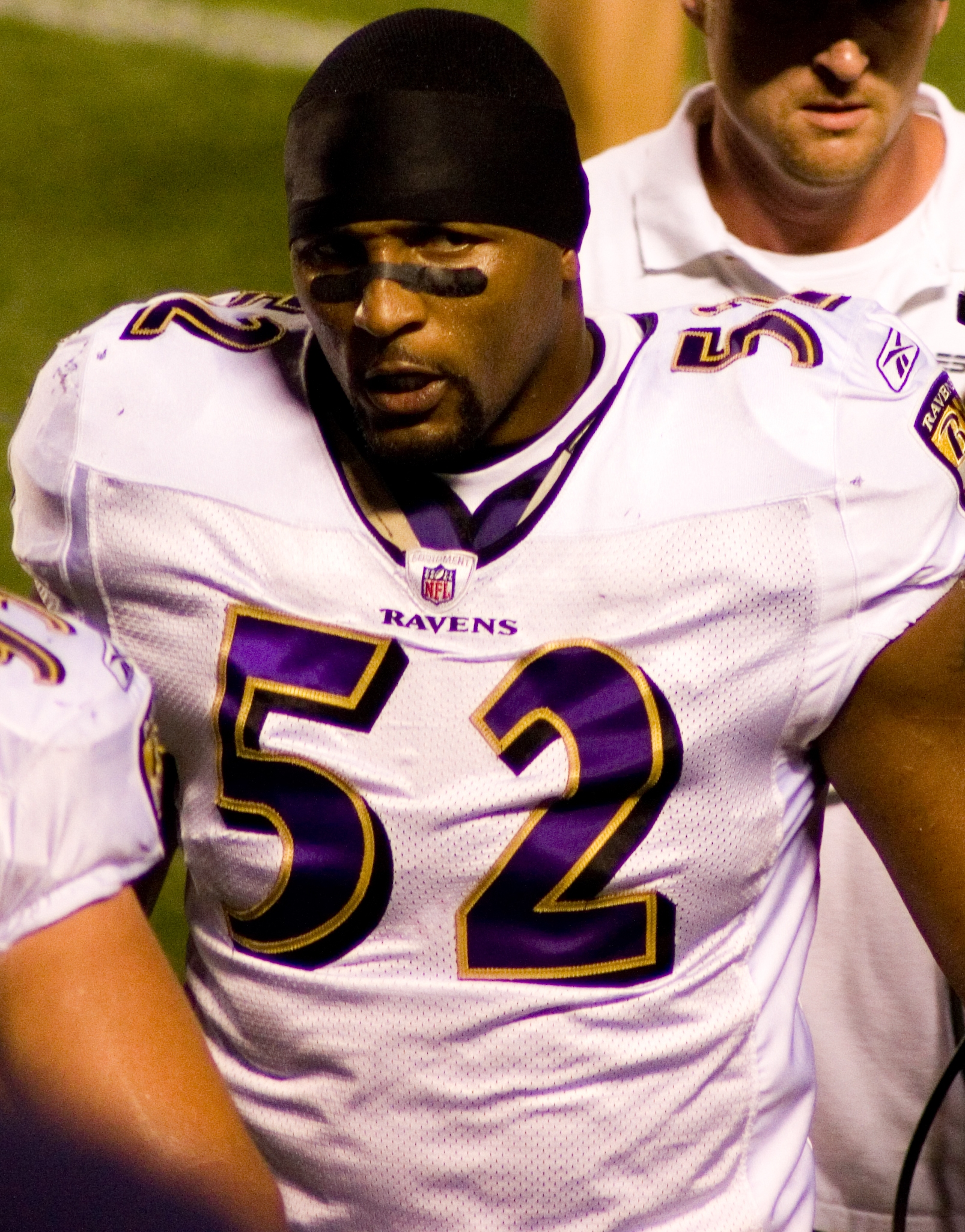
Ray Lewis during a 2008 regular season game.

In 2009, the Ravens won their first three games, then lost the next three, including a close match in Minnesota. The rest of the season was an uneven string of wins and losses, which included a home victory over Pittsburgh in overtime followed by a Monday Night loss in Green Bay. That game was notable for the number of penalties committed, costing a total of 310 yards, and almost tying with the record set by Tampa Bay and Seattle in 1976. Afterwards, the Ravens easily crushed the Lions and Bears, giving up less than ten points in both games. The next match was against the Steelers, where Baltimore lost a close one before beating the Raiders to end the season. With a record of 9–7, the team finished second in the division and gained another wild card. Moving into the playoffs, they overwhelmed the Patriots 33–14; nevertheless they did not reach the AFC Championship because they were routed 20–3 by the Colts in the Divisional Round a week later.

Baltimore managed to beat the Jets 10–9 on the 2010 opener, but then lost a poorly played game against Cincinnati the following week. The Ravens rebounded against the other two division teams, beating Cleveland 24–17 in Week 3 and then. The Ravens scored a fine win (31–17) at home against Denver in Week 5. The Ravens finished the season 12–4, second in the division due to a tiebreaker with Pittsburgh, and earning a wild card spot. Baltimore headed to Kansas City and defeated the Chiefs 30–7, but once again were knocked from the playoffs by Pittsburgh in a hard-fought game 31–24.

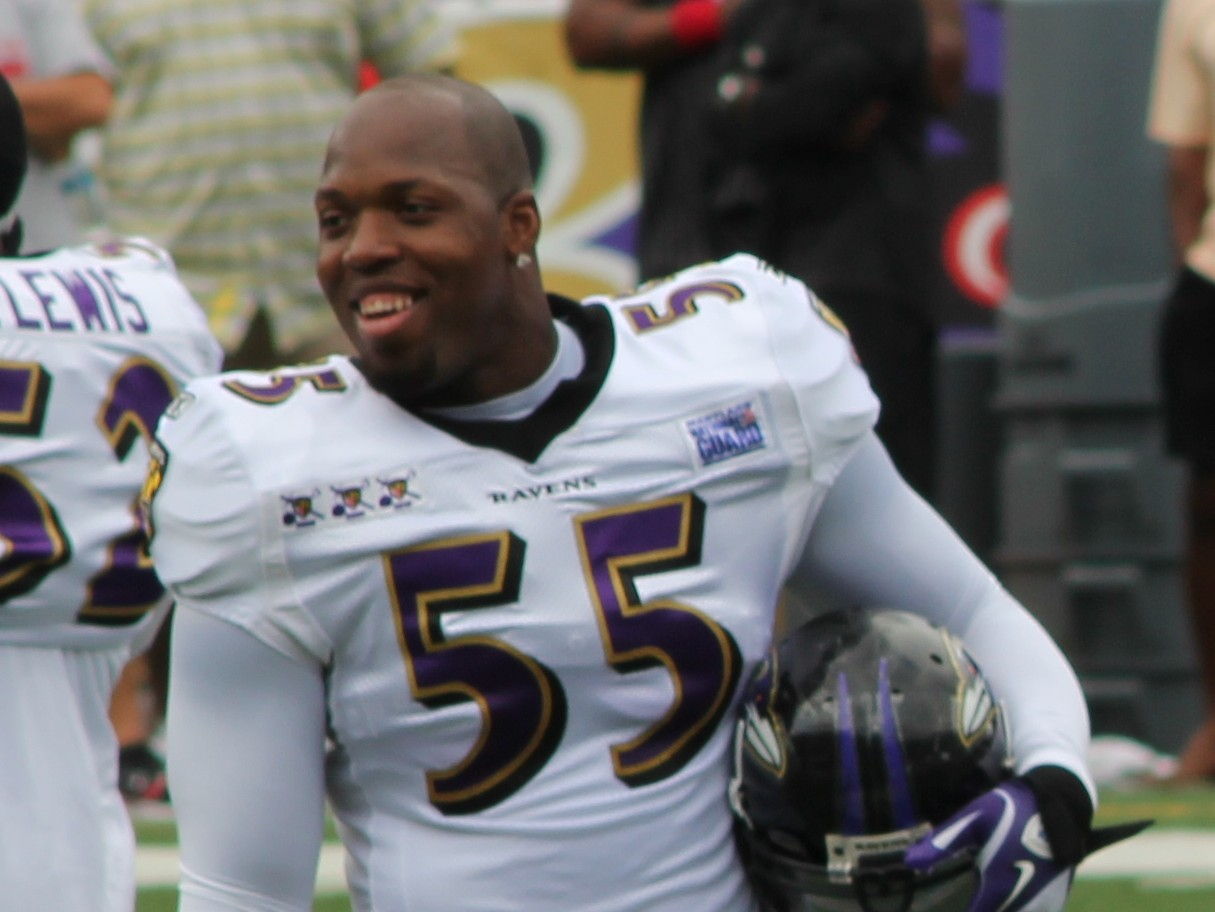
Terrell Suggs during practice in 2011.

The Ravens hosted their arch-enemy in Week 1 of the 2011 season. On a hot, humid day in M&T Bank Stadium, crowd noise and multiple Steelers mistakes allowed Baltimore to crush them with four touchdowns 35–7. The frustrated Pittsburgh players also committed several costly penalties. Thus, the Ravens had gained their first-ever victory over the Steelers with Ben Roethlisberger playing and avenged themselves of repeated regular and postseason losses in the series.

But in Week 2, the Ravens collapsed in Tennessee and lost 26–13. They rebounded by routing the Rams in Week 3 and then overpowering the Jets 34–17 in Week 4. Week 5, the Ravens had a bye week, following a game against the Texans. But in Week 7, Baltimore had a stunning MNF upset loss in Jacksonville as they were held to one touchdown in a 12–7 loss. Their final scoring drive failed as Joe Flacco threw an interception in the closing seconds of the game.

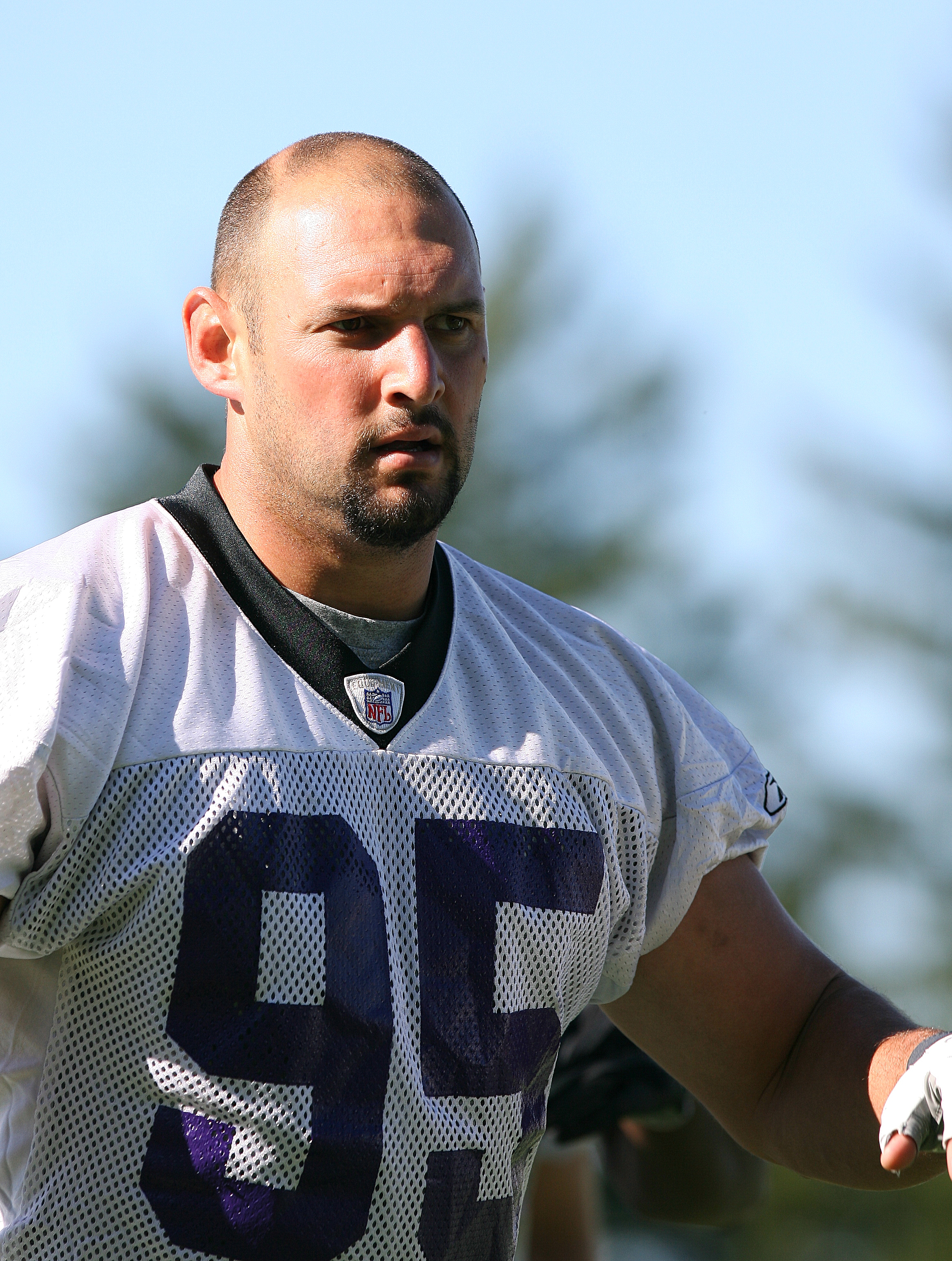
Jarret Johnson spent nine seasons with the Ravens from 2003 to 2011.

After beating the Cincinnati Bengals in Week 17 of the regular season, the Ravens advanced to the playoffs as the Number 2 seed in the AFC with a record of 12–4. They gained the distinction of AFC North Champions over Pittsburgh (12–4) due to a tie-breaker.

Ravens' Lee Evans was stripped of a 14-yard touchdown pass by the Patriots Sterling Moore with 22 seconds left and Ravens kicker Billy Cundiff pushed a 32-yard field goal attempt wide left on fourth down as the Patriots held on to beat the Ravens 23–20 during the AFC championship game and advance to Super Bowl XLVI.

==== 2012: Ray Lewis' final season and second Super Bowl victory ====
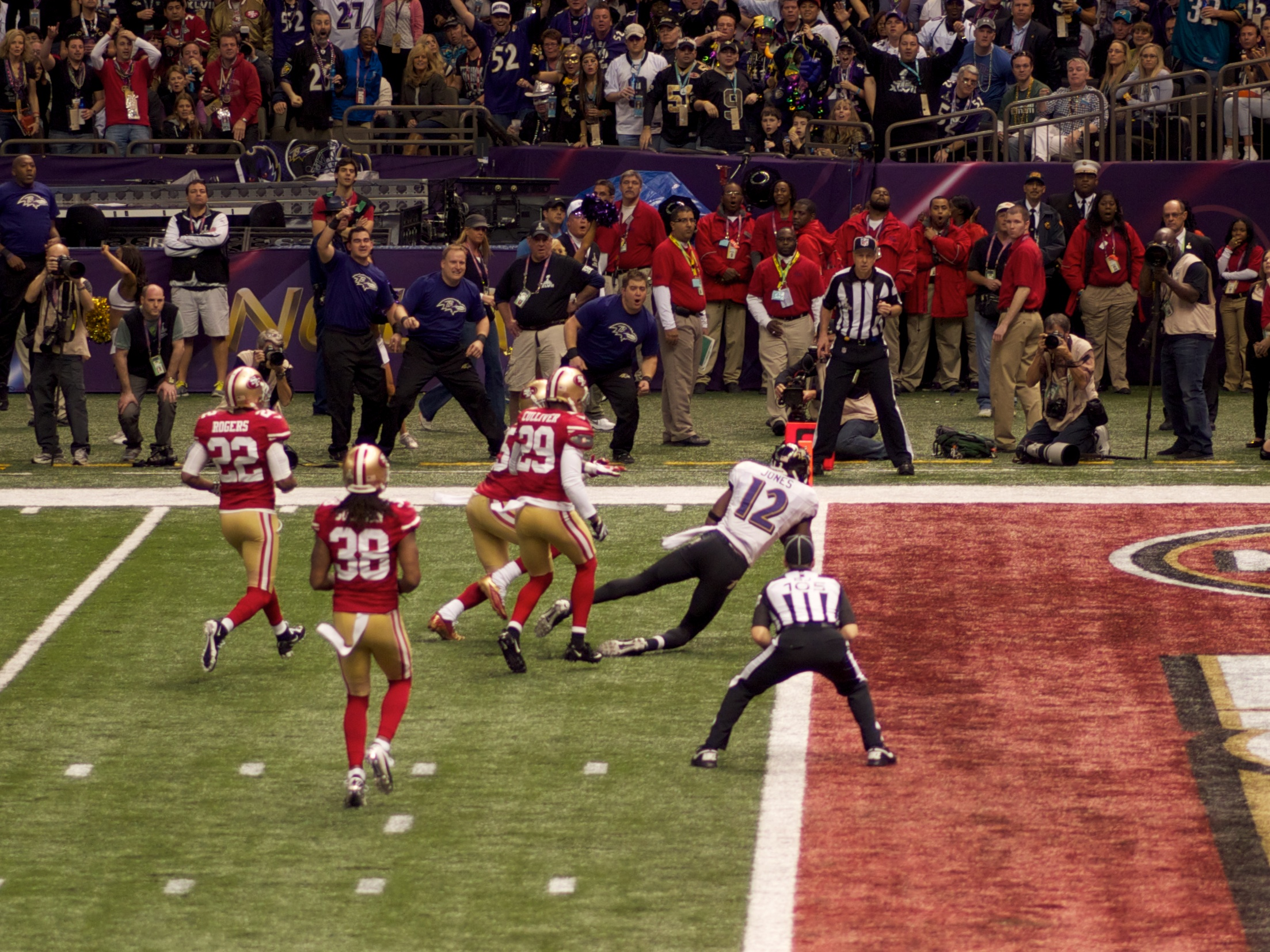
Jacoby Jones dives for the end zone during the second quarter of Super Bowl XLVII.

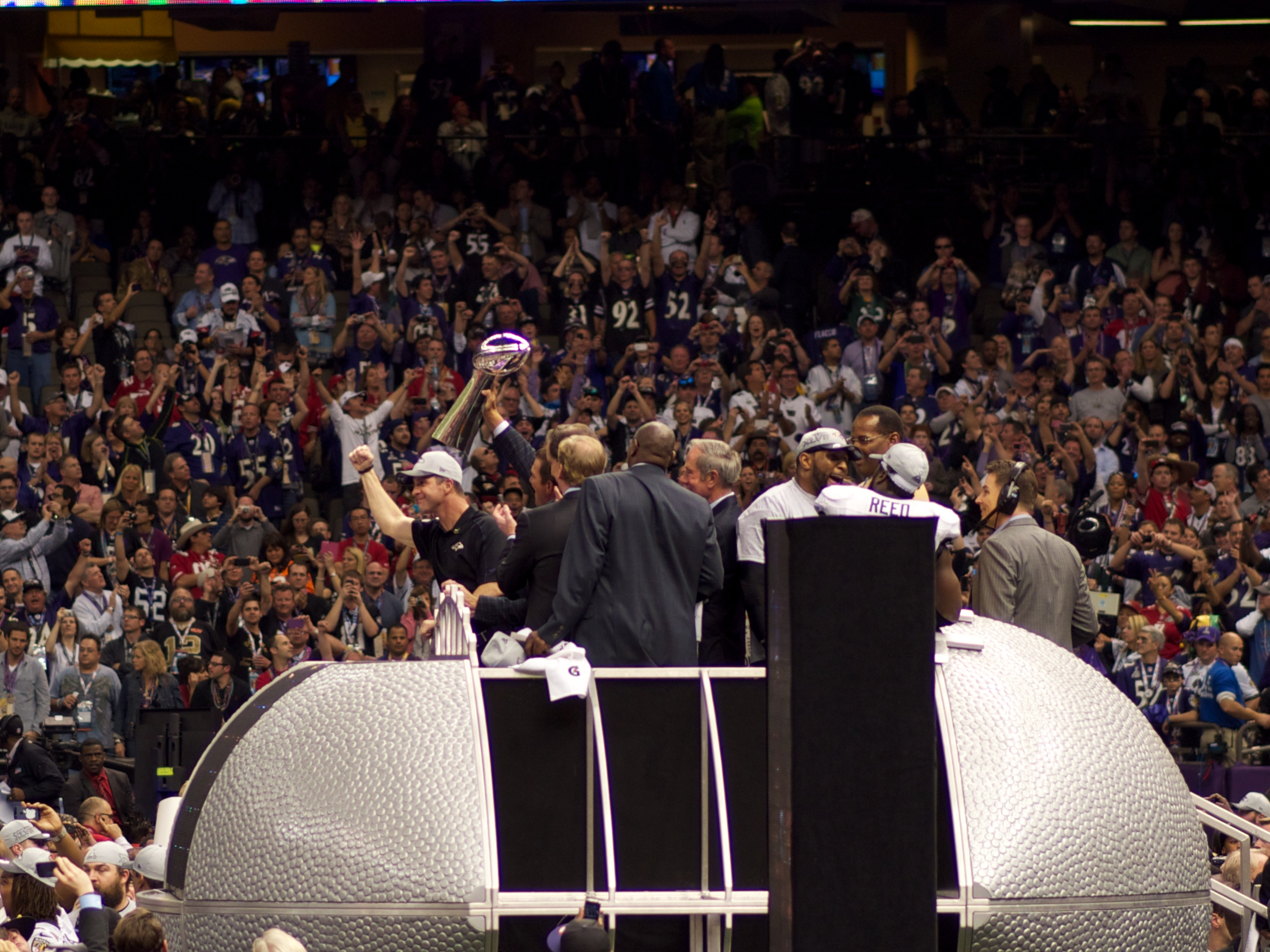
Lombardi trophy presentation following Super Bowl XLVII.

The Ravens' attempt to convert Joe Flacco into a pocket passer remained a work in progress as the 2012 season began. Terrell Suggs suffered a tendon injury during an off-season basketball game and was unable to play for at least several weeks. In the opener on September 10, Baltimore routed Cincinnati 44–13. After this easy win, the team headed to Philadelphia, but lost 24–23.

Returning home for a primetime rematch of the AFC Championship, another bizarre game ensued. New England picked apart the Baltimore defense (which was considerably weakened without Terrell Suggs and some other players lost over the offseason) for the first half. Trouble began early in the game when a streaker ran out onto the field and had to be tackled by security, and accelerated when, at 2:18 in the 4th quarter, the referees made a holding call on RG Marshal Yanda. Enraged fans repeatedly chanted an obscenity at this penalty. The Ravens finally drove downfield and on the last play of the game, Justin Tucker kicked a 27-yard field goal to win the game 31–30, capping off a second intense and controversially officiated game in a row for the Ravens.

The Ravens would win the AFC North with a 10–6 record, but finished 4th in the AFC playoff seeding, and thus had to play a wild card game. After defeating the Indianapolis Colts 24–9 at home (the final home game of Ray Lewis), the Ravens traveled to Denver to play against the top-seeded Broncos. In a very back-and-forth contest, the Ravens pulled out a 38–35 victory in two overtimes. They then won their 2nd AFC championship by coming back from a 13–7 halftime deficit to defeat the Patriots once again, 28–13.

The Ravens played the Super Bowl XLVII against the San Francisco 49ers. Baltimore built a 28–6 lead early in the third quarter before a partial power outage in the Superdome suspended play for 34 minutes (earning the game the added nickname of the Blackout Bowl). After play resumed, San Francisco scored 17 unanswered third-quarter points to cut the Ravens' lead, 28–23, and continued to chip away in the fourth quarter. With the Ravens leading late in the game, 34–29, the 49ers advanced to the Baltimore 7-yard line just before the two-minute warning but turned the ball over on downs. The Ravens then took an intentional safety in the waning moments of the game to preserve the victory. Baltimore quarterback Joe Flacco, who completed 22 of 33 passes for 287 yards and three touchdowns, was named Super Bowl MVP.

==== 2013–2018 ====
Coming off as the defending Super Bowl champions, this was the first year in franchise history for the team without Ray Lewis. The Ravens started out 3–2, and started the 2–0 Houston Texans 14-loss streak by shutting them 30–9 in Week 3. However, the Ravens lost their next 3 games, losing to the Green Bay Packers and Pittsburgh Steelers in last-minute field goals and were shut out in an attempt to tie the game against the Cleveland Browns 24–18.

After winning and losing their next game, the Ravens came out 4–6, but managed winning their next four games in dominating the Jets 19–3, a Steelers win 22–20 during Thanksgiving, a booming ending in Baltimore against the Vikings 29–26, and an 18–16 win at Detroit, including Justin Tucker's 61 yarder to win the game. The Ravens were 8–6, with the 6th seed, but after losing their next two games, and the San Diego Chargers winning their next two to clinch the 6th seed, the Ravens finished 8–8 and missed the playoffs for the first time since 2007.

On January 27, 2014, the Ravens hired former Houston Texans head coach Gary Kubiak to be their new offensive coordinator after Jim Caldwell accepted the new available head coaching job with the Detroit Lions. On February 15, 2014, star running back Ray Rice and his fiancée Janay Palmer were arrested and charged with assault after a physical altercation at Revel Casino in Atlantic City, New Jersey. Celebrity news website TMZ posted a video of Rice dragging Palmer's body out of an elevator after apparently knocking her out. For the incident, Rice was initially suspended for the first two games of the 2014 NFL season on July 25, 2014, which led to widespread criticism of the NFL.

In Week 1, on September 7, the Baltimore Ravens lost to the Cincinnati Bengals, 23–16. The next day, on September 8, 2014, TMZ released additional footage from an elevator camera showing Rice punching Palmer. The Baltimore Ravens terminated Rice's contract as a result, and was later indefinitely suspended by the NFL, although a judge later vacated this indefinite suspension. In Week 12, the Ravens traveled down for an interconference battle with the New Orleans Saints, which the Ravens won. In Week 16, the Ravens traveled to Houston to take on the Texans. In one of Flacco's worst performances, the offense sputtered against the Houston defense and Flacco threw three interceptions, falling to the Texans 25–13. With their playoff chances and season hanging in the balance, the Ravens took on the Browns in Week 17 at home. After three quarters had gone by and down 10–3, Joe Flacco led the Ravens on a comeback scoring 17 unanswered points, winning 20–10. With the win, and the Kansas City Chiefs defeating the San Diego Chargers, the Ravens clinched their sixth playoff berth in seven seasons.

In the wild card round, the Ravens won 30–17 against their divisional rivals, the Pittsburgh Steelers, at Heinz Field. In the next game in the Divisional round, the Ravens faced the New England Patriots. Despite a strong offensive effort and having a 14-point lead twice in the game, the Ravens were defeated by the Patriots 35–31, ending their season.

The 2015 season marked 20 seasons of the franchise's existence competing in the NFL, which the franchise recognized with a special badge being worn on their uniforms during the 2015 NFL season. The Ravens lost key players such as Joe Flacco, Justin Forsett, Terrell Suggs, Steve Smith Sr., and Eugene Monroe to injuries. Injuries and their inability to win close games early in the season led to the first losing season in the Harbaugh-Flacco era with a 5–11 mark. The 2016 Ravens finished 8–8, but failed to qualify the playoffs for the second straight year. They were eliminated from playoff contention after their Week 16 loss to their division rivals, the Steelers. This was the first time the Ravens missed the playoffs in consecutive seasons since 2004–2005, as well as the first in the Harbaugh/Flacco era.

During the 2017 season, the Ravens improved upon their 8–8 record from 2016 by one win, finishing the season 9–7 and missing the playoffs for the third year in a row. This marked the first time the Ravens failed to make the playoffs in three straight seasons since the team's first three years of existence (1996–1998). The Ravens suffered a loss at home to the Cincinnati Bengals in the final game of the season that prevented them from earning a playoff berth.

=== John Harbaugh/Lamar Jackson era (2018–2025) ===
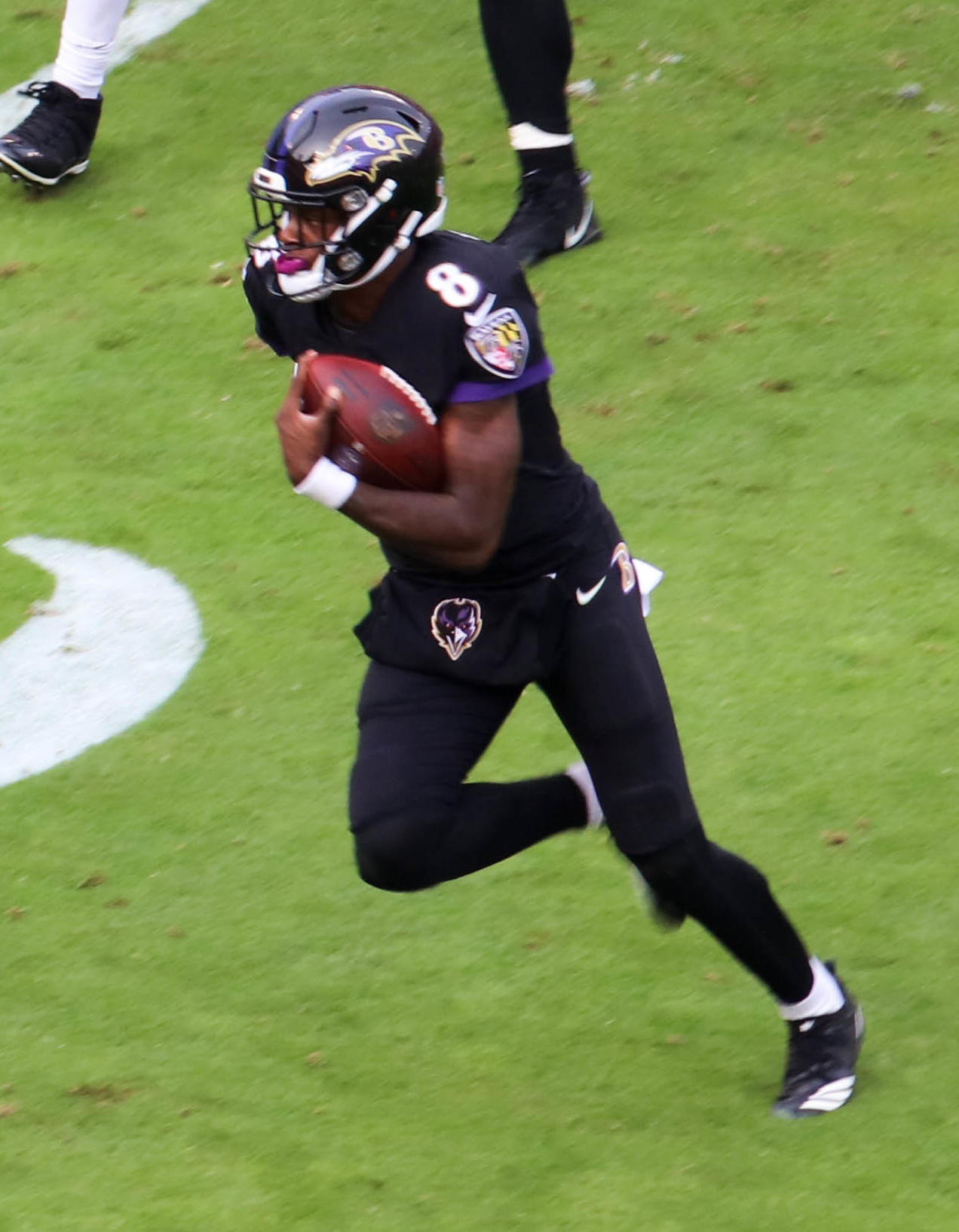
Jackson in 2018

The Ravens drafted quarterback Lamar Jackson with the 32nd pick in the 2018 draft. After the team started the season with a 4–5 record, Jackson took over as the starting QB in Week 11 when Joe Flacco was sidelined with a hip injury. The team won six of its next seven games, finishing the 2018 season with a 10–6 record and winning the AFC North, giving them their first playoff appearance since 2014 and their first division title since 2012. The Ravens lost to the Los Angeles Chargers in the Wild Card round with Jackson at quarterback, making him the youngest QB in NFL history to start a playoff game. At the conclusion of the season, Ozzie Newsome stepped down as the team's general manager. He was replaced by longtime assistant Eric DeCosta.

On March 13, 2019, the Ravens traded Joe Flacco to the Denver Broncos in exchange for a fourth-round pick in the 2019 NFL draft. That season, Lamar Jackson led the Ravens to a franchise-best 14–2 record, including a 12-game winning streak to finish the regular season. On December 22, they clinched homefield advantage for the first time in franchise history following a win over the Cleveland Browns. On December 8, Jackson became only the second player in NFL history to rush for over 1,000 yards from the quarterback position. Four days later, Jackson broke Michael Vick's single season quarterback rushing record of 1,037 yards. Thirteen Ravens were selected to the 2019 Pro Bowl, matching the all-time NFL record.

The Ravens finished the 2019 regular season with 3,296 rushing yards, the most rushing yards by any team in NFL history during a season and they became the first team in NFL history to average at least 200 passing yards and 200 rushing yards per game in the same season.

Despite earning the number one seed in the playoffs, the Ravens were eliminated by the 6th seed Tennessee Titans in the Divisional Round of the playoffs, 28–12. Lamar Jackson was unanimously voted AP NFL MVP, becoming only the second player in NFL history to do so, after Tom Brady in 2010.

In 2020, the Ravens went 6–5 in their first 11 games, but rebounded and finished the season 11–5, taking second place in the AFC North and earning a Wild Card playoff berth with the fifth seed. They also led the NFL in rushing yards for the second year in a row during the regular season, with 3,071 yards. In the Wild Card round, they defeated the fourth-seeded Tennessee Titans in Nashville, 20–13. In the Divisional Round, they fell to the second seed Buffalo Bills, 17–3.

In 2021, the Ravens claimed the record of consecutive preseason wins with 20, overtaking Vince Lombardi's Green Bay Packers record. In Week 3 of the 2021 season against the Detroit Lions, Justin Tucker put his name in the NFL record books by kicking the longest field goal in the history of the National Football League, 66 yards, which also was the field goal that won the game and 5 yards longer than his previous career long of 61 yards that was also kicked in Detroit. The following week, the Ravens tied the NFL record of consecutive 100 yard rushing games by a team with 43 in a win over the Denver Broncos, equaling the 1974 to '77 Pittsburgh Steelers record. The team reached an 8–3 record by Week 12, but ended the season on a six-game losing streak to finish 8–9, missing the playoffs and coming in last in the AFC North. Jackson sustained an ankle injury during the Week 14 loss to the Browns and did not appear in any subsequent games. In the 2022 season, the Ravens finished with a 10–7 record, which finished second in the AFC North. They lost in the Wild Card Round 24–17 to the Cincinnati Bengals.

In the 2023 season, the Ravens finished with a 13–4 record, which earned them the AFC North title and the #1 overall seed for the AFC playoffs. In the Divisional Round, they defeated the Houston Texans 34–10. In the AFC Championship, they lost to the Kansas City Chiefs 17–10.

Prior to the start of the 2024 season, the Ravens acquired All-Pro running back Derrick Henry and by week 6 became the first NFL team to post six straight games with at least 150 yards and one touchdown through the air and one on the ground. In the 2024 season, the Ravens finished with a 12–5 record and won the AFC North title. The Ravens defeated the Steelers 28–14 in the Wild Card Round before falling to the Bills 27–25 in the Divisional Round.

In the 2025 season, the Ravens finished with an 8–9 record. The AFC North title came down to the last week of the season, but a missed field goal by Tyler Loop saw the Steelers capture the division title. Subsequently, Harbaugh would be fired as head coach after 18 seasons.

=== Jesse Minter/Lamar Jackson era (2026–present) ===
The Ravens hired Jesse Minter as their 4th head coach in franchise history on January 22, 2026. Minter was previously the Los Angeles Chargers defensive coordinator, but had served on the Ravens staff from 2017 to 2020 as a defensive assistant.

== Championships ==
=== Super Bowl championships ===
| Season | Coach | Super Bowl | Location | Opponent | Score | Record |
|---|---|---|---|---|---|---|
| 2000 | Brian Billick | XXXV | Raymond James Stadium (Tampa) | New York Giants | 34–7 | 12–4 |
| 2012 | John Harbaugh | XLVII | Caesars Superdome (New Orleans) | San Francisco 49ers | 34–31 | 10–6 |
Total Super Bowls won: 2

=== AFC championships ===
| Season | Coach | Location | Opponent | Score |
|---|---|---|---|---|
| 2000 | Brian Billick | Network Associates Coliseum (Oakland) | Oakland Raiders | 16–3 |
| 2012 | John Harbaugh | Gillette Stadium (Foxborough) | New England Patriots | 28–13 |
Total AFC Championships won: 2

=== Division championships ===
| Year | Coach | Record |
|---|---|---|
| 2003 | Brian Billick | 10–6 |
| 2006 | Brian Billick | 13–3 |
| 2011 | John Harbaugh | 12–4 |
| 2012 | John Harbaugh | 10–6 |
| 2018 | John Harbaugh | 10–6 |
| 2019 | John Harbaugh | 14–2 |
| 2023 | John Harbaugh | 13–4 |
| 2024 | John Harbaugh | 12–5 |
Total division titles won: 8

== Rivalries ==
=== Divisional ===
==== Pittsburgh Steelers ====
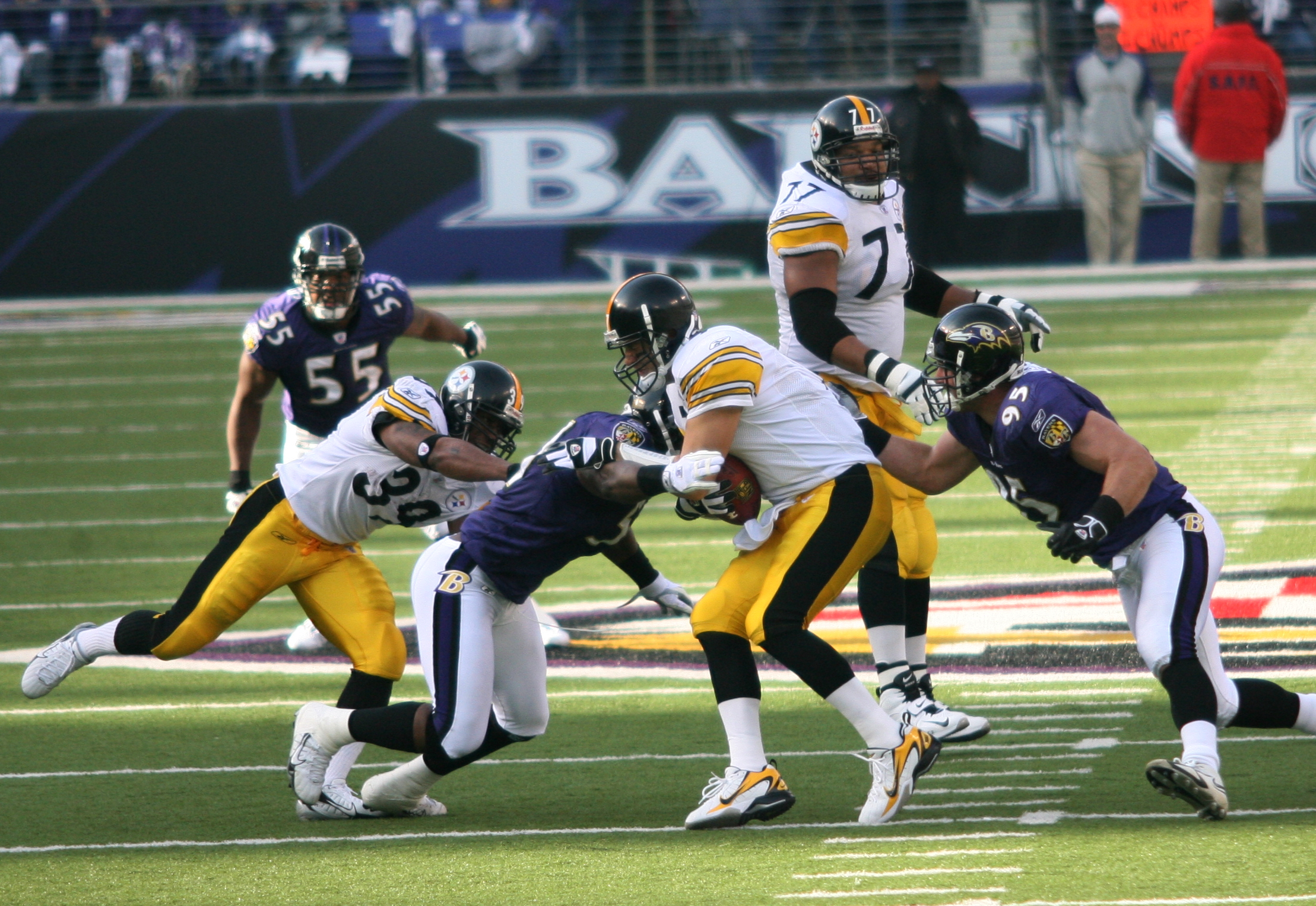
Steelers quarterback Ben Roethlisberger sacked by Bart Scott and Jarret Johnson

By far the team's biggest rival is the Pittsburgh Steelers. Pittsburgh and Baltimore are separated by a less-than-5-hour drive along Interstate 70. Both teams are known for their hard-hitting physical style of play. They play twice a year in the AFC North, and have met five times in the playoffs. Pittsburgh leads the all-time series, 33–25, and holds a 3–2 advantage in the five matchups in the postseason. Games between these two teams usually come down to the wire as most within the last 5 years have come down to under 4 points. The rivalry is considered one of the most significant and intense in the NFL today.

==== Cincinnati Bengals ====
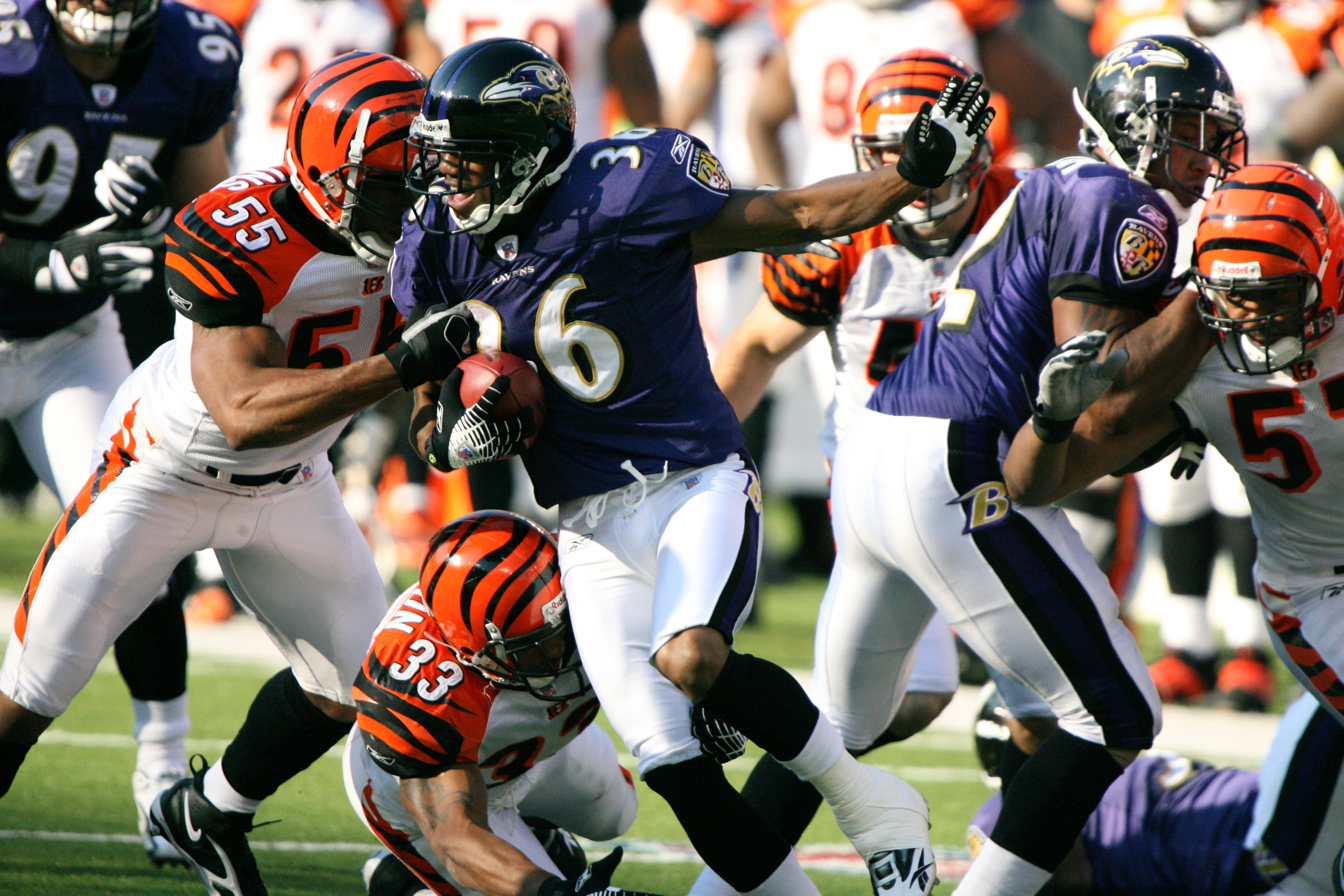
B. J. Sams (36) and Musa Smith (32) playing against the Cincinnati Bengals in November 2006.

The Ravens' rivalry with the Cincinnati Bengals began when the original Browns franchise moved to Baltimore to become the Ravens. Since then, the rivalry heated up when longtime Ravens defensive coordinator Marvin Lewis was hired as the head coach of the Bengals. The Ravens lead the all-time series 32–27 as of the 2024 season. The Bengals won the only playoff meeting in the 2022 AFC Wild Card round.

==== Cleveland Browns ====
The Browns–Ravens rivalry in the AFC North began when the Cleveland Browns resumed operations in 1999, after suspending operations for three seasons after the original Browns moved to Baltimore and became the Ravens. The rivalry between the Browns and Ravens was more directed at former Browns owner Art Modell, who orchestrated the move, than the team itself, and has, by most Ravens fans, been simply considered a divisional game. The rivalry has been largely one-sided, as the Ravens hold a 37–15 series lead as of the end of the 2024 season. The two teams have not met in the playoffs.

=== Conference ===
==== New England Patriots ====
The Ravens first met the New England Patriots in 1996, but the rivalry truly started in 2007 when the Ravens suffered a bitter 27–24 loss in the Patriots' quest for perfection. The rivalry began to escalate in 2009 when the Patriots beat the Ravens 27–21 in a game that involved a confrontation between Patriots quarterback Tom Brady and Ravens linebacker Terrell Suggs. Both players would go on to take verbal shots at each other through the media after the game.

As of the 2023 season, the Patriots lead the overall series, 11–5. The two teams have split four postseason meetings, 2–2. The Ravens won the 2009 Wild Card Round, 33–14, and the 2012 AFC Championship game, 28–13. The Patriots won the 2011 AFC Championship Game 23–20 and the 2014 Divisional Round, 35–31.

==== Tennessee Titans ====
Reemerging in the late 2010s, the rivalry between the Ravens and Tennessee Titans actually started in the 1990s when both teams were in the AFC Central, with both teams having tough and bitter games. The Ravens gave the Titans their first ever loss at the new Adelphia Coliseum in the 2000 season and the Ravens eliminated Tennessee during the playoffs later on that season. Fans and analysts have noted an emerging rivalry between the Ravens and the Titans of the AFC South. While there is no known animosity between the cities of Baltimore and Nashville, games between their respective teams have become heated and included fiery verbal exchanges between coaches and players. In the five postseason matchups between the two teams, the road team has won every time to date. As of the 2023 season, the Ravens lead the all-time series 14–13.

==== Buffalo Bills ====
A new rivalry emerged with the Buffalo Bills in the 2020s, as the Ravens and Bills have often squared off for conference dominance since Lamar Jackson and Bills quarterback Josh Allen were drafted in 2018. The two quarterbacks are known for their similar dual-threat styles of play, and have led their teams to similar success, in addition to combining for three NFL MVP awards. Bills and Ravens fans have also sparred over game results as well as 2024 MVP award, as Ravens supporters argued that Jackson, who finished second in voting, should have won the award instead of Allen. Jackson leads Allen in regular season games 3–2, including helping Baltimore win in Buffalo's Ralph Wilson Stadium for the first time in Ravens team history in 2019, though Allen has won both postseason matchups. Prior to this, Baltimore and Buffalo played sporadically since the Ravens joined the league in 1996, with the Ravens holding a general advantage in the early portion of the series. The series is tied at 7–7, with Baltimore leading in regular series games 7–5 and Buffalo leading in postseason games 2–0.

=== Instate ===
==== Beltway Bowl: Washington Commanders ====
Though the two teams only play each other every four years, the Ravens have a minor geographic rivalry with the Washington Commanders, whose stadium is about 40 miles away. The Commanders particularly had long blocked the return of an NFL team to Baltimore since the Colts franchise moved to Indianapolis in 1984. Former owner Jack Kent Cooke had been accused in multiple instances of orchestrating any means to prevent the city from receiving a new franchise until the Cleveland Browns moved to Baltimore in 1996, prompting Cooke to put the Redskins' then-new stadium in Landover, Maryland. The two teams play each other annually during the preseason. As of August 2024, the Ravens lead the series 4–3.

== Logo controversy ==
The team's first helmet logo, used from 1996 through the 1999 Pro Bowl, featured raven wings outspread from a shield displaying a letter B framed by the word Ravens overhead and a cross bottony underneath. The US Fourth Circuit Court of Appeals affirmed a jury verdict that the logo infringed on a copyright retained by Frederick E. Bouchat, an amateur artist and security guard in Maryland, though he was not awarded a dollar amount for his claim.

Bouchat had submitted his design to the Maryland Stadium Authority by fax after learning that Baltimore was to acquire an NFL team. He was not credited for the design when the logo was announced. Bouchat sued the team, claiming to be the designer of the emblem; representatives of the team asserted that the image had been designed independently. The court ruled in favor of Bouchat, noting that team owner Modell had access to Bouchat's work. Bouchat's fax had gone to John Moag, the Maryland Stadium Authority chairman, whose office was located in the same building as Modell's. Bouchat ultimately was not awarded monetary compensation in the damages phase of the case.

The Baltimore Sun ran a poll showing three designs for new helmet logos. Fans participating in the poll expressed a preference for a raven's head in profile over other designs. Art Modell announced that he would honor this preference but still wanted a letter B to appear somewhere in the design. The new Ravens logo, introduced in 1999, featured a raven's head in profile with the letter B superimposed. The secondary logo is a shield that honors Baltimore's history of heraldry. Alternating Calvert and Crossland emblems (seen also in the flag of Maryland and the flag of Baltimore) are interlocked with stylized letters B and R.

== Uniforms ==
=== 1996–2025 ===
The original Ravens uniforms, with subtle changes, were worn during their first 30 seasons. Art Modell admitted to ESPN's Roy Firestone that the Ravens' colors, introduced in early 1996, were inspired by the Northwestern Wildcats 1995 dream season. Helmets are black with purple "talon" stripes rising from the facemask to the crown. Players normally wear purple jerseys at home and white jerseys on the road. In 1996 the team wore black pants with a single large white stripe for all games.

In 1997 the Ravens opted for a more classic NFL look with white pants sporting stripes in purple and black, along with the jerseys sporting a different font for the uniform numbers. The white pants were worn with both home and road jerseys. The road uniform (white pants with white jerseys) was worn by the Ravens in Super Bowl XXXV, at the end of the 2000 NFL season. This all-white combination was originally worn with black socks, but starting in 2021, the Ravens began wearing white hosiery with the all-white uniform.

In the 2002 season the Ravens began the practice of wearing white jerseys for the home opener that has a 1:00 kickoff. In recent seasons, the practice has come when the home game is played in week one. Since John Harbaugh became the head coach in 2008, the Ravens have also worn their white jerseys at home for preseason games.

In November 2004 the team introduced an alternate uniform design featuring black jerseys and solid black pants with black socks. The all-black uniform was first worn for a home game against the Cleveland Browns, entitled "Pitch Black" night, that resulted in a Ravens win. The uniform has since been worn for select prime time national game broadcasts and other games of significance.

The Ravens began wearing black pants again with the white jersey in 2008. On December 7, 2008, during a Sunday Night Football game against the Washington Redskins, the Ravens introduced a new combination of black jersey with white pants. It was believed to be due to the fact that John Harbaugh doesn't like the "blackout" look. However, on December 19, 2010, the Ravens wore their black jerseys and black pants in a 30–24 victory over the New Orleans Saints.

Since 2010, the Ravens have worn their black jerseys at least twice each season. From 2011 to 2013 and again in 2015, they wore the all blacks once and the black on white once. In 2014 and 2016, they wore all black both times they wore alternate uniforms. In 2017, they wore all black twice and black on white once (although the league is supposed to limit teams to wearing alternate jerseys a maximum of two times a season).

On December 5, 2010, the Ravens reverted to the black pants with the purple jerseys versus the Pittsburgh Steelers during NBC's Sunday Night Football telecast. The Ravens lost to the Steelers 13–10. They wore the same look again for their game against the Cleveland Browns on December 24, 2011, and they won, 20–14. They wore this combination a third time against the Houston Texans on January 15, 2012, in the AFC Divisional playoff. They won 20–13. They would again wear this combination on January 6, 2013, during the AFC Wild Card playoff and what turned out to be Ray Lewis' final home game, where they defeated the Indianapolis Colts 24–9.

From their inaugural season until 2006, the Ravens wore white cleats with their uniforms; they switched to black cleats in 2007. From the mid-2010s onward, the NFL relaxed its rules regarding primary cleat colors, and Ravens players began wearing customized cleats in either purple, black, gold or white.

On December 20, 2015, the team unexpectedly debuted gold pants for the first time, wearing them with their regular purple jerseys against the Kansas City Chiefs. Although gold is an official accent color of the Ravens, the pants got an overwhelmingly negative response on social media by both Ravens fans and fans of other NFL teams, with some comparisons being made to the rival Pittsburgh Steelers' pants, and mustard.

During the 2015 season, the NFL announced a jersey promotion called Color Rush in which teams would wear uniforms typically of one color head-to-toe during select primetime games. The promotion was used three times that season; all the games that featured them were on Thursday Night and had both teams wear them in each. The following season, the league released uniforms for all 32 teams and announced they would be worn during all Thursday Night games that year, as well as on Christmas. The Ravens had one Thursday Night game in 2016; they wore their all-purple Color Rush uniforms and won 28–7 over the division rival Cleveland Browns. They had one other Thursday night game the following season, in which they again wore the jerseys and won 40–0 over the Miami Dolphins. In their Christmas 2016 game against the Steelers, the Ravens wore their regular all-white uniforms while their rivals wore their Color Rush uniforms. Starting in 2024, the Ravens would wear alternate purple helmets with the Color Rush uniform, featuring a new front-facing Ravens logo as the helmet decals. The full set was rebranded as the "Purple Rising" uniforms.

On September 13, 2018, the Ravens debuted a new combination in a road game against the Cincinnati Bengals, wearing white jerseys with purple pants. The purple pants are similar to the ones used for Color Rush except that it has side stripes of black and white; the Color Rush purple pants have gold and white stripes. Then on October 21 against the New Orleans Saints, the Ravens paired their new purple pants with their regular purple uniforms. Black socks were originally worn with this combination, but on January 2, 2022, the Ravens wore purple socks with the regular all-purple combination against the Los Angeles Rams, essentially replicating their Color Rush uniforms but with minimal gold elements.

For the regular season finale against the Browns on December 30, the Ravens wore their black uniforms with purple pants. The Ravens wore this combination again October 11, 2021, against the Indianapolis Colts on Monday Night Football in a 31–25 overtime win.

=== 2026–present ===
On April 16, 2026, the Ravens unveiled a new set of uniforms. The shade of purple was changed to midnight purple, which the team describes as a shade that "radiates in the light and reveals darkness when it fades". Drop shadows were eliminated from the numbers, as are the gold accents on the midnight purple, white and black uniforms. The white uniform now featured the city name atop the number. The shield logo on both the alternate black and "Purple Rising" uniforms were also recolored to match their respective color schemes. Three sets of helmets will be used. The primary gloss black helmet and the alternate matte purple helmet feature the primary Ravens logo; while the latter is mainly worn with the "Purple Rising" uniform, it can also be worn with the primary purple or white uniforms. The alternate matte black uniform, worn exclusively with the all-black alternate uniform, features the recolored front-facing Ravens logo with red eyes.

== Marching band ==
The team marching band is called Baltimore's Marching Ravens. They began as the Colts' marching band and have operated continuously from September 7, 1947, to the present. They helped campaign for football to return to Baltimore after the Colts moved. Because they stayed in Baltimore after the Colts left, the band is nicknamed "the band that would not die" and were the subject of an episode of ESPN's 30 for 30. The Washington Commanders are the only other NFL team that currently has a marching band.

== Players of note ==
=== Current roster ===
Baltimore Ravens roster
| **Quarterbacks (QB)**: 11 Jacoby Brissett; 12 Joe Fagnano; 18 Kedon Slovis; **Running backs (RB)**: 26 Rasheen Ali; 22 Derrick Henry; 43 Justice Hill; **Wide receivers (WR)**: 7 Rashod Bateman; 4 Zay Flowers; 6 Ja'Kobi Lane; 13 Elijah Sarratt; 81 Devontez Walker; 10 LaJohntay Wester RS; **Tight ends (TE)**: 89 Mark Andrews; 85 Josh Cuevas; 88 Matthew Hibner | **Offensive linemen (OL)**: 62 Chuma Edoga T; 71 Vega Ioane G; 51 Emery Jones Jr. G/T; 58 Ryan Neuzil C; 64 Cam Jurgens C; 70 Roger Rosengarten T; 74 John Simpson G; 79 Ronnie Stanley T; 76 Carson Vinson T; **Defensive linemen (DL)**: 93 Calais Campbell; 94 John Jenkins; 98 Travis Jones; 92 Nnamdi Madubuike; 90 Aeneas Peebles; 96 Broderick Washington | **Linebackers (LB)**: 40 Teddye Buchanan ILB; 97 Ethan Burke OLB; 15 Mike Green OLB; 91 Trey Hendrickson OLB; 49 Jay Higgins ILB; 32 Trenton Simpson ILB; 0 Roquan Smith ILB; 9 Zion Young OLB; **Defensive backs (DB)**: 3 Chidobe Awuzie CB; 14 Kyle Hamilton S; 21 Jaylinn Hawkins S; 44 Marlon Humphrey CB; 39 Keondre Jackson S; 38 Keyon Martin CB; 29 Chandler Rivers CB; 24 Malaki Starks S; 27 T. J. Tampa CB; 25 K'Von Wallace S; 2 Nate Wiggins CB; **Special teams (ST)**: 30 Ryan Eckley P; 35 Riley Patterson K; 46 Nick Moore LS | **Practice squad**: 68 A. J. Arcuri G; 99 Rayshaun Benny DT; 78 Gerad Christian-Lichtenhan T (PS/I); 60 Kyle Hergel C; 50 Adisa Isaac OLB; 36 Rayshawn Jenkins S; 48 Carl Jones Jr. ILB; 82 Gage Larvadain WR; 45 Harrison Mevis K; 17 Chris Moore WR; 65 David Olajiga DE (IPP); 28 Amani Oruwariye CB; 84 Ty Pezza TE; 56 Kaimon Rucker OLB; 47 Lucas Scott FB; 87 Nick Vannett TE; 34 Lardarius Webb Jr. CB; **Reserve**: 54 Jovaughn Gwyn C (IR); 5 Tyler Huntley QB (IR); 8 Lamar Jackson QB (IR); 31 Bilhal Kone CB (IR/DFR); 33 Tyler Loop K (IR); 63 Danny Pinter C (IR); 77 Ethan Pocic C (IR); 23 Adam Randall RB (IR/DFR); 41 Jahquez Robinson S (IR); 95 Tavius Robinson OLB (IR); 80 Durham Smythe TE (IR); 11 Skylar Thompson QB (IR) 52 active, 15 practice squad (2 IPP), 12 reserve As of November 16, 2026. Rookies in italics.; Roster; Depth chart; Transactions |

=== Pro Football Hall of Fame ===
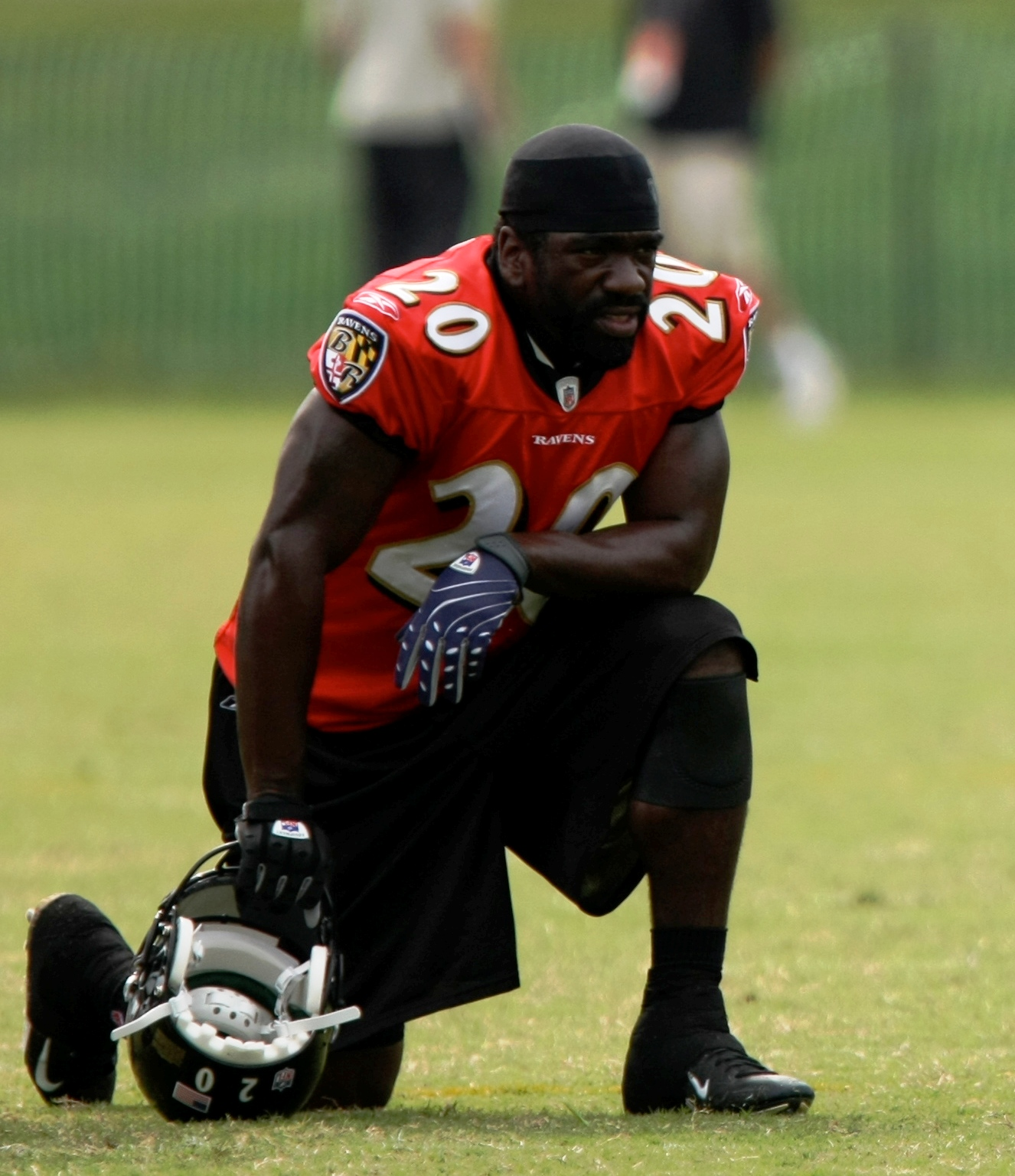
S Ed Reed, Hall of Famer (2002–2012)

Note: The following lists inductees of the Hall of Fame who spent portions of their careers with the Ravens. Bold number indicates player inducted primarily for their contributions to the franchise. For other Hall of Famers, players whose numbers were retired, and players who played for the Baltimore Colts, see Indianapolis Colts. For Cleveland Browns players, including those in the Hall of Fame and those whose numbers were retired, see Cleveland Browns.

Baltimore Ravens Hall of Famers
Players
| No. | Name | Position | Tenure | Inducted | Notes |
|---|---|---|---|---|---|
| 26 | Rod Woodson | S | 1998–2001 | 2009 | Super Bowl XXXV Champion |
| 82 | Shannon Sharpe | TE | 2000–2001 | 2011 | Super Bowl XXXV Champion |
| 37 | Deion Sanders | CB | 2004–2005 | 2011 | |
| **75** | **Jonathan Ogden** | OT | 1996–2007 | 2013 | Super Bowl XXXV Champion |
| **52** | **Ray Lewis** | LB | 1996–2012 | 2018 | Super Bowl XXXV (MVP) and XLVII Champion |
| **20** | **Ed Reed** | S | 2002–2012 | 2019 | Super Bowl XLVII Champion |
| 14 | Devin Hester | RS | 2016 | 2024 | |

=== Retired numbers ===
The Ravens do not have officially retired numbers. However, the number 19 is not issued out of respect for Baltimore Colts quarterback Johnny Unitas, except for quarterback Scott Mitchell in his lone season in Baltimore in 1999 with Unitas' permission. In addition, numbers 75, 52, 20, 55, and 73 in honor of Jonathan Ogden, Ray Lewis, Ed Reed, Terrell Suggs, and Marshal Yanda respectively, have not been issued since those players' retirements from football.

=== Ring of Honor ===
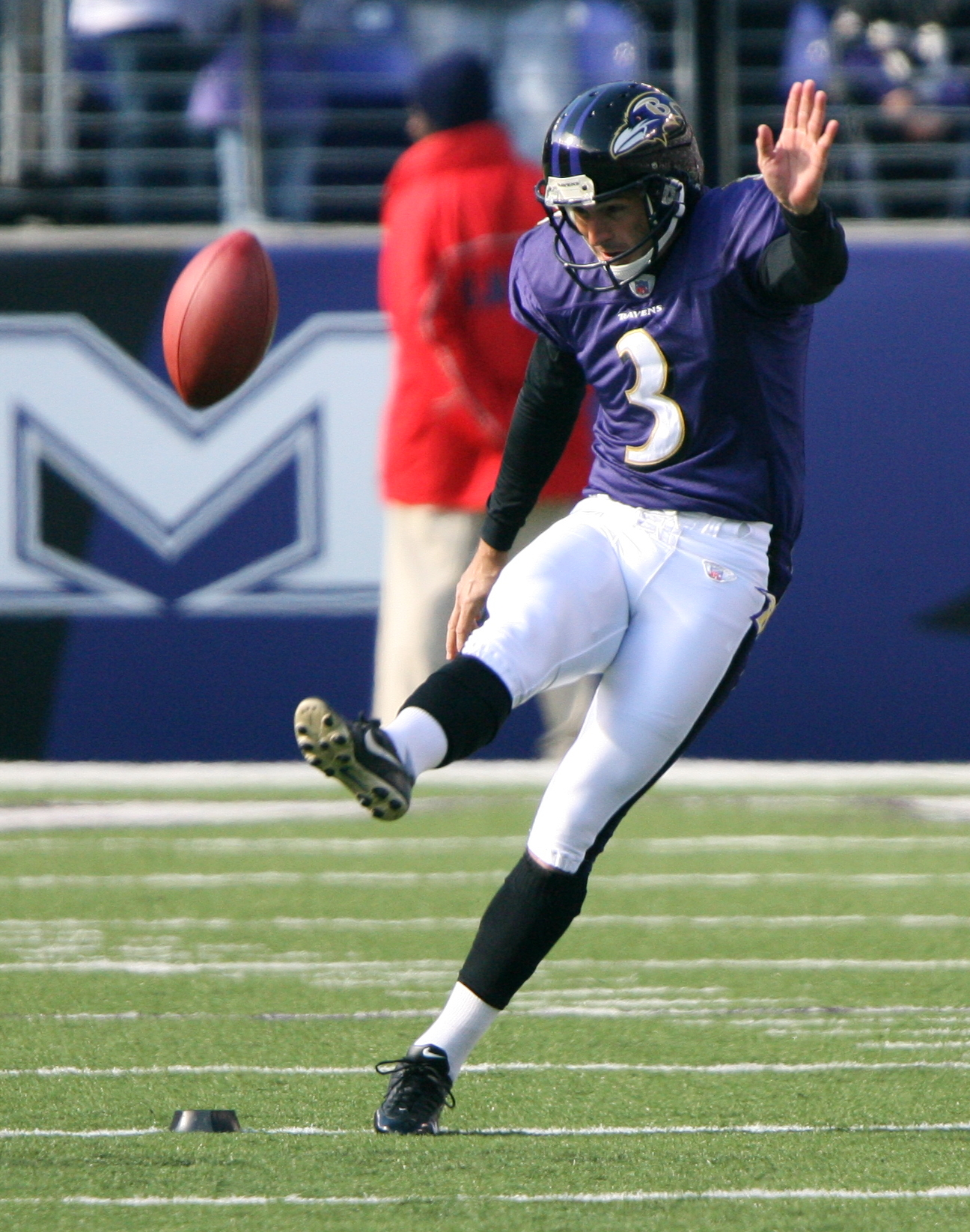
Ring of Honor member Matt Stover

The Ravens have a "Ring of Honor" which is on permanent display encircling the field of M&T Bank Stadium. The ring currently honors 20 members, including eight former members of the Baltimore Colts.

Key/Legend

| Pro Football Hall of Fame finalist |
| Inducted or Enshrined in the Pro Football Hall of Fame |
**Bold** numbers indicate jersey numbers unofficially retired

**Baltimore Ravens Ring of Honor members**
| # | **Inductee** | **Position(s)** | **Seasons in Baltimore** | **Date of Induction** | **Achievements in Baltimore** |
| 21 | Earnest Byner | RB, coach | 1996–2003 (8) | November 26, 2000 | The "tie between two cities" |
| **19** | Johnny Unitas | QB | 1956–1972 (17) | October 20, 2002 | 10 Pro Bowl selections, 7 All-Pro selections, 4× NFL MVP |
| 24 | Lenny Moore | HB | 1956–1967 (12) | October 20, 2002 | 7 Pro Bowl selections, 7 All-Pro selections |
| 70 | Art Donovan | DT | 1953–1961 (9) | October 20, 2002 | 5 Pro Bowl selections, 4 All-Pro selections |
| 77 | Jim Parker | OT | 1957–1967 (11) | October 20, 2002 | 8 Pro Bowl selections, 10 All-Pro selections |
| 82 | Raymond Berry | WR | 1955–1967 (13) | October 20, 2002 | 6 Pro Bowl selections, 5 All-Pro selections |
| 83 | Ted Hendricks | OLB | 1969–1973 (5) | October 20, 2002 | 3 Pro Bowl selections, 3 All-Pro selections |
| 88 | John Mackey | TE | 1963–1971 (9) | October 20, 2002 | 5 Pro Bowl selections, 3 All-Pro selections |
| 89 | Gino Marchetti | DE | 1953–1966 (14) | October 20, 2002 | 11 Pro Bowl selections, 10 All-Pro selections |
| — | Art Modell | Principal owner | 1996–2003 (8) | January 3, 2004 | Returned the NFL to Baltimore |
| 99 | Michael McCrary | DE | 1997–2002 (6) | October 4, 2004 | 2 Pro Bowl selections, 1 All-Pro selection |
| 58 | Peter Boulware | OLB | 1997–2005 (9) | November 5, 2006 | 4 Pro Bowl selections, 1 All-Pro selection, Defensive Rookie of the Year |
| **75** | Jonathan Ogden | OT | 1996–2007 (12) | October 26, 2008 | 11 Pro Bowl selections, 9 All-Pro selections |
| 3 | Matt Stover | K | 1996–2008 (13) | November 20, 2011 | 1 Pro Bowl selection, 2 All-Pro selections |
| 31 | Jamal Lewis | RB | 2000–2006 (7) | September 27, 2012 | 1 Pro Bowl selection, 1 All-Pro selection, Offensive Player of the Year, 2,000-yard club |
| **52** | Ray Lewis | ILB | 1996–2012 (17) | September 22, 2013 | 13 Pro Bowl selections, 10 All-Pro selections, 2× Defensive Player of Year, Super Bowl MVP |
| 86 | Todd Heap | TE | 2001–2010 (10) | September 28, 2014 | 2 Pro Bowl selections, 1 All-Pro selection |
| **20** | Ed Reed | FS | 2002–2012 (11) | November 22, 2015 | 9 Pro Bowl selections, 8 All-Pro selections, Defensive Player of Year |
| — | Brian Billick | Head coach | 1999–2007 (9) | September 29, 2019 | Super Bowl champion (XXXV), AFC champion, 2 AFC North championships, 4 Playoff Berths |
| 92 | Haloti Ngata | DE | 2006–2014 (9) | October 11, 2021 | 5 Pro Bowl selections, 5 All-Pro selections |
| **73** | Marshal Yanda | OG | 2007–2019 (13) | December 4, 2022 | 8 Pro Bowl selections, 7 All-Pro selections |
| **55** | Terrell Suggs | OLB | 2003–2018 (16) | October 22, 2023 | 7 Pro Bowl selections, 2 All-Pro selections, Defensive Player of Year, Defensive Rookie of the Year |

== First-round draft picks ==
The team's first draft was the 1996 NFL draft, where they selected UCLA offensive tackle Jonathan Ogden 4th overall and University of Miami linebacker Ray Lewis 24th overall. Both players won a Super Bowl with the team, earned numerous Pro Bowl and All-Pro selections, and are members of the Pro Football Hall of Fame. Along with their pick in the next year's draft, this was the highest first-round draft pick that the Ravens have had. In 1996, 2000, 2003, 2018, 2021 and 2022, the Ravens had two first-round draft picks. In 2004, 2010, and 2012, they had none. Two of their first-round picks have made at least ten Pro Bowls.

== Staff ==
=== Head coaches ===
- Ted Marchibroda (1996–1998)
- Brian Billick (1999–2007)
- John Harbaugh (2008–2025)
- Jesse Minter (2026–present)

=== Current staff ===
Baltimore Ravens staff
| Front office: Owner – Steve Bisciotti; President – Sashi Brown; Executive vice president/general manager – Eric DeCosta; Executive vice president – Ozzie Newsome; Vice president of football operations – Nick Matteo; Vice president of player personnel – George Kokinis; Vice president of football science – David McDonald; Director of player personnel – Mark Azevedo; Assistant director of player personnel – Andrew Raphael; Assistant director of player personnel – Bobby Vega; Director of college scouting – Joey Cleary; Director of pro personnel – Corey Frazier; Director of football innovation – Steve Clagett; Director of data and decision science – Derrick Yam; Assistant director of football administration - Sophia Cortese; Director of football systems – James Oncea; Senior director of football information – Megan McLaughlin; Consultant – Pat Moriarty; Chief of staff to the head coach – Christina Deruyter; Head coaches: Head coach – Jesse Minter; Offensive coaches: Offensive coordinator – Declan Doyle; Pass game coordinator – Marcus Brady; Quarterbacks – Israel Woolfork; Running backs – Eddie Faulkner; Wide receivers – Keary Colbert; Assistant wide receivers – Prentice Gill; Tight ends – Zack Grossi; Offensive line/run game coordinator – Dwayne Ledford; Assistant offensive line – Shawn Flaherty; Senior offensive assistant – Joe Lombardi; Offensive quality control – Patrick Kramer | Defensive coaches: Defensive coordinator – Anthony Weaver; Defensive line – Lou Esposito; Outside linebackers – Harland Bower; Inside linebackers – Tyler Santucci; Assistant linebackers – Matt O'Donnell; Pass game coordinator/secondary – Mike Mickens; Safeties – P. J. Volker; Assistant defensive backs – Miles Taylor; Football analyst – Rick Minter; Game management coordinator/defensive assistant – Charlie Gelman; Defensive quality control – Andrew Rogan; Special teams coaches: Special teams coordinator – Anthony Levine Sr.; Senior special teams coach – Randy Brown; Senior assistant special teams coach – Ben Kotwica; Coaching research: Coaching research engineer – Ben Davis; Strength and conditioning: Strength and conditioning coordinator – Scott Elliott; Assistant strength and conditioning – Kaelyn Buskey; Assistant strength and conditioning – Kevin Hartman; Strength and conditioning – Ron Shrift; Strength and conditioning – Anthony Watson; Applied sports science – Connor Gorny; Director of high performance – Sam Rosengarten; → Coaching staff → Front office → More NFL staffs |

== Broadcast media ==
| Preceded by St. Louis Rams | Super Bowl champions 2000 (XXXV) | Succeeded by New England Patriots |
| Preceded by New York Giants | Super Bowl champions 2012 (XLVII) | Succeeded by Seattle Seahawks |
