= William Dunavant =

American businessman (1932–2021)

William Dunavant Jr. (December 19, 1932 – September 11, 2021) was an American cotton industrialist.

== Biography ==
=== Early life ===
William Dunavant Jr. was born on December 19, 1932, to William and Dorothy Dunavant. He was educated first at The McCallie School in Chattanooga, then at Vanderbilt University, and received his bachelor's degree in Business Administration from Memphis State University. His maternal grandfather, T.J. White, was a cotton farmer from Tunica, Mississippi. His paternal grandfather, Colonel William P. Dunavant was in the railroad business and created one of the main cotton transporting railroads of the time. His father began working for T.J. White and Company at the age of 21. After White retired, the company was passed to Dunavant's father and renamed Dunavant Enterprises. When the senior Dunavant died in 1961, Dunavant inherited the company at the age of 29.

=== Career ===
When Dunavant took over the company in 1961, it handled around 100,000 bales of cotton a year, and ninety percent of their sales were in the United States. Today, the company sells over 4 million bales of cotton to more than 80 countries around the world. Dunavant Enterprises is on the Forbes 400 list of largest private companies (Forbes Ranking) and according to the Memphis Business Journal, it is the largest private company in Memphis.

According to a 1976 article in the Memphis Commercial Appeal, "Dunavant's company was one of the first to go into 'future contracting,' whereby a farmer agrees to a price before he plants. It's a risky venture speculating on future cotton prices but Dunavant prospered while others floundered." On March 13, 2007, Dunavant was inducted into the Futures Industry Association's Hall of Fame for his work in the cotton futures business.

After a successful career in the cotton industry, Dunavant stepped down as chief executive officer in 2005. Before his retirement Dunavant completed gross sale of $225 million to China, the second-largest cotton sale in history. Although Dunavant is no longer the CEO, he intends to remain chairman of the board.

Dunavant was active in Memphis-area philanthropy, working with institutions such as Rhodes College, Memphis University School, and Boy Scouts of America. Dunavant's love of tennis inspired him to build the Memphis Racquet Club in 1972. His aspirations for a professional football team resulted in him selling the Racquet Club in 1992. Dunavant was the owner of the Memphis Showboats of the United States Football League and a principal investor in the Memphis Hound Dogs, a proposed National Football League expansion team that was rejected in 1993.

=== Death ===
Dunavant died on September 11, 2021, at the age of 88.

== Sources ==
- "Coffee Break – Dunavant among 19 named to Futures hall." The Commercial Appeal. 10 March 2007: C1.
- Coleman, Laura. "Dunavant now king in cotton." The Commercial Appeal. 21 November 1987: A1..
- "Cotton Has Played Big Role In Life of Carnival Rulers." Press Semiter. 9 April 1973.
- "Dunavant steps aside." The Commercial Appeal. 2 August 2005: B4.
- "Dunavant Steps down in June – Innovative cotton merchant opened markets around globe." The Commercial Appeal. 6 January 2005: C1.
- "Dunavant to get humanitarian award." The Commercial Appeal. 20 August 1991: C5.
- Gatewood, Dallas. "Cotton Carnival King William Dunavant Jr." The Commercial Appeal. 8 April 1973
- Mark, Roy. "'Impetuous' Dunavant Plants his projects in High Cotton.'" The Commercial Appeal. 28 March 1976.
- Maum, Emmet. "Dunavant's 'Knack for Timing' Fosters International Success In Cotton Market." The Commercial Appeal. 15 March 1981.
- Porteous, Clark. "Cotton Dealing is 24-Hour Business for Dunavant." Press Semiter. 8 January 1977.
- Roberts, Jane. "From a cotton empire to a Montana ranch." The Commercial Appeal. 31 July 2005: A14.
- "Scouts will salute Dunavant." The Commercial Appeal. 26 Oct. 2005: C1.
- VanWyngarden, Bruce. "Q. and A. with William B. Dunavant." Memphis Flyer 19 Feb 2001 30 Sep 2007 http://www.memphisflyer.com/memphis/Content?oid=oid%3A6748
- "William Buchanan Dunavant, Jr." Marquis Who's Who TM. Marquis Who's Who, 2007. Reproduced in Biography Resource Center. Farmington hills, Mich.: Thomson Gale. 2007. http://galenet.galegroup.com/servlet/BioRC
