= Baltimore Bombers (proposed NFL team) =

Proposed National Football League expansion team

Logo

General information
- Founded: N/A
- Headquartered: Baltimore, Maryland, United States
- Colors: Blue, bronze

Team history
- Proposed expansion team, rejected by the NFL

League / conference affiliations
- National Football League

The Baltimore Bombers were a proposed National Football League expansion team located in Baltimore, Maryland. When the NFL was awarding expansion teams to two cities in 1993, Baltimore was among the cities vying for a team; the city had lost its previous team, the Colts, in a middle-of-the-night relocation nine years prior. In their proposal, the potential owners of the team had settled on the "Baltimore Bombers" as the team's nickname in honor of the B-26 Marauder, a World War II bomber designed by the Glenn L. Martin Company, and produced in Baltimore from 1941 to 1945. Leonard "Boogie" Weinglass, founder of the retailer Merry-Go-Round, was one of the potential owners of the Baltimore expansion team, as was Malcolm Glazer, who would later go on to purchase the Tampa Bay Buccaneers.

== Decision ==
Baltimore, as well as Memphis and St. Louis, was not awarded an expansion team, passed up in favor of Charlotte, North Carolina and Jacksonville, Florida. The Bombers proposal was believed to be near the bottom of the list of contenders, and league commissioner Paul Tagliabue opposed any expansion to Baltimore, saying "some towns are football towns and some towns are museum towns. I guess Baltimore is a museum town."

Shortly after the NFL's rejection, the Canadian Football League approved an expansion team for Baltimore; originally christened the Colts, legal action from the NFL compelled the team to stop using the "Colts" name. With a team that was eventually re-christened the Stallions, Baltimore became one of several U.S. markets introduced to Canadian football as part of the CFL's ill-fated expansion. Although they played only two seasons, the Stallions were, by far, the most successful CFL expansion team of the era, both on and off the field. Their success was a major factor in Cleveland Browns owner Art Modell's decision to relocate his NFL franchise to Baltimore, announcing his signing of a deal to move the team on November 6, 1995. Further legal action from the NFL eventually produced a settlement whereby Modell agreed to leave the Browns' name and colors in Cleveland in exchange for an expansion franchise in Baltimore that acquired the Browns' roster. Bombers was one of the names rejected by the team in the naming process, with city mayor Kurt L. Schmoke even writing a letter advising against the name in light of the Oklahoma City bombing and the Jaffa Road bus bombings in 1995 and 1996, respectively. The name of Marauders finished third in the final voting. The new NFL franchise would become the Baltimore Ravens while the Stallions ceased operations (although their ownership group was granted a new CFL franchise in Montreal and successfully re-signed much of the Stallions' roster).

== Proposed logo ==
The proposed main logo showed the silhouette of a "generic" World War II-era bomber (not the silhouette of the B-26 Marauder).
