= 1991 London Monarchs season =

World League of American Football team season

- General manager: Billy Hicks
- Head coach: Larry Kennan
- Home stadium: Wembley Stadium

Results
- Record: 9–1
- Division place: 1st European Division
- Playoffs: World Bowl '91 champions

The 1991 London Monarchs season was the inaugural season for the franchise in the newly created World League of American Football (WLAF). The team was led by head coach Larry Kennan and played its home games at Wembley Stadium in London, England. They finished the regular season in first place of the European Division with a league-best record of nine wins and one loss, which came in the last regular season game against the Barcelona Dragons. The unexpected loss eliminated the third European team, Frankfurt Galaxy, from the play-offs.

In the postseason, the Monarchs faced the New York/New Jersey Knights for a third time and a third win. After this semifinal was hosted away as Wembley was occupied with a soccer game, the Monarchs captured the first World League championship at Wembley with a shut-out win over the Barcelona Dragons in World Bowl '91.

== Staff ==
1991 London Monarchs staff
Front office: Chief Executive Officer – Jon Smith; General Manager – Billy Hicks; Director of Media Relations - Jack Gallagher; Director of Player Personnel – Mike Maccagnan; Head coaches: Head Coach/Quarterbacks – Larry Kennan; Offensive coaches: Offensive Coordinator/Offensive Line – George Warhop; Running Backs/Receivers – Hue Jackson; Offensive Assistant – Richard Davis	Defensive coaches: Defensive Coordinator/Defensive Backs – Ray Willsey; Defensive Line – Jim Washburn; Linebackers – Dennis Danielson

== Roster ==
1991 London Monarchs final roster
Quarterbacks: 5 Eric Dahlquist; 10 Stan Gelbaugh; 12 John Witkowski; Running backs: 20 Jeff Alexander; 30 J.J. Flannigan; 22 Judd Garrett; 32 David Smith; Wide receivers: 81 Dana Brinson; 86 Jon Horton; 80 Andre Riley; 85 Tony Sargent; Tight ends: 87 Pat Davis; 83 Dave Harbour LS	Offensive linemen: 60 Theo Adams T; 78 Damon Baldwin G; 70 Paul Berardelli G; 64 John Fruhmorgen C/G; 67 Steve Gabbard T; 68 Larry Jones G; 59 Doug Marrone C; 72 Todd Oberdorf T; Defensive linemen: 73 David Caldwell NT; 75 Roy Hart NT; 95 Mike Renna DE; 71 John Shannon DE; 90 Carnel Smith DE	Linebackers: 53 Marlon Brown OLB; 52 Russell Foster OLB; 94 Danny Lockett OLB; 55 Virgil Robertson ILB; 51 Ken Sale ILB; 54 James Singletary OLB; 56 Rickey Williams ILB; Defensive backs: 31 Danny Crossman SS; 33 Dedrick Dodge FS; 27 Corris Ervin CB; 25 Howard Feggins CB; 21 Irvin Smith CB; 42 Harvey Wilson FS/SS; Special teams: 4 Greg Horne P	Operation Discovery: 3 (England) Phil Alexander K; 44 (England) Trevor Carthy RB; 29 (England) Victor Ebubedike RB; 99 (England) Nigel Hoyte DE; Rookies in italics

== Schedule ==
Week	Date	Kickoff	Opponent	Result	Record	Venue	Attendance	Source
1	March 23	8:00 p.m.	at Frankfurt Galaxy	W 24–11	1–0	Waldstadion	23,169	
2	March 31	7:00 p.m.	New York/New Jersey Knights	W 22–18	2–0	Wembley Stadium	46,952	
3	April 6	8:00 p.m.	Orlando Thunder	W 35–12	3–0	Wembley Stadium	35,327	
4	April 15	7:00 p.m.	at Birmingham Fire	W 27–0	4–0	Legion Field	18,500	
5	April 20	7:00 p.m.	Montreal Machine	W 45–7	5–0	Wembley Stadium	35,294	
6	April 28	6:00 p.m.	Raleigh–Durham Skyhawks	W 35–10	6–0	Wembley Stadium	33,997	
7	May 6	7:00 p.m.	at San Antonio Riders	W 38–15	7–0	Alamo Stadium	12,328	
8	May 11	8:00 p.m.	at New York/New Jersey Knights	W 22–7	8–0	Giants Stadium	41,219	
9	May 18	5:00 p.m.	at Sacramento Surge	W 45–21	9–0	Hughes Stadium	21,409	
10	May 27	6:00 p.m.	Barcelona Dragons	L 17–20	9–1	Wembley Stadium	50,835	

Round	Date	Kickoff	Opponent	Result	Record	Venue	Attendance	Source
Semifinal	June 2	1:00 p.m.	at New York/New Jersey Knights	W 42–26	10–1	Giants Stadium	23,149	
World Bowl	June 9	5:30 p.m.	Barcelona Dragons	W 21–0	11–1	Wembley Stadium	61,108	

== Standings ==
European Division
Team	W	L	T	PCT	PF	PA	DIV	STK
London Monarchs	9	1	0	.900	310	121	1–1	L1
Barcelona Dragons	8	2	0	.800	206	126	1–1	W1
Frankfurt Galaxy	7	3	0	.700	155	139	1–1	L1

== Game summaries ==
=== Week 1: at Frankfurt Galaxy ===
Week One: London Monarchs at Frankfurt Galaxy – Game summary

Quarter	1	2	3	4	Total
London	0	7	17	0	24
Frankfurt	2	3	0	6	11

at Waldstadion, Frankfurt, Germany

- Date: Saturday, March 23
- Game time: 8:00 p.m. CET
- Game attendance: 23,169
- Referee: Stan Kemp

=== Week 2: vs New York/New Jersey Knights ===
Week Two: New York/New Jersey Knights at London Monarchs – Game summary

Quarter	1	2	3	4	Total
NY/NJ	7	0	0	11	18
London	0	3	19	0	22

at Wembley Stadium, Wembley, England

- Date: Sunday, March 31
- Game time: 7:00 p.m. BST
- Game attendance: 46,952

=== Week 3: vs Orlando Thunder ===
Week Three: Orlando Thunder at London Monarchs – Game summary

Quarter	1	2	3	4	Total
Orlando	3	0	3	6	12
London	7	7	7	14	35

at Wembley Stadium, Wembley, England

- Date: Saturday, April 6
- Game time: 8:00 p.m. BST
- Game attendance: 35,327
- Referee: Larry Nemmers

=== Week 4: at Birmingham Fire ===
Week Four: London Monarchs at Birmingham Fire – Game summary

Quarter	1	2	3	4	Total
London	7	3	0	17	27
Birmingham	0	0	0	0	0

at Legion Field, Birmingham, Alabama

- Date: Monday, April 15
- Game time: 7:00 p.m. CDT
- Game attendance: 18,512

=== Week 5: vs Montreal Machine ===
Week Five: Montreal Machine at London Monarchs – Game summary

Quarter	1	2	3	4	Total
Montreal	0	0	7	0	7
London	10	7	14	14	45

at Wembley Stadium, Wembley, England

- Date: Saturday, April 20
- Game time: 7:00 p.m. BST
- Game attendance: 35,294

=== Week 6: vs Raleigh-Durham Skyhawks ===
Week Six: Raleigh-Durham Skyhawks at London Monarchs – Game summary

Quarter	1	2	3	4	Total
Raleigh-Durham	3	7	0	0	10
London	7	7	14	7	35

at Wembley Stadium, Wembley, England

- Date: Sunday, April 28
- Game time: 6:00 p.m. BST
- Game attendance: 33,997

=== Week 7: at San Antonio Riders ===
Week Seven: London Monarchs at San Antonio Riders – Game summary

Quarter	1	2	3	4	Total
London	0	21	17	0	38
San Antonio	9	0	0	6	15

at Alamo Stadium, San Antonio, Texas

- Date: Monday, May 6
- Game time: 7:00 p.m. CDT
- Game attendance: 12,328

=== Week 8: at New York/New Jersey Knights ===
Week Eight: London Monarchs at New York/New Jersey Knights – Game summary

Quarter	1	2	3	4	Total
London	3	0	6	13	22
NY/NJ	0	0	0	7	7

at Giants Stadium, East Rutherford, New Jersey

- Date: Saturday, May 11
- Game time: 8:00 p.m. EDT
- Game attendance: 41,219

=== Week 9: at Sacramento Surge ===
Week Nine: London Monarchs at Sacramento Surge – Game summary

Quarter	1	2	3	4	Total
London	14	17	7	7	45
Sacramento	0	7	7	7	21

at Hughes Stadium, Sacramento, California

- Date: Saturday, May 18
- Game time: 5:00 p.m. PDT
- Game attendance: 21,409

=== Week 10: vs Barcelona Dragons ===
Week Ten: Barcelona Dragons at London Monarchs – Game summary

Quarter	1	2	3	4	Total
Barcelona	10	0	7	3	20
London	0	3	0	14	17

at Wembley Stadium, Wembley, England

- Date: Monday, May 27
- Game time: 6:00 p.m. BST
- Game attendance: 50,835

=== Semifinal: at New York/New Jersey Knights ===
Semifinal: London Monarchs at New York/New Jersey Knights – Game summary

Quarter	1	2	3	4	Total
London	0	14	14	14	42
NY/NJ	3	17	6	0	26

at Giants Stadium, East Rutherford, New Jersey

- Date: Sunday, June 2
- Game time: 8:00 p.m. EDT
- Game attendance: 23,149

=== World Bowl '91: vs Barcelona Dragons ===
World Bowl '91: Barcelona Dragons vs London Monarchs – Game summary

Quarter	1	2	3	4	Total
Barcelona	0	0	0	0	0
London	7	14	0	0	21

at Wembley Stadium, Wembley, England

- Date: Sunday, June 9
- Game time: 5:30 p.m. BST
- Game attendance: 61,108
- Referee: Bernie Kukar
