= Larry Kennan =

American football player and coach

Biographical details
- Born: June 13, 1944 (age 82); Pomona, California, U.S.

Playing career
- 1962–1965: La Verne
- Position: Quarterback

Coaching career (HC unless noted)
- 1966: La Verne (backfield)
- 1967–1968: Garden Grove HS (CA) (assistant)
- 1969–1971: Colorado (assistant)
- 1972: Arvada West HS (CO) (assistant)
- 1973–1975: UNLV (OC)
- 1976–1978: SMU (OC)
- 1979–1981: Lamar
- 1982: Los Angeles Raiders (QC)
- 1983–1987: Los Angeles Raiders (QB)
- 1988: Denver Broncos (WR)
- 1989–1990: Indianapolis Colts (OC)
- 1991: London Monarchs
- 1992–1994: Seattle Seahawks (OC/QB)
- 1995: New Orleans Saints (TE)
- 1996: Oakland Raiders (QB)
- 1997: New England Patriots (OC)
- 2012–2017: Incarnate Word

Administrative career (AD unless noted)
- 1998–2011: NFL Coaches Association (ED)

Head coaching record
- Overall: 33–63–3 (college); 11–1 (WLAF)
- Tournaments: 2–0 (WLAF)

Accomplishments and honors

Championships
- 1 World Bowl (1991)

Awards
- WLAF Coach of the Year (1991); Super Bowl champion (XVIII) quarterbacks coach

Lawrence W. Kennan (born June 13, 1944) is an American former football coach. Kennan was most recently the head football coach for the University of the Incarnate Word from 2012 to 2017. He was also the head coach at Lamar University from 1979 to 1981 and for the London Monarchs of the World League of American Football (WLAF) in 1991. Kennan served as the executive director of the NFL Coaches Association from 1998 until 2011.

== Coaching career ==
Kennan's coaching career began at his alma mater La Verne in 1966. After a two-year stint at Garden Grove High School, he resumed his collegiate coaching career at Colorado in 1969 and then served as the offensive coordinator at UNLV (1973–1975) and SMU (1976–1978). He was named head football coach at Lamar University in 1979, where he coached the Cardinals for three years.

Kennan joined the professional ranks in 1982 when Tom Flores named him quality control coach on his Los Angeles Raiders staff. The following year, he was promoted to quarterbacks coach and won a Super Bowl ring with them as quarterbacks coach of the Super Bowl XVIII winning team. He remained with the Raiders for six seasons, before joining the Denver Broncos as the wide receivers coach in 1988. In 1989, Kennan was named the offensive coordinator of the Indianapolis Colts.

After two seasons, he was named head coach of the London Monarchs of the World League of American Football. That year, he led the Monarchs to a 9–1 regular season record and captured the inaugural World Bowl title with a 21–0 victory over the Barcelona Dragons. He returned to the NFL in 1992 when he was named the offensive coordinator and quarterbacks coach of the Seattle Seahawks, where he remained through the 1994 season.

In 1995, he joined Jim E. Mora's staff in New Orleans, where he instructed the Saints tight ends for a year before re-joining the Raiders in 1996. After one season as Oakland's quarterbacks coach, Kennan was hired by Pete Carroll as offensive coordinator of the New England Patriots. After one year there, and now liking how he was being treated, he quit and moved to Washington, D.C., to serve as the first executive director of the NFL Coaches Association.

In December 2011, after 14 years out of coaching, Kennan succeeded Mike Santiago as the head football coach at the University of the Incarnate Word. On November 27, 2017, Kennan was dismissed as Incarnate Word's head football coach after finishing the 2017 campaign with a 1–10 record and a 1–7 mark in Southland Conference play.

== Head coaching record ==
=== College ===
Year	Team	Overall	Conference	Standing	Bowl/playoffs
Lamar Cardinals (Southland Conference) (1979–1981)
1979	Lamar	6–3–2	3–2	3rd	
1980	Lamar	3–8	1–4	5th	
1981	Lamar	4–6–1	1–3–1	5th	
Lamar:		13–17–3	5–9–1		
Incarnate Word Cardinals (Lone Star Conference) (2012)
2012	Incarnate Word	2–9	1–7	T–8th	
Incarnate Word Cardinals (NCAA Division I FCS independent) (2013)
2013	Incarnate Word	6–5			
Incarnate Word Cardinals (Southland Conference) (2014–2017)
2014	Incarnate Word	2–9	2–6	9th	
2015	Incarnate Word	6–5	5–4	4th	
2016	Incarnate Word	3–8	3–6	T–8th	
2017	Incarnate Word	1–10	1–7	9th	
Incarnate Word:		20–46	12–30		
Total:		33–63–3			

=== Professional ===
Year	Team	Overall	Conference	Standing	Bowl/playoffs
London Monarchs (World League of American Football) (1991)
1991	London Monarchs	11–1	1–1	1st (European)	W World Bowl '91
London Monarchs:		11–1			
Total:		11–1			
