= Jason Garrett =

American football player and coach (born 1966)

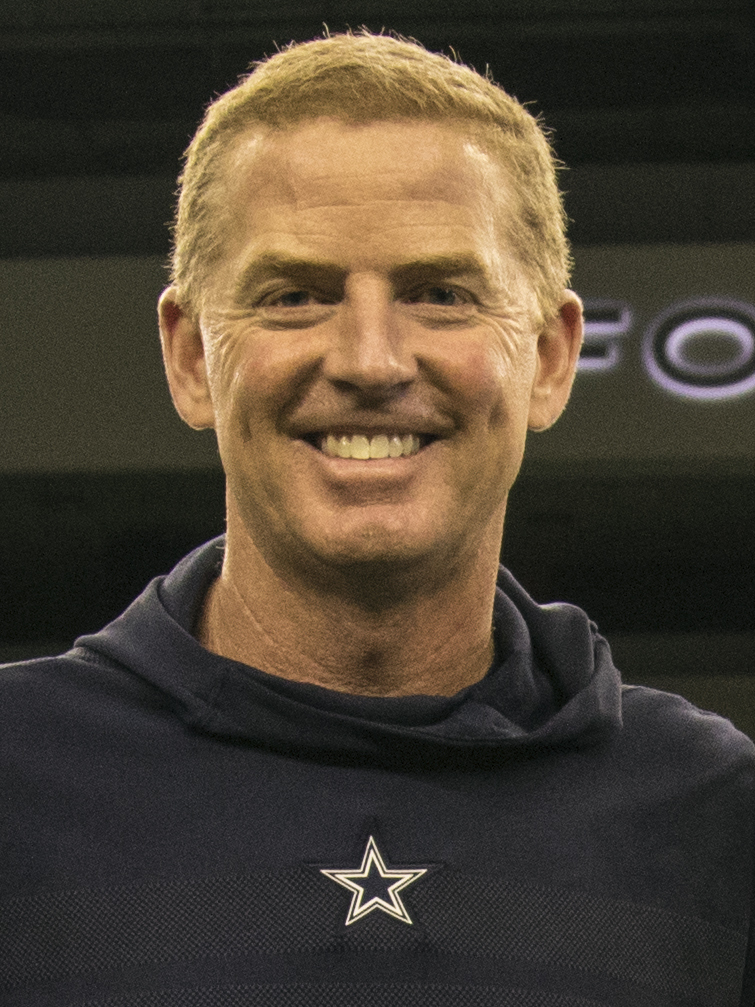
- Garrett with the Dallas Cowboys in 2019

No. 3, 4, 17
- Position: Quarterback

Personal information
- Born: March 28, 1966 (age 60); Abington, Pennsylvania, U.S.
- Listed height: 6 ft 0 in (1.83 m)
- Listed weight: 200 lb (91 kg)

Career information
- High school: University (Hunting Valley, Ohio)
- College: Princeton
- NFL draft: 1989: undrafted

Career history

Playing
- New Orleans Saints (1989–1990)*; San Antonio Riders (1991); Ottawa Rough Riders (1991); Dallas Cowboys (1992–1999); New York Giants (2000–2003); Tampa Bay Buccaneers (2004); Miami Dolphins (2004)
- * Offseason or practice squad member only

Coaching
- Miami Dolphins (2005–2006) Quarterbacks coach; Dallas Cowboys (2007–2010); Offensive coordinator (2007); Assistant head coach & offensive coordinator (2008–2010); Interim head coach (2010); Dallas Cowboys (2011–2019) Head coach; New York Giants (2020–2021) Offensive coordinator

Awards and highlights
- As player: 3× Super Bowl champion (XXVII, XXVIII, XXX); As coach: NFL Coach of the Year (2016); PFWA Assistant Coach of the Year (2007)

Career NFL statistics
- Passing attempts: 294
- Passing completions: 165
- Completion percentage: 56.1%
- TD–INT: 11–5
- Passing yards: 2,042
- Passer rating: 83.2
- Stats at Pro Football Reference

Head coaching record
- Regular season: 85–67 (.559)
- Postseason: 2–3 (.400)
- Career: 87–70 (.554)
- Coaching profile at Pro Football Reference

Jason Calvin Garrett (born March 28, 1966) is an American former professional football player and coach in the National Football League (NFL). He was most notably the head coach of the Dallas Cowboys from 2010 to 2019.

Garrett played college football for the Princeton Tigers and signed with the New Orleans Saints as an undrafted free agent in 1989. He also played for the San Antonio Riders, Ottawa Rough Riders, Cowboys (winning three Super Bowls as the backup quarterback to Troy Aikman), New York Giants, Tampa Bay Buccaneers, and Miami Dolphins. Garrett began his coaching career as the quarterbacks coach for the Dolphins before serving as the offensive coordinator and assistant head coach for the Cowboys.

In 2022, Garrett became a color commentator for NBC Sports. He provides regular commentary for NBC Sports' coverage of Notre Dame football, and is an alternate color commentator for the NFL on NBC. Garrett is also a studio analyst for NBC's NFL pregame show Football Night in America.

== Early life ==
Garrett was born on March 28, 1966, in Abington, Pennsylvania. He attended kindergarten through second grade at Holy Cross school in Rumson, New Jersey. Garrett went to prep school at University School in Hunting Valley, Ohio, and was a letterman in football, basketball, and baseball. As a senior, he won All-League honors as a quarterback and safety. Garrett graduated from University School in 1984.

== College career ==
Garrett was accepted to Princeton University, where he began as the starting quarterback of the freshman team, registering 64 completions on 116 attempts for 996 yards. Garrett transferred to Columbia University when his father, Jim, became the head coach in 1985. Following his father's resignation after Columbia's 0–10 1985 season, Garrett and his brothers (Judd and John) transferred to Princeton, although none played varsity in 1986 for different reasons (Jason was an ineligible transfer).

Garrett sat out the 1986 season because of the transfer rules while focusing on running the scout team, which included his brothers. The next year, as a junior, Garrett was named the starting quarterback. Although he piloted Princeton to a win against his former team, Columbia (a loss that gave Columbia the Division I record for straight losses, at 35), Garrett was also involved in a losing effort against them as a senior, snapping Columbia's by then 44-game losing streak. He received the Asa S. Bushnell Cup as the Ivy League Player of the Year. Garrett earned a degree in history in 1989, with a senior thesis on "The Revolt of the Black Athlete as Initiated by Harry Edwards".

Garrett finished his college career completing 366 of 550 passes (66.5%) for 4,274 yards and 20 touchdowns. At the time, he was ranked in the categories: lowest pass interception percentage (1.8% – school record), total yards of offense (4,555 – second in school history), total yards of offense in a season (2,485 – third in school history), most passing yards (4,274 – second in school history), most passing yards in a season (2,217 – fourth in school history), most completions (366 – second in school history), most completions in a season (204 – third in school history), most touchdown passes (20 – tied for fourth). Garrett continues to hold the Ivy League career record for completion percentage with 66.5% (366/550) and his 1988 percentage of 68.2% (204/299) stood as the league record until 2000, when Gavin Hoffman posted a 70.5% mark.

== Professional playing career ==
Pre-draft measurables
Height	Weight	40-yard dash	10-yard split	20-yard split	20-yard shuttle	Vertical jump
6 ft 0 1/2 in (1.84 m)	192 lb (87 kg)	4.85 s	1.64 s	2.86 s	4.06 s	29.5 in (0.75 m)
All values from NFL Combine

=== New Orleans Saints ===
Garrett was signed as an undrafted free agent by the New Orleans Saints after the 1989 NFL draft and was eventually signed to the practice squad. On September 3, 1990, he was waived by the Saints and spent most of the year working as a coaching assistant for Princeton.

=== San Antonio Riders ===
In 1991, Garrett started at quarterback for the San Antonio Riders of the World League of American Football, but he suffered a separated right shoulder in the season opener. Garrett returned to start the sixth and seventh games but was passed on the depth chart by Mike Johnson.

=== Ottawa Rough Riders ===
On June 4, 1991, Garrett was signed by the Ottawa Rough Riders of the Canadian Football League, but was released in August.

=== Dallas Cowboys ===
In 1992, with the support of his father, at the time a part of the Dallas Cowboys scouting department, Garrett was signed as a free agent. He was released on August 31 and later signed to the team's practice squad. In 1993, Garrett's preseason performances allowed him to make the team as the third-string quarterback behind Troy Aikman and Hugh Millen. Garrett eventually passed Millen on the depth chart. In the eighth game of the season after Aikman injured his left hamstring against the New York Giants in the third quarter, Garrett came in and led two touchdown drives while completing five of six passes for 34 yards. He was named the starter for the next game against the Phoenix Cardinals, completing two of six passes for 25 yards and helped the team score on a field goal before being replaced on the third series in favor of Bernie Kosar, who had been signed four days earlier. Kosar became the backup quarterback for the rest of the season after the game.

The highlight of Garrett's playing career occurred in the 1994 Thanksgiving Day game when he started in place of backup quarterback Rodney Peete, who was out with a sprained thumb he suffered in a win against the Washington Redskins. Garrett led the Cowboys to a 42–31 comeback victory over the Green Bay Packers by completing 15 of 26 passes for 311 yards and two touchdowns in the second half. He was named NFC Offensive Player of the Week for his performance. That game was named the fourth-best moment in the history of Texas Stadium by ESPN in 2008.

In 1998, Garrett was promoted to the backup position, and in the second game against the Denver Broncos, after Aikman suffered a broken clavicle, Garrett came in to finish the 42–23 loss. He started the next five games and contributed a 3–2 mark for a team that went on to win the NFC East division by one game over the Arizona Cardinals. In 1999, Garrett started two games for a 1–1 record.

Garrett was a part of the 1992, 1993, and 1995 Super Bowl winning teams. In eight seasons with the Cowboys, he played in 39 games and completed 165 of 294 passes (56.1%) for 2,042 yards, 11 touchdowns, and five interceptions.

=== New York Giants ===
In 2000, Garrett was signed as a free agent by the New York Giants to back up Kerry Collins.

On February 27, 2002, Garrett was released for salary cap reasons and re-signed on July 24, although he would be declared inactive in 16 games after being passed on the depth chart by Jesse Palmer, who was later named the backup quarterback.

In 2003, Garrett was declared inactive in 11 games as the third-string quarterback.

=== Tampa Bay Buccaneers ===
On March 15, 2004, Garrett signed with the Tampa Bay Buccaneers and was cut on August 31. On October 13, he was re-signed by the team. After being declared inactive for Weeks 6 and 7, Garrett was released on November 6.

=== Miami Dolphins ===
On November 24, 2004, Garrett was signed as a free agent by the Miami Dolphins and was declared inactive for the last six games of the season.

== Coaching career ==
=== Miami Dolphins ===
After retiring as a player, Garrett became the quarterbacks coach for the Miami Dolphins for the 2005 season under head coach Nick Saban.

=== Dallas Cowboys ===
==== Offensive coordinator ====
In January 2007, Garrett was hired by the Dallas Cowboys to be their offensive coordinator. He guided the Cowboys to the second-best offense in the NFL as the team finished with a 13–3 record, which made Garrett an attractive head coaching prospect. In January 2008, he interviewed for the head coaching job of the Baltimore Ravens and Atlanta Falcons, receiving offers from both, but ultimately opted to remain with the Cowboys. Garrett's salary for the 2008 season was nearly $3 million, the highest salary for an assistant coach in the NFL at the time. On December 29, 2008, the Detroit Lions received permission to speak to Garrett regarding the team's head coaching vacancy according to ESPN sources. In January 2009, the Denver Broncos interviewed him as a possible replacement for Mike Shanahan. Garrett was also a finalist for the St. Louis Rams' head coaching position to replace interim head coach Jim Haslett, but the job ultimately went to Steve Spagnuolo.

==== Head coach ====
On November 8, 2010, Garrett was named interim head coach of the Cowboys after head coach Wade Phillips was fired after the Cowboys began the 2010 season with a 1–7 record. Six days later, Garrett won his first game as a head coach, beating the favored New York Giants by a score of 33–20 at New Meadowlands Stadium. The following week, he led the Cowboys to a 35–19 victory over the Detroit Lions, their first home win all season.

After Garrett finished the 2010 season with a 5–3 record down the stretch, he was officially named the eighth head coach in Cowboys history on January 6, 2011. Garrett was the first head coach born after the team was founded in 1960, and the first former Cowboys player to hold the post. From 2011 to 2013, he had three straight 8–8 seasons, losing in the regular-season finale each season to NFC East division rivals New York Giants, Washington Redskins, and Philadelphia Eagles to miss the division championship and the playoffs each time.

In 2014, Garrett achieved head-coaching success for the first time. The Cowboys, featuring several key draft picks maturing on the offensive line and the emergence of DeMarco Murray as a dominant running back, finished atop the NFC East with a 12–4 record and were tied for the best record in the conference with the Green Bay Packers and the Seattle Seahawks. The Cowboys were undefeated on the road, including impressive wins over the Seahawks and the NFC East frontrunners (at the time), the Philadelphia Eagles. However, Garrett's team lost the three-way tiebreaker to Green Bay and Seattle and therefore hosted the Detroit Lions during the Wild Card Round, which featured a controversial "flag pick up" after a penalty during a late Detroit drive, thereby allowing Dallas an improved chance to make a comeback and defeat the Lions by a score of 24–20. In the Divisional Round against the Green Bay Packers, hyped as a rematch of the famous Ice Bowl NFL championship game from 1967, the Cowboys held a lead in the second half, but after losing the lead due to a late Aaron Rodgers touchdown pass, a potentially game-winning catch by Dez Bryant was overturned in official replay, which sealed a 26–21 road loss to Green Bay.

On January 13, 2015, Cowboys owner Jerry Jones and Garrett agreed on a contract that kept Garrett in Dallas for five more years and paid him $30 million. The Cowboys entered the 2015 season with great expectations, but starting quarterback Tony Romo played in only four games after suffering two fractures in his left collarbone, and the team finished with a 4–12 record.

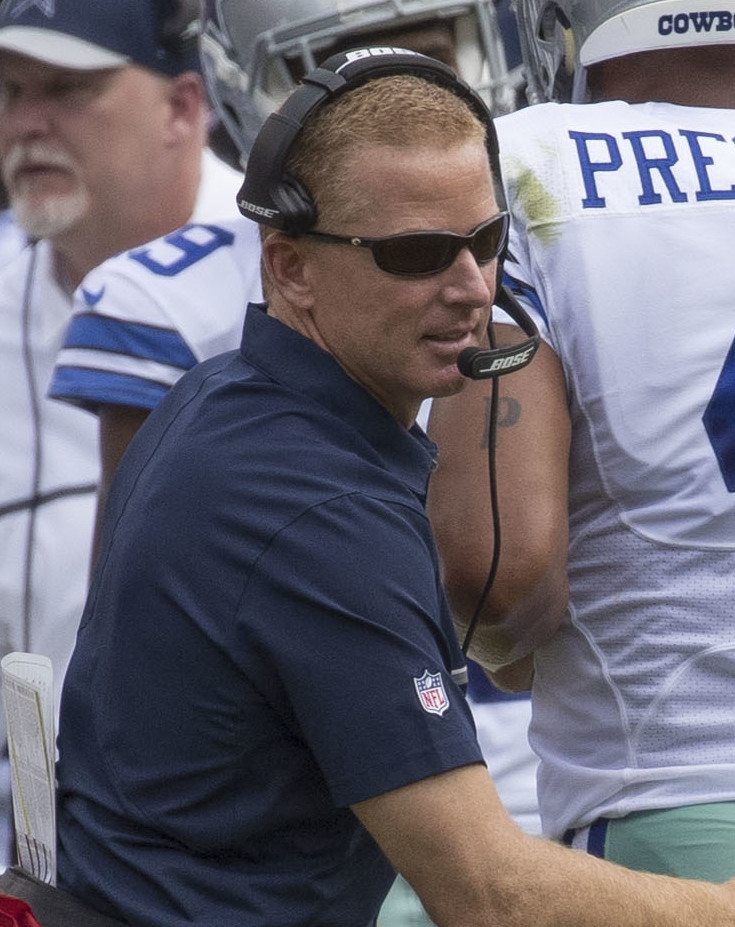
Garrett in 2016

With the emergence of rookie quarterback Dak Prescott and rookie running back Ezekiel Elliott, the Cowboys bounced back in 2016. They finished atop the NFC East with a 13–3 record, aided by an 11-game winning streak, and earned the #1-seed in the NFC along with a first-round bye in the playoffs. However, the Cowboys were upset in their first playoff game by Aaron Rodgers and the Green Bay Packers with a last-second field goal by Mason Crosby, losing 34–31. Garrett was named the NFL Coach of the Year at the end of the season.

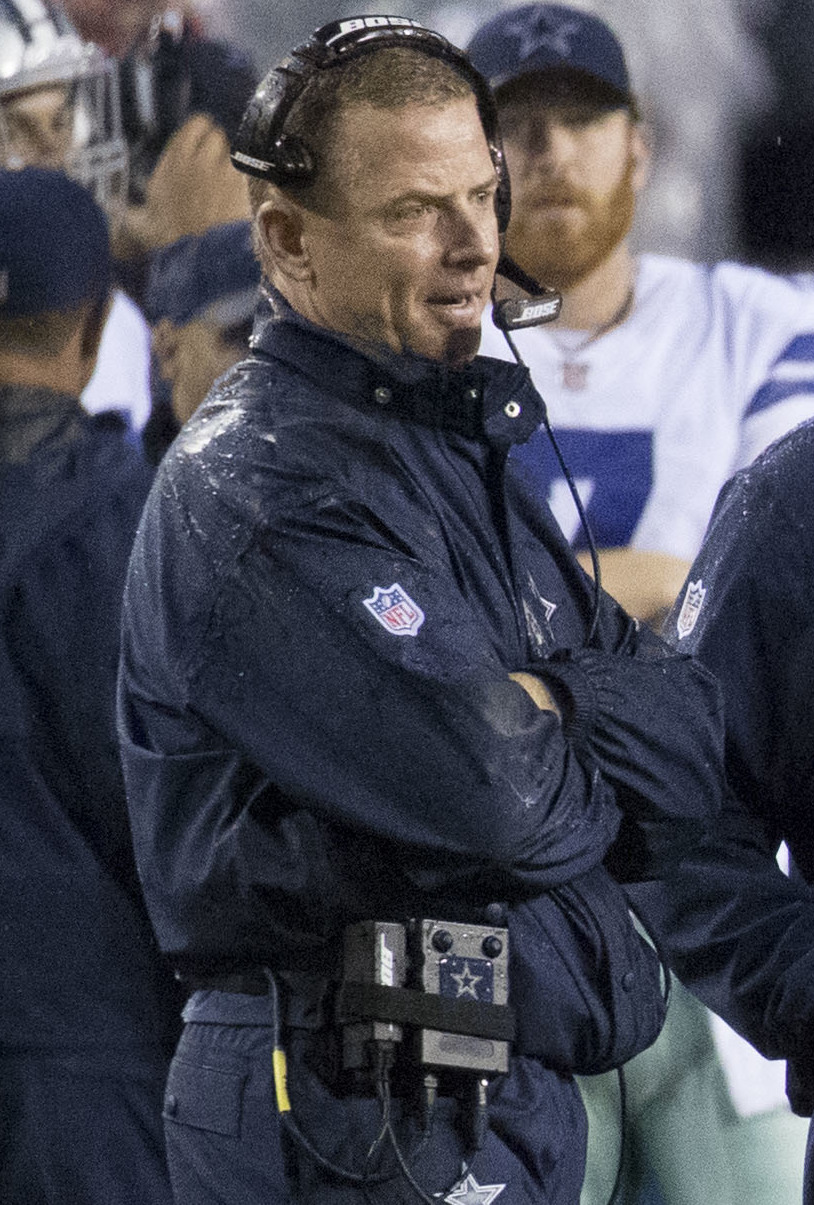
Garrett in 2017

In 2017, the Cowboys finished with a 9–7 record and missed the playoffs. This was partially because star running back Ezekiel Elliott was suspended for six games (Weeks 10–15) as a result of violating the NFL personal conduct policy.

In 2018, the Cowboys bounced back from a disappointing 3–5 record at the bye week to win seven of their last eight games and clinch the NFC East for the third time since Garrett became head coach. The Cowboys narrowly defeated the Seattle Seahawks by a score of 24–22 in the Wild Card Round, but lost on the road in the Divisional Round to the Los Angeles Rams by a score of 30–22.

In 2019, the Cowboys finished with an 8–8 record and missed the playoffs. Towards the end of the season, they had led the NFC East until losing to their division rival, the Philadelphia Eagles in Week 16.

On January 5, 2020, Cowboys owner Jerry Jones announced that the Cowboys would not renew Garrett's contract, which expired at the end of the 2019 season. Garrett finished his Cowboys tenure with an 85–67 (.559) regular-season record and a 2–3 (.400) playoff record for a combined record of 87–70 (.554).

Garrett had the second longest tenure of being the Cowboys head coach after Tom Landry.

=== New York Giants ===
On January 17, 2020, Garrett was hired by the New York Giants as their offensive coordinator under new head coach Joe Judge. Garrett tested positive for COVID-19 in December 2020 and missed the team's Week 15 matchup against the Cleveland Browns.

On November 23, 2021, Garrett was fired by the Giants. Upon his firing, Garrett was rumored to be the frontrunner for the Duke University football head coaching job to replace long time head coach David Cutcliffe. However, just a few days later, Duke hired Mike Elko as their head coach.

== Head coaching record ==
Team	Year	Regular season					Postseason			
Team	Year	Won	Lost	Ties	Win %	Finish	Won	Lost	Win %	Result
DAL*	2010	5	3	0	.625	3rd in NFC East	–	–	–	–
DAL	2011	8	8	0	.500	3rd in NFC East	–	–	–	–
DAL	2012	8	8	0	.500	3rd in NFC East	–	–	–	–
DAL	2013	8	8	0	.500	2nd in NFC East	–	–	–	–
DAL	2014	12	4	0	.750	1st in NFC East	1	1	.500	Lost to Green Bay Packers in NFC Divisional Game
DAL	2015	4	12	0	.250	4th in NFC East	–	–	–	–
DAL	2016	13	3	0	.813	1st in NFC East	0	1	.000	Lost to Green Bay Packers in NFC Divisional Game
DAL	2017	9	7	0	.563	2nd in NFC East	–	–	–	–
DAL	2018	10	6	0	.625	1st in NFC East	1	1	.500	Lost to Los Angeles Rams in NFC Divisional Game
DAL	2019	8	8	0	.500	2nd in NFC East	–	–	–	–
Total		85	67	0	.559		2	3	.400	

* – Interim head coach

== Broadcasting career ==
On April 12, 2022, it was announced that Garrett would be an analyst for NBC Sports broadcasts of the United States Football League. On August 14, it was announced that he had joined Jac Collinsworth as part of Notre Dame Football on NBC. The following month, Garrett joined NBC's Football Night in America, the studio show that airs prior to NBC Sunday Night Football.

== Personal life ==
Garrett's brothers, John and Judd, also played in the World League of American Football. John was the head coach of the Lafayette College football team until 2021 when he was fired, and his younger brother Judd made second-team All-World League in 1991 after leading the league in catches. Judd also worked in the Dallas Cowboys front office after being let go as tight ends coach for the St. Louis Rams. Since he played for the London Monarchs, Judd is the only one of the Garretts who played in the WLAF to have a World Bowl ring. Another brother, Jim Garrett III, is a teacher and former football coach.

In December 2022, Garrett interviewed for the head coaching job at Stanford and was named a finalist. However, he ultimately decided to stay with NBC as a studio analyst.

Garrett's father, Jim Garrett, was an assistant coach for the New York Giants, New Orleans Saints, and Cleveland Browns and head coach of the Houston Texans of the World Football League and at Columbia University. From 1987 to 2004, Jim served as a scout for the Cowboys.

Garrett resides in Dallas with his wife, Brill.
