= Roy Hart (gridiron football) =

American gridiron football player (born 1965)

No. 63, 61, 75
- Position: Defensive tackle

Personal information
- Born: July 10, 1965 (age 61); Tifton, Georgia, U.S.
- Listed height: 6 ft 1 in (1.85 m)
- Listed weight: 280 lb (127 kg)

Career information
- High school: Tift County (Tifton)
- College: South Carolina
- NFL draft: 1988: 6th round, 158th overall pick

Career history
- Seattle Seahawks (1988–1989); London Monarchs (1991); Los Angeles Raiders (1991); New York Jets (1992) *; Hamilton Tiger-Cats (1992–1993); Las Vegas Posse (1994)

Awards and highlights
- World Bowl '91 championship; All-World League (1991); Second-team All-American (1987)

Career NFL statistics
- Sacks: 2
- Stats at Pro Football Reference

Roy Hart Jr. (born July 10, 1965) is an American former professional football player who was a defensive tackle in the National Football League (NFL). He was selected by the Seattle Seahawks in the sixth round of the 1988 NFL draft with the 158th overall pick. He played college football for the South Carolina Gamecocks.

Hart has also played for the London Monarchs, Los Angeles Raiders, Hamilton Tiger-Cats and Las Vegas Posse.
