= John Garrett (American football) =

American football player and coach (born 1965)

Florida State Seminoles
- Title: General manager of player personnel

Personal information
- Born: March 2, 1965 (age 61); Danville, Pennsylvania, U.S.
- Listed height: 5 ft 11 in (1.80 m)
- Listed weight: 180 lb (82 kg)

Career information
- High school: Hunting Valley (OH) University
- College: Princeton
- NFL draft: 1988: undrafted

Career history

Playing
- Dallas Cowboys (1988)*; Cincinnati Bengals (1989); San Antonio Riders (1991); Buffalo Bills (1991)*; Tampa Bay Buccaneers (1992)*
- * Offseason or practice squad member only

Coaching
- Cincinnati Bengals (1995) Offensive assistant & wide receivers coach; Cincinnati Bengals (1996) Wide receivers coach; Cincinnati Bengals (1997–1998) Offensive assistant; Arizona Cardinals (1999–2000) Quarterbacks coach; Cincinnati Bengals (2001) Offensive assistant; Cincinnati Bengals (2002) Tight ends coach; Virginia (2004–2006) Wide receivers coach; Virginia (2007) Assistant head coach & wide receivers coach; Dallas Cowboys (2007–2010) Tight ends coach; Dallas Cowboys (2011–2012) Pass game coordinator & tight ends coach; Tampa Bay Buccaneers (2013) Wide receivers coach; Oregon State (2014) Offensive coordinator; Richmond (2016) Offensive coordinator; Lafayette (2017–2021) Head coach

Operations
- Tampa Bay Buccaneers (1992–1994) Pro personnel assistant; Cincinnati Bengals (2003) Scout; Florida State (2022–2023) Director of scouting; Duke (2024–2026) General manager of player personnel; Florida State (2026–present) Deputy AD / General Manager of Player Personnel

Awards and highlights
- Second-team All-Ivy (1987)

Career NFL statistics
- Receptions: 2
- Receiving yards: 29
- Stats at Pro Football Reference

John Morgan Garrett (born March 2, 1965) is an American football coach and former wide receiver. He is the former head football coach at Lafayette College, a position he assumed December 21, 2016 after spending one season as the offensive coordinator for the University of Richmond. He was also a professional American football wide receiver in the National Football League (NFL) for the Cincinnati Bengals and in the World League of American Football (WLAF) for the San Antonio Riders. He played college football at Columbia University and Princeton University.

== Early life ==
Garrett was born in Danville, Pennsylvania. He attended University School in Hunting Valley, Ohio, where he played wide receiver under head coach Cliff Foust. He graduated in 1983.

Garrett accepted a football scholarship from Columbia University in 1983. His father, Jim Garrett, became the program's head coach in 1985. Garrett sat out the 1985 season because of an injury he suffered in the preseason camp, and decided to drop out of college to save a season of football eligibility.

Following his father's resignation after Columbia's 0–10 record, he and his brothers (Jason and Judd) transferred to Princeton University. He sat out the 1986 season to comply with the NCAA transfer rules, while playing on the scout team, which included both of his brothers. As a senior in 1987, he led the team with 45 receptions for 617 yards and 2 receiving touchdowns. He returned 18 kickoffs for 359 yards and 20 punts for 87 yards. He also began the season as a backup defensive back. He also practiced junior varsity baseball. In 1988, he graduated from Princeton with a degree in history, with a senior thesis on "The American Football League: Its Rivalry with the National Football League and its Impact on Professional Football".

== Professional career ==
Garrett was signed as an undrafted free agent by the Dallas Cowboys after the 1988 NFL draft. He was waived after the first preseason game on August 8. He would return home to New Jersey and work as a teacher.

In 1989, he was signed as a free agent by the Cincinnati Bengals. He was released on August 29 and was signed to the developmental squad on September 6. He was promoted to the active roster in December. He appeared in 2 games, while making 2 receptions for 29 yards. He was released on September 3, 1990.

On February 18, 1991, he was selected by the San Antonio Riders in the World League of American Football Draft. He appeared in 10 games, registering 23 receptions (tied for third on the team) for 386 yards (third on the team) and 3 receiving touchdowns (led the team).

On June 12, 1991, he signed as a free agent with the Buffalo Bills. He was cut on August 19. He was later signed to the practice squad, where he remained for a few weeks before being released.

== Coaching career ==
Garrett began his coaching career in 1990 as a volunteer assistant at Princeton University. From 1992 to 1994, he was an assistant in the pro personnel department for the Tampa Bay Buccaneers.

From 1995 to 1998, Garrett served as an offensive assistant for the Cincinnati Bengals under head coaches Dave Shula and Bruce Coslet, working regularly with the wide receivers. In 1999, he became the quarterbacks coach for the Arizona Cardinals, serving in that position for two seasons under head coach Vince Tobin and helping to develop quarterback Jake Plummer. On January 4, 2001, he was named an offensive assistant for the Bengals under head coach Dick LeBeau, working mostly with the tight ends. On February 11, 2002, he was promoted to tight ends coach after Frank Verducci resigned. On February 5, 2003, he became a full-time scout for the team.

In 2004, Garrett was hired as the wide receivers coach at the University of Virginia, where he worked for three seasons under head coach Al Groh. In 2006, he was promoted to the title of assistant head coach for the offense.

In 2007, he was hired by the Dallas Cowboys to be the tight ends coach, working under his brother Jason Garrett. And beginning in 2011, he began to serve as the passing game coordinator. In 2013, he was hired as the wide receivers coach by the Tampa Bay Buccaneers under head coach Greg Schiano.

In 2014, he was named the offensive coordinator at Oregon State University under head coach Mike Riley. The offense averaged nearly 26 points per game. After the season, Riley left to be the new coach at Nebraska and new head coach Gary Andersen changed the coaching staff. In 2015, Garrett was hired as the offense quality control specialist at the University of Florida under head coach Jim McElwain.

On January 20, 2016, Garrett was named offensive coordinator and quarterbacks coordinator at the University of Richmond under head coach Danny Rocco. The team finished with a 10–4 record and advanced to the NCAA FCS Playoff quarterfinals, while ranking second in the Colonial Athletic Association with an average of 28.6 points and 410 yards of total offense per game. The offense led the conference with 271.5 passing yards per game.

On December 21, 2016, Garrett accepted the position as head football coach at Lafayette College.

Garrett was fired by Lafayette on November 22, 2021 after the loss to Lehigh during Rivalry 157.

== Personal life ==
Garrett comes from a family of coaches. His father Jim Garrett was an assistant coach for the New York Giants (1970–1973), New Orleans Saints (1976–77), and Cleveland Browns (1978–84), the head coach of the Houston Texans of the fledgling WFL (1974), and the head football coach at Columbia University (1985). From 1987 to 2004, he served as a scout for the Dallas Cowboys.

Garrett's brother Jason was formerly the head coach of the Dallas Cowboys, while another brother, Judd, previously worked for the Cowboys in the pro personnel department. A third brother, Jim, is chairman of the English Department at John's alma mater, University School.

Garrett is married to Honor Garrett. With his wife, he has four children named John Morgan, Honor, Olivia, and Caroline.

== Head coaching record ==
| Year | Team | Overall | Conference | Standing | Bowl/playoffs |
|---|---|---|---|---|---|
Lafayette Leopards (Patriot League) (2017–2021)
| 2017 | Lafayette | 3–8 | 3–3 | T–3rd | |
| 2018 | Lafayette | 3–8 | 2–4 | T–4th | |
| 2019 | Lafayette | 4–8 | 4–2 | 2nd | |
| 2020–21 | Lafayette | 2–1 | 2–1 | T–1st (South) | |
| 2021 | Lafayette | 3–8 | 2–4 | 5th | |
| Lafayette: | | 15–33 | 13–14 | | |
| Total: | | 15–33 | | | |
