= Steve Gabbard =

American football player (born 1966)

No. 67, 72, 66
- Position: Offensive tackle

Personal information
- Born: July 19, 1966 (age 60); Lexington, Kentucky, U.S.
- Listed height: 6 ft 4 in (1.93 m)
- Listed weight: 275 lb (125 kg)

Career information
- High school: Independence (Charlotte, North Carolina)
- College: Florida State
- NFL draft: 1989: undrafted

Career history
- Philadelphia Eagles (1989); → London Monarchs (1991); Green Bay Packers (1991); Washington Redskins (1992)*; Sacramento Gold Miners (1993)
- * Offseason or practice squad member only
- Stats at Pro Football Reference

Stephen Edward Gabbard (born July 19, 1966) is a former offensive tackle in the National Football League.

== Career ==
1988 Second Team All-South Independent in college, Gabbard was originally signed to the Philadelphia Eagles as a free agent offensive tackle and participated in two playoff games. He spent two seasons as a member of the practice squad and suffered a knee injury. After surgery, he was sent to the World Football League to rehabilitate, where he was the first draft selection to the London Monarchs. The Monarchs were World Bowl '91 Champions, with the offensive line "Nasty Boyz" becoming a fan favorite.

He became a member of the Green Bay Packers during the 1991 NFL season as an offensive lineman and a member of the special teams (long snapper). After a year at Green Bay, he was signed as a Plan B free agent by the Washington Redskins. He also played a year in the Canadian Football League for the Sacramento Gold Miners as a starting left tackle.

He played at the collegiate level at Florida State University, where he was a four-year starter at defensive tackle, was a 1987 Football News All-American, a 1989 AP Honorable Mention All-American and All-South Independent Honorable Mention in 1987 and 1988. The Seminoles were All-American, Gator, Fiesta and Sugar Bowl Champions during his four years as starting defensive tackle.

Gabbard also served as a graduate assistant offensive line coach for three years at Florida State for Bobby Bowden, during which time FSU won the NCAA National Championship (1999) in an undefeated season where they were the #1 ranked team nationally wire-to-wire. Florida State was also runner-up to NCAA National Champions Tennessee Volunteers (1998) in the Fiesta Bowl, and won the Sugar Bowl (1997) during his time on Coach Bowden's staff.

His son Stephen also played football at Florida State, where he was a four-year starter at the long snapper position.
