= Victor Ebubedike =

American football player (born 1966)

Medal record

Men's American football

Representing United Kingdom

European Championship
Gold medal – first place	1989 West Germany	Team

Victor Ebubedike (born 1 February 1966), also known as Victor X Ebubedike and Victor Muhammad, is an English former gridiron football player who played as a running back for London Ravens, from 1983 to 1990, then onto the NFL Europe's London Monarchs from 1991 to 1992 and 1995 to 1998.

== Early life and career ==
Ebubedike was born and raised in London, England, and is of Nigerian descent. He played association football in his youth. On his 16th birthday, while on a walk through Hyde Park, he stumbled upon the London Ravens – the U.K.'s first ever American football team. Ebubedike joined the team and quickly became one of the best players in Europe. He led the team to a win over the Streatham Olympians in the 1985 Summer Bowl at Villa Park to close the inaugural AFL UK season. In 1986, Ebubedike helped the team win the first-ever Budweiser Bowl before joining the Harper Hawks football team at Harper College in Palatine, Illinois. Ebubedike flew back to England to help the Ravens win the 1987 Budweiser Bowl, rushing for 176 yards and three touchdowns in their 40–23 win over the Manchester All-Stars. Overall, he rushed for 3,770 yards and 66 touchdowns in his three competitive seasons with the Ravens, averaging 8.9 yards per carry.

== Professional career ==
In May 1990, Ebubedike was signed by the New York Jets. However, he was cut that July to free up a roster spot for Mike Martin. Regardless, Ebubedike was the first British player, other than a kicker, to make an NFL training camp.

Ebubedike joined the London Monarchs ahead of the inaugural 1991 season of the World League of American Football (WLAF) after a tryout in Orlando, Florida. He was a part of Operation Discovery, a talent search program that placed homegrown European players on WLAF rosters. Ebubedike was one of four British players named to the final 40-man roster in March. He played exclusively on special teams in his first two games, and even made the first tackle in league history in their season-opening win over the Frankfurt Galaxy. He was put in at running back for the first time in the fourth quarter of their week three win over the Orlando Thunder at Wembley Stadium and become the first Operation Discovery player to record a carry when he ran for a ten-yard first down. Five plays later, he became the first Operation Discovery player to score a touchdown, and finished the game with six carries for 44 yards and the score. Ebubedike won the inaugural World Bowl with the Monarchs when they defeated the Barcelona Dragons 21–0. Ebubedike was later named a second-team all-World League selection via a spot designated for an Operation Discovery player, with fellow Englishman Phil Alexander earning the first-team nod.

Ebubedike returned to the London Monarchs in 1992. However, he suffered damage to his knee ligaments in a preseason win over the Birmingham Fire. Ebubedike signed with the North West Spartans later that year, ahead of the European Challenge Bowl final. He scored two touchdowns in their 42–25 defeat to the Hamburg Blue Devils. The WLAF suspended operations in 1993. Consequently, Ebubedike played with the Great Britain Spartans in the inaugural 1994 season of the Football League of Europe. When the London Monarchs returned in 1995, Ebubedike was one of seven British players named to the Monarchs roster. He rushed for a franchise-record 46-yard touchdown run in a 34–14 win over the Rhein Fire. Muhammad played with Monarchs the until their final season in 1998, finishing his career with 116 carries for 416 yards and four touchdowns. He played in several leagues around Europe before returning to England, where he played his final game in 2013.

== National team career ==
On 29 September 1985, Ebubedike represented the Great Britain national team in the side's first-ever international fixture, scoring the sole touchdown in their 7–0 win over France. He scored two touchdowns in a 59–2 victory over France during qualifiers for the 1987 European Championship.

Ebubedike led Great Britain to a gold medal at the 1989 European Championships.

== Personal life ==
After joining the Nation of Islam, Ebubedike changed his name to Victor X and then Victor Muhammad. He later worked as a coach and a firefighter.
