= Judd Garrett =

American football player and coach (born 1967)

Profile
- Position: Running back

Personal information
- Born: June 25, 1967 (age 59); Abington, Pennsylvania, U.S.
- Listed height: 6 ft 2 in (1.88 m)
- Listed weight: 220 lb (100 kg)

Career information
- High school: University (OH)
- College: Princeton
- NFL draft: 1990: 12th round, 328th overall pick

Career history

Playing
- Philadelphia Eagles (1990)*; Dallas Cowboys (1990); London Monarchs (1991–1992); Buffalo Bills (1991)*; Seattle Seahawks (1992)*; Dallas Cowboys (1993)*; Las Vegas Posse (1994); Carolina Panthers (1995)*; San Antonio Texans (1995)*
- * Offseason or practice squad member only

Coaching
- Princeton (1990) Assistant coach; University School (1996) Assistant coach; New Orleans Saints (1997–1999) Offensive assistant; Miami Dolphins (2000–2002) Offensive quality control/receivers; Miami Dolphins (2003) Offensive quality control/quarterbacks; Miami Dolphins (2004) Offensive quality control/receivers; Miami Dolphins (2005) Offensive quality control; St. Louis Rams (2006–2007) Tight ends coach

Operations
- Dallas Cowboys (2008–2016) Director of pro scouting; Dallas Cowboys (2017–2019) Director of advance scouting

Awards and highlights
- Super Bowl champion (XXVIII); World Bowl champion (I); Second-team All-World (1991); Division I-AA All-American (1989); Ivy League Player of the Year (1989); All-Ivy League (1989)

Judd Garrett (born June 25, 1967) is an American former professional football running back in the National Football League (NFL) for the Dallas Cowboys. He also was a member of the Las Vegas Posse in the Canadian Football League (CFL) and the London Monarchs in the World League of American Football (WLAF). He played college football at Princeton University. He is the former Director of Pro Scouting for the Dallas Cowboys.

== Early life ==
Garrett attended University School in Hunting Valley, Ohio, where he earned a varsity letter in football, basketball, and track. He was named Most Valuable Player in all three sports his senior year. In football, as a senior, Garrett gained a school record 2,011 yards rushing and scored 35 touchdowns. He was selected first-team All-state and received the Cleveland Touchdown Club's Lou Groza Award which is given to the Most Valuable Player in Northeast Ohio. He graduated in 1985.

Prior to University School, from 1978 to 1981 Garrett attended grade school at Saint Ann Catholic School which is located in Cleveland Heights, Ohio. In his three years at Saint Ann's, Garrett played in three consecutive City Championship Football Games and his team won the City Championship in 1979.

== College career ==
Although Garrett had been accepted at Princeton University, he decided to attend Columbia University when his father, Jim Garrett, became the head coach. He played fullback for the freshman team, leading them in rushing, receiving, scoring and kickoff return yards. Following his father's resignation after Columbia's 0–10 1985 season, although none played varsity for different reasons, Judd and his brothers, Jason and John, transferred to Princeton University.

Garrett sat out the 1986 season because of the transfer rules, while playing on the scout team that included his brothers. He became a three-year starter at running back and graduated in 1990. In his senior year, he posted 307 carries (school record), 1,347 rushing yards (school record), 14 touchdowns (school record) and was the team's leading receiver with 34 receptions for 351 yards, while leading the Tigers to their first Ivy League championship in 20 years. Following his senior season, Garrett was awarded the Asa S. Bushnell Cup which is given to the Ivy League Player of the Year, and he was selected to the Division I-AA All-American team.

In his three seasons, Garrett set the school-career records for carries (687), rushing yards (3,109), all-purpose yardage (4,510), scoring (248 points), rushing touchdowns (32) and total touchdowns (41). He played in the 1990 Hula Bowl where he scored the first touchdown of the game. Garrett also represented the Ivy League with a group of 40 league All-Stars in the Epson Ivy Bowl in Tokyo vs. a team of Japanese All-Stars. He wrote a senior thesis on "Religion and Sports: A World Apart?".

== Professional career ==
Garrett was selected by the Philadelphia Eagles in the twelfth round (201st overall) of the 1990 NFL draft. He was released on September 3.

On September 11, 1990, he was signed by the Dallas Cowboys to replace running back Timmy Smith, but he suffered a shoulder injury in practice and was placed on the injured reserve list on September 12. He was waived injured after four weeks.

Garrett then played the next two seasons (1991–1992) with the London Monarchs of the World League of American Football. In his first season in London, he led the league in receptions with 71, while helping the team amass an 11-1 record and the first ever World Bowl Championship. In that championship game, Garrett set a World Bowl record of 13 receptions and caught the game sealing touchdown with less than a minute left in the first half. After the 1991 season, Garrett was selected to the second-team All-World League team. The next year de posted 55 receptions (fifth in the league) for 509 yards and one touchdown.

On June 13, 1991, he was signed as a free agent by the Buffalo Bills, but was released before the start of the season on August 21.

On June 4, 1992, he signed with the Seattle Seahawks. He was cut on August 24.

Garrett spent the 1993 season on the Dallas Cowboys practice squad, earning a Super Bowl ring. He was released on August 23, 1994.

On September 7, 1994, he was signed by the Las Vegas Posse of the Canadian Football League. He appeared in 8 games, registering 50 carries for 232 yards, 3 rushing touchdowns and 9 receptions for 105 yards.

In 1995, he signed with the NFL expansion team Carolina Panthers and was released on August 21. He later signed with the San Antonio Texans of the Canadian Football League.

== Coaching career ==
Garrett started his NFL coaching career as an assistant football coach at Princeton University in 1990. He was an assistant football coach at University School in 1996. He was hired as an offensive assistant with the New Orleans Saints under Mike Ditka from 1997 to 1999.

In 2000, he was hired as an offensive quality control/receivers assistant with the Miami Dolphins. He spent six seasons from 2000 to 2005, as an assistant coach under Dave Wannstedt and Nick Saban, during which time the Dolphins had five winning seasons, won a Division Title and had two play-off appearances. After the 2005 season, Garrett was hired by the St. Louis Rams to coach tight ends. He stayed with the Rams from 2006 to 2007. He was hired by the Dallas Cowboys as the director of pro scouting in May 2008.

== Personal life ==
Garrett has two brothers who have coached in the NFL. Jason is the former head coach of the Dallas Cowboys and John is the current General Manager for Player Personnel for the football program at Duke University. All three of the Garrett brothers played in the World League of American Football.

His father (Jim Garrett) was an assistant coach for the New York Giants (1970–1973), New Orleans Saints (1976–1977), and Cleveland Browns (1978–1984), head coach of the Houston Texans of the fledgling WFL (1974), and head football coach at Columbia University (1985). From 1987 to 2004, he served as a scout for the Dallas Cowboys.
