= Stan Gelbaugh =

American gridiron football player (born 1962)

No. 8, 10, 16, 18
- Position: Quarterback

Personal information
- Born: December 4, 1962 (age 63); Carlisle, Pennsylvania, U.S.
- Listed height: 6 ft 3 in (1.91 m)
- Listed weight: 207 lb (94 kg)

Career information
- High school: Cumberland Valley (Mechanicsburg, Pennsylvania)
- College: Maryland
- NFL draft: 1986: 6th round, 150th overall pick

Career history
- Dallas Cowboys (1986)*; Saskatchewan Roughriders (1986); Buffalo Bills (1986–1989); Cincinnati Bengals (1990)*; London Monarchs (1991); Hamilton Tiger-Cats (1991)*; Kansas City Chiefs (1991)*; Phoenix Cardinals (1991); London Monarchs (1992); Seattle Seahawks (1992–1996)
- * Offseason or practice squad member only

Awards and highlights
- World Bowl champion (1991); WLAF Offensive MVP (1991)

Career NFL statistics
- Passing attempts: 391
- Passing completions: 192
- Completion percentage: 49.1%
- TD–INT: 10–22
- Passing yards: 2,100
- Passer rating: 50.5
- Stats at Pro Football Reference

Stanley Morris Gelbaugh (born December 4, 1962) is an American former professional football player who was a quarterback in the National Football League (NFL) for the Buffalo Bills, Phoenix Cardinals and Seattle Seahawks. He attained his greatest success in the World League of American Football (WLAF) with the London Monarchs, where he was the league's Offensive Most Valuable Player in its inaugural season. He played college football for the Maryland Terrapins.

== Early life ==
Gelbaugh lettered in football, basketball and track at Cumberland Valley High School. He played as a quarterback, punter and placekicker.

He accepted a football scholarship from the University of Maryland. As a redshirt freshman he was tried at wide receiver in the spring, before being switched back to quarterback in the fall.

He spent his first two and a half years punting and as the backup to Boomer Esiason in 1983 and Frank Reich in the 1984 season. After Reich went down with a shoulder injury in Week 4 against Wake Forest, Gelbaugh took over the starting role. After a loss to Penn State in which he set a school record with 48 pass attempts, Gelbaugh and the Terps reeled off three straight victories. In Week 9, while visiting Bernie Kosar and the defending national champion Miami Hurricanes, the Hurricanes jumped out to a 31–0 lead at halftime. Gelbaugh was replaced by Reich, who led the Terps to a thrilling 42–40 comeback in the second half, a then- record comeback in college football history.

Going into the following season, he was the starting quarterback for a team that was ranked #1 in the preseason poll. He passed for 2,475 yards, breaking Esiason's single-season record. He also broke the record for passing yardage in a game with 361 yards against Clemson University, led the ACC in total offense with 216.8 yards-per-game and was second in passing efficiency. Even though the team went 9–3 overall, the team had a perfect 6–0 record in the Atlantic Coast Conference, giving them the conference title. The season ended with a victory over Syracuse in the Cherry Bowl, where he passed for 223 yards and two touchdowns, and added another rushing score. Gelbaugh was named offensive MVP of the game.

He finished his college career second overall in school history in yardage and third in completions. He had a 13–4 record in the games he started and became the first Terrapins quarterback with three career 300-yard games.

== Professional career ==
=== Buffalo ===
Gelbaugh was selected in the sixth round (150th overall) of the 1986 NFL draft by the Dallas Cowboys. On August 18, he was waived after not being able to pass Reggie Collier on the depth chart.

He briefly became a punter for the Saskatchewan Roughriders of the Canadian Football League and averaged 40.2 yards on 45 punts, before being waived on October 7. He also served as a backup quarterback, though he did not throw a pass.

Gelbaugh signed with the Buffalo Bills in November 1986, and served as Jim Kelly's backup (he was active in 5 games). He injured his elbow during training camp the following year, and was placed on injured reserve. In 1988, he was waived and re-signed later in the week, though he still did not see any playing time and was active in only three games. Despite being waived three times by the Bills in 1989, he did see some action at the end of a game against the New York Jets, taking a knee to end the game. All told, during his time with the Bills, he was signed and waived four times.

He signed with the Cincinnati Bengals in the 1990 offseason as a free agent. Even though coach Sam Wyche thought he was good enough to be a starter, he was cut before training camp was completed. In 1990, he was selling photocopiers and fax machines to make money while still looking for a job in football; he would later remark that he would sooner face a blitz than deal with secretaries.

=== Europe ===
In the spring of 1990, the National Football League set up a developmental league for players, with several teams in Europe, called the World League of American Football. Jim Haslett, a former teammate of Gelbaugh's with the Bills, was an assistant coach with the Sacramento Surge. Haslett convinced Gelbaugh to give up selling office equipment and come back to football. The plan was for the Surge to draft Gelbaugh in the league's supplemental draft. However, the Surge passed on Gelbaugh and picked Anthony Henton, a linebacker. He ended up with the London Monarchs. London's head coach was Larry Kennan, who had worked out Gelbaugh while Kennan was an assistant with the Los Angeles Raiders. Gelbaugh didn't think the job would last, and even after being drafted, made plans to get his teaching certificate and teach at DeMatha Catholic High School in Hyattsville, Maryland.

"We had only 10 footballs; the rest were stuck in customs. We played with the same footballs for two weeks. After one day, they were all bad. After five days it was ridiculous. It was like a throwback. I felt like Otto Graham out there throwing a stuffed pillow."

— Stan Gelbaugh, on playing football in rainy London.

In the first game of the new league, Gelbaugh and fellow Monarchs quarterback John Witkowski led the Monarchs to victory over the Frankfurt Galaxy. Gelbaugh's 96-yard touchdown to Jon Horton was the league's first passing touchdown. In week 2, he took over the starting job full-time, and led the Monarchs to a comeback victory against the New York/New Jersey Knights in the Monarchs' home opener, the first of three straight 300-yard games for Gelbaugh. In Week 5, he threw for four touchdowns and 286 yards as the Monarchs beat the Montreal Machine 45–7. The following week, he led the Monarchs over the Raleigh-Durham Skyhawks with 361 yards and three touchdowns. After getting knocked out of a game against the Knights with a bruised shoulder in week 8, he returned the following game to throw for 325 yards and a touchdown in a victory over the Sacramento Surge.

He credited much of his success to his offensive line, nicknamed the "Nasty Boyz", who allowed the fewest sacks in the league. The Monarchs finished the regular season with a loss to the Barcelona Dragons, 20–17; the loss would end up being the only one of the year. In the playoffs, Gelbaugh got revenge on the Knights for his injury by throwing for 391 yards and 5 touchdowns in a 42–26 comeback victory to send the Monarchs to the inaugural World Bowl.

In the World Bowl, Gelbaugh managed the Monarchs effectively, throwing for 191 yards and two touchdowns en route to a 21–0 Monarchs victory over Barcelona. He finished the season atop several passing categories; his 2,655 yards, 92.8 passer rating, and .624 completion percentage were best in the league, and he was tied for the lead in touchdown passes (17). For his efforts, he was named Offensive Most Valuable Player of the league, earning him a $25,000 bonus.

=== Phoenix Cardinals ===
After his success in Europe, he initially failed to sign with an NFL team. Due to WLAF rules, any NFL team signing him would have had to pay double his WLAF salary, which ended up as $90,000 after bonuses, just to negotiate with him. In the end, the WLAF waived the fee, leaving Gelbaugh free to sign with any team. Although he was interested in joining the San Diego Chargers, he signed with the Hamilton Tiger-Cats of the CFL as a member of their practice squad. The two sides could not come to an agreement, and Gelbaugh was waived in August.

He signed with the Kansas City Chiefs on August 12 and was waived seven days later. On September 18, he was signed by the Phoenix Cardinals, who were having quarterback trouble after starter Timm Rosenbach was injured for the season, and backup Tom Tupa was underperforming. After appearances in two games against Minnesota and the New York Giants, he earned his first start in a 14–10 loss to San Francisco in Week 12. A week later, he was picked off four times by the Philadelphia Eagles, and the next week he was pulled in favor of Chris Chandler after blowing a lead against the Washington Redskins. Gelbaugh played one more time in the season finale against New Orleans after Chandler was intercepted twice; Gelbaugh threw three interceptions in a Cardinals loss.

Gelbaugh later announced that he would return to the Monarchs for the 1992 WLAF season; although he was contractually obligated to return, he viewed it as another opportunity for him to showcase his talents for a possible NFL return. Before his return, he was signed by the Seattle Seahawks, who picked him up as a Plan B free agent. He signed with Seattle because the Seahawks' offensive coordinator, Larry Kennan, was his coach with the Monarchs.

=== Return to London ===
Gelbaugh's first game back was an overtime victory over the Knights in London; he finished the day with 349 passing yards, two touchdowns, and one interception. Unfortunately, under new head coach Ray Willsey the Monarchs would go on a seven-game winless streak. The lone highlight of the season was a 45–13 drubbing of the Montreal Machine, but the Monarchs finished the season 2-7-1 and at the bottom of the European division.

His numbers were down slightly from his MVP season a year earlier; he finished the season with 1,966 yards, and 11 touchdowns to 12 interceptions. Although the league suspended play after the 1992 season, Gelbaugh did not want to return anyway, citing the stress of two seasons in one year as too much.

=== Seattle Seahawks: 1992–1996 ===
Gelbaugh joined the Seahawks for the 1992 season, planning to be the third-string quarterback behind Dan McGwire and Kelly Stouffer. His first appearance came in relief of McGwire in week 7 against the Dallas Cowboys, but he threw an interception that was returned for a touchdown, and the Seahawks lost 27–0. With McGwire on injured reserve and Stouffer injured, Gelbaugh got the start the following week against the Los Angeles Raiders, but the Seahawks were shut out for the second consecutive week. He started the next two games, both Seahawks losses, while waiting for Stouffer to return from his shoulder injury.

His next action would come in relief of Stouffer against the Denver Broncos, and he would lead the team to an improbable comeback on Monday Night Football, throwing a game-tying touchdown on the final play of regulation. The Seahawks would win the game in overtime on John Kasay's 32-yard game winner; Gelbaugh finished the evening with 164 yards and a touchdown in less than a full quarter's work. He would continue to trade time with Stouffer for the rest of the season, but the Seahawks were unable to win any more games, and finished the season with the fewest points scored in a 16-game season in league history.

Although Gelbaugh was resigned for the 1993 season, his only appearance came in relief of injured starter Rick Mirer in the fourth quarter of a game against the New England Patriots. He then spent two years on the bench, only making a brief appearance in the 1994 season finale. In 1996, he started the last regular season game against the Raiders, but was injured on the second series of downs after tearing a groin muscle. Gelbaugh retired after the 1996 season.

== Personal life ==
Gelbaugh's nickname while playing was "Blueprint", due to his knowledge of many different offenses. (The nickname proved to be appropriate for his post-football career: he is now the senior vice president at Kalmia, an interior construction company in Maryland.) Stan is married to Denise Del Vecchio Gelbaugh. He has two children, Paul and Elizabeth; three step-sons, Andrew, Patrick, and Sam; and a grandson, Wyatt.
