= Dana Brinson =

American football player (born 1965)

No. 33, 81
- Position: Wide receiver

Personal information
- Born: April 10, 1965 (age 61); Valdosta, Georgia, U.S.
- Listed height: 5 ft 9 in (1.75 m)
- Listed weight: 167 lb (76 kg)

Career information
- High school: Valdosta
- College: Nebraska
- NFL draft: 1989: 8th round, 204th overall pick

Career history
- San Diego Chargers (1989); Atlanta Falcons (1990)*; London Monarchs (1991)
- * Offseason or practice squad member only

Awards and highlights
- World Bowl champion (1991)

Career NFL statistics
- Rushing yards: 64
- Rushing average: 3.8
- Receptions: 12
- Receiving yards: 71
- Stats at Pro Football Reference

Dana Brinson (born April 10, 1965) is an American former professional football player who was a wide receiver in the National Football League (NFL). He was drafted by the San Diego Chargers in the eighth round of the 1989 NFL draft. He played college football for the Nebraska Cornhuskers.

Brinson made the Chargers' roster in 1989, when he competed in the preseason with popular veteran Lionel James, who was eventually cut in favor of the quicker rookie. Brinson also played for the London Monarchs of the World League of American Football (WLAF).
