= Danny Crossman =

American football player and coach (born 1967)

Pittsburgh Steelers
- Title: Special teams coordinator

Personal information
- Born: January 17, 1967 (age 59); El Paso, Texas, U.S.

Career information
- College: Pittsburgh

Career history

Playing
- London Monarchs (1991–1992)

Coaching
- U.S. Coast Guard Academy (1993) Defensive backs coach & special teams coach; Western Kentucky (1994–1996); Defensive backs coach (1994–1995); Outside linebackers coach (1996); UCF (1997–1998) Defensive backs coach & special teams coordinator; Georgia Tech (1999–2001); Defensive ends coach & special teams coordinator (1999–2000); Defensive backs coach & special teams coordinator (2001); Michigan State (2002) Linebackers coach & special teams coordinator; Carolina Panthers (2003–2009); Special teams assistant (2003–2004); Special teams coach (2005–2006); Special teams coordinator (2007–2009); Detroit Lions (2010–2012) Special teams coordinator; Buffalo Bills (2013–2018) Special teams coordinator; Miami Dolphins (2019–2024); Special teams coordinator (2019–2024); Assistant head coach & special teams coordinator (2021); Pittsburgh Steelers (2026–present) Special teams coordinator

Awards and highlights
- World Bowl champion (I); World Bowl MVP (I); Second-team All-East (1989)

Daniel Crossman (born January 17, 1967) is an American football coach who is currently the special teams coordinator for the Pittsburgh Steelers of the National Football League (NFL). He served as special teams coordinator for the Carolina Panthers (2007–2009), Detroit Lions (2010–2012), Buffalo Bills (2013–2018), and Miami Dolphins (2019–2024).

== Playing career ==
Crossman was a second-team all-America and all-Big East cornerback at Pittsburgh. He lettered two seasons (1987 and 1989) as a defensive back and one (1988) as the Panthers’ starting fullback. As a senior, he served as team captain and was named the squad's MVP as he led the Panthers to the 1989 Sun Bowl. He also played one season at Kansas, where he was a Freshman All-America by The Sporting News in 1985 before following KU head coach Mike Gottfried to Pittsburgh.

Crossman signed as a free agent with the Washington Redskins in 1990. He made the squad, but was put on injured reserve after just three games. He also spent time on injured reserve with the Detroit Lions in 1991 and 1992.

He captained the London Monarchs of the World League of American Football in 1991 and 1992, earning All-League honors. He recorded three interceptions and earned MVP honors in the inaugural World Bowl, leading the Monarchs to the league title.

== Coaching career ==
Crossman began his coaching career at the U.S. Coast Guard Academy in 1993 where he coached the defensive backs and special teams. Crossman spent the years 2003–2009 as a member of the Carolina Panthers' coaching staff. He was the Panthers' special teams coordinator over his last 5 seasons with the team. Crossman was hired by the Detroit Lions in 2010 as special teams coordinator. On September 30, 2012, against the Lions, the Minnesota Vikings returned a kickoff and a punt for a touchdown for the first time in a single game in franchise history.

On February 8, 2019, the Miami Dolphins announced Crossman as their special teams coordinator. He received an additional title of assistant head coach on March 11, 2021. On January 10, 2025, Crossman was fired by the Dolphins.

On February 4, 2026, the Pittsburgh Steelers hired Crossman as their special teams coordinator under head coach Mike McCarthy.

== Personal life ==
Crossman earned his bachelor's degree in business administration and communications from Pittsburgh in 1990. He and his wife, Susan, have a son, Kyle, and a daughter, Kaylie.
