= Intercontinental Football League =

European league proposed by the NFL in the 1970s

The Intercontinental Football League (IFL) was a proposed professional American football league in Europe in the early 1970s. The league was spearheaded by Bob Kap, Tex Schramm, and Al Davis, but failed to materialize. The IFL and European leagues that began shortly after the proposed league such as the European Football League (Eurobowl), is credited with "setting the stage" for NFL Europe.

Despite the league's goals, the IFL did not materialize - the Pro Football Researchers Association attributed this failure to Europe not being ready for American football, potential competition with the World Football League (WFL), a players' strike during the summer of 1974, and the recession that had been "gripping the nation". Another factor was the turmoil in Europe in 1974: Turkey had invaded Cyprus, the American ambassador to Cyprus had been assassinated, Basque separatists had assassinated the prime minister of Spain, and terrorist groups like the Red Brigades had engaged in kidnapping. This turmoil led the State Department to meet with NFL commissioner Pete Rozelle; the officials discouraged him from pursuing the league further. The IFL also suffered a potentially fatal blow when Pan American World Airways, who Kap had brought on as a sponsor, pulled out of the project. Ultimately, Rozelle deemed the creation of the league "impractical".

== Proposed teams ==
=== For the 1975 season ===
- Barcelona Almogovares (Spain)
- Berlin Bears (Germany)
- Istanbul Conquerors (Turkey)
- Munich Lions (Germany)
- Rome Gladiators (Italy)
- Vienna Lipizzaners (Austria)

=== New teams for the 1976 season ===
- Copenhagen Vikings (Denmark)
- Milan Centurions (Italy)
- Paris Lafayettes (France)
- Rotterdam Flying Dutchmen (Netherlands)
