= Jim Garrett =

American football player and coach (1930–2018)

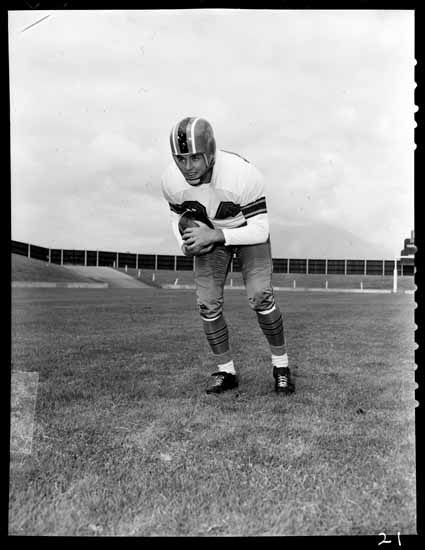
- Garrett in 1955

No. 84
- Position: Halfback

Personal information
- Born: June 19, 1930; Passaic, New Jersey, U.S.
- Died: February 9, 2018 (aged 87); Monmouth Beach, New Jersey, U.S.
- Listed height: 6 ft 0 in (1.83 m)
- Listed weight: 192 lb (87 kg)

Career information
- High school: Rutherford (NJ)
- College: Utah State
- NFL draft: 1952: undrafted

Career history

Playing
- Philadelphia Eagles (1954)*; BC Lions (1955); New York Giants (1956); Ottawa Roughriders (1957)*
- * Offseason or practice squad member only

Coaching
- Lehigh (1959) Assistant coach; Susquehanna (1960–1965) Head coach; Orlando Panthers (1968) Assistant coach; New York Giants (1970) Special teams coach; New York Giants (1971) Offensive backfield coach; New York Giants (1972–1973) Defensive coordinator; Houston Texans (1974) Head coach; New Orleans Saints (1976–1977) Defensive backs coach; Cleveland Browns (1978–1981) Offensive backs coach; Cleveland Browns (1982–1984) Director research and development; Columbia (1985) Head coach

Operations
- Dallas Cowboys (1968–1969) Player scout; Dallas Cowboys (1974–1975) Player scout; Buffalo Bills (1986) Player scout; Dallas Cowboys (1987–2003) College scout

Awards and highlights
- 3× Super Bowl champion (XXVII, XXVIII, XXX); All-Skyline Conference (1950)
- Coaching profile at Pro Football Reference

James William Garrett Jr. (June 19, 1930 – February 9, 2018) was an American football player, coach, and scout. He played college football at Utah State University. He served as football head football coach at Susquehanna University from 1960 to 1965 and Columbia University in 1985, compiling a career college football head coaching record of 39–21–1.

== Early life ==
Garrett attended Rutherford High School, where he played as a halfback and linebacker. He was an All-county and All-state selection in 1946 and 1947. He also received All-state honors in baseball as a senior.

He accepted a football scholarship from Saint Mary's College of California. He transferred after his sophomore season to Utah State University and had to sit out for one year. He was an All-Skyline Conference fullback as a junior in 1950. He also led the baseball team in batting with a .429 average as a senior, while playing catcher.

After graduating in 1951, he went into the United States Army and served for two years at Fort Lee, where he was twice named All-Army and set a rushing record for the Fort in 1953.

== Playing career ==
On January 25, 1954, he signed a contract with the Philadelphia Eagles. He played in 5 exhibition games, but suffered a knee injury and was waived on September 7. He signed a baseball contract with the Pittsburgh Pirates organization and attended their spring training following his NFL rookie season.

On March 3, 1955, he signed with the BC Lions of the Canadian Football League, where he was a starter. He played in seven games, registering 5 carries for 33 yards.

In July 1956, he signed with the New York Giants, but broke his leg in six places during spring drills and was placed on the injured reserve list. On June 21, 1957, he signed with the Ottawa Roughriders of the Canadian Football League. He was released on August 14.

== Coaching career ==
Garrett began his coaching career in the United States Army, serving as athletic director at Quartermaster Center and School at Fort Lee, from 1952 until his discharge in May 1954. He was named the football head coach at Pawling High School on September 8, 1955. In 1957, he began coaching football at the United States Coast Guard Academy, where he also was an assistant director of athletics, while helping with the basketball and baseball coaching.

In June 1959, he was hired as an assistant football coach at Lehigh University. In July 1960, he was named the athletic director and head football coach at Susquehanna University. He also coached the baseball team from 1962 to 1965 and guided the track and field team in 1961. He led the football team to a 39–11–1 record, which included undefeated seasons in 1961 and 1962. He was fired during the seventh game of the 1965 season for assaulting a player. Gustave Weber replaced Garrett as head coach and led Susquehanna to two losses, both against non-conference opponents, the team finished the season 0–9 overall. In 1968, he assumed the head coach position for the Orlando Panthers of the Continental Football League.

He spent most of the next 40 years in the National Football League as an assistant coach with the New York Giants (1970–1973), the New Orleans Saints (1976–1977), and the Cleveland Browns (1978–1984). He was named vice president and head coach of the Houston Texans of the fledgling World Football League, from April 1974 until the team's collapse and location move during the month of October.

On May 14, 1975, he was named the football head coach at Millburn High School in New Jersey, where he had a brief stint. On December 27, 1984, he was named the head coach at Columbia University, taking over a program that had won only five of its last 63 contests and had one winning season since 1963. His time in the school was fraught with controversy, and was forced to resign as the team went 0–10, among accusations of verbal and physical abuse. After the season, his sons John, Jason and Judd, who were enrolled at Columbia, transferred to Princeton University.

== Scouting career ==
Garrett served from 1966 to 1967 as a talent scout for the Blesto 9 scouting service. He scouted for the Dallas Cowboys during three periods of time: 1968–1969, 1974–1975 and 1987–2003. As a college scout for the Cowboys, he wrote the original scouting report on quarterback Troy Aikman and famously pushed for the team to draft wide receiver Randy Moss. In 1986, he scouted for the Buffalo Bills.

== Personal life ==
Garrett and his wife Jane (née Lentz) were the parents of eight children. His sons John, Jason and Judd coached in the NFL. Jason previously played and coached for the Dallas Cowboys, John is the head coach at Lafayette College, Judd is a front office executive with the Cowboys, and Jim III teaches high school English at University School.

Garrett owned a beach house in New Jersey where he set up a makeshift practice field in his backyard, which he would use as an opportunity to teach the sport to his family members and other players in the nearby area. There have been reports in the media that there would be upwards of 20 people at a given time being mentored by him. Some of these individuals included NFL players Sam Mills, Miles Austin, Harry Flaherty Sr., Dino Hall, Bill Hill, Ethan Brooks and Darian Barnes.

Garrett ran 2.5 miles every single day for 25 years without missing a day, until suffering a serious stroke in September 2012. He died at the age of 87 on February 9, 2018.

== Legacy ==
Garrett was inducted into the Susquehanna University Sports Hall of Fame in 1981. He was part of the inaugural class inducted into the Rutherford High School's Athletic Hall of Fame in 1996. In 2001, Susquehanna University named their athletic complex building in his honor as the James W. Garrett Sports Complex. In 2018, he was inducted posthumously into the Middle Atlantic Conference Sports Hall of Fame.

== Head coaching record ==
Year	Team	Overall	Conference	Standing	Bowl/playoffs
Susquehanna Crusaders (Middle Atlantic Conference) (1960–1965)
1960	Susquehanna	7–1	5–1	4th (Northern College)	
1961	Susquehanna	8–0–1	6–0	1st (Northern College)	
1962	Susquehanna	9–0	5–0	1st (Northern College)	
1963	Susquehanna	8–1	2–1	NA (Northern College)	
1964	Susquehanna	7–2	2–0	NA (Northern College)	
1965	Susquehanna	0–7	0–3	NA (Northern College)	
Susquehanna:		39–11–1	20–5		
Columbia Lions (Ivy League) (1985)
1985	Columbia	0–10	0–7	8th	
Columbia:		0–10	0–7		
Total:		39–21–1			
National championship Conference title Conference division title or championship game berth
