= Bob Kap =

Personal information
- Born: 10 June 1923; Skopje, Kingdom of Serbs, Croats and Slovenes
- Died: 14 March 2010 (aged 86); Ottawa, Ontario, Canada

Career information
- College: University of Budapest

Career history
- Houston Oilers (1973) Kicking coach

Bob Kap
Personal information
- Position: Outside right

Senior career*
Years	Team	Apps	(Gls)
- Gragjanski
- Vardar Skopje
- Vasas Budapest
- SC Levski
- CSKA Sofia

Managerial career
- 1951–1953: DNA Plovdiv
- 1967–1968: Dallas Tornado
- * Club domestic league appearances and goals

Bob Kap (June 10, 1923 – March 14, 2010), also known as Robert Kapoustin and Božidar or Bojidar Nikolaiovich Kapusto, or the Hungarian version Boldizsar Kapusztin was a Yugoslav-Canadian association football (soccer) and American football coach who was a pioneer in introducing "soccer-style" kicking to the gridiron game.

== Soccer ==
Born in present-day North Macedonia while it was part of the Kingdom of Yugoslavia, Kap obtained a law degree at the University of Belgrade and played professional football in Europe before moving to Toronto after the 1956 Hungarian Revolution. In North America, he worked as writer-editor for the magazine Soccer Illustrated and published the North America and World Soccer News. He is also described as having coached in Montreal, Quebec.

In his capacity as a journalist, Kap corresponded with trailblazing sports promoter Lamar Hunt, owner of the fledgling North American Soccer League side Dallas Tornado, and learned that the club needed a head coach for the 1968 season. Kap told Hunt that he had studied alongside Hungarian footballing legend Ferenc Puskas at the national academy in that country and, more dubiously, that he had played for English club Manchester United.

On July 21, 1967 Dallas media reported that Kap had been contracted since June 1 as Tornado head coach and that his qualifications included having graduated as a specialist coach at the University of Budapest coaching school in Hungary. Kap then spent several months in Europe to scout for players and took the team on an Odyssean seven-month world tour in 1967–68, beginning in August in Madrid and involving 45 games in 26 countries. Kap kept a journal of the trip which included Saigon during the Vietnam War.

After the team's return to the United States, they made a pre-season trip to Costa Rica and Honduras, but following a poor start to the 1968 NASL season Kap was replaced as coach by Keith Spurgeon on June 8 after a 3–2 loss to the Chicago Sting. He was not known to have coached professionally again.

== American football ==
Kap is credited with recommending the Austrian footballer Toni Fritsch to the National Football League and the Dallas Cowboys, where Fritsch became a successful placekicker. In 1973, he worked as a kicking coach for the Houston Oilers. Overall, Kap claimed to have placed nine European kickers in the NFL.

In 1974, Kap was involved in plans for six European cities to play in the Intercontinental Football League under American football rules. The competition did not take place but is cited as having helped set the stage for the eventual NFL Europe. Kap devoted more time to painting in his retirement, and one of his paintings hangs at the Pro Football Hall of Fame in Canton, Ohio.

== Later life and family ==
Kap received the key to the city of Dallas from mayor Erik Jonsson at an unknown date (Jonsson became mayor in 1964).

In 1978, Kap fronted a bid to bring Argentine World Cup star Ricky Villa to the United States, but Villa moved to Tottenham Hotspur in England along international teammate Ossie Ardiles instead.

Kap's son Michael Kapoustin is reported as having grown up in Toronto and Vancouver, British Columbia. Michael continued to live in BC before being arrested in Germany in 1996 and extradited to Bulgaria to spend time in prison for fraud. He maintained his innocence and the Dallas sports columnist Gene Wilson wrote a book on his situation before the Canadian government successfully pushed for his release in 2008.
