= Bernie Kukar =

American football official (born 1940)

- Born: May 15, 1940 (age 84); Gilbert, Minnesota, U.S.
- Occupation: NFL official (1984–2005)

Bernie Kukar (born May 15, 1940) is an American former football official in the National Football League (NFL) for 22 seasons from the 1984 to the 2005 season. He wore uniform number 86.

He was born and raised in Gilbert, Minnesota and later attended college at Saint John's University in Collegeville, Minnesota where he graduated in 1962. He played football at Saint John's under John Gagliardi, the all-time winningest coach in collegiate football history. Bernie played defensive back on defense and quarterback on offense, but was later moved to running back. He also returned punts and kicks.

Kukar officiated four years at the high school level, and a total of 19 years at the college level with four years at Division III, 11 years at Division II, and four years in the Big Ten Conference (Division I). He began his NFL officiating career in 1984 as a back judge. After the first regular season of the World League of American Football (WLAF, later NFL Europe) in spring of 1991, he was appointed referee of World Bowl '91 in London.

After seven years in the NFL, Kukar was promoted to referee at the start of the 1991 NFL season, which came after the retirement of the "Dean of Referees", Jim Tunney and the promotion of Jerry Seeman to the Director of Officiating in the NFL office.

He was selected to officiate in the Super Bowl twice, Super Bowl XXXIII in 1999, and Super Bowl XXXVI in 2002. He was also an alternate in Super Bowl XXX in 1996.
