= Phil Alexander =

English footballer and executive (born 1962)

Personal information
- Full name: Philip James Alexander
- Date of birth: 4 September 1962 (age 64)
- Place of birth: Slough, England

Youth career
- Reading

Senior career*
Years	Team	Apps	(Gls)
1980–1981	Wokingham Town		
1981–1983	Norwich City	1	(0)
1983–1985	Miramar Rangers		
1986–1990	Wokingham Town		
1992	Bracknell Town		

International career
	England U19	5	

Managerial career
- 1992–1994: Bracknell Town
- * Club domestic league appearances and goals

Philip James Alexander (born 4 September 1962) is an English former association footballer and American football player. He is currently chief executive officer of the National League.

== Association football ==
Alexander's English football career began at Reading. Alexander then joined amateur Wokingham Town, before signing for Norwich City for £2,000 in 1981.

== American football ==
In 1990, Alexander was invited to a tryout at the Chicago Bears' minicamp after writing a letter to the special teams coordinator, Steve Kazor. He then played for the Farnham Knights and London Monarchs as a placekicker. In the Monarchs first year, Anderson was "Operation Discovery Player of the year", was voted to the All-World League team and was the first Brit to get his hands on the World Bowl trophy.

== Executive career ==
Alexander was appointed chief executive of Crystal Palace in 1996, In December 2022 he was appointed CEO at Bristol City. He stepped down on 18 September 2023.

In November 2025, Alexander was appointed chief executive of the National League.
