= London Monarchs =

Professional American football franchise based in the UK

Logo

General information
- Founded: 1991
- Folded: 1998
- Headquartered: London, England
- Colors: London: Red, Metallic Gold, Royal Blue, White; England: Red, Royal Blue, White

League / conference affiliations
- World League of American Football (NFL Europe)

Championships
- World Bowls: 1 World Bowl I (1991)

The London Monarchs were a professional American football team in NFL Europe and its predecessor league, the World League of American Football (WLAF). The Monarchs played their final season in 1998 as the England Monarchs. In 1999, they were replaced by the new Berlin Thunder.

== Early years ==
The WLAF operated in 1991 and 1992 and included ten teams: six from the US, one from Canada, and three European-based teams (including the Monarchs), which were organised into three divisions (North American West, North American East, and European Divisions). The WLAF suspended operations prior to the 1993 season, but was revived in 1995 as the World League, featuring six European-based teams, again including the Monarchs. The World League was renamed "NFL Europe League" in 1998. This league played its games in the spring so as not to conflict with the traditional American football season of autumn and early winter.

In 1991 and 1992 the Monarchs played their home games at the famed Wembley Stadium. In the 1991 season the team won the first World Bowl at Wembley, beating the Barcelona Dragons 21–0, the only team to have beaten them in the entire season. In the first season of the World League, crowds at Wembley averaged 40,483 over the five games played. However dwindling interest – even with the advent of a new regional rivalry with the Edinburgh-based Scottish Claymores – forced the team to shift its home ground to White Hart Lane, home of Tottenham Hotspur F.C., when the league resumed play in 1995, and that year average attendance fell to 16,343.

Because of the comparatively small size of the pitch at White Hart Lane, special dispensation had to be applied for to use a shortened field which was granted: the pitch at White Hart Lane measured 93 yards (as opposed to the standard 100 yards in American football, 120 including both 10-yard endzones). In 1996, the Monarchs were forced to find an alternative venue for their final home game and chose Stamford Bridge, where they would play all of their home games in 1997.

== England Monarchs ==
Towards the end of the 1997 season, the WLAF was starting to re-evaluate the team's situation in its market, believing that the return to London had not been as big a success as hoped. In conjunction with general manager Alton Byrd, the team was rebranded the England Monarchs and travelled the country, playing home games at the Crystal Palace National Sports Centre in London, Ashton Gate (home of Bristol City F.C.) and Alexander Stadium, an athletics stadium in Birmingham – another step down in the size and quality of the stadiums used. This venture divided opinion dramatically amongst Monarchs supporters, and rather than increase interest in the team, attendances slumped to an average of 5,944. The announcement at the end of the 1998 season that the league would add a new team, the Berlin Thunder, led to weeks of speculation that either one of the existing teams would be shut down, or that the Monarchs and Claymores would be amalgamated into a single British team. Confirmation that the Monarchs were to close down came in July that year.

== Players ==
Like other WLAF/NFL Europe teams, most of the Monarchs' players were young American developmental players assigned from teams in the National Football League. The league paid these players' salaries, as well of that of the coaches, who tended also to be Americans, though there were exceptions – in the early years Walter McKone, D.O. was a team osteopath and Stewart Parkinson a team manager. A few players of European extraction also participated, primarily as kicking specialists, although league rules required the participation of at least one player of European extraction on every other series of four downs. The league's points leader in 1991 was Phil Alexander, kicker with the Monarchs, who is currently Chief Executive of Bristol City football club. One exception to the "kicker phenomenon" was Victor Ebubedike (later Victor X Ebubedike, and later still Victor Muhammad) who played as running back for the Monarchs for a number of years, and who became the first European to score a touchdown in the WLAF (versus the Orlando Thunder) in 1991.

Notable players for the Monarchs included Stan Gelbaugh, William "The Refrigerator" Perry, Jon Horton, Dana Brinson, Greg Horne, Marlon "Space Dog" Brown, Obafemi Ayanbadejo, Doug Marrone, Danny Crossman, Steve "Hollywood" Brooks, Judd Garrett (one of three brothers to play in the league, with Jason and John both being San Antonio Riders), Kevin "Roly Poly" O'Brien, Tim Simpson, former QPR & Tottenham Hotspur player Clive Allen and Brad Johnson, a quarterback who would go on to win Super Bowl XXXVII with the Tampa Bay Buccaneers. Also of note was Dedrick Dodge, a defensive back who went on to win Super Bowl rings with the San Francisco 49ers and the Denver Broncos, and LaVar Ball, a tight end whose sons now play basketball, including Lonzo Ball of the Chicago Bulls, who was the second overall pick in the 2017 NBA draft, and Charlotte Hornets point guard and NBA Rookie of the year 2020 Lamelo Ball.

== Season-by-season ==
Season	League	Regular season					Postseason			
Season	League	Won	Lost	Ties	Win %	Finish	Won	Lost	Win %	Result
London Monarchs
1991	WLAF	9	1	0	.900	1st (European)	2	0	1.000	World Bowl '91 champions
1992	WLAF	2	7	1	.250	3rd (European)	—	—	—	Out of playoffs.
1993	WLAF suspended operations from 1993 to 1994									
1994	WLAF suspended operations from 1993 to 1994									
1995	WLAF	4	6	0	.400	4th (League)	—	—	—	Out of playoffs.
1996	WLAF	4	6	0	.400	5th (League)	—	—	—	Out of playoffs.
1997	WLAF	4	6	0	.400	6th (League)	—	—	—	Out of playoffs.
England Monarchs
1998	NFLE	3	7	0	.300	5th (League)	—	—	—	Out of playoffs.
Total		26	33	1	.442		2	0	1.000	

== Head coaches ==
No.	Name	Term	Regular season					Postseason				Achievements
No.	Name	Term	GC	Won	Lost	Ties	Win %	GC	Won	Lost	Win %	Achievements
1	Larry Kennan	1991	10	9	1	0	.900	2	2	0	1.000	World Bowl '91 championship World League Coach of the Year
2	Ray Willsey	1992	10	2	7	1	.250	—	—	—	—	—
3	Bobby Hammond	1995–1996	12	4	8	0	.333	—	—	—	—	—
4	Lionel Taylor	1996–1998	28	11	17	0	.393	—	—	—	—	—
