= 1991 WLAF season =

- Duration: March 23, 1991 – May 27, 1991

World Bowl '91
- Date: June 9, 1991
- Venue: Wembley Stadium, London
- Champions: London Monarchs

WLAF seasons seasons
- 1992

The 1991 WLAF season was the inaugural season of the World League of American Football and was the first transatlantic sports league. The regular season began on March 23, and concluded on May 27. The postseason ran from June 1 until June 9, when the London Monarchs defeated the Barcelona Dragons 21–0 in World Bowl '91 at Wembley Stadium in London, England.

== Attendances ==
Average game attendance was 25,361. At London, Barcelona, Frankfurt and Montreal, attendances surpassed early expectations. The Monarchs' home attendance led the league, with an average of 40,481 in the regular season. The dress rehearsal for the World Bowl, London v Barcelona at Wembley in week 10, attracted 50,835 fans, while the same week Frankfurt v Sacramento received a bigger crowd, 51,653, with around 10,000 more fans turned away. The World Bowl was attended by 61,108.

== Regular season ==
=== Week 1 ===
Date	Visiting team	Final score	Home team	Source
Saturday, March 23	London Monarchs	24–11	Frankfurt Galaxy	
Saturday, March 23	Raleigh–Durham Skyhawks	3–9	Sacramento Surge	
Saturday, March 23	Montreal Machine	20–5	Birmingham Fire	
Sunday, March 24	New York/New Jersey Knights	7–19	Barcelona Dragons	
Monday, March 25	San Antonio Riders	34–35	Orlando Thunder	

=== Week 2 ===
Date	Visiting team	Final score	Home team	Source
Saturday, March 30	Sacramento Surge	10–17	Birmingham Fire	
Saturday, March 30	Raleigh–Durham Skyhawks	20–58	Orlando Thunder	
Sunday, March 31	New York/New Jersey Knights	18–22	London Monarchs	
Monday, April 1	Frankfurt Galaxy	10–3	San Antonio Riders	
Monday, April 1	Barcelona Dragons	34–10	Montreal Machine	

=== Week 3 ===
Date	Visiting team	Final score	Home team	Source
Saturday, April 6	Orlando Thunder	12–35	London Monarchs	
Saturday, April 6	Barcelona Dragons	26–14	Raleigh–Durham Skyhawks	
Saturday, April 6	Frankfurt Galaxy	27–17	New York/New Jersey Knights	
Sunday, April 7	Sacramento Surge	3–10	San Antonio Riders	
Monday, April 8	Birmingham Fire	10–23	Montreal Machine	

=== Week 4 ===
Date	Visiting team	Final score	Home team	Source
Saturday, April 13	Frankfurt Galaxy	10–16	Sacramento Surge	
Saturday, April 13	New York/New Jersey Knights	44–0	Montreal Machine	
Sunday, April 14	Orlando Thunder	13–33	Barcelona Dragons	
Monday, April 15	San Antonio Riders	37–15	Raleigh–Durham Skyhawks	
Monday, April 15	London Monarchs	27–0	Birmingham Fire	

=== Week 5 ===
Date	Visiting team	Final score	Home team	Source
Saturday, April 20	Montreal Machine	7–45	London Monarchs	
Saturday, April 20	Raleigh–Durham Skyhawks	28–30	Frankfurt Galaxy	
Saturday, April 20	Barcelona Dragons	14–22	San Antonio Riders	
Sunday, April 21	Birmingham Fire	31–6	Orlando Thunder	
Monday, April 22	Sacramento Surge	20–28	New York/New Jersey Knights	

=== Week 6 ===
Date	Visiting team	Final score	Home team	Source
Saturday, April 27	Montreal Machine	7–17	Frankfurt Galaxy	
Saturday, April 27	Barcelona Dragons	29–20	Sacramento Surge	
Saturday, April 27	Orlando Thunder	6–42	New York/New Jersey Knights	
Sunday, April 28	Raleigh–Durham Skyhawks	10–35	London Monarchs	
Monday, April 29	San Antonio Riders	12–16	Birmingham Fire	

=== Week 7 ===
Date	Visiting team	Final score	Home team	Source
Saturday, May 4	Birmingham Fire	6–11	Barcelona Dragons	
Saturday, May 4	Frankfurt Galaxy	17–14	Orlando Thunder	
Saturday, May 4	Montreal Machine	26–23	Sacramento Surge	
Sunday, May 5	New York/New Jersey Knights	42–6	Raleigh–Durham Skyhawks	
Monday, May 6	London Monarchs	38–15	San Antonio Riders	

=== Week 8 ===
Date	Visiting team	Final score	Home team	Source
Saturday, May 11	San Antonio Riders	7–17	Barcelona Dragons	
Saturday, May 11	London Monarchs	22–7	New York/New Jersey Knights	
Saturday, May 11	Sacramento Surge	33–45	Orlando Thunder	
Sunday, May 12	Birmingham Fire	3–10	Frankfurt Galaxy	
Monday, May 13	Raleigh–Durham Skyhawks	6–15	Montreal Machine	

=== Week 9 ===
Date	Visiting team	Final score	Home team	Source
Saturday, May 18	Montreal Machine	10–27	San Antonio Riders	
Saturday, May 18	London Monarchs	45–21	Sacramento Surge	
Sunday, May 19	Frankfurt Galaxy	10–3	Barcelona Dragons	
Monday, May 20	Orlando Thunder	20–14	Raleigh–Durham Skyhawks	
Monday, May 20	New York/New Jersey Knights	14–24	Birmingham Fire	

=== Week 10 ===
Date	Visiting team	Final score	Home team	Source
Saturday, May 25	Sacramento Surge	24–13	Frankfurt Galaxy	
Saturday, May 25	Birmingham Fire	28–7	Raleigh–Durham Skyhawks	
Saturday, May 25	San Antonio Riders	9–38	New York/New Jersey Knights	
Monday, May 27	Barcelona Dragons	20–17	London Monarchs	
Monday, May 27	Orlando Thunder	33–27	Montreal Machine	

== Standings ==
European Division
Team	W	L	T	PCT	PF	PA	DIV	STK
London Monarchs	9	1	0	.900	310	121	1–1	L1
Barcelona Dragons	8	2	0	.800	206	126	1–1	W1
Frankfurt Galaxy	7	3	0	.700	155	139	1–1	L1

North American East Division
Team	W	L	T	PCT	PF	PA	DIV	STK
New York/New Jersey Knights	5	5	0	.500	257	155	3–0	W1
Orlando Thunder	5	5	0	.500	242	286	3–1	W3
Montreal Machine	4	6	0	.400	145	244	1–2	L2
Raleigh–Durham Skyhawks	0	10	0	.000	123	300	0–4	L10

North American West Division
Team	W	L	T	PCT	PF	PA	DIV	STK
Birmingham Fire	5	5	0	.500	140	140	2–0	W2
San Antonio Riders	4	6	0	.400	176	196	1–1	L1
Sacramento Surge	3	7	0	.300	179	226	0–2	W1

== Postseason ==
=== Bracket ===
Semifinals
1	London Monarchs	42
4	New York/New Jersey Knights	26
3	Barcelona Dragons	10
2	Birmingham Fire	3

World Bowl '91
London Monarchs	21
Barcelona Dragons	0

== All-World League team ==
=== Offense ===
Position	First team	Second team
Wide receiver	Jon Horton, London; Gene Taylor, Barcelona; Byron Williams, Orlando	Dana Brinson, London; Monty Gilbreath, NY/NJ; Carl Parker, Sacramento
Tackle	Steve Gabbard, London; Mike Withycombe, Orlando	Scott Adams, Barcelona; Theo Adams, London
Guard	Paul Berardelli, London; Gary Frank, Frankfurt	John Guerrero, Orlando; Barry Voorhees, Barcelona
Center	Doug Marrone, London	Curtis Wilson, Sacramento
Quarterback	Stan Gelbaugh, London	Scott Erney, Barcelona
Running back	Tony Baker, Frankfurt; Ricky Blake, San Antonio	Judd Garrett, London; Eric Mitchel, Orlando; Eric Wilkerson, NY/NJ

=== Defense ===
Position	First team	Second team
Defensive end	Bruce Clark, Barcelona; Mark Mraz, Frankfurt	Donnie Gardner, San Antonio; Shawn Knight, Sacramento
Nose tackle	Roy Hart, London	Darrell Phillips, Birmingham; Mike Teeter, Frankfurt
Outside linebacker	Danny Lockett, London; Tracy Simien, Montreal	Marlon Brown, London; Ron Sancho, NY/NJ
Inside linebacker	John Brantley, Birmingham; Tim Walton, San Antonio	Ron Goetz, Barcelona; Pete Najarian, Sacramento; Ken Sale, London
Cornerback	Anthony Parker, NY/NJ; Corris Ervin, London	John Holland, Birmingham; Richard Shelton, Montreal
Strong safety	Greg Coauette, Sacramento	Tim Broady, Frankfurt
Free safety	John Miller, Birmingham	Dedrick Dodge, London

=== Specialists ===
Position	First team	Second team
Kicker	Phil Alexander, London	Björn Nittmo, Montreal
Punter	Chris Mohr, Montreal	Kirk Maggio, Birmingham
Special teams	Erroll Tucker, Orlando (PR)	Richard Shelton, Montreal (PR)
Operation Discovery	Phil Alexander, London	Victor Ebubedike, London
