= World Bowl '91 =

1991 WLAF Championship game

Barcelona Dragons	London Monarchs
0	21
	1	2	3	4	Total
BAR	0	0	0	0	0
LON	7	14	0	0	21
- Date: Sunday, June 9, 1991
- Stadium: Wembley Stadium; London, England
- MVP: Dan Crossman, Safety
- Referee: Bernie Kukar
- Attendance: 61,108

TV in the United States
- Network: ABC
- Announcers: Brent Musburger and Dick Vermeil

World Bowl '91 (also referred to as World Bowl I) was the first annual World Bowl, the championship game of the World League of American Football. It took place on June 9, 1991 at London's Wembley Stadium. The game featured a matchup between the Barcelona Dragons and the London Monarchs. The Monarchs won 21–0 in front of 61,108 fans.

== Background ==
The teams finished the 1991 season with the two best records in the WLAF. The Monarchs' 9–1 mark qualified them for the playoffs as European division champions, while the Dragons finished 8–2 and qualified as a wildcard. The Monarchs' only blemish on their record came at the hands of the Dragons, 20–17, at Wembley Stadium in the last week of the regular season.

For both of the Europe-based finalists, the road to the World Bowl went through North America. The Dragons travelled to Birmingham and knocked off the Birmingham Fire (North American West champions), 10–3, while the Monarchs stopped North American East champion New York-New Jersey, 42–26. (Despite having a better record than the Knights, the semifinal game was held at Giants Stadium due to a scheduling conflict with an association football match at Wembley Stadium).

The two starting quarterbacks, Barcelona's Scott Erney and London's Stan Gelbaugh, knew each other well: they played high school football less than five minutes away from each other, at Mechanicsburg Area Senior High and Cumberland Valley High School, respectively.

== Game summary ==
Barcelona started the game with excellent field position, as London wide receiver Dana Brinson fumbled the opening kickoff, and the Dragons took over on the Monarchs 18-yard line. However, the Monarchs defense shut down the Dragons offense, and London recovered a muffed field goal attempt (the first of 6 Dragon turnovers on the day). The teams traded possessions, with London taking over just before the end of the first quarter. Monarchs quarterback Stan Gelbaugh, who had finished the season as the league's offensive MVP, hit Jon Horton with a 59-yard touchdown pass to give the Monarchs a 7–0 lead at the close of the 1st quarter. On the Dragons' next possession, quarterback Scott Erney was intercepted by Dan Crossman, who returned his second pick of the game for a touchdown. Crossman would add another interception later in the second quarter, setting up a 14-yard pass from Gelbaugh to Judd Garrett, giving London a 21–0 lead and all the offense it would need.

Barcelona tried, but could not come back in the second half, as the hometown Monarchs won in front of a raucous London crowd. The crowd was also treated late in the game by the entry of running back Victor Ebubedike, born in London and a member of the Monarchs as per WLAF rules; he would gain 3 yards on his only carry of the game.

The Monarchs' win turned out to be the only shutout in World Bowl history. Judd Garrett finished the day with 13 receptions, a World Bowl record that would never be surpassed. Dan Crossman's 3 interceptions easily earned him the World Bowl MVP award.

Scoring summary

Quarter	Time	Drive			Team	Scoring information	Score	
Quarter	Time	Plays	Yards	TOP	Team	Scoring information	Barcelona	London
1	0:00	4	80		London	Jon Horton 59-yard touchdown reception from Stan Gelbaugh, Phil Alexander kick good	0	7
2	11:18	1	20		London	Interception returned 20 yards for touchdown by Dan Crossman, Phil Alexander kick good	0	14
2	0:43	9	55		London	Judd Garrett 14-yard touchdown reception from Stan Gelbaugh, Phil Alexander kick good	0	21
"TOP" = time of possession. For other American football terms, see Glossary of American football.							0	21
