= World Bowl =

Championship of the WLAF/NFL Europe

The World Bowl was the annual American football championship game of the World League of American Football, later called NFL Europe. The World Bowl was played each year from 1991 to 2007 (except 1993 and 1994).

The first World Bowl was played in 1991 in London. With the 1995 relaunch of the World League with the North American teams removed, all subsequent World Bowls were played in Europe between European clubs. The only World Bowl to take place outside Europe was World Bowl '92 in Montreal, Canada.

The World Bowl trophy was a globe made of glass measuring 35.5 cm (14 inches) in diameter and weighing 18.6 kg (41 lbs).

== Overview ==
When the World League of American Football (WLAF) was founded in 1991, with teams in North America and Europe as well as expansion plans for Asia, the name World Bowl was appropriate. The name was kept after 1995 when the league limited itself exclusively to Europe.

From 1995 to 1997, the World Bowl venue was decided by the standings after five weeks of the 10-week season. In other years, the sites were predetermined before the season. The 2002 World Bowl was hosted in Rhein Fire's hometown of Düsseldorf as a farewell to the old Rheinstadion. After the new LTU Arena (now Merkur Spiel-Arena) was completed, the 2005 World Bowl was hosted there again. It would return in 2006, the first time that the game was played in the same site in consecutive years. As the city's Fortuna Düsseldorf team spent much of this time in lower tiers of the German soccer pyramid, Düsseldorf was the rare NFL Europe city in which American football held an arguably competitive position.

Nine World Bowls were played on Saturdays and six World Bowls were played on Sundays (1991, 1996–1999, 2000).

== World Bowl (WLAF, NFL Europe, and NFL Europa Championships) ==
Date		Winner	Score	Runner-Up	MVP	Venue	Attendance	Refs.
June 9, 1991	World Bowl '91	(United Kingdom) London Monarchs	21 – 0	(Spain) Barcelona Dragons	Dan Crossman; Monarchs, Safety	Wembley Stadium, London, United Kingdom	61,108	
June 6, 1992	World Bowl '92	(United States) Sacramento Surge	21 – 17	(United States) Orlando Thunder	David Archer; Surge, QB	Olympic Stadium, Montreal, Canada	43,789	
1993	League suspended							
1994	League suspended							
June 17, 1995	World Bowl '95	(Germany) Frankfurt Galaxy	26 – 22	(Netherlands) Amsterdam Admirals	Paul Justin; Galaxy, QB	Olympisch Stadion, Amsterdam, Netherlands	23,847	
June 23, 1996	World Bowl '96	(United Kingdom) Scottish Claymores	32 – 27	(Germany) Frankfurt Galaxy	Yo Murphy; Claymores, WR	Murrayfield Stadium, Edinburgh, United Kingdom	38,982	
June 22, 1997	World Bowl '97	(Spain) Barcelona Dragons	38 – 24	(Germany) Rhein Fire	Jon Kitna; Dragons, QB	Estadi Olimpic, Barcelona, Spain	31,100	
June 14, 1998	World Bowl '98	(Germany) Rhein Fire	34 – 10	(Germany) Frankfurt Galaxy	Jim Arellanes; Fire, QB	Waldstadion, Frankfurt, Germany	47,846	
June 27, 1999	World Bowl '99	(Germany) Frankfurt Galaxy	38 – 24	(Spain) Barcelona Dragons	Andy McCullough; Galaxy, WR	Rheinstadion, Düsseldorf, Germany	39,643	
June 25, 2000	World Bowl 2000	(Germany) Rhein Fire	13 – 10	(United Kingdom) Scottish Claymores	Aaron Stecker; Claymores, RB	Waldstadion, Frankfurt, Germany	35,860	
June 30, 2001	World Bowl IX	(Germany) Berlin Thunder	24 – 17	(Spain) Barcelona Dragons	Jonathan Quinn; Thunder, QB	Amsterdam ArenA, Amsterdam, Netherlands	32,116	
June 22, 2002	World Bowl X	(Germany) Berlin Thunder	26 – 20	(Germany) Rhein Fire	Dane Looker; Thunder, WR	Rheinstadion, Düsseldorf, Germany	53,109	
June 14, 2003	World Bowl XI	(Germany) Frankfurt Galaxy	35 – 16	(Germany) Rhein Fire	Jonas Lewis; Galaxy, RB	Hampden Park, Glasgow, United Kingdom	28,138	
June 12, 2004	World Bowl XII	(Germany) Berlin Thunder	30 – 24	(Germany) Frankfurt Galaxy	Eric McCoo; Thunder, RB	Arena AufSchalke, Gelsenkirchen, Germany	35,413	
June 11, 2005	World Bowl XIII	(Netherlands) Amsterdam Admirals	27 – 21	(Germany) Berlin Thunder	Kurt Kittner; Admirals, QB	LTU arena, Düsseldorf, Germany	35,134	
May 27, 2006	World Bowl XIV	(Germany) Frankfurt Galaxy	22 – 7	(Netherlands) Amsterdam Admirals	Butchie Wallace; Galaxy, RB	LTU arena, Düsseldorf, Germany	36,286	
June 23, 2007	World Bowl XV	(Germany) Hamburg Sea Devils	37 – 28	(Germany) Frankfurt Galaxy	Casey Bramlet; Sea Devils, QB	Commerzbank-Arena, Frankfurt, Germany	48,125	

- Note: Roman numerals were not officially used by NFL Europe until World Bowl IX. Before 2001, the games were titled with the current year, such as World Bowl 2000.

=== Team records ===
Team	Won	Played	Winning years	Runner-up years
(Germany) Frankfurt Galaxy	4	8	1995, 1999, 2003, 2006	1996, 1998, 2004, 2007
(Germany) Berlin Thunder	3	4	2001, 2002, 2004	2005
(Germany) Rhein Fire	2	5	1998, 2000	1997, 2002, 2003
(Spain) Barcelona Dragons	1	4	1997	1991, 1999, 2001
(Netherlands) Amsterdam Admirals	1	3	2005	1995, 2006
(United Kingdom) Scottish Claymores	1	2	1996	2000
(Germany) Hamburg Sea Devils	1	1	2007	
(United Kingdom) London Monarchs	1	1	1991	
(United States) Sacramento Surge	1	1	1992	
(United States) Orlando Thunder	0	1		1992
(Germany) Cologne Centurions	0	0		
(United States) Birmingham Fire	0	0		
(United States) San Antonio Riders	0	0		
(Canada) Montreal Machine	0	0		
(United States) New York/New Jersey Knights	0	0		
(United States) Raleigh–Durham Skyhawks	0	0		
(United States) Ohio Glory	0	0		

=== Results by country ===
Team	Won	Played
Germany	10	18
United Kingdom	2	3
Spain	1	4
Netherlands	1	3
United States	1	2
Canada	0	0

=== Hosting cities ===
City	No. hosted	Years hosted
Düsseldorf	4	1999, 2002, 2005, 2006
Frankfurt	3	1998, 2000, 2007
Amsterdam	2	1995, 2001
London	1	1991
Montreal	1	1992
Edinburgh	1	1996
Barcelona	1	1997
Glasgow	1	2003
Gelsenkirchen	1	2004

While the Olympic stadiums in Montreal, Amsterdam and Barcelona hosted World Bowls, the league never selected Berlin as a host town, though the city's Thunder played in the Olympiastadion from 2003 to 2007.

== Other uses of "World Bowl" ==
The former World Football League, a short-lived 1970s competitor to the NFL, was the first to name its championship game the World Bowl. In World Bowl I, the only WFL World Bowl contested, the Birmingham Americans defeated the Florida Blazers 22–21 on December 5, 1974, at Legion Field in Birmingham, Alabama. The game had been scheduled to be played at the Gator Bowl Stadium in Jacksonville, Florida, but after the Jacksonville Sharks folded mid-season, the league decided that the team with the better record would host the game.

The proposed World Indoor Football League that was to begin play in 1988 also intended on calling its championship the World Bowl. It would have been played on August 29, 1988. However, the WIFL disbanded 11 days before its season was to begin.
