= NFL Europe =

Defunct professional American football league

- Formerly: World League of American Football (1991); World League (1992, 1995–97); NFL Europa (2007)
- Sport: American football
- Founded: July 19, 1989; 37 years ago
- First season: 1991
- Folded: June 29, 2007; 19 years ago
- Divisions: 3 (1991–1992)
- No. of teams: 10 (1991–1992); 6 (1995–2007)
- Countries: United States (1991–92); Canada (1991–92); Germany (1991–92, 1995–2007); Netherlands (1995–2007); Spain (1991–92, 1995–2003); United Kingdom (1991–92)
- Last champion: Hamburg Sea Devils (1)
- Most titles: Frankfurt Galaxy (4)
- Related competitions: National Football League

The NFL Europe League (simply called NFL Europe and known in its final season as NFL Europa) was a professional American football league that functioned as the developmental minor league of the National Football League (NFL). Originally founded in 1989 as the World League of American Football (or WLAF), the league was envisioned as a transatlantic league encompassing teams from both North America and Europe. Initially, the WLAF consisted of seven teams in North America and three in Europe. It began play in 1991 and lasted for two seasons before suspending operations; while the league had been "wildly popular" in Europe, it failed to achieve success in North America. After a two-year hiatus, it returned as a six-team European league, with teams based in England, Germany, the Netherlands, Scotland, and Spain. NFL Europa was dissolved in 2007 due to its continued unprofitability and the NFL's decision to shift its focus towards hosting regular-season games in Europe; at the time of its closure, the league consisted of five German teams and one team based in the Netherlands.

The league operated under rules nearly identical to the NFL, but featured some differences and experimental rules changes designed to appeal to fans of association football (soccer) and rugby football. NFL teams were incentivized to allocate players through the granting of additional training camp positions for each allocated player, and each team in NFL Europe was required to employ a number of "local" players. Most of the league's players were American, with "local" players tending to be converted rugby or soccer players playing at the punter or placekicker positions. Several NFL Europe alumni – including quarterbacks Brad Johnson, Kurt Warner, and Jake Delhomme – went on to have successful careers in the NFL, and three NFL Europe alumni (Adam Vinatieri, Dante Hall, and Brian Moorman) made the National Football League 2000s All-Decade Team.

The league's schedule went through several formats throughout its existence, but each season always culminated in the championship World Bowl game. In its initial run, each team played a ten-game schedule, and the winners of each of the three divisions (Europe, North America East, and North America West), along with the team with the best record that didn't win a division, would play in a four-team playoff. Following its revival as a six-team European league, the ten-game schedule was retained as double round-robin regular season. From 1995 to 1997, the World Bowl was played between the team with the best record in the first half of the season and the team with the best record in the second half of the season; from 1998 on, the two teams with the best records across the entire season played in the World Bowl. The Frankfurt Galaxy – the only team to play all 15 seasons of the league's existence – won the most World Bowl titles (four) and recorded the most World Bowl appearances (eight), while the final league title was won by the Hamburg Sea Devils.

== History ==
=== Founding and origins ===
In 1974, the National Football League (NFL) announced plans to launch a professional American football league in Europe, the Intercontinental Football League (IFL). Aiming for a launch in the spring of 1975, the IFL would feature six teams (located in Istanbul, Rome, Munich, West Berlin, Vienna, and Barcelona, respectively) and would be a satellite league of the NFL, with initial funds made by the NFL owners and the rosters consisting of "second-line athletes and rookies from established NFL teams". The brainchild of Bob Kap, the proposed league had already sold six franchises and had secured the rights to loan players from the NFL. The league had also pre-selected four more cities for expansion teams, and Al Davis and Tex Schramm were assigned to head the committee that would put the league together. The IFL did not materialize. The Professional Football Researchers Association attributed this failure to Europe not being ready for American football, potential competition with the World Football League (WFL), a players' strike during the summer of 1974, and the recession. Another factor was the turmoil in Europe in 1974: Turkey had invaded Cyprus, the American ambassador to Cyprus had been assassinated, Basque separatists had assassinated the prime minister of Spain, and terrorist groups like the Red Brigades had engaged in kidnapping. The State Department discouraged NFL Commissioner Pete Rozelle from pursuing the league, and the IFL also suffered a potentially fatal blow when Pan American World Airways, who Kap had brought on as a sponsor, pulled out of the project. Ultimately, Rozelle deemed the creation of the league "impractical".

By 1980, the popularity of American football was increasing in Europe without any push by the NFL. The NFL capitalized on this newfound interest by holding American Bowl games (preseason exhibition contests held overseas), and the popularity of these games, particularly in London, led to a renewed interest from Rozelle in creating an American football league in Europe. In 1989, the NFL announced plans to create an international spring football league. The NFL initially wanted the new league to be known as the International Football League, but it had to change the name after discovering that the name was already owned by Donald Trump and Charlie Finley, who were allegedly in the process of forming their own league (which would never come to fruition). The name World League of American Football (WLAF) was eventually settled on; this name was chosen to avoid associating it with the dissolved World Football League, and the term "American football" was included in the league's name because "football" in Europe typically refers to association football, known in the United States as soccer. The NFL and WLAF attempted to downplay its status as a minor league and refused to acknowledge the WLAF as a farm league of the NFL. The NFL approved the creation of the WLAF in July 1989, with Schramm to head up the project and the league expected to begin play in 1990 or 1991. The league was expected to have 12 teams (six in the United States, four in Europe, one in Canada and one in Mexico), and it secured a two-year television deal with ABC and a four-year television deal with USA Network to air regular and post-season games. Schramm was fired as league president in October 1990 due to differences between him and the NFL as to the direction the WLAF would take; Schramm had wanted the WLAF to be an "independent, major international league which would be strong enough to stand on its own feet", while the NFL had wanted the WLAF to be a small league with close ties to the NFL.

The first logo of the WLAF.

On November 14, 1990, the WLAF announced it would begin play in 1991 with ten teams (six of them in the United States, three of them in Europe, and one in Canada) split into three divisions (North America West, North America East, and Europe). A 50-game schedule stretching from March 23, 1991, to May 27, 1991, was agreed upon, and a draft was held from February 14, 1991, to February 24, 1991. Unlike the NFL draft, the World League draft was a position-by-position draft – potential draftees were divided into ten position groups, meaning each of the ten teams would have the number-one pick at a position group. All players were to receive a base salary of $20,000, but players could receive more money by meeting performance-based incentives with a maximum total salary of $100,000. Each NFL team could allocate up to four players to the WLAF, although only two, the New Orleans Saints and Kansas City Chiefs, opted to do so.

=== WLAF/World League (1991–1992) ===
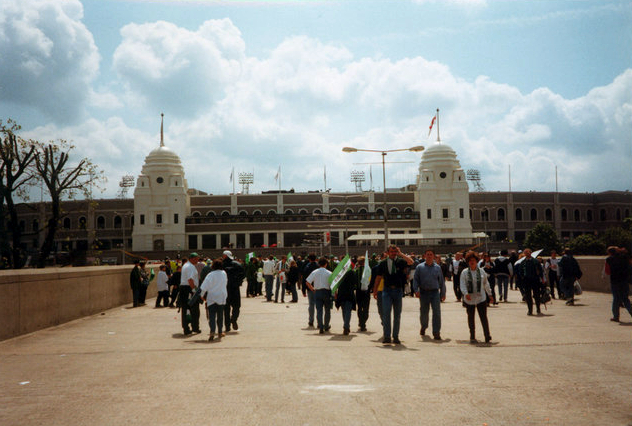
World Bowl '91, the league's first championship game, was held at Wembley Stadium; the London Monarchs defeated the Barcelona Dragons 21–0.

The World League of American Football, described by The New York Times as the "first trans-Atlantic major sports league", began play on March 23, 1991, with three games held in Frankfurt, Germany, Birmingham, Alabama, and Sacramento, California, respectively. After the conclusion of the regular season, the WLAF playoffs were held, featuring the three division champions (London Monarchs, New York/New Jersey Knights, and Birmingham Fire) and one wild-card team (Barcelona Dragons). London and Barcelona won their playoff games to meet in World Bowl '91 at Wembley Stadium, which London won 21–0.

Following its first season, the World League of American Football was at risk of folding. It suffered a loss of nearly $7 million, and none of its teams made a profit. In addition to the monetary loss for the league, television ratings on ABC and USA network were poor. According to Dan Rooney, the NFL chairman of the World League, cost estimates were accurate, but the league overestimated the amount of revenue the WLAF would make. The league's television contracts were also at risk due to poor ratings, with USA Network having lost money. The WLAF averaged around 26,000 fans a game in its first season; the European teams had a higher attendance than the North American teams, bolstering the average. Ultimately, the NFL decided to bring the league back for a second season in 1992. The league name was shortened to World League by league officials, who felt the surprising success of the league in Europe made the "American football" part unnecessary, and the Raleigh-Durham Skyhawks folded, replaced by the Ohio Glory.

=== NFL Europe/Europa (1995–2007) ===
The final logo of the league, introduced upon its name change to NFL Europa in 2006.

Although the league was "wildly popular" in Europe, with attendance averaging 45,000 for the London Monarchs, it was "ignored" in the United States. The World League suspended play for the 1993 and 1994 season before returning in 1995 as a six-team, exclusively European league. All three of the original European teams returned, along with the Birmingham Fire, who were rebooted as the Düsseldorf-based Rhein Fire, and two additional new teams (the Amsterdam Admirals and Scottish Claymores). Each team was required to have seven "local" players on their 40-man roster. Fox became a co-owner of the WLAF and a major financial contributor in return for broadcasting rights. The league was renamed the NFL Europe League (NFLEL) in 1998, and the London Monarchs were renamed the England Monarchs in an attempt to spur attendance, which had fallen below 10,000 per game. The Monarchs would fold the following season and were replaced by the Berlin Thunder.

NFL Europe commemorated its 10th season in 2002, but still remained far from being profitable. The league announced a three-year deal with the soccer club FC Barcelona to jointly promote American football in Europe and soccer in the United States; the Barcelona Dragons franchise was renamed FC Barcelona Dragons. The collaboration with FC Barcelona would prove to be unsuccessful, however, and the Barcelona Dragons would fold after the 2003 season due to declining attendance. The team's attendance had fallen to under 7,000 per game, a 50% decline since the 1997 season, when the team had won the World Bowl. The Dragons were replaced by the Cologne Centurions in 2004, and the following year the Scottish Claymores folded; although the team boasted the largest following of any Scottish sports team outside the Old Firm, averaging 10,799 per game, the league had determined an additional German team could bring in 30,000 per game.

The Claymores were replaced the following year by the Hamburg Sea Devils, which left the Amsterdam Admirals as the only team in the league not to be based in Germany. This was part of a strategic pivot to Germany, which had been the most receptive country to the league and the sport in general. Accordingly, the league changed its name to NFL Europa in 2006, ahead of the league's 15th season, to reflect the league's focus on Germany and the Netherlands.

=== Closure and legacy ===
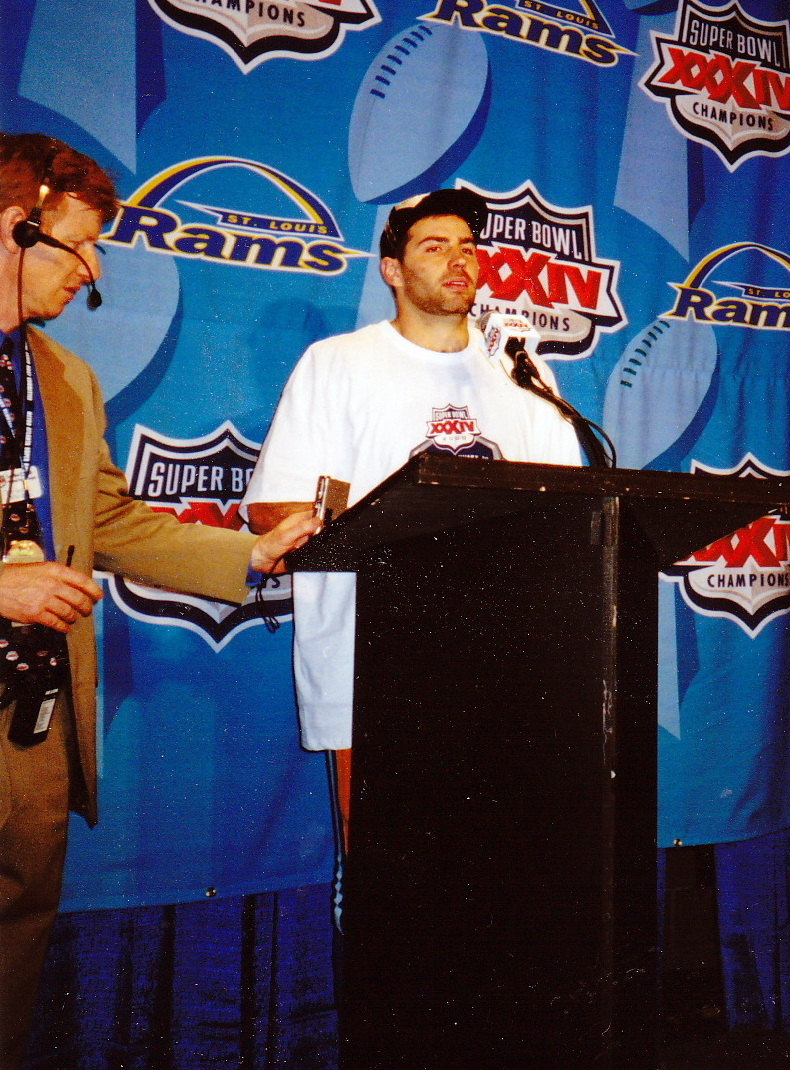
Quarterback Kurt Warner was allocated to the Amsterdam Admirals in 1998. The following year, Warner led the St. Louis Rams to victory in Super Bowl XXXIV.

On June 29, 2007, less than a week after World Bowl XV, the NFL announced the closure of NFL Europa. The league had been losing a reported US$30 million a year, and the NFL had decided to shift their strategy in marketing football abroad towards holding NFL regular-season games outside the United States. The NFL owners who funded the league were reportedly dissatisfied with NFL Europa's lack of revenue as well as its decreasing success in player development. The league had nearly folded in 2003, when eight of the 32 NFL owners voted against funding it, one short of the nine votes needed to end the league, and its gradual progression into a German-dominated league had run counter to the NFL's goals of selling merchandise throughout the European continent. The league's inability to garner a live television contract with local media markets also played a role in its demise, as the potential revenue from a deal could have helped the league financially.

Andrei S. Markovits and Lars Rensmann described the league as an "abysmal failure", noting its poor quality of play, frequent name changes, and franchise relocations as well as the accessibility of regular NFL games in Europe as reasons for its collapse. Len Pasquarelli of ESPN.com noted that the league had strayed from its original goal, with the allocation system of players gradually being abused to amass training camp exemptions rather than to develop players. John Mara, the co-owner of the New York Giants, said that the league "had some useful purpose in developing players" and that it helped the NFL determine that there was an interest in American football in Europe.

Looking back on NFL Europe in 2017, Kevin Seifert of ESPN.com noted its strong record in developing quarterbacks: Kurt Warner (a Super Bowl champion and two-time MVP), Brad Johnson (who won a Super Bowl in 2002 with the Tampa Bay Buccaneers), Jake Delhomme (who led the Carolina Panthers to an NFC championship in 2003), and journeyman quarterback Jon Kitna all spent time in NFL Europe. Two NFL Europe alumni (kicker Adam Vinatieri and return specialist Dante Hall) were included on the NFL's 2000s All-Decade Team. The league also provided an opportunity for the NFL to experiment with rules and to develop officials and coaches. Some NFL coaches and executives have suggested reviving the concept of a developmental league, and several independent leagues have been created to fill the need, but with little success. At a press conference before Super Bowl LI, league commissioner Roger Goodell said the NFL had been "actively considering" creating a new developmental league.

Since the closure of NFL Europa, the NFL has held regular-season games annually in London and has also hosted regular-season games in Mexico City and Toronto. The league is pursuing the goal of a franchise in London, as well as potential regular-season games in China. In 2021, the NFL announced it was looking for partners to host a regular-season game in Germany. In 2022, the league announced four regular-season games would be held in Germany, the first set for November 13, 2022 between the Tampa Bay Buccaneers and Seattle Seahawks to be played at Munich's Allianz Arena. NFL.com writer Judy Battista noted Germany was the "fastest-growing international community" for the league, and attributed this in part to the popularity of the former NFL Europe's German teams, but argued the large number of expats as well as the American military presence were greater factors.

In 2007, fans and former members of the Frankfurt Galaxy – the most successful of NFL Europe's teams on the field and in crowd attendance – created the Frankfurt Universe. The new team was promoted to the German Football League 2 in 2011, and won promotion to the German Football League (GFL) in 2015. The European League of Football (ELF), a pan-European league that began play in 2021, signed an agreement with the NFL allowing them to utilize the branding of the former teams of NFL Europe. The ELF's Barcelona Dragons, Berlin Thunder, Cologne Centurions, Hamburg Sea Devils, Frankfurt Galaxy, and Rhein Fire all share the names and imagery of their NFL Europe predecessors.

=== Season structure and development ===
2007 NFL Europa standings
Team	W	L	PCT
Hamburg Sea Devils	7	3	.700
Frankfurt Galaxy	7	3	.700
Cologne Centurions	6	4	.600
Rhein Fire	4	6	.400
Amsterdam Admirals	4	6	.400
Berlin Thunder	2	8	.200

This chart demonstrates the league's table for the 2007 season. From 1998 to 2007, each team played ten games (a home and away game against every other team in the league), and the top two teams at the end of the season (highlighted in green) qualified for the championship game, the World Bowl. The Hamburg Sea Devils won the game 37–28, securing the league's championship.

From 1991 to 1992, the ten-team WLAF was split into three divisions: North America East, North America West, and Europe with a ten-game regular season schedule. All three division champions, in addition to the team with the best record who didn't win its division, made the playoffs. The winners of the two playoff games played for the league championship in the World Bowl. The ten game schedule was retained upon the league's return in 1995, but was modified with the new six-team format. Each team played every other team twice in a double round-robin regular season. Following the regular season, two teams would be selected for the World Bowl; the team that led the league's standings after week five would host the game, and the team with the best overall record at the end of the season would be their opponent. This format was criticized for making the second half of the league's season less competitive, and beginning with the 1998 season it was changed to have the two teams with the best overall records play in the World Bowl instead.

The league played under standard NFL rules, with several exceptions. In an effort to appeal to fans of rugby and soccer, the league instituted rules to speed up the pace of the game and awarded four points for field goals made from beyond 50 yards as opposed to the typical three points. Rule changes instituted upon the league's revival in 1995 included the creation of the defensive two-point conversion, referred to by the league as the "deuce", as well as only requiring receivers to have one foot in bounds on a completed pass. The regular-season overtime period consisted of a single 10-minute quarter where both teams were required to have control of the ball at least once, and the play clock was set to 35 seconds. Starting with the 1997 season, the league required the receiver to have two feet in bounds for a completed pass. Ties were possible in the league, with two (a 1992 game between the London Monarchs and Birmingham Fire and a 2006 game between the Berlin Thunder and Hamburg Sea Devils) occurring in league history.

NFL teams were allowed to allocate players to NFL Europe. In exchange for doing this, they were awarded with exemptions for training camp, allowing them to bring more players than would otherwise be allowed. A certain number of players on each team of NFL Europe were required to be "local players", and at least two local players were required to be on the field at all times during games. Despite this, most of the league's most prominent players were Americans; "local players" were often converted rugby or soccer players playing as punters or placekickers.

== Teams ==
=== World League of American Football/World League (1991–1992) ===
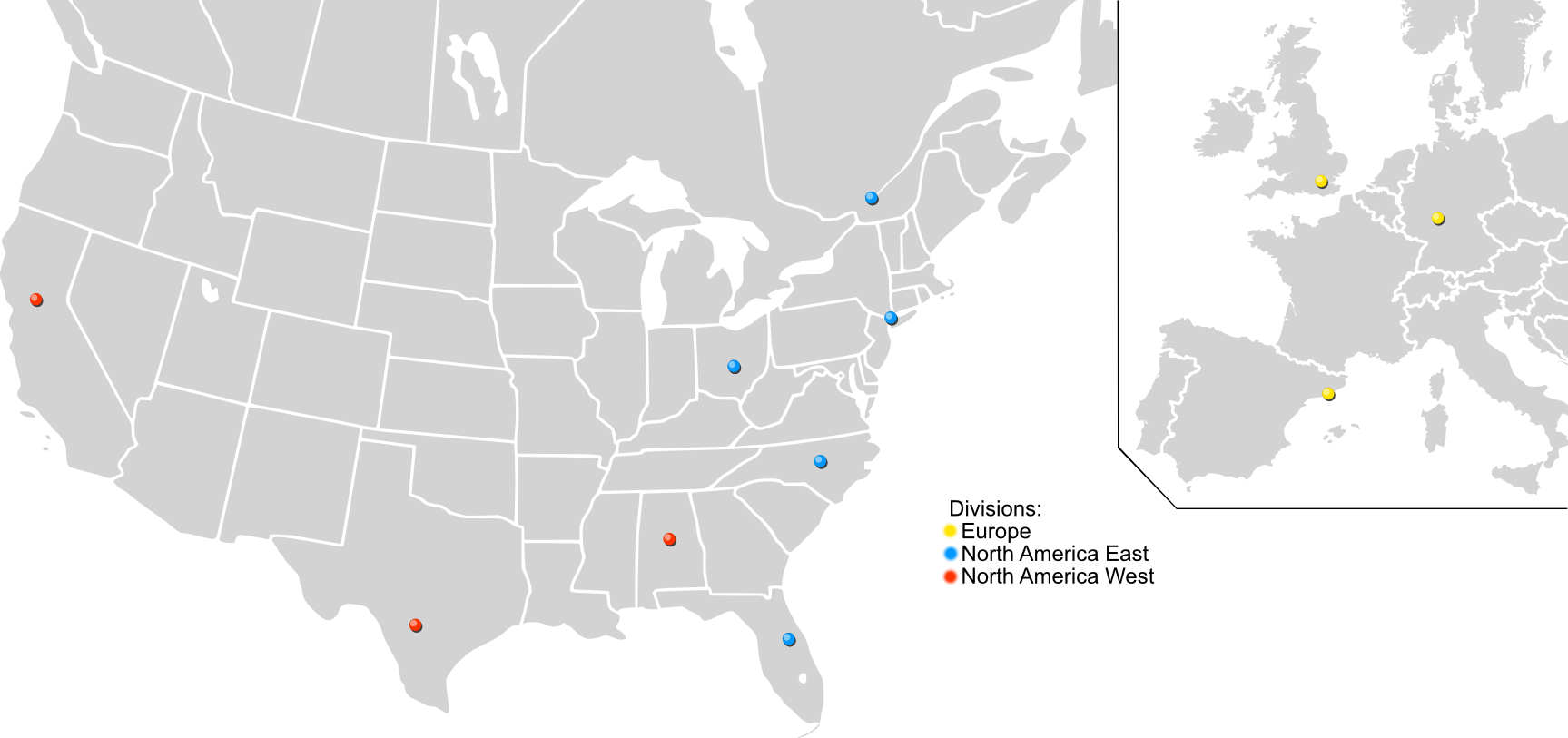

World League of American Football teams
Location	Teams	City	Seasons
Europe	(Spain) Barcelona Dragons	Barcelona, Spain	1991–92
Europe	(Germany) Frankfurt Galaxy	Frankfurt, Germany	1991–92
Europe	(England) London Monarchs	London, United Kingdom	1991–92
North America East	(Canada) Montreal Machine	Montreal, Quebec	1991–92
North America East	(United States) New York/New Jersey Knights	East Rutherford, New Jersey	1991–92
North America East	(United States) Ohio Glory	Columbus, Ohio	1992
North America East	(United States) Orlando Thunder	Orlando, Florida	1991–92
North America East	(United States) Raleigh-Durham Skyhawks	Raleigh, North Carolina	1991
North America West	(United States) Birmingham Fire	Birmingham, Alabama	1991–92
North America West	(United States) San Antonio Riders	San Antonio, Texas	1991–92
North America West	(United States) Sacramento Surge	Sacramento, California	1991–92

=== World League/NFL Europe League/NFL Europa (1995–2007) ===
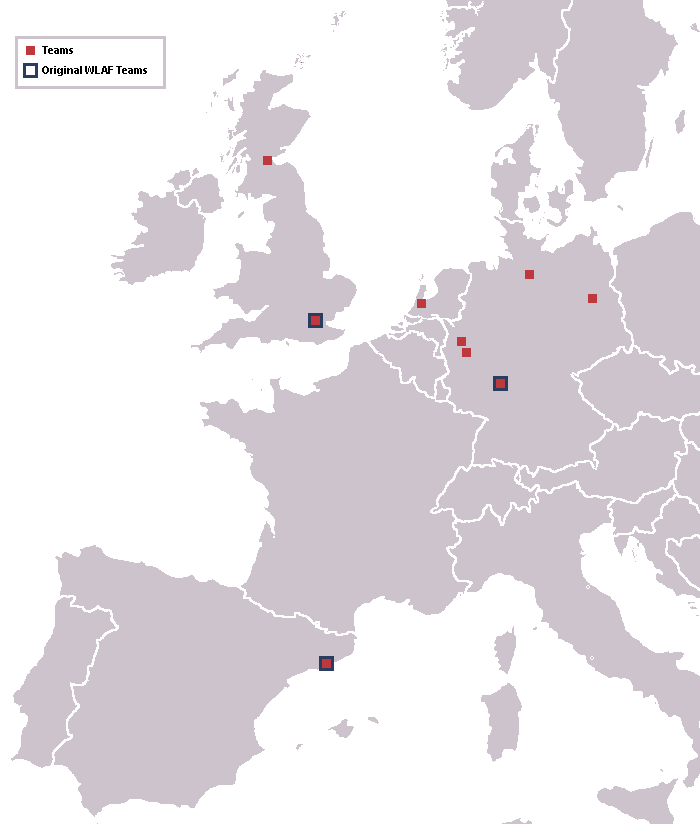

NFL Europe teams
Teams	City	Seasons
(Netherlands) Amsterdam Admirals	Amsterdam, Netherlands	1995–2007
(Spain) Barcelona / FC Barcelona Dragons	Barcelona, Spain	1995–2003
(Germany) Berlin Thunder	Berlin, Germany	1999–2007
(Germany) Cologne Centurions	Cologne, Germany	2004–2007
(Germany) Frankfurt Galaxy	Frankfurt, Germany	1995–2007
(Germany) Hamburg Sea Devils	Hamburg, Germany	2005–2007
London / England Monarchs	London, United Kingdom	1995–1998
(Germany) Rhein Fire	Düsseldorf, Germany	1995–2007
(Scotland) Scottish Claymores	Edinburgh, United Kingdom (1995–2000); Glasgow, United Kingdom (2000–04)	1995–2004

== Trophy and awards ==
NFL Europe presented several awards and honors. The World Bowl trophy, awarded to the winners of the annual World Bowl game, was a 40-pound glass globe. The winning team also received championship rings Other awards included regular season most valuable player awards on offense and defense, a coach of the year award, and an award for the World Bowl MVP. The league also awarded offensive, defensive, special teams, and national players of the week, and named an all-league team at the end of the season.

=== Award winners ===
Season	OMVP	Team	DMVP	Team	CoTY	Team	Ref.
1991	Stan Gelbaugh	(England) London Monarchs	John Brantley	(United States) Birmingham Fire	Larry Kennan	(England) London Monarchs	
1991	Stan Gelbaugh	(England) London Monarchs	Danny Lockett	(England) London Monarchs	Larry Kennan	(England) London Monarchs	
1991	Stan Gelbaugh	(England) London Monarchs	Anthony Parker	(United States) New York/New Jersey Knights	Larry Kennan	(England) London Monarchs	
1992	David Archer	(United States) Sacramento Surge	Adrian Jones	(Spain) Barcelona Dragons	Galen Hall	(United States) Orlando Thunder	
1995	Paul Justin	(Germany) Frankfurt Galaxy	Malcolm Showell	(Netherlands) Amsterdam Admirals	Ernie Stautner	(Germany) Frankfurt Galaxy	
1996	Sean LaChapelle	(Scotland) Scottish Claymores	Ty Parten	(Scotland) Scottish Claymores	Jim Criner	(Scotland) Scottish Claymores	
1997	T. J. Rubley	(Germany) Rhein Fire	Jason Simmons	(Scotland) Scottish Claymores	Galen Hall (2)	(Germany) Rhein Fire	
1998	Marcus Robinson	(Germany) Rhein Fire	Josh Taves	(Spain) Barcelona Dragons	Dick Curl	(Germany) Frankfurt Galaxy	
1999	Lawrence Phillips	(Spain) Barcelona Dragons	Mike Maslowski	(Spain) Barcelona Dragons	Dick Curl (2)	(Germany) Frankfurt Galaxy	
2000	Aaron Stecker	(Scotland) Scottish Claymores	Jonathan Brown	(Germany) Berlin Thunder	Galen Hall (3)	(Germany) Rhein Fire	
2000	Aaron Stecker	(Scotland) Scottish Claymores	Duane Hawthorne	(Scotland) Scottish Claymores	Galen Hall (3)	(Germany) Rhein Fire	
2001	Mike Green	(Spain) Barcelona Dragons	Roshaun Matthews	(Netherlands) Amsterdam Admirals	Jack Bicknell	(Spain) Barcelona Dragons	
2002	Jamal Robertson	(Germany) Rhein Fire	Deke Cooper	(Germany) Rhein Fire	Peter Vaas	(Germany) Berlin Thunder	
2003	Ken Simonton	(Scotland) Scottish Claymores	Rashidi Barnes	(Germany) Frankfurt Galaxy	Doug Graber	(Germany) Frankfurt Galaxy	
2004	Rohan Davey	(Germany) Berlin Thunder	Corey Jackson	(Germany) Frankfurt Galaxy	Rick Lantz	(Germany) Berlin Thunder	
2005	Dave Ragone	(Germany) Berlin Thunder	Rich Scanlon	(Germany) Berlin Thunder	Bart Andrus	(Netherlands) Amsterdam Admirals	
2006	Gibran Hamdan	(Netherlands) Amsterdam Admirals	Tony Brown	(Netherlands) Amsterdam Admirals	Mike Jones	(Germany) Frankfurt Galaxy	
2006	Gibran Hamdan	(Netherlands) Amsterdam Admirals	Philippe Garden	(Germany) Cologne Centurions	Mike Jones	(Germany) Frankfurt Galaxy	
2007	Derrick Ross	(Germany) Cologne Centurions	Jason Hall	(Germany) Cologne Centurions	Vince Martino	(Germany) Hamburg Sea Devils	
2007	J. T. O'Sullivan	(Germany) Frankfurt Galaxy	Jason Hall	(Germany) Cologne Centurions	Vince Martino	(Germany) Hamburg Sea Devils	

== Television coverage ==
=== 1991–1992 ===
In the United States, television coverage was provided by the ABC and USA Network. The reported cost of the contracts varied. According to the Los Angeles Times, ABC committed to $28 million over two years, and USA Network committed to $25 million for the same length of time with an additional two-year option. Ratings were characterized as "poor" in the inaugural season, with ABC averaging a 2.1 rating and USA Network averaging a 1.2 rating. Television ratings in the United States were "dismal" during the league's second season, with ABC averaging a 1.7 rating and USA Network averaging a 1.1 rating. As a result, ABC's payment was reduced to $3 million while USA saw theirs lowered to $10 million. According to The New York Times, USA Network was "not happy" with this arrangement and did not heavily promote the league as a result.

International teams aired on different domestic networks. Montreal Machine games were aired in English on TSN and in French on RDS. Coverage in Europe was mostly on satellite television. Eurosport showed games on delay and Super Channel aired the 1991 World Bowl. In the United Kingdom, Channel 4 showed half-hour highlights of Monarchs games on Saturday mornings. Larry Eichel of the Philadelphia Inquirer wrote that "The only way a Monarchs fan could watch the team's first-round playoff game from the Meadowlands was to go to Wembley to see it on closed circuit."

=== 1995–2007 ===
The revived league's United Kingdom television coverage was mainly on Sky Sports, with additional coverage also on Channel 4, STV, and Carlton. Eight European continental broadcasters also showed games, including Germany's Vox and DSF.

Although the league no longer had any U.S. teams, it was covered on American television until its closure. Fox became a co-owner of the league in exchange for broadcasting rights, and following the relaunch all regular season games were broadcast on the FX network. Fox ended its joint ownership with the league in 2000, but continued to air some games as a television partner. In 2004, NFL Network began airing select NFL Europe games. This was expanded to cover all NFL Europe games – including the World Bowl – in 2006.

== Records ==
=== Champions and runners-up ===
Season	Champion	Wins	Losses	Runner-up	Wins	Losses	Ref.
1991	(England) London Monarchs	9	1	(Spain) Barcelona Dragons	8	2	
1992	(United States) Sacramento Surge	8	2	(United States) Orlando Thunder	8	2	
1995	(Germany) Frankfurt Galaxy	6	4	(Netherlands) Amsterdam Admirals	9	1	
1996	(Scotland) Scottish Claymores	7	3	(Germany) Frankfurt Galaxy	6	4	
1997	(Spain) Barcelona Dragons	5	5	(Germany) Rhein Fire	7	3	
1998	(Germany) Rhein Fire	7	3	(Germany) Frankfurt Galaxy	7	3	
1999	(Germany) Frankfurt Galaxy (2)	6	4	(Spain) Barcelona Dragons	7	3	
2000	(Germany) Rhein Fire (2)	7	3	(Scotland) Scottish Claymores	6	4	
2001	(Germany) Berlin Thunder	6	4	(Spain) Barcelona Dragons	8	2	
2002	(Germany) Berlin Thunder (2)	6	4	(Germany) Rhein Fire	7	3	
2003	(Germany) Frankfurt Galaxy (3)	6	4	(Germany) Rhein Fire	6	4	
2004	(Germany) Berlin Thunder (3)	9	1	(Germany) Frankfurt Galaxy	7	3	
2005	(Netherlands) Amsterdam Admirals	6	4	(Germany) Berlin Thunder	7	3	
2006	(Germany) Frankfurt Galaxy (4)	7	3	(Netherlands) Amsterdam Admirals	7	3	
2007	(Germany) Hamburg Sea Devils	7	3	(Germany) Frankfurt Galaxy	7	3	

=== Win–loss records ===
Team	GP	Wins	Losses	Ties	Pct.	Championships	Seasons	Ref.
(Netherlands) Amsterdam Admirals	130	68	62	0	.523	1	1995–2007	
(Spain) Barcelona / FC Barcelona Dragons	110	59	51	0	.536	1	1991–1992; 1995–2003	
(Germany) Berlin Thunder	90	42	47	1	.472	3	1999–2007	
(United States) Birmingham Fire	20	12	7	1	.625	0	1991–1992	
(Germany) Cologne Centurions	40	20	20	0	.500	0	2004–2007	
(Germany) Frankfurt Galaxy	150	82	68	0	.547	4	1991–1992; 1995–2007	
London / England Monarchs	60	26	33	1	.442	1	1991–1992; 1995–1998	
(Germany) Hamburg Sea Devils	30	15	14	1	.517	1	2005–2007	
(Canada) Montreal Machine	20	6	14	0	.300	0	1991–1992	
(United States) New York/New Jersey Knights	20	11	9	0	.550	0	1991–1992	
(United States) Ohio Glory	10	1	9	0	.100	0	1992	
(United States) Orlando Thunder	20	13	7	0	.650	0	1991–1992	
(United States) Raleigh–Durham Skyhawks	10	0	10	0	.000	0	1991	
(Germany) Rhein Fire	130	68	62	0	.523	2	1995–2007	
(United States) Sacramento Surge	20	11	9	0	.550	1	1991–1992	
(United States) San Antonio Riders	20	11	9	0	.550	0	1991–1992	
(Scotland) Scottish Claymores	100	43	57	0	.430	1	1995–2004	
