= 1989 San Diego Chargers season =

NFL team season

- Owner: Alex Spanos
- General manager: Steve Ortmayer
- Head coach: Dan Henning
- Home stadium: Jack Murphy Stadium

Results
- Record: 6–10
- Division place: 5th AFC West
- Playoffs: Did not qualify
- All-Pros: 1: DE Lee Williams (2nd team)
- Pro Bowlers: 3: WR Anthony Miller; DE Leslie O'Neal; DE Lee Williams

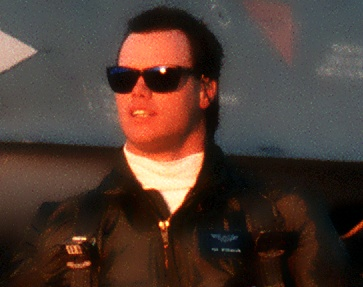
Former Bears quarterback Jim McMahon was brought in to boost the Chargers' passing offense.

The 1989 San Diego Chargers season was the franchise's 20th season in the National Football League (NFL), its 30th overall and the first season under head coach Dan Henning, whose predecessor, Al Saunders, had been fired shortly after the previous season.

The team matched their 6–10 record from 1988. Their season followed a similar pattern to the previous year, with their six wins arriving in three pairs. San Diego brought in a high-profile free agent in quarterback Jim McMahon, but it was their defensive unit that saw a big improvement, ranking sixth in the league, and never conceding more than 26 points in a game after week 2.

On the field, McMahon's form was indifferent; off it, he repeatedly clashed with journalists. He was released shortly after the season finished. Second-year receiver Anthony Miller had a strong year with 1,252 yards. The running game lost Gary Anderson to a holdout, which lasted the entire season; one of his replacements, 7th-round draft pick Marion Butts, was the only player from San Diego's 1989 draft class to make the Pro Bowl during his career.

The combination of a strong defense and mediocre offense led to several close finishes - thirteen games were decided by seven points or fewer, including the last twelve in a row. Before the NFL adopted the two-point conversion in 1994, this was tied for the most one-score games in a single season.

== Offseason ==
=== Head coaching change ===
Al Saunders was fired the day after the 1988 season ended, after two-and-a-half seasons in charge. He had compiled a 17–22 record, with no playoff appearances. Saunders had publicly criticised the personnel decisions of Steve Ortmayer, the Chargers' director of football operations, creating personal friction that potentially accelerated his departure.

Marty Schottenheimer, who had recently resigned as Cleveland Browns head coach, was among those interviewed for the San Diego vacancy. Schottenheimer signed for the Chiefs instead, though he would become the Chargers' head coach 13 years later. Other candidates included Chicago assistant Johnny Roland, Washington assistant Dan Henning, Illinois head coach Mike White, and the Chargers' own defensive coordinator, Ron Lynn.

On February 9, Henning was named to the role, bringing an end to a long search - the Chargers had been the first in the league to fire their previous head coach, but the last to appoint a replacement. While serving as an offensive assistant with Washington, Henning's teams had won Super Bowls in 1982 and 1987. He had struggled as a head coach in between those jobs, compiling a record of 22-41-1 in Atlanta from 1983 to 1986, with a losing record in each of the four seasons. Ortmayer spoke of Henning's Super Bowl rings as a factor in the hire, as well as his willingness to retain the incumbent Chargers assistant coaches.

Henning had previously been in San Diego as a quarterback, in 1966, when he made his solitary appearance for a professional team.

=== Departures and arrivals ===
Having passed for 2,388 yards the previous season, third worst in the league, San Diego sought a new quarterback during the offseason. Chargers' owner Alex Spanos had mentioned Jim McMahon as a possible acquisition as early as March. McMahon had won a Super Bowl ring four seasons previously, but had proven injury-prone since then. San Diego were still linked with McMahon during the draft, and eventually worked out a deal on August 18, with McMahon's relationship with Chicago head coach Mike Ditka having deteriorated substantially. Chicago received a conditional pick in the following year's draft. This proved to be a second-round pick. Two quarterbacks from the previous season, meanwhile, left the team. Babe Laufenberg, who had started the first six games, was released in April; Mark Malone, starter in eight games, was re-signed in July but released in August after McMahon was acquired.

The running back position also saw significant upheaval, prompted by Gary Anderson's season-long holdout. Anderson, who was coming off a 1,000-yard season, asked that his wages be increased from $400,000 per season to $1 million. The Chargers' highest offer was $700,000. As the holdout dragged on, San Diego made lower offers, while refusing Anderson's trade requests. By October 21, the player had sold his home in San Diego, resolving not to play there again. After sitting out the entire year, he signed for the Buccaneers in April 1990. Also at the running back position, the versatile Lionel James was cut shortly before the season started, backup Barry Redden was traded to Cleveland, and former Super Bowl winner Timmy Smith came in as a free agent only to be cut. 8th-year running back Darrin Nelson came in as a mid-season trade. He arrived from Dallas in exchange for a mid-round draft pick, after stating he'd sooner retire than play for the Cowboys.

Wide receiver Phil McConkey, a former Super Bowl winner, was another mid-season pickup - his five games in San Diego proved to be the last of his NFL career.

There were also significant changes in the offensive line. Ken Dallafior (traded to Detroit) and Dan Rosado (waived) left after starting a combined 24 games in 1988, while Dennis McKnight, who had started every non-strike game since 1984, missed the entire season after rupturing a tendon in his knee in the final preseason game, and didn't play for the Chargers again. Newcomers to the line included tackles Joel Patten and Brett Miller, who were picked up from the Colts and Falcons respectively.

On defense, 1988 holdout Chip Banks went to Indianapolis, and Keith Browner was released after failing a drug test. Browner had started 15 games at linebacker in 1988. The Chargers added Jim Collins, a former Pro Bowl linebacker.

The Chargers also released punter Ralf Mojsiejenko and kickers Steve DeLine and Vince Abbott. Fourteen-year veteran Chris Bahr beat out DeLine and Abbott for the kicking job in training camp, while Lewis Colbert lasted only two games as the new punter before being replaced by CFL veteran Hank Ilesic.

=== NFL draft ===
San Diego made ten selections in the 1989 draft. Their first pick (eighth overall) was defensive end Burt Grossman, from the University of Pittsburgh, described by Henning as "the best downline pass rusher in this draft". The Chargers came close to timing out and forfeiting their pick, as several possible deals to trade down fell through - San Diego were trying to obtain a free agent quarterback, with both McMahon and Washington backup Stan Humphries mentioned as possibilities. Humphries would become a Charger four years later. Grossman held out until August 25, but ultimately signed a five-year deal worth over $3 million.

In the second round, San Diego picked center Courtney Hall. Long-time center Don Macek had missed the final 11 games of the previous season through injury; Hall was inserted into the starting line-up in week 1, and didn't miss a game until 1994. With McMahon not yet acquired, the Chargers gave up three picks to select a quarterback. They worked a trade with the Giants, swapping a third-, fourth- and seventh-round pick for New York's second-round choice. With this, they selected Billy Joe Tolliver from Texas Tech.

Further down in the draft, San Diego found a future Pro Bowler in running back Marion Butts. With Anderson holding out, Butts was pressed into immediate action in 1989, and finished as the Chargers' top rusher. He would gain over 4,000 yards in 5 seasons with the team. During training camp, eighth-round pick Dana Brinson made a sufficiently good impression as a runner and receiver that he took Lionel James' spot on the roster.

1989 San Diego Chargers draft
Round	Pick	Player	Position	College	Notes
1	8	Burt Grossman	Defensive end	Pittsburgh	
2	37	Courtney Hall	Center	Rice	
2	51	Billy Joe Tolliver	Quarterback	Texas Tech	
5	120	Elliot Smith	Defensive back	Alcorn State	
7	183	Marion Butts *	Running back	Florida State	
7	195	Terrence Jones	Quarterback	Tulane	
8	204	Dana Brinson	Wide receiver	Nebraska	
9	231	Pat Davis	Tight end	Syracuse	
10	260	Ricky Andrews	Linebacker	Washington	
11	287	Victor Floyd	Running back	Florida State	
Made roster * Made at least one Pro Bowl during career

== Personnel ==
=== Staff ===
1989 San Diego Chargers staff
Front office: Chairman of the board and President – Alex Spanos; Vice chairman – Dean Spanos; Director of football operations – Steve Ortmayer; Director of player personnel – Chet Franklin; Director of pro personnel – Rudy Feldman; Head coaches: Head coach – Dan Henning; Offensive coaches: Offensive coordinator/offensive line – Larry Beightol; Assistant head coach/Quarterbacks – Ted Tollner; Offensive backs – Bobby Jackson; Receivers – Charlie Joiner; Tight ends – Ed White	Defensive coaches: Defensive coordinator – Ron Lynn; Defensive line – Gunther Cunningham; Linebackers – Mike Haluchak; Secondary – Jim L. Mora; Special teams coaches: Special teams – Joe Madden; Coaching assistant – LeCharls McDaniel; Strength and conditioning: Strength and Conditioning – Chris Hartman

=== Roster ===
1989 San Diego Chargers roster
Quarterbacks (QB): 15 David Archer; 9 Jim McMahon; 11 Billy Joe Tolliver; Running backs (RB): 35 Marion Butts; 20 Darrin Nelson; 43 Tim Spencer; Wide receivers (WR): 89 Anthony Allen; 87 Quinn Early; 86 Jamie Holland KR; 21 Phil McConkey PR; 83 Anthony Miller KR; 80 Wayne Walker PR; Tight ends (TE): 88 Arthur Cox; 31 Craig McEwen; 85 Andy Parker; 81 Mark Walczak	Offensive linemen (OL): 70 James FitzPatrick G/T; 53 Courtney Hall C; 62 Don Macek C; 74 Brett Miller T; 78 Joel Patten T; 65 David Richards G; 76 Broderick Thompson G; Defensive linemen (DL): 95 Joe Campbell DE; 92 Burt Grossman DE; 97 George Hinkle DE; 69 Les Miller NT; 75 Joe Phillips NT; 98 Gerald Robinson DE; 99 Lee Williams DE	Linebackers (LB): 58 David Brandon OLB; 55 Jim Collins ILB; 51 Cedric Figaro ILB; 91 Leslie O'Neal OLB; 50 Gary Plummer ILB; 54 Billy Ray Smith OLB; 59 Ken Woodard OLB; Defensive backs (DB): 44 Martin Bayless SS; 23 Roy Bennett CB; 32 Michael Brooks FS; 22 Gill Byrd CB; 25 Vencie Glenn FS; 24 Lester Lyles SS; 34 Elvis Patterson CB; 28 Elliot Smith CB/S; Special teams (ST): 3 Chris Bahr K; 8 Hank Ilesic P	Practice squad: 33 Dana Brinson RB; 27 Victor Floyd RB; 63 Stacy Searels C/G; Reserve: 82 Rod Bernstine TE (IR); 46 Joe Caravello TE (IR); 84 Chris Gannon TE (IR); 37 Napoleon McCallum RB (Military); 60 Dennis McKnight G (IR); 30 Sam Seale CB (IR); 13 Mark Vlasic QB (PUP); 67 Larry Williams C/G (PUP); Rookies in italics 47 active, 8 reserve, 3 practice squad

== Preseason ==
San Diego struggled to a 20–3 defeat in their preseason opener, turning the ball over five times against the Cowboys. Quarterbacks Billy Joe Tolliver, David Archer and Mark Malone combined for 20 completions from 42 attempts, for 198 yards. The Chargers managed only a Chris Bahr field goal, wasting a strong defensive performance that saw Dallas gain only 206 yards. Rookie Marion Butts led all rushers with 12 carries for 61 yards. Jim McMahon joined the Chargers the day before their second game, which was against his old club, Chicago. McMahon featured only briefly, with Tolliver throwing two touchdown passes in a 24–7 win. McMahon saw more extensive action in the next game, a 17–14 loss to the defending Super Bowl champions, San Francisco. He struggled, completing 7 of 13 passes for 26 yards and an interception. Tolliver again threw two touchdowns, with Butts and Anthony Miller scoring after the 49ers went 17–0 ahead. Steve DeLine was short on a potentially game-tying 53-yard field goal try late in the game.

The final preseason game had a dramatic finish. Despite a 49-yard touchdown pass from McMahon to Miller, the Chargers trailed 20–7 after a Cardinals' field goal with 9:38 to play. Tolliver then led a 65-yard touchdown drive, with Butts scoring from a yard out. Bahr, who had earlier missed two field goals, then recovered his own onside kick, but Tolliver was intercepted. After forcing a punt, San Diego took over on their own 39 with 1:49 to play, and began a 15-play drive that saw Tolliver convert two fourth downs, before breaking a collarbone while scrambling out of bounds at the Phoenix 4 yard line with a second left. McMahon came back in and found Quinn Early for the game-winner as time expired. As well as Tolliver, offensive lineman Dennis McKnight ruptured during a tendon in his knee during the game, and missed the whole regular season.

Week	Date	Opponent	Result	Record	Venue	Attendance
1	August 13	Dallas Cowboys	L 3–20	0–1	Jack Murphy Stadium	40,203
2	August 19	at Chicago Bears	W 24–7	1–1	Soldier Field	60,167
3	August 23	at San Francisco 49ers	L 14–17	1–2	Candlestick Park	54,471
4	September 1	Phoenix Cardinals	W 21–20	2–2	Jack Murphy Stadium	41,453

== Regular season ==
=== Overview ===
Jim McMahon struggled at quarterback, and was benched for five games, including the final four of the year. He passed for under 100 yards in three of his eleven starts, and finished the year with 2,132 yds, 10 touchdowns and 10 interceptions. His relations with the media were frequently frosty: when asked by a reporter whether he was in pain, McMahon responded, "Only when I look at you". On another occasion, he blew his nose in the direction of a reporter who had brought up San Diego's two-minute offense. Dan Henning released McMahon shortly after the season ended. Rookie backup Billy Joe Tolliver won two of his five starts, but his passer rating of 57.9 was well below the league average of 75.6. Despite the indifferent quarterbacking play, second-year wide receiver Anthony Miller performed well enough that his teammates voted him the Chargers' MVP for the season; he had 75 catches for 1,252 yards and 10 touchdowns, ranking at least eleventh in the league in each statistic. His mark for receptions was twice what any of his teammates posted, his yardage triple any teammate, and his touchdown tally was double the combined total of every other Charger.

While Gary Anderson's holdout meant that the running game had lost a 1,000-yard rusher from 1988, rookie Marion Butts proved a pleasant surprise for his head coach, scoring seven touchdowns in his first six games. He had a scoring drought mid-season, and missed time through injury, but still led the team with 683 yards at 4 yards per carry, while his total of nine rushing touchdowns ranked seventh in the league. Tim Spencer added 521 yards, and the team ranked near the middle of the league overall.

San Diego's defense ranked ninth in the league for points allowed, and sixth for yardage. They benefitted from a strong defensive front seven, where Leslie O'Neal shifted to the outside linebacker position to make room for rookie defensive end Burt Grossman. O'Neal, back to full fitness following his 1986 knee injury, had 12 1/2 sacks, while Grossman had 10 and Lee Williams led the AFC with 14. The trio's combined total of 36 1/2 helped San Diego rank third in the league with 48 sacks. Inside linebacker Gary Plummer led the team with 146 tackles, while Gill Byrd's seven interceptions were the most by a Charger, and tied for fourth-best in the league.

On special teams, Chris Bahr made 17 of 25 kicks, ranking 22nd in the league with a 68% conversion rate. The Chargers struggled to cover kick returns, giving up the fifth highest average yardage per punt return with 10.5 and second highest per kickoff return with 21.9. Anthony Miller, in addition to his successes on offense, averaged 25.4 yards on 21 kickoff returns, fourth best in the league, while running one back for a touchdown for the second consecutive season.

=== Schedule ===
Week	Date	Opponent	Result	Record	Venue	Attendance	Recap
1	September 10	at **Los Angeles Raiders**	**L** 14–40	0–1	Los Angeles Memorial Coliseum	40,237	Recap
2	September 17	Houston Oilers	**L** 27–34	0–2	Jack Murphy Stadium	42,013	Recap
3	September 24	**Kansas City Chiefs**	**W** 21–6	1–2	Jack Murphy Stadium	40,128	Recap
4	October 1	at Phoenix Cardinals	**W** 24–13	2–2	Sun Devil Stadium	44,201	Recap
5	October 8	at **Denver Broncos**	**L** 10–16	2–3	Mile High Stadium	75,222	Recap
6	October 15	**Seattle Seahawks**	**L** 16–17	2–4	Jack Murphy Stadium	50,079	Recap
7	October 22	New York Giants	**L** 13–20	2–5	Jack Murphy Stadium	48,566	Recap
8	October 29	at **Seattle Seahawks**	**L** 7–10	2–6	Kingdome	59,691	Recap
9	November 5	Philadelphia Eagles	**W** 20–17	3–6	Jack Murphy Stadium	47,019	Recap
10	November 12	**Los Angeles Raiders**	**W** 14–12	4–6	Jack Murphy Stadium	59,151	Recap
11	November 19	at Pittsburgh Steelers	**L** 17–20	4–7	Three Rivers Stadium	44,203	Recap
12	November 26	at Indianapolis Colts	**L** 6–10	4–8	Hoosier Dome	58,822	Recap
13	December 3	New York Jets	**L** 17–20	4–9	Jack Murphy Stadium	38,954	Recap
14	December 10	at Washington Redskins	**L** 21–26	4–10	RFK Stadium	47,693	Recap
15	December 17	at **Kansas City Chiefs**	**W** 20–13	5–10	Arrowhead Stadium	40,623	Recap
16	December 24	**Denver Broncos**	**W** 19–16	6–10	Jack Murphy Stadium	50,524	Recap
Note: Intra-division opponents are in **bold** text.

=== Game summaries ===
All game reports use the Pro Football Researchers' gamebook archive as a source.

==== Week 1: at Los Angeles Raiders ====
Week One: San Diego Chargers at Los Angeles Raiders – Game summary

Quarter	1	2	3	4	Total
Chargers	7	0	7	0	**14**
Raiders	7	14	7	12	**40**

at Memorial Coliseum, Los Angeles, California

- Date: September 10
- Game time: 1:00 p.m. PDT
- Game weather: 65 °F (18.3 °C), relative humidity 80%, wind 10 mph
- Game attendance: 40,237
- Referee: Jim Tunney
- TV announcers (NBC): Charlie Jones and Merlin Olsen
- Box score

Game information

**First quarter**

- RAI – Vance Mueller 26-yard pass from Jay Schroeder (Jeff Jaeger kick), 12:10. Raiders 7–0. **Drive: 4 plays, 76 yards, 2:50.**
- SDG – Marion Butts 50-yard run (Chris Bahr kick), 6:45. Tied 7–7. **Drive: 9 plays, 85 yards, 5:25.**

**Second quarter**

- RAI – Mervyn Fernandez 4-yard pass from Steve Beuerlein (Jeff Jaeger kick), 8:35. Raiders 14–7. **Drive: 15 plays, 78 yards, 7:33.**
- RAI – Marcus Allen 1-yard run (Chris Bahr kick), 12:10. Raiders 21–7. **Drive: 9 plays, 49 yards, 4:05.**

**Third quarter**

- RAI – Willie Gault 39-yard pass from Steve Beuerlein (Jeff Jaeger kick), 12:46. Raiders 28–7. **Drive: 1 play, 39 yards, 0:06.**
- SDG – Marion Butts 1-yard run (Chris Bahr kick), 10:06. Raiders 28–14. **Drive: 4 plays, 43 yards, 1:38.**

**Fourth quarter**

- RAI – Jeff Jaeger 22-yard field goal, 10:27. Raiders 31–14. **Drive: 7 plays, 56 yards, 3:57.**
- RAI – Safety, Stefon Adams tackled Victor Floyd in end zone, 10:17. Raiders 33–14.
- RAI – Vance Mueller 1-yard run (Chris Bahr kick), 5:13. Raiders 40–14. **Drive: 8 plays, 37 yards, 5:04.**

**Top passers**

- SDG – Jim McMahon – 7/18, 91 yards
- RAI – Steve Beuerlein – 15/22, 206 yards, 2 TD

**Top rushers**

- SDG – Marion Butts – 9 rushes, 64 yards, 2 TD
- RAI – Marcus Allen – 13 rushes, 51 yards, TD

**Top receivers**

- SDG – Anthony Miller – 3 receptions, 58 yards
- RAI – Willie Gault – 4 receptions, 131 yards, TD

Jim McMahon struggled on his San Diego debut as the Chargers were well beaten. On the game's first play from scrimmage, a hit by Leslie O'Neal on Jay Schroeder forced the Raider quarterback to leave the game, but not until after he'd capped a 4-play, 76-yard drive with a touchdown pass. McMahon converted third downs with his arm and his legs during the answering drive; San Diego reached a 3rd and 1 at midfield, from where rookie Marion Butts burst through the middle and scored a 50-yard touchdown on only his third NFL carry. O'Neal sacked backup QB Steve Beuerlein on the next drive to force a punt, but Los Angeles came back with three straight touchdown drives, and Beuerlein had scoring throws on two of them. With San Diego's offense struggling to move the ball consistently, it was 28–7 early in the 3rd quarter.

San Diego were then forced to punt, but Chris Gannon recovered a Tim Brown fumble on the return. Taking over at the Raider 43, McMahon immediately hit Anthony Miller for 38 yards down the left sideline, and Butts scored from a yard out three plays later. With David Archer in at quarterback, the Chargers could add no further points. Los Angeles scored three times in quick succession in the final quarter to turn the game into a runaway: a field goal was followed by Victor Floyd muffing the kickoff, and being tackled in the end zone for a safety; the Raiders received the ensuing free kick, and added a touchdown in short order.

McMahon completed 7 of 18 passes, for 91 yards. Butts carried nine times, gaining 64 of San Diego's 171 rushing yards and scoring two touchdowns.

==== Week 2: vs. Houston Oilers ====
Week Two: Houston Oilers at San Diego Chargers – Game summary

Quarter	1	2	3	4	Total
Oilers	3	17	14	0	**34**
Chargers	7	7	0	13	**27**

at Jack Murphy Stadium, San Diego, California

- Date: September 17
- Game weather: 70 °F (21.1 °C), relative humidity 81%, wind 10 mph
- Game attendance: 42,013
- Referee: Howard Roe
- TV announcers (NBC): Tom Hammond and Joe Namath
- Box score

Game information

**First quarter**

- HOU – Tony Zendejas 24-yard field goal, 8:59. Oilers 3–0. **Drive: 10 plays, 30 yards, 5:46.**
- SDG – Anthony Miller 63-yard pass from Jim McMahon (Chris Bahr kick), 5:05. Chargers 7–3. **Drive: 4 plays, 87 yards, 1:31.**

**Second quarter**

- SDG – Marion Butts 1-yard run (Chris Bahr kick), 14:44. Chargers 14–3. **Drive: 1 play, 1 yard, 0:04.**
- HOU – Ernest Givins 14-yard pass from Warren Moon (Tony Zendejas kick), 11:18. Chargers 14–10. **Drive: 8 plays, 68 yards, 3:18.**
- HOU – Warren Moon 1-yard run (Tony Zendejas kick), 3:41. Oilers 17–14. **Drive: 2 plays, 19 yards, 1:18.**
- HOU – Tony Zendejas 32-yard field goal, 0:00. Oilers 20–14. **Drive: 6 plays, 54 yards, 1:03.**

**Third quarter**

- HOU – Drew Hill 5-yard pass from Warren Moon (Tony Zendejas kick), 11:21. Oilers 27–14. **Drive: 6 play, 35 yards, 3:27.**
- HOU – Alonzo Highsmith 16-yard run (Tony Zendejas kick), 3:16. Oilers 34–14. **Drive: 3 plays, 30 yards, 1:36.**

**Fourth quarter**

- SDG – Marion Butts 1-yard run (pass failed), 9:04. Oilers 34–20. **Drive: 11 plays, 80 yards, 6:01.**
- SDG – Anthony Miller 10-yard pass from Jim McMahon (Chris Bahr kick), 0:55. Oilers 34–27. **Drive: 12 plays, 80 yards, 2:05.**

**Top passers**

- HOU – Warren Moon – 21/35, 235 yards, 2 TD
- SDG – Jim McMahon – 27/45, 389 yards, 2 TD, 3 INT

**Top rushers**

- HOU – Alonzo Highsmith – 8 rushes, 50 yards, TD
- SDG – Rod Bernstine – 2 rushes, 24 yards

**Top receivers**

- HOU – Drew Hill – 6 receptions, 69 yards, TD
- SDG – Anthony Miller – 7 receptions, 162 yards, 2 TD

A run of 31 unanswered Oilers points proved too much for San Diego to overcome. Following a Tony Zendejas field goal, McMahon was intercepted on the Chargers' first play from scrimmage. The defense forced a punt, and Cris Dishman was flagged for unnecessary roughness to keep the next Charger drive alive. The play after the penalty, McMahon found Miller for a 63-yard touchdown. The receiver was open at the Houston 25, and wrong-footed the last defender before scoring easily. McMahon threw incomplete on 4th down in the red zone the next time San Diego had the ball, but they soon made another chance - Elvis Patterson blocked a punt, which rolled out of bounds at the Oiler's 1 yard line. Butts scored off right tackle a play later.

Down 14–3, Houston quickly retaliated when Warren Moon connected with Ernest Givins for a 14-yard touchdown. When Floyd fumbled later in the half, Moon ran the go-ahead score in himself. McMahon completed four passes on the next drive, but his throw on 2nd and 15 from the Oiler 24 was tipped and intercepted - Houston added another field goal as time expired in the half. In the 3rd quarter, a Butts fumble and McMahon interception were turned into a pair of Oiler touchdowns, giving them a 34–14 lead.

San Diego fought back in the final quarter. McMahon converted a pair of third downs with completions to Rod Bernstine and Quinn Early, before Butts scored his fourth touchdown in two games on 3rd and goal from the 1, completing an 80-yard drive. Archer botched the hold on the extra point, keeping the deficit at fourteen. Houston then recovered an onside kick and ran the clock down to only three minutes before Zendejas missed a 24-yard chip shot wide left. The Chargers again drove 80 yards for a touchdown; Miller had catches of 12 yards (to convert a 4th and 10), and 10 yards (for a touchdown, with 55 seconds to play). Lester Lyles then appeared to have recovered an onside kick for the Chargers, but after a five-minute consultation, officials ruled the ball had been illegally touched before travelling ten yards. The kick was retaken, and the Oilers recovered, clinching their win.

McMahon was 27 of 45 for 389 yards, two touchdowns and three interceptions. His completions and yardage would stand as single game career-highs. San Diego outgained Houston 413–367, but committed all five of the game's turnovers.

==== Week 3: vs. Kansas City Chiefs ====
Week Three: Kansas City Chiefs at San Diego Chargers – Game summary

Quarter	1	2	3	4	Total
Chiefs	3	3	0	0	**6**
Chargers	7	0	7	7	**21**

at Jack Murphy Stadium, San Diego, California

- Date: September 24
- Game time: 1:00 p.m. PDT
- Game weather: 87 °F (30.6 °C), relative humidity 85%, wind 10 mph
- Game attendance: 40,128
- Referee: Ben Dreith
- TV announcers (NBC): Tom Hammond and Joe Namath
- Box score

Game information

**First quarter**

- SDG – Tim Spencer 9-yard run (Chris Bahr kick), 3:57. Chargers 7–0. **Drive: 2 plays, 17 yards, 0:46.**
- KAN – Nick Lowery 23-yard field goal, 0:23. Chargers 7–3. **Drive: 9 plays, 76 yards, 3:34.**

**Second quarter**

- KAN – Nick Lowery 31-yard field goal, 1:04. Chargers 7–6. **Drive: 9 plays, 46 yards, 5:43.**

**Third quarter**

- SDG – Rod Bernstine 1-yard pass from Jim McMahon (Chris Bahr kick), 8:05. Chargers 14–6. **Drive: 11 plays, 74 yards, 6:55.**

**Fourth quarter**

- SDG – Rod Bernstine 32-yard run (Chris Bahr kick), 3:31. Chargers 21–6. **Drive: 8 plays, 78 yards, 5:13.**

**Top passers**

- KAN – Steve DeBerg – 16/28, 177 yards, 5 INT
- SDG – Jim McMahon – 11/18, 96 yards, TD

**Top rushers**

- KAN – Christian Okoye – 16 rushes, 112 yards
- SDG – Rod Bernstine – 5 rushes, 73 yards, TD

**Top receivers**

- KAN – Todd McNair – 7 receptions, 83 yards
- SDG – Anthony Miller – 2 receptions, 55 yards

San Diego intercepted Steve DeBerg five times as they posted their first win of the year. Miller's 35-yard reception gave the Chargers a 1st and goal at the 2 early on, but four straight rushing plays ended with Butts being stuffed a yard short of the goal line, turning the ball over on downs. Vencie Glenn soon gave his team another chance by intercepting a tipped pass and returning it 31 yards to the Chief 17. Tim Spencer had back-to-back carries of eight and nine yards at right tackle, the latter for a touchdown. In reply, Christian Okoye broke off a 59-yard run, setting up a field goal. Gill Byrd intercepted an underthrown bomb from DeBerg to stop a later Kansas City threat, but the Chiefs managed a further field goal, and trailed by just one point at halftime.

The Chargers opened the second half with an 11-play, 74-yard touchdown drive. Rod Bernstein, who played as both tight end and running back during the game, rushed for 12 yards early in the drive; Butts added 14-yard gains on consecutive plays, moving the ball to the 1, from where Bernstine pulled in McMahon's pass. On the next two Chief drives, Byrd had his second interception of the game, and strong safety Martin Bayless claimed his first as a Charger. San Diego's offense went three-and-out after both turnovers, and Kansas City drove into the red zone. O'Neal's third down sack forced a field goal try, and kicker Nick Lowery missed from 40 yards out to keep it a two-score game. Miller's 20-yard catch then helped San Diego move the ball to the Chief 32, from where Bernstine ran off tackle for the clinching touchdown, 3:31 from time. Lester Lyles bagged the final Charger interception shortly afterwards.

In contrast to the previous week, McMahon only passed for 96 yards, while his running game gained 200 yards on 37 carries. Bernstine (73 yards), Butts (62) and Spencer (57), split the bulk of the workload between them. San Diego won the turnover battle 5–0 a week after losing it by the same margin.

==== Week 4: at Phoenix Cardinals ====
Week Four: San Diego Chargers at Phoenix Cardinals – Game summary

Quarter	1	2	3	4	Total
Chargers	0	0	7	17	**24**
Cardinals	0	3	10	0	**13**

at Sun Devil Stadium, Tempe, Arizona

- Date: October 1
- Game time: 2:00 p.m. MDT
- Game weather: 86 °F (30.0 °C), relative humidity 21%, wind 7 mph
- Game attendance: 44,201
- Referee: Johnny Grier
- TV announcers (NBC): Jay Randolph and Lyle Alzado
- Box score

Game information

**First quarter**

- No scoring plays.

**Second quarter**

- PHX – Al Del Greco 36-yard field goal, 0:15. Cardinals 3–0. **Drive: 12 plays, 54 yards, 3:30.**

**Third quarter**

- PHX – Al Del Greco 33-yard field goal, 8:33. Cardinals 6–0. **Drive: 7 plays, 26 yards, 3:25.**
- SDG – Anthony Miller 16-yard pass from Jim McMahon (Chris Bahr kick), 6:36. Chargers 7–6. **Drive: 6 plays, 82 yards, 1:57.**
- PHX – Roy Green 59-yard pass from Gary Hogeboom (Al Del Greco kick), 5:29. Cardinals 13–7. **Drive: 2 plays, 67 yards, 1:07.**

**Fourth quarter**

- SDG – Marion Butts 2-yard run (Chris Bahr kick), 13:53. Chargers 14–13. **Drive: 12 plays, 72 yards, 6:31.**
- SDG – Billy Ray Smith 15-yard fumble return (Chris Bahr kick), 12:50. Chargers 21–13.
- SDG – Chris Bahr 37-yard field goal, 4:17. Chargers 24–13. **Drive: 4 plays, 7 yards, 0:20.**

**Top passers**

- SDG – Jim McMahon – 15/23, 188 yards, TD
- PHX – Steve Beuerlein – 22/43, 261 yards, TD, 2 INT

**Top rushers**

- SDG – Marion Butts – 9 rushes, 26 yards, TD
- PHX – Earl Ferrell – 10 rushes, 38 yards

**Top receivers**

- SDG – Anthony Miller – 3 receptions, 66 yards, TD
- PHX – J. T. Smith – 11 receptions, 123 yards

Billy Ray Smith made two critical plays as San Diego took control of a close game in the final quarter. The Charger offense was unproductive in the first half, gaining 80 yards and three first downs while punting five times. Phoenix also struggled to move the ball, but managed a 54-yard field goal drive shortly before halftime. After a second Cardinal field goal, San Diego finally sprang into life, covering 82 yards in just 6 plays - Miller's 47-yard reception moved the ball into Phoenix territory, and his 16-yard touchdown put his team ahead. Only two plays later, Gary Hogeboom threw a 57-yard bomb to Roy Green, restoring the Cardinal lead at 13–7.

McMahon had completions of 20 and 16 yards on the next drive, as well as a 14-yard carry. After his incompletion on 3rd and goal from the four, Chris Bahr came on for a field goal try. He made the kick, but Phoenix were guilty of a hold, giving San Diego a fresh set of downs. Butts scored on the next play, and the Chargers were ahead to stay, fourteen minutes from time. Two plays later, Byrd forced a fumble which Smith scooped up and returned 15 yards for a touchdown. Smith continued to make an impact as the final quarter wore on, breaking up a fourth down pass in Charger territory and recovering a second fumble to set up a field goal. The Cardinals' last big chance ended when Lee Williams sacked Hogeboom on 4th and 3 from the Charger 8, three minutes from time.

Byrd and Bennett each intercepted a pass in the game, and San Diego had a 4–0 edge in turnovers.

==== Week 5: at Denver Broncos ====
Week Five: San Diego Chargers at Denver Broncos – Game summary

Quarter	1	2	3	4	Total
Chargers	3	0	7	0	**10**
Broncos	0	6	0	10	**16**

at Mile High Stadium, Denver, Colorado

- Date: October 8
- Game time: 2:00 p.m. MDT
- Game weather: 55 °F (12.8 °C), relative humidity 34%, wind 8 mph
- Game attendance: 75,222
- Referee: Jerry Seeman
- TV announcers (NBC): Jay Randolph and Joe Namath
- Box score

Game information

**First quarter**

- SDG – Chris Bahr 39-yard field goal, 6:53. Chargers 3–0. **Drive: 13 plays, 58 yards, 8:07.**

**Second quarter**

- DEN – David Treadwell 46-yard field goal, 13:25. Tied 3–3. **Drive: 16 plays, 51 yards, 8:28.**
- DEN – David Treadwell 18-yard field goal, 1:57. Broncos 6–3. **Drive: 15 plays, 79 yards, 8:05.**

**Third quarter**

- SDG – Marion Butts 2-yard run (Chris Bahr kick), 10:18. Chargers 10–6. **Drive: 6 plays, 28 yards, 3:20.**

**Fourth quarter**

- DEN – David Treadwell 27-yard field goal, 7:51. Chargers 10–9. **Drive: 7 plays, 13 yards, 2:20.**
- DEN – Bobby Humphrey 17-yard run (David Treadwell kick), 1:03. Broncos 16–10. **Drive: 11 plays, 74 yards, 3:22.**

**Top passers**

- SDG – Jim McMahon – 10/19, 116 yards, INT
- DEN – John Elway – 19/35, 199 yards, INT

**Top rushers**

- SDG – Tim Spencer – 15 rushes, 78 yards
- DEN – Bobby Humphrey – 23 rushes, 102 yards, TD

**Top receivers**

- SDG – Rod Bernstine – 2 receptions, 45 yards
- DEN – Vance Johnson – 6 receptions, 65 yards

Given the chance to join Denver stop the AFC West, the Chargers instead slipped two games back with a narrow defeat. There were only six drives in total in the first half, with the bulk of the time being taken up by a trio of eight-minute field goal drives - one by San Diego, two by Denver. The Chargers forced a punt on the opening possession of the second half, which Dana Brinson returned 52 yards to the Bronco 28. Six plays later, Butts scored from the 2-yard line. Broncos running back Bobby Humphrey broke off a 40-yard run later in the 3rd quarter, but Byrd intercepted John Elway when he tried a long pass on the next play.

Tim Spencer lost a fumble with ten minutes to play, which Denver turned into a third field goal. After a Charger punt, Denver drove to the San Diego 37, where they faced a 4th and 1 at the two-minute warning, trailing 10–9. The Broncos converted, Elway faking a handoff up the middle and instead giving to Steve Sewell, who swept left and eluded O'Neal's dive before turning the corner and gaining seven yards. Humphrey scored the winning points two plays later with a 16-yard run. There were 57 seconds still to play, but McMahon threw two incompletions followed by a game-sealing interception.

==== Week 6: vs. Seattle Seahawks ====
Week Six: Seattle Seahawks at San Diego Chargers – Game summary

Quarter	1	2	3	4	Total
Seahawks	10	0	7	0	**17**
Chargers	7	3	0	6	**16**

at Jack Murphy Stadium, San Diego, California

- Date: October 15
- Game time: 1:00 p.m. PDT
- Game weather: 66 °F (18.9 °C), relative humidity 67%, wind 8 mph
- Game attendance: 50,079
- Referee: Red Cashion
- TV announcers (NBC): Charlie Jones and Merlin Olsen
- Box score

Game information

**First quarter**

- SDG – Arthur Cox 3-yard pass from Jim McMahon (Chris Bahr kick), 10:25. Chargers 7–0. **Drive: 8 plays, 83 yards, 4:35.**
- SEA – Curt Warner 1-yard run (Norm Johnson kick), 5:15. Tied 7–7. **Drive: 11 plays, 74 yards, 5:10.**
- SEA – Norm Johnson 50-yard field goal, 0:04. Seahawks 10–7. **Drive: 7 plays, 11 yards, 3:31.**

**Second quarter**

- SDG – Chris Bahr 29-yard field goal, 8:44. Tied 10–10. **Drive: 10 plays, 81 yards, 6:20.**

**Third quarter**

- SEA – John L. Williams 6-yard pass from Dave Krieg (Norm Johnson kick), 9:35. Seahawks 17–10. **Drive: 3 plays, 16 yards, 0:50.**

**Fourth quarter**

- SDG – Marion Butts 2-yard run (kick blocked), 4:14. Seahawks 17–16. **Drive: 10 plays, 82 yards, 4:45.**

**Top passers**

- SEA – Dave Krieg – 14/24, 139 yards, TD, 2 INT
- SDG – Jim McMahon – 25/39, 286 yards, TD, 2 INT

**Top rushers**

- SEA – John L. Williams – 11 rushes, 54 yards
- SDG – Tim Spencer – 16 rushes, 49 yards

**Top receivers**

- SEA – John L. Williams – 6 receptions, 53 yards, TD
- SDG – Anthony Miller – 7 receptions, 116 yards

Crucial blocked kicks led to a one-point loss for the Chargers. Both offenses began well: Jamie Holland drew a 39-yard pass interference penalty to account for nearly half of an 82-yard touchdown drive (Arthur Cox scoring), before Seattle drove from their own 26 all the way to a 4th and goal from the 1. Dave Krieg then threw incomplete, but Smith was called for a hold to prolong the drive, and Curt Warner scored on the next play. McMahon was then intercepted when Dana Brinson bobbled a pass, and Seattle capitalised with a field goal. Miller's 44-yard catch was the biggest play of the next drive, as San Diego went 81 yards and Chris Bahr levelled the scores at 10–10 with a 29-yard kick. Late in the first half Byrd intercepted Krieg, but McMahon lost a fumble as San Diego threatened to move into field goal range.

Brinson fumbled a punt early in the second half, and Seattle only had to drive 16 yards to take a seven-point lead. Vencie Glenn and Seahawk Eugene Robinson had interceptions on back to back plays early in the 4th quarter, before San Diego forced a punt and took over at their own 18 with nine minutes to play. They drove 82 yards in 10 plays, with rookie receiver Wayne Walker's 31-yard catch the biggest play. Butts finished the drive with a 2-yard touchdown run, but Bahr's game-tying extra point attempt was blocked by the Seahawks with 4:45 to play. San Diego had an immediate chance to make amends, as David Brandon recovered a fumble on the ensuing kickoff, but the offense backed up from the Seattle 18 to the 33, and Bahr's 51-yard attempt was met by a second block. After forcing a punt, the Chargers had one final chance, starting from their own 10 with 1:51 to play. A 43-yard catch by Walker helped them reach a 2nd and 4 at the Seattle 27, before a holding penalty backed them up. McMahon threw incomplete with 10 seconds to play, then was sacked by Rufus Porter and the clock ran out.

Miller finished with 7 catches for 116 yards.

==== Week 7: vs. New York Giants ====
Week Seven: New York Giants at San Diego Chargers – Game summary

Quarter	1	2	3	4	Total
Giants	3	3	7	7	**20**
Chargers	0	3	3	7	**13**

at Jack Murphy Stadium, San Diego, California

- Date: October 22
- Game time: 1:00 p.m. PDT
- Game weather: 68 °F (20.0 °C), relative humidity 80%, wind 8 mph
- Game attendance: 48,566
- Referee: Dale Hamer
- TV announcers (CBS): Pat Summerall and John Madden
- Box score

Game information

**First quarter**

- NYG – Raul Allegre 21-yard field goal, 8:52. Giants 3–0. **Drive: 13 plays, 72 yards, 6:08.**

**Second quarter**

- SDG – Chris Bahr 26-yard field goal, 4:01. Tied 3–3. **Drive: 11 plays, 45 yards, 5:40.**
- NYG – Raul Allegre 40-yard field goal, 0:00. Giants 6–3. **Drive: 14 plays, 56 yards, 4:01.**

**Third quarter**

- NYG – Ottis Anderson 4-yard run (Raul Allegre kick), 6:31. Giants 13–3. **Drive: 9 plays, 48 yards, 5:21.**
- SDG – Chris Bahr 30-yard field goal, 3:07. Giants 13–6. **Drive: 7 plays, 43 yards, 3:24.**

**Fourth quarter**

- NYG – Ottis Anderson 4-yard run (Raul Allegre kick), 6:30. Giants 20–6. **Drive: 12 plays, 87 yards, 7:13.**
- SDG – Vencie Glenn 81-yard fumble return (Chris Bahr kick), 2:27. Giants 20–13.

**Top passers**

- NYG – Phil Simms – 22/33, 232 yards, INT
- SDG – Jim McMahon – 12/27, 133 yards, INT

**Top rushers**

- NYG – Ottis Anderson – 27 rushes, 96 yards, 2 TD
- SDG – Tim Spencer – 11 rushes, 34 yards

**Top receivers**

- NYG – Odessa Turner – 5 receptions, 47 yards
- SDG – Darrin Nelson – 3 receptions, 38 yards

San Diego's offense was kept out of the end zone as they slipped to another defeat. The Chargers managed only two first downs on their first three drives, and trailed 3–0 midway through the 2nd quarter. McMahon kept their next drive alive with when he barely ran for enough to convert a 4th and 3 from the Giants 30, allowing Bahr to tie the scores with a 26-yard kick. New York appeared to have answered with a touchdown, but Mark Bavaro's catch was ruled out by penalty, and Raul Allegre made his second field goal as time expired in the half.

The Chargers had the ball to start the second half, but McMahon was intercepted at his own 48. Ottis Anderson had two big four-yard runs on the ensuing drive - one to convert a 4th and 1, the other for a touchdown. A field goal pulled San Diego back within seven, and a sack by Williams on Phil Simms forced the Giants to punt from near their own goal line. The Chargers took over on the New York 44, but could muster only a single yard before being forced to punt. Simms then led an 87-yard touchdown drive, and Anderson scored again with 6:28 to play. After three McMahon incompletions, a fake punt failed to fool New York, and the Giants took over in Charger territory. The San Diego defense pulled the team back into the game, Smith punching the ball free for Glenn to recover and return 81 yards for an easy touchdown with 2:19 on the clock. The Giants then went three-and-out, and San Diego had a last chance to tie, taking over at their own 46 with 1:46 still to work with. Their last drive soon stalled, however, comprising two penalties, a sack and three incompletions before New York took over on downs and ran the clock out.

San Diego were outgained 327–179. Taken together with his 103-yard interception return two seasons earlier, Glenn owned the club records for longest touchdowns on both fumble returns and interception returns up to this point.

==== Week 8: at Seattle Seahawks ====
Week Eight: San Diego Chargers at Seattle Seahawks – Game summary

Quarter	1	2	3	4	Total
Chargers	0	0	0	7	**7**
Seahawks	3	0	0	7	**10**

at Kingdome, Seattle, Washington

- Date: October 29
- Game time: 1:00 p.m. PST
- Game weather: Dome
- Game attendance: 59,691
- Referee: Gene Barth
- TV announcers (NBC): Charlie Jones and Merlin Olsen
- Box score

Game information

**First quarter**

- SEA – Norm Johnson 27-yard field goal, 2:03. Seahawks 10–7. **Drive: 9 plays, 40 yards, 3:27.**

**Second quarter**

- No scoring plays.

**Third quarter**

- No scoring plays.

**Fourth quarter**

- SDG – Arthur Cox 14-yard pass from Jim McMahon (Chris Bahr kick), 1:53. Seahawks 17–16. **Drive: 10 plays, 55 yards, 5:33.**
- SEA – Brian Blades 21-yard pass from Dave Krieg (Norm Johnson kick), 0:40. Seahawks 10–7. **Drive: 8 plays, 71 yards, 1:13.**

**Top passers**

- SDG – Jim McMahon – 9/12, 82 yards, TD
- SEA – Dave Krieg – 27/49, 311 yards, TD, 2 INT

**Top rushers**

- SDG – Marion Butts – 7 rushes, 44 yards
- SEA – Curt Warner – 15 rushes, 40 yards

**Top receivers**

- SDG – Wayne Walker – 3 receptions, 36 yards
- SEA – Brian Blades – 10 receptions, 117 yards, TD

A change at quarterback did little to spark the Chargers, as they lost a game that saw only three points scored through the first 58 minutes. Rookie Billy Joe Tolliver was given the nod over McMahon, but he led the team to only three first downs in eight possessions, as the Chargers were outgained 273–53 through three-quarters. They were kept in the game by a resilient defensive performance, with Patterson and Smith producing interceptions in their own territory, and an off day from Seattle kicker Norm Johnson, who made only one attempt out of four.

McMahon entered the game in the 4th quarter, and the offense improved. They reached Seattle territory for the first time, before a penalty on James Fitzpatrick wiped out a third down conversion, and they were forced to punt. Burt Grossman sacked Dave Krieg on the next drive, and the Chargers got the ball back in good field position at their own 45. McMahon's 22-yard pass to Miller opened the drive, and San Diego drove inside the Seattle 10 before penalties brought them to a 3rd and goal at the 14. McMahon found Arthur Cox in the end zone, the tight end diving to make the catch at full stretch. Up 7–3 with 1:53 to play, San Diego were unable to prevent a Seattle response. Krieg converted a 4th and 3 before finding Brian Blades for a 21-yard touchdown, 40 seconds from time. San Diego reached their own 46 in response, before an unusual finish - McMahon's pass was batted back to him, he caught it and was tackled at midfield as time expired.

Tolliver completed 6 of 17 passes for 41 yards and an interception. The Chargers sacked Krieg five times, with O'Neal and Grossman claiming two each.

==== Week 9: vs. Philadelphia Eagles ====
Week Nine: Philadelphia Eagles at San Diego Chargers – Game summary

Quarter	1	2	3	4	Total
Eagles	0	7	0	10	**17**
Chargers	7	0	10	3	**20**

at Jack Murphy Stadium, San Diego, California

- Date: November 5
- Game time: 1:00 p.m. PST
- Game weather: 62 °F (16.7 °C), relative humidity 82%, wind 8 mph
- Game attendance: 47,019
- Referee: Dick Jorgensen
- TV announcers (CBS): Tim Brant and Dan Jiggetts
- Box score

Game information

**First quarter**

- SDG – Anthony Miller 6-yard pass from Jim McMahon (Chris Bahr kick), 6:07. Chargers 7–0. **Drive: 14 plays, 73 yards, 5:40.**

**Second quarter**

- PHI – Gregg Garrity 4-yard pass from Randall Cunningham (Steve DeLine kick), 2:24. Tied 7–7. **Drive: 7 plays, 77 yards, 3:09.**

**Third quarter**

- SDG – Chris Bahr 23-yard field goal, 5:39. Chargers 10–7. **Drive: 7 plays, 60 yards, 3:39.**
- SDG – Anthony Miller 69-yard pass from Jim McMahon (Chris Bahr kick), 3:33. Chargers 17–7. **Drive: 1 play, 69 yards, 0:09.**

**Fourth quarter**

- PHI – Steve DeLine 43-yard field goal, 13:26. Chargers 17–10. **Drive: 10 plays, 45 yards, 5:07.**
- PHI – Keith Byars 3-yard run (Steve DeLine kick), 10:11. Tied 17–17. **Drive: 3 plays, 23 yards, 1:34.**
- SDG – Chris Bahr 49-yard field goal, 0:04. Chargers 20–17. **Drive: 7 plays, 60 yards, 1:44.**

**Top passers**

- PHI – Randall Cunningham – 19/29, 236 yards, TD, INT
- SDG – Jim McMahon – 14/29, 264 yards, 2 TD, INT

**Top rushers**

- PHI – Robert Drummond – 14 rushes, 77 yards
- SDG – Marion Butts – 16 rushes, 72 yards

**Top receivers**

- PHI – Robert Drummond – 5 receptions, 74 yards
- SDG – Anthony Miller – 5 receptions, 129 yards, 2 TD

A major stroke of luck in the final seconds helped San Diego upset the 6–2 Eagles. McMahon, restored to the starting line-up, led a 14-play, 73-yard drive on the game's opening possession, converting four third downs with pass completions. Three of these went to Miller, including a six-yard touchdown pass. Miller brought the ball in one-handed at the five, ducked out of a tackle and darted into the end zone to open the scoring. The Charger defense foiled two good Eagle chances in the 2nd quarter: Randall Cunningham fumbled a red zone snap, with Cedric Figaro recovering, and Sam Seale intercepted a third down pass at his own 23. Cunningham did manage a touchdown on the next Eagles possession, and a missed 33-yard field goal by Bahr left the scores level at halftime.

Philadelphia drove into Charger territory at the start of the second half, but Grossman sacked Cunningham on third down to force a punt. McMahon's 37-yard completion to a wide-open Joe Caravello set up a Bahr field goal and a 10–7 lead. Leslie O'Neal then forced a punt with another third down sack of Cunningham. San Diego struck on the very next play with a 69-yard touchdown by Miller. McMahon faked a handoff before finding the receiver in stride behind two defenders at the Eagle 25. After a Philadelphia field goal, McMahon's third down pass bounced off the hands of Jamie Holland and was intercepted by Eric Allen in Charger territory. Keith Byars tied the scores three plays later, with ten minutes to play.

On the next drive, McMahon converted a 3rd and 13 with a 16-yard pass to Walker; the Chargers reached the edge of field goal range before Brinson lost a fumble at the Eagle 35. Philadelphia reached a 3rd and 1 at the San Diego 44 in response, but Grossman made a tackle for no gain, and the Eagles opted to punt with two minutes left. San Diego took over at their own 9-yard line, and faced a 2nd and 14 after an incompletion and a penalty. Butts then broke off consecutive gains of 13 and 6 yards to keep the drive alive. On the next play, McMahon and Walker teamed on a 49-yard completion up the right sideline. Two plays later, Bahr came in to attempt a 44-yard game-winner. He missed wide left, but Fitzpatrick had committed a false start penalty, negating the play. Given a second chance from 49 yards, Bahr was successful with four seconds to play.

Miller had 5 catches for 129 yards and two touchdowns. O'Neal was credited with 3 1/2 out of 5 Charger sacks on the day.

==== Week 10: vs. Los Angeles Raiders ====
Week Ten: Los Angeles Raiders at San Diego Chargers – Game summary

Quarter	1	2	3	4	Total
Raiders	3	6	3	0	**12**
Chargers	0	0	7	7	**14**

at Jack Murphy Stadium, San Diego, California

- Date: November 12
- Game time: 5:00 p.m. PST
- Game weather: 64 °F (17.8 °C), relative humidity 80%, wind 9 mph
- Game attendance: 59,151
- Referee: Jerry Markbreit
- TV announcers (ESPN): Mike Patrick and Joe Theismann
- Box score

Game information

**First quarter**

- RAI – Jeff Jaeger 23-yard field goal, 8:10. Raiders 3–0. **Drive: 8 plays, 37 yards, 3:48.**

**Second quarter**

- RAI – Jeff Jaeger 36-yard field goal, 13:03. Raiders 6–0. **Drive: 8 plays, 40 yards, 1:58.**
- RAI – Jeff Jaeger 33-yard field goal, 0:15. Raiders 9–0. **Drive: 6 plays, 36 yards, 0:37.**

**Third quarter**

- RAI – Jeff Jaeger 32-yard field goal, 5:26. Raiders 12–0. **Drive: 11 plays, 42 yards, 7:33.**
- SDG – Anthony Miller 91-yard kickoff return (Chris Bahr kick), 5:10. Raiders 12–7.

**Fourth quarter**

- SDG – Tim Spencer 5-yard run (Chris Bahr kick), 8:48. Chargers 14–12. **Drive: 4 plays, 23 yards, 2:14.**

**Top passers**

- RAI – Jay Schroeder – 12/25, 173 yards, 3 INT
- SDG – Jim McMahon – 9/20, 88 yards, INT

**Top rushers**

- RAI – Bo Jackson – 21 rushes, 103 yards
- SDG – Tim Spencer – 10 rushes, 59 yards, TD

**Top receivers**

- RAI – Willie Gault – 5 receptions, 88 yards
- SDG – Anthony Miller – 5 receptions, 54 yards

Two big special teams plays sparked San Diego to another win. Los Angeles kicker Jeff Jaeger kicked the first of four Raider field goals in the 1st quarter. The Chargers were poised to tie the scores after driving inside the Los Angeles 10-yard line, but a botched snap prevented Bahr from attempting his kick; the Raiders drove 40 yards the other way for another Jaeger kick and a 6–0 lead. A McMahon bomb was then intercepted, but Raider quarterback Jay Schroeder also struggled, with Elvis Patterson and Roy Bennett picking off passes in Charger territory. After Bennett's interception, San Diego reached a 4th and 1 at the Los Angeles 43 - they went for the conversion, but McMahon was sacked, and Jaeger field goals either side of halftime pushed the Raider lead to 12–0.

Anthony Miller then produced a game-changing play, fielding a kickoff at his own 9, cutting to the right sideline and racing untouched for a 91-yard touchdown. Shortly afterwards, a Sam Seale interception set the Chargers up in Raider territory - they reached a first down at the eleven before Tim Spencer swept around right end and lost a fumble a yard from the goal line. The defense forced a punt which Ken Woodard partially blocked, and Figaro returned 14 yards to the 23. Given a second chance, Spencer caught an 8-yard pass, and followed up with carries of 4, 6 and 5 yards to give his side the lead, 8:38 from time. Schroeder appeared to have moved the Raiders into field goal range on the next drive, but his 19-yard scramble to the 22 was wiped out by penalty. O'Neal then sacked Schroeder, and the Raiders were forced to punt. San Diego ran out the last 4:21 of the clock, with Anthony Allen's 11-yard catch and Spencer's 9-yard run converting a pair of 3rd and 6 situations.

McMahon completed 9 of 20 passes for just 88 yards and an interception.

==== Week 11: at Pittsburgh Steelers ====
Week Eleven: San Diego Chargers at Pittsburgh Steelers – Game summary

Quarter	1	2	3	4	Total
Chargers	0	7	10	0	**17**
Steelers	3	3	7	7	**20**

at Three Rivers Stadium, Pittsburgh, Pennsylvania

- Date: November 19
- Game time: 1:00 p.m. EST
- Game weather: 28 °F (−2.2 °C), relative humidity 61%, wind 12 mph, wind chill 18
- Game attendance: 44,203
- Referee: Bob McElwee
- TV announcers (NBC): Joel Meyers and Paul Maguire
- Box score

Game information

**First quarter**

- PIT – Gary Anderson 49-yard field goal, 9:25. Steelers 3–0. **Drive: 5 plays, 16 yards, 1:49.**

**Second quarter**

- SDG – Anthony Miller 20-yard pass from Jim McMahon (Chris Bahr kick), 11:53. Chargers 7–3. **Drive: 9 plays, 79 yards, 4:09.**
- PIT – Gary Anderson 28-yard field goal, 0:50. Chargers 7–6. **Drive: 15 plays, 48 yards, 4:53.**

**Third quarter**

- SDG – Chris Bahr 27-yard field goal, 7:31. Chargers 10–6. **Drive: 13 plays, 61 yards, 7:29.**
- PIT – Rod Woodson 84-yard kickoff return (Gary Anderson kick), 7:14. Steelers 13–10.
- SDG – Anthony Miller 19-yard pass from Jim McMahon (Chris Bahr kick), 2:32. Chargers 17–13. **Drive: 9 plays, 68 yards, 4:42.**

**Fourth quarter**

- PIT – Merril Hoge 1-yard run (Gary Anderson kick), 6:17. Steelers 20–17. **Drive: 12 plays, 91 yards, 5:25.**

**Top passers**

- SDG – Jim McMahon – 19/36, 226 yards, 2 TD, INT
- PIT – Bubby Brister – 12/27, 142 yards

**Top rushers**

- SDG – Tim Spencer – 22 rushes, 87 yards
- PIT – Tim Worley – 17 rushes, 53 yards

**Top receivers**

- SDG – Anthony Miller – 7 receptions, 104 yards, 2 TD
- PIT – Mike Mularkey – 2 receptions, 34 yards

In a reversal from the previous week, San Diego fell victim to a kickoff return touchdown and lost despite an excellent defensive performance. Both Lester Lyles and Dana Brinson fumbled punts in the opening quarter, but the Chargers trailed only 3–0 after Tim Worley fumbled through the end zone on one drive, and on another was stopped by Gary Plummer for no gain on 4th and 1 from the San Diego 22. After that, the Chargers took the lead with a 79-yard touchdown drive that spanned the 1st and 2nd quarters. McMahon found Holland for 25 yards to move into Steeler territory, and Spencer converted a 4th and 1 with a 6-yard carry. On the next play, Miller caught a 20-yard touchdown pass over the middle. Pittsburgh later pulled three points back on a drive that saw Figaro flagged for running into the punter. San Diego reached the Steeler 25 with six seconds left in the half, but risked running another play and the clock ran out as McMahon threw incomplete.

San Diego drove 61 yards in 13 plays to open the 3rd quarter, running over seven minutes off the clock and going up 10–6 through a Bahr field goal. On the ensuing kickoff, Rod Woodson cut to the left sideline and outran the Charger coverage team for an 84-yard touchdown. The Chargers came straight back with a 68-yard touchdown drive. During the drive, a penalty left them facing a 2nd and 20 from the Steeler 39. On the next three plays, Miller had catches of 18 yards, 2 yards to pick up a first down, and 19 yards for the touchdown after McMahon bought time by rolling to his right. Following an exchange of punts, Pittsburgh drove all the way from their own 9-yard line to a 1st and goal at the Charger 1. After three runs netted zero yards, Merril Hoge took the ball up the middle on fourth down, easily scoring with 6:17 to play. The Chargers reached 2nd and 5 at the Steeler 42 in response, but McMahon threw an interception straight to David Little with 2:22 on the clock. San Diego's final possession consisted of a false start, a sack, and three incompletions.

San Diego outgained Pittsburgh 359–191. Miller caught 7 passes for 104 yards and two touchdowns.

==== Week 12: at Indianapolis Colts ====
Week Twelve: San Diego Chargers at Indianapolis Colts – Game summary

Quarter	1	2	3	4	Total
Chargers	0	3	0	3	**6**
Colts	0	3	0	7	**10**

at Hoosier Dome, Indianapolis, Indiana

- Date: November 26
- Game time: 1:00 p.m. EST
- Game weather: Dome
- Game attendance: 58,822
- Referee: Gordon McCarter
- TV announcers (NBC): Joel Meyers and Paul Maguire
- Box score

Game information

**First quarter**

- No scoring plays.

**Second quarter**

- SDG – Chris Bahr 33-yard field goal, 10:39. Chargers 3–0. **Drive: 11 plays, 42 yards, 5:08.**
- IND – Dean Biasucci 22-yard field goal, 0:54. Tied 3–3. **Drive: 6 plays, 74 yards, 1:24.**

**Third quarter**

- No scoring plays.

**Fourth quarter**

- SDG – Chris Bahr 33-yard field goal, 3:41. Chargers 6–3. **Drive: 4 plays, -8 yards, 2:15.**
- IND – Bill Brooks 25-yard pass from Jack Trudeau (Dean Biasucci kick), 1:54. Colts 10–6. **Drive: 6 plays, 87 yards, 1:47.**

**Top passers**

- SDG – Jim McMahon – 18/32, 173 yards
- IND – Jack Trudeau – 14/24, 153 yards, TD, INT

**Top rushers**

- SDG – Tim Spencer – 20 rushes, 78 yards
- IND – Eric Dickerson – 17 rushes, 30 yards

**Top receivers**

- SDG – Jamie Holland – 4 receptions, 58 yards
- IND – Bill Brooks – 8 receptions, 101 yards, TD

As they had done in Seattle earlier in the season, San Diego lost to a late touchdown despite conceding only ten points in the game. After an early exchange of punts, O'Neal forced Eric Dickerson to fumble, with Les Miller recovering at the Indianapolis 25. However, Darrin Nelson fumbled the ball back to the Colts only two plays later. Later, Glenn intercepted Justin Trudeau at the Charger 43, and San Diego managed to get close enough for Bahr to open the scoring with a 33-yard kick. Indianapolis kicked a field goal of their own before halftime, and the scores stayed level through the 3rd quarter, with Bahr missing from 44 yards out.

San Diego began a 14-play drive on the final play of the 3rd quarter, moving from their own 22 to the Colt 6, with Holland's 33-yard catch the biggest play. They set up to attempt a field goal on fourth and goal, but a bad snap forced holder David Archer to try a pass, which fell incomplete. The Charger defense then forced a three-and-out; Phil McConkey returned the punt 20 yards to the 24, and a facemask penalty moved the ball to the 12-yard line. McMahon found Nelson for a touchdown on third down, but Anthony Miller was flagged for offensive pass interference, and San Diego had to settle for Bahr's 38-yard kick with 3:41 to play. The Colt offense then awoke, gaining 87 of their game total of 264 yards on a six-play touchdown drive, Trudeau hitting Bill Brooks for a 25-yard score with 1:54 left. Needing a touchdown, San Diego began their reply on their own 31, and gained nine yards on three plays before McMahon threw incomplete.

McMahon finished 18 of 33 for 173 yards, while being sacked five times. He was benched for the final four games of the season, and did not play for the Chargers again.

==== Week 13: vs. New York Jets ====
Week Thirteen: New York Jets at San Diego Chargers – Game summary

Quarter	1	2	3	4	Total
Jets	7	0	0	13	**20**
Chargers	0	7	3	7	**17**

at Jack Murphy Stadium, San Diego, California

- Date: December 3
- Game time: 1:00 p.m. PST
- Game weather: 65 °F (18.3 °C), relative humidity 19%, wind 9 mph
- Game attendance: 38,954
- Referee: Tom Dooley
- TV announcers (NBC): Joel Meyers and Paul Maguire
- Box score

Game information

**First quarter**

- NYJ – Johnny Hector 9-yard pass from Ken O'Brien (Pat Leahy kick), 2:20. Jets 7–0. **Drive: 7 plays, 47 yards, 3:12.**

**Second quarter**

- SDG – Marion Butts 40-yard run (Chris Bahr kick), 5:01. Tied 7–7. **Drive: 1 play, 40 yards, 0:10.**

**Third quarter**

- SDG – Chris Bahr 39-yard field goal, 2:07. Chargers 10–7. **Drive: 10 plays, 50 yards, 3:28.**

**Fourth quarter**

- NYJ – Roger Vick 1-yard run (Pat Leahy kick), 9:19. Jets 14–10. **Drive: 7 plays, 47 yards, 3:37.**
- NYJ – Roger Vick 14-yard run (kick failed), 7:55. Jets 20–10. **Drive: 2 plays, 16 yards, 0:52.**
- SDG – Anthony Miller 8-yard pass from Billy Joe Tolliver (Chris Bahr kick), 3:25. Jets 20–17. **Drive: 3 plays, 49 yards, 0:58.**

**Top passers**

- NYJ – Ken O'Brien – 9/20, 81 yards, TD, INT
- SDG – Billy Joe Tolliver – 24/51, 230 yards, TD, 2 INT

**Top rushers**

- NYJ – Johnny Hector – 20 rushes, 106 yards
- SDG – Marion Butts – 5 rushes, 42 yards, TD

**Top receivers**

- NYJ – Al Toon – 7 receptions, 57 yards
- SDG – Anthony Miller – 7 receptions, 70 yards, TD

Billy Joe Tolliver replaced McMahon as starting quarterback, but the result was another narrow defeat. After Johnny Hector had scored the opening touchdown for the Jets, Jamie Holland ran the ensuing kickoff back 34 yards, then drew a 31-yard pass interference penalty that moved the ball to the New York 20-yard line. Tolliver was intercepted two plays later, and San Diego came up empty handed. Butts was later stuffed on a 4th and 1 try, but tied the scores in five minutes before halftime with a 40-yard run. He burst up the middle and shrugged off four tacklers en route to his first touchdown since week 6.

In the 3rd quarter, Lester Lyles stopped a dangerous drive with a one-handed interception, and Anthony Miller's 30-yard reception helped set up a 39-yard Bahr field goal. Roger Vick scored a pair of touchdowns in the final quarter, either side of another Tolliver interception. Down 20–10, the Chargers were forced to punt with barely six minutes to play, but got a break when Vick fumbled, with O'Neal recovering at the New York 49. Tolliver led his team on a quick touchdown drive, finding Miller for a 5-yard score with 3:25 to play. After a Jets three-and-out, Tolliver completed five consecutive passes, positioning Bahr for a 37-yard field goal with 13 seconds left. The kick skewed far to the right of the posts, costing San Diego a chance to win in overtime.

Seale, Byrd and Lyles all had interceptions for San Diego. Williams had two of the defense's five sacks.

==== Week 14: at Washington Redskins ====
Week Fourteen: San Diego Chargers at Washington Redskins – Game summary

Quarter	1	2	3	4	Total
Chargers	14	0	0	7	**21**
Redskins	0	7	9	10	**26**

at Robert F. Kennedy Memorial Stadium, Washington, DC

- Date: December 10
- Game time: 1:00 p.m. EST
- Game weather: 27 °F (−2.8 °C), relative humidity 55%, wind 12 mph, wind chill 17
- Game attendance: 47,693
- Referee: Howard Roe
- TV announcers (NBC): Dick Enberg and Bill Walsh
- Box score

Game information

**First quarter**

- SDG – Anthony Miller 25-yard pass from Billy Joe Tolliver (Chris Bahr kick), 11:34. Chargers 7–0. **Drive: 6 plays, 78 yards, 3:26.**
- SDG – Wayne Walker 5-yard pass from Billy Joe Tolliver (Chris Bahr kick), 2:54. Chargers 14–0. **Drive: 9 plays, 80 yards, 4:33.**

**Second quarter**

- WAS – Ricky Sanders 45-yard pass from Mark Rypien (Chip Lohmiller kick), 0:15. Chargers 14–7. **Drive: 7 plays, 93 yards, 1:29.**

**Third quarter**

- WAS – Chip Lohmiller 38-yard field goal, 11:04. Chargers 14–10. **Drive: 8 plays, 44 yards, 3:56.**
- WAS – Chip Lohmiller 31-yard field goal, 6:29. Chargers 14–13. **Drive: 9 plays, 40 yards, 3:24.**
- WAS – Chip Lohmiller 32-yard field goal, 2:07. Redskins 16–14. **Drive: 9 plays, 47 yards, 3:00.**

**Fourth quarter**

- SDG – Marion Butts 10-yard run (Chris Bahr kick), 8:04. Chargers 21–16. **Drive: 8 plays, 61 yards, 4:19.**
- WAS – Gary Clark 33-yard pass from Mark Rypien (Chip Lohmiller kick), 7:27. Redskins 23–21. **Drive: 4 plays, 39 yards, 0:37.**
- WAS – Chip Lohmiller 28-yard field goal, 3:22. Redskins 26–21. **Drive: 6 plays, 2 yards, 3:51.**

**Top passers**

- SDG – Billy Joe Tolliver – 24/39, 350 yards, 2 TD
- WAS – Mark Rypien – 23/39, 302 yards, 2 TD, INT

**Top rushers**

- SDG – Marion Butts – 22 rushes, 72 yards, TD
- WAS – Earnest Byner – 16 rushes, 60 yards

**Top receivers**

- SDG – Anthony Miller – 8 receptions, 152 yards, TD
- WAS – Ricky Sanders – 4 receptions, 98 yards, TD

An excellent start came to nothing as San Diego lost for the eighth time in ten games. The Chargers took the opening kickoff and drove 78 yards in 6 plays, with Tolliver and Miller combining for a 49-yard gain and a 25-yard touchdown. After forcing a punt, they drove 80 yards in 9 plays - this time, Walker made the big plays, with a 43-yard catch and a 4-yard touchdown. A Byrd interception helped keep Washington at bay until shortly before halftime, when Byrd was beaten by Ricky Sanders for a 45-yard touchdown catch.

Washington had three consecutive field goal drives in the 3rd quarter, while the Chargers twice went three-and-out. Down 16–14, San Diego improved in the final quarter. Tolliver found Nelson for 32 yards on 3rd and 7, and Butts scored from the 10 with 8:04 to play. The lead lasted only 37 seconds, as Washington followed a 51-yard kickoff return with a 33-yard touchdown pass from Mark Rypien to Gary Clark on 4th and 4. Soon afterwards, a bad exchange on the snap between Center Courtney Hall and Tolliver led to a fumble that Washington recovered, and turned into another field goal. San Diego's final drive began on their own 30 with 3:22 to play, and took them to a 4th and 3 from the Washington 6 with 83 seconds left. Tolliver's final pass was knocked away from Walker, and Washington ran out the clock.

The Chargers gained a season-high 427 yards. Tolliver was 24 of 39 for 350 yards and two touchdowns. Miller had 8 catches for 152 yards and a touchdown, while Walker caught 7 for 105 yards and a touchdown.

==== Week 15: at Kansas City Chiefs ====
Week Fifteen: San Diego Chargers at Kansas City Chiefs – Game summary

Quarter	1	2	3	4	Total
Chargers	0	7	3	10	**20**
Chiefs	0	13	0	0	**13**

at Arrowhead Stadium, Kansas City, Missouri

- Date: December 17
- Game time: 1:00 p.m. EST
- Game weather: 11 °F (−11.7 °C), relative humidity 67%, wind 11 mph, wind chill -3
- Game attendance: 40,623
- Referee: Jerry Seeman
- TV announcers (NBC): Joel Meyers and Paul Maguire
- Box score

Game information

**First quarter**

- No scoring plays.

**Second quarter**

- KAN – Nick Lowery 36-yard field goal, 10:20. Chiefs 3–0. **Drive: 7 plays, 22 yards, 2:01.**
- KAN – Nick Lowery 30-yard field goal, 5:40. Chiefs 6–0. **Drive: 4 plays, 4 yards, 2:14.**
- KAN – Todd McNair 11-yard pass from Steve DeBerg (Nick Lowery kick), 1:45. Chiefs 13–0. **Drive: 5 plays, 76 yards, 0:49.**
- SDG – Andy Parker 1-yard pass from Billy Joe Tolliver (Chris Bahr kick), 0:17. Chiefs 13–7. **Drive: 8 plays, 68 yards, 1:23.**

**Third quarter**

- SDG – Chris Bahr 43-yard field goal, 6:26. Chiefs 13–10. **Drive: 11 plays, 61 yards, 5:18.**

**Fourth quarter**

- SDG – Anthony Miller 5-yard pass from Billy Joe Tolliver (Chris Bahr kick), 14:56. Chargers 17–13. **Drive: 9 plays, 80 yards, 3:03.**
- SDG – Chris Bahr 20-yard field goal, 8:41. Chargers 20–13. **Drive: 9 plays, 44 yards, 5:17.**

**Top passers**

- SDG – Billy Joe Tolliver – 13/30, 171 yards, 2 TD, INT
- KAN – Steve DeBerg – 14/33, 142 yards, TD, 2 INT

**Top rushers**

- SDG – Marion Butts – 39 rushes, 176 yards
- KAN – Christian Okoye – 18 rushes, 60 yards

**Top receivers**

- SDG – Anthony Miller – 5 receptions, 93 yards, TD
- KAN – Stephone Paige – 4 receptions, 42 yards

A standout performance by Marion Butts led the Chargers to a sweep of the playoff-chasing Chiefs. San Diego produced an error-riddled first half, with Tolliver throwing an interception, and both Tolliver and Walker losing fumbles. The Chiefs turned two of these turnovers into field goals, and added a touchdown after Bahr missed a 42-yard field goal. Down 13–0 with 1:45 left in the half, Tolliver got the offense moving, with completions on three consecutive plays covering 66 yards. Three plays later, he found tight end Andy Parker for a 1-yard touchdown with 17 seconds on the clock.

San Diego maintained their momentum after the break. Nelson's 27-yard carry was the longest play of a 61-yard drive, ending in a field goal. After a Chiefs punt, the Chargers drove 80 yards in 9 plays to take the lead. Butts carried 5 times for 45 yards on the drive, while Miller had a 25-yard reception and a 5-yard touchdown catch. When Bahr hit his second field goal of the game on the following drive, San Diego had scored on four consecutive possessions, and led by seven points with 8:43 to play. After a Chief punt, Butts lost a fumble at his own 36-yard line, but Lyles sacked Steve DeBerg for a 10-yard loss and Kansas City were forced to punt again. The Chiefs had one more possession, converting a fourth down as they drove from their own 36 to the Charger 19, but Bennett intercepted DeBerg in the end zone with 12 seconds to play.

Butts ran 39 times for 176 yards, both of which proved to be career highs.

==== Week 16: vs. Denver Broncos ====
Week Sixteen: Denver Broncos at San Diego Chargers – Game summary

Quarter	1	2	3	4	Total
Broncos	0	7	3	6	**16**
Chargers	0	6	3	10	**19**

at Jack Murphy Stadium, San Diego, California

- Date: December 24
- Game time: 1:00 p.m. PST
- Game weather: 63 °F (17.2 °C), relative humidity 30%, wind 7 mph
- Game attendance: 50,524
- Referee: Tom White
- TV announcers (NBC): Charlie Jones and Merlin Olsen
- Box score

Game information

**First quarter**

- No scoring plays.

**Second quarter**

- SDG – Chris Bahr 22-yard field goal, 8:29. Chargers 3–0. **Drive: 16 plays, 68 yards, 8:27.**
- DEN – Bobby Humphrey 12-yard pass from John Elway (David Treadwell kick), 5:56. Broncos 7–3. **Drive: 8 plays, 72 yards, 2:33.**
- SDG – Chris Bahr 41-yard field goal, 0:25. Broncos 7–6. **Drive: 11 plays, 64 yards, 1:31.**

**Third quarter**

- SDG – Chris Bahr 53-yard field goal, 12:43. Chargers 9–7. **Drive: 4 plays, 5 yards, 1:25.**
- DEN – David Treadwell 24-yard field goal, 6:15. Broncos 10–9. **Drive: 6 plays, 22 yards, 6:28.**

**Fourth quarter**

- SDG – Tim Spencer 1-yard run (Chris Bahr kick), 7:34. Chargers 16–10. **Drive: 11 plays, 81 yards, 5:45.**
- DEN – Jeff Alexander 1-yard run (kick failed), 0:35. Tied 16–16. **Drive: 2 plays, 41 yards, 0:56.**
- SDG – Chris Bahr 45-yard field goal, 0:00. Chargers 19–16. **Drive: 5 plays, 45 yards, 0:31.**

**Top passers**

- DEN – Gary Kubiak – 12/17, 97 yards, INT
- SDG – Billy Joe Tolliver – 22/48, 305 yards, 4 INT

**Top rushers**

- DEN – Bobby Humphrey – 15 rushes, 51 yards
- SDG – Anthony Miller – 3 rushes, 38 yards

**Top receivers**

- DEN – Vance Johnson – 5 receptions, 38 yards
- SDG – Darrin Nelson – 6 receptions, 92 yards

San Diego overcame six turnovers to beat the playoff-bound Broncos. Butts converted a 4th and 1 in the 2nd quarter, and Bahr put the Chargers up 3–0. Denver, who had clinched the #1 seed in the AFC, pulled John Elway after he had thrown a touchdown to Bobby Humphrey in response. Shortly before halftime, Miller had catches of 18 and 15 yards, while also gaining 24 yards on an end-around, enabling Bahr to pull it back to 7–6. Tolliver was intercepted three times in the first half, but none of those turnovers led to Denver points.

Glenn intercepted Denver backup Gary Kubiak at the Bronco 40 two plays into the 3rd quarter. San Diego only drove five yards from there, but Bahr tied the club record for longest field goal with a 53-yarder. McConkey fumbled a punt shortly afterwards, and Denver went back ahead with a field goal of their own. Denver were back in Charger territory on their next drive, but O'Neal forced and recovered a fumble from Humphrey. Tolliver was intercepted again shortly afterwards, but made amends on the next Charger drive. Starting from his own 19, Tolliver converted a 3rd and 7 with a 14-yard pass to Nelson, then went deep and found the same player for 49 yards. The pair combined again to convert a 3rd and 9 with a 10-yard gain, bringing up 1st and goal from the 4. Three plays later, Spencer scored on 4th and goal from the 1 for a 16–10 lead midway through the final quarter.

Following an exchange of punts, Denver drove to the Charger 29 before O'Neal's fourth down sack stopped them with under two minutes to play. Three plays later, Miller fumbled on a reverse, then Glenn was twice flagged for pass interference and Denver tied the score with 35 seconds left (a failed conversion kept them from taking the lead). Tolliver then completed passes to four different receivers, moving the ball from the Charger 28 to the Bronco 27. From there, Bahr made a 45-yard field goal as time expired.

San Diego had seven sacks in total. Tolliver was 22 of 48 for 305 yards, while becoming the first Charger quarterback to win while throwing no touchdowns and four interceptions.

=== Standings ===
AFC West
	W	L	T	PCT	DIV	CONF	PF	PA	STK
^{(1)} Denver Broncos	11	5	0	.688	6–2	9–3	362	226	L1
Kansas City Chiefs	8	7	1	.531	3–5	6–7–1	318	286	W1
Los Angeles Raiders	8	8	0	.500	3–5	6–6	315	297	L2
Seattle Seahawks	7	9	0	.438	4–4	7–5	241	327	L1
San Diego Chargers	6	10	0	.375	4–4	4–8	266	290	W2

== Awards ==
Three Chargers were selected for the 1990 Pro Bowl, with Lee Williams also named a 2nd-team All-Pro by the Associated Press.

Player	Position	Pro Bowl starter	Pro Bowl reserve	AP 1st team All-Pro	AP 2nd team All-Pro
Anthony Miller	Wide receiver	Yes			
Leslie O'Neal	Linebacker	Yes			
Lee Williams	Defensive end	Yes			Yes
