= Putzier =

Putzier is a surname. Notable people with the surname include:

- Jan Henner Putzier (born 1984), German politician
- Jeb Putzier (born 1979), American football player
- Rollin Putzier (born 1965), American football player
