= Blaine Bennett =

American football player and coach

Current position
- Title: Head coach
- Team: Post Falls HS (IS)

Biographical details
- Born: c. 1964
- Education: Whitworth (1987, Bachelor's); Washington State (1990, Master's)

Playing career
- 1983–1984: Idaho
- 1985–1987: Whitworth
- Position: Quarterback

Coaching career (HC unless noted)
- 1995–2000: Western Oregon
- 2001–2005: Purdue (QB/RC)
- 2006: Michigan State (AHC/WR)
- 2007: Jefferson HS (IN)
- 2008–2012: Central Washington
- 2016–present: Post Falls HS (IS)

Head coaching record
- Overall: 68–48 (college)
- Tournaments: 0–1 (NAIA playoffs); 2–2 (NCAA D-II playoffs)

Accomplishments and honors

Championships
- 1 CFA (1997); 4 GNAC (2008–2010, 2012)

Blaine Bennett (born c. 1964) is an American former football player and coach. He is the head football coach at Post Falls High School in Post Falls, Idaho, a position he has held since 2016. Bennett served as the head football coach at Western Oregon University from 1995 to 2000 and at Central Washington University from 2008 to 2012, compiling a career college football coaching record of 68–48.

== Head coaching record ==
=== College ===
Year	Team	Overall	Conference	Standing	Bowl/playoffs	NAIA^{#}	AFCA^{°}
Western Oregon Wolves (Columbia Football Association) (1995–2000)
1995	Western Oregon	2–7	1–4	T–5th (Mount Rainier)			
1996	Western Oregon	3–7	2–3	T–4th			
1997	Western Oregon	7–3	4–1	1st	L NAIA First Round	12	
1998	Western Oregon	4–5	3–2	T–2nd			
1999	Western Oregon	5–5	3–1	2nd			
2000	Western Oregon	6–5	2–2	3rd			
Western Oregon:		27–32	15–13				
Central Washington Wildcats (Great Northwest Athletic Conference) (2008–2012)
2008	Central Washington	10–2	8–0	1st	L NCAA Division II First Round		13
2009	Central Washington	12–1	6–0	1st	L NCAA Division II Quarterfinal		3
2010	Central Washington	8–3	7–1	T–1st			
2011	Central Washington	4–6	4–4	3rd			
2012	Central Washington	7–4	7–3	1st			
Central Washington:		41–16	32–8				
Total:		68–48					
National championship Conference title Conference division title or championship game berth
