= Joe Tofflemire =

American football player (1965–2011)

No. 56
- Position: Center

Personal information
- Born: July 7, 1965; Los Angeles, California, U.S.
- Died: September 27, 2011 (aged 46); Coeur d'Alene, Idaho, U.S.
- Listed height: 6 ft 3 in (1.91 m)
- Listed weight: 273 lb (124 kg)

Career information
- High school: Post Falls (Post Falls, Idaho)
- College: Arizona
- NFL draft: 1989: 2nd round, 44th overall pick

Career history
- Seattle Seahawks (1989–1994)

Awards and highlights
- Morris Trophy (1988); 2× First-team All-Pac-10 (1987, 1988); Second-team All-Pac-10 (1985)

Career NFL statistics
- Games played: 33
- Games started: 16
- Stats at Pro Football Reference

Joseph Salvatore Tofflemire (July 7, 1965 – September 27, 2011) was an American professional football player who was a center for the Seattle Seahawks of the National Football League (NFL). He played college football for the Arizona Wildcats and was selected by the Seahawks in the second round of the 1989 NFL draft.

== Early life ==
Tofflemire was a 1984 graduate of Post Falls High School in Post Falls, Idaho, where he was a four-year letterman in both track and football, and was inducted into the inaugural PFHS Hall of Fame, along with his best friend Rollin Putzier, who also was a lineman in the NFL. Joe set school records in both the shot-put and discus medaling at the Idaho state championships as well as being part of the sprint relay teams.

Tofflemire was a standout in football in which he was named to multiple all-state and all-star teams as a lineman and during his senior year he was honored as the Idaho Offensive Lineman of the year.

Highly recruited by many Division I teams, Tofflemire accepted a full-ride scholarship to the University of Arizona in Tucson.

In addition to being a standout lineman, he was also an All Intermountain League First-team kicker his junior and senior seasons. He kicked a 44-yard field goal his junior year in a state A-2 playoff game versus Bishop Kelly which at that time was an Idaho high school state record. He wore a size 15, black SpotBilt square toe kicking shoe and was given the name "Joe the Toe" by assistant coach Steve Long during a practice session. The nickname stuck, and throughout his life he was referred to by former high school, college, and pro teammates simply as "Toe." With a powerful leg, he could regularly kick the football through the uprights on kickoffs. Joe started off being a chubby place kicker and was moved up to the varsity team his freshman year as a kicker. After his sophomore season, he became dedicated to weight training.

== College career ==
Tofflemire was a 1989 graduate of the University of Arizona in Tucson, starting all four years at the position of Center becoming the best in Wildcat history. Originally recruited as a linebacker, he was quickly converted back to center, which is what he played in high school. Tofflemire was a first-team Playboy All-American and first-team College Football News (CFN) All-American in 1988, and was second-team All-American selection for CFN in 1986 and 1987. The 1988 Playboy team along with Tofflemire featured Barry Sanders, Troy Aikman, Deion Sanders, and Derrick Thomas, all in the Pro Football Hall of Fame.

Tofflemire is one of the most decorated lineman in Arizona football history, and one of the most decorated in Pac-10 history. He was inducted into the University of Arizona Hall of Fame in 1994, named to the Wildcat Stadium Ring of Honor in 1997, and is ranked as the #7 all time player in Arizona football history. Tofflemire was a Morris Trophy winner in 1988, and a three time All-Pac-10 first-team selection his sophomore thru senior seasons, and selected as second-team his freshman season.

== Professional career ==
Tofflemire was selected in the second round of the 1989 NFL draft (44th overall) by the Seattle Seahawks. He started all 16 games for the Seahawks in 1992 after taking over at center for Grant Feasel. Tofflemire was hurt the following year and was ultimately replaced by Ray Donaldson as the starter and the rest of his NFL career was plagued by injuries. He retired after the 1994 season, not wanting to take a salary cut, putting an end to what many had thought would be a great NFL career coming out of college.

== Personal life ==
Born in Los Angeles, Tofflemire grew up in Post Falls, Idaho, as one of eight siblings born to John and Anna Tofflemire. He had two sons: Michael, who played football at Weber State, and Johnny.

== Death ==
Tofflemire died in 2011 at age 46 in Coeur d'Alene, Idaho, after being found unconscious and unresponsive in his Post Falls home. According to his brother Paul, the cause of death was heart failure. Also according to Paul, Joe was never healthy again after being in the NFL after having many surgeries and complications from his injuries sustained while playing.

Tofflemire injured a shoulder at Arizona that suffered further pounding in the pros. There would be nine surgeries for that, over time, including a replacement. Four screws were implanted to keep his spine in place. Concussions, not remotely the red flag they are now, were sustained and likely unreported.

"These things impacted the rest of his life," Paul Tofflemire said. "He was always in pain. He couldn't be active and his weight was up to 300 pounds [140 kg] plus. The sad thing was watching him get out of bed. I felt so bad – this guy was so active and agile when he was younger and he was like a crippled old man."
