= Mike Hinnant =

American football player (born 1966)

No. 48, 65, 67, 81, 86
- Position: Tight end

Personal information
- Born: September 8, 1966 (age 60); Washington, D.C., U.S.
- Listed height: 6 ft 3 in (1.91 m)
- Listed weight: 268 lb (122 kg)

Career information
- High school: Spingarn (Washington D.C.)
- College: Temple
- NFL draft: 1988: 8th round, 211th overall pick

Career history
- Pittsburgh Steelers (1988–1989); Indianapolis Colts (1989); Atlanta Falcons (1990)*; Barcelona Dragons (1991–1992); Detroit Lions (1992)
- * Offseason or practice squad member only

Awards and highlights
- 2× First-team All-East (1986, 1987)

Career NFL statistics
- Receptions: 4
- Receiving yards: 51
- Return yards: 13
- Stats at Pro Football Reference

Michael Wesley Hinnant (born September 8, 1966) is an American former professional football player who was a tight end in the National Football League (NFL) and the World League of American Football (WLAF). He was selected by the Steelers in the eighth round of the 1988 NFL draft. He played for the Pittsburgh Steelers and Detroit Lions of the NFL, and the Barcelona Dragons of the WLAF. Hinnant played collegiately at Temple University.
