= Murray State Racers football =

Football team that represents Murray State University

2026 Murray State Racers football team
- First season: 1924; 102 years ago
- Athletic director: Nico Yankto
- Head coach: Jody Wright; 2nd season, 2–22 (.083)
- Location: Murray, Kentucky
- Stadium: Roy Stewart Stadium (capacity: 16,800)
- NCAA division: Division I FCS
- Conference: Missouri Valley
- Colors: Navy blue and gold
- All-time record: 502–495–36 (.503)
- Bowl record: 0–1 (.000)

Conference championships
- MVC: 1928 OVC: 1948, 1950, 1951, 1979, 1986, 1995, 1996, 2002
- Rivalries: Western Kentucky (Rivalry) Austin Peay (Rivalry)
- Fight song: Fight Song and The Old Grey Mare
- Mascot: Racer One (live); Dunker (costume)
- Marching band: Racer Band
- Website: GoRacers.com

The Murray State Racers football team represents Murray State University in the sport of American football. The Racers compete in the Football Championship Subdivision (FCS) of the National Collegiate Athletic Association (NCAA) Division I and the Missouri Valley Football Conference (MVFC).

Murray State left the OVC in July 2022 to join the non-football Missouri Valley Conference, but remained in OVC football for the 2022 season before joining the MVFC in 2023.

== History ==
=== Stewart–Moore era (1932–1947) ===
The 1933 and 1937 teams won Southern Intercollegiate Athletic Association championships.

=== Johnson era (1997–1999) ===
Denver Johnson was hired as head coach of the Racers prior to the 1997 season. Johnson had previously served as an offensive line coach for the Oklahoma Sooners during the 1996 season. Due to a late hiring process and the loss of several key Murray State players from the previous season, the Racers were not expected to perform well under Johnson's first year as head coach. The Racers exceeded expectations by achieving a record of 7–4 and 5–2 in OVC play in Johnson's first season. The four losses included a hard-fought two-point overtime loss at Western Kentucky in the Battle for the Red Belt rivalry game.

In 1998, the Racers went 7–4 overall and 5–2 in Ohio Valley Conference play, including a win over the rival Western Kentucky Hilltoppers in the Battle for the Red Belt and a victory over the Southern Illinois Salukis. The only home loss of the season was a 44–46 loss to Tennessee State on November 14 in the final game of conference play. The Racers would have won the 1999 OVC championship had it not been for the loss. At the conclusion of the game, Tennessee State tore down Murray State's home field goalposts at Roy Stewart Stadium and took the goalposts back to Tennessee State.

The 1999 season ended in a similar fashion as Tennessee State once again deprived the Racers of a conference championship by narrowly defeating the Racers in the final game of conference play in the 1999 season. The Racers fell to Tennessee State on the road in Nashville by a score of 41–42. Murray State finished the 1999 season with an overall record of 7–4 and an OVC record of 5–2 once again. The Racers were undefeated at home in the 1999 season. After three seasons at Murray State, Johnson was hired in January 2000 as the new head coach of the Illinois State Redbirds. In his three years at Murray State, Denver Johnson's overall record as head coach was 21–12. Johnson's .636 winning percentage is fifth best all time among Murray State head football coaches.

After Johnson began coaching at Illinois State, Johnson alleged that a former assistant under him at Murray State gave a copy of his playbook from Murray State to Northern Illinois University prior to a game between Northern Illinois and Illinois State on September 9, 2000. The game, a 52–0 loss, was the worst defeat for Illinois State in 40 years. Johnson alleged that the assistant was angry he was not asked to come to Illinois State when Johnson left Murray State. Northern Illinois coach Joe Novak denied having the Murray State playbook.

=== Pannunzio era (2000–2005) ===
In November 2002, the Racers won a share of the Ohio Valley Conference championship with a 37–35 win over an Eastern Illinois University squad led by future NFL quarterback Tony Romo. Murray State kicker Shane Andrus kicked the 52-yard game-winning field goal as time expired. Murray State finished the season 7–4–0 and 5–1–0 in conference, and the Racers received the OVC's automatic bid to the Division I-AA playoffs. In the first round of the NCAA Division I playoffs, the Racers faced off against the archrival Western Kentucky Hilltoppers on the road in Bowling Green, Kentucky. The Hilltoppers won the rivalry game 59-20 and went on to win the Division I-AA national championship.

In January 2003, former Florida State Seminoles quarterback Adrian McPherson announced that he had transferred to Murray State. As a sophomore at Florida State, McPherson started four games and appeared in nine games total, completing 80-of-155 passes for 1,017 yards with 12 TD passes and only one interception. McPherson had been removed from the Florida State team in November 2002 after being arrested and charged with stealing and forging a signature on a blank check. McPherson began attending classes at Murray State and planned to play football for the Racers. He was initially not expected to lose any college eligibility by transferring from Florida State to Murray State. As the ongoing investigation began to bring additional charges against McPherson, Murray State informed him that he would not allow him to play until his legal problems were resolved. McPherson dropped out of Murray State in early February 2003, less than a month after he transferred to the school. Murray State Athletic Director E.W. Dennison commented, "I think he realized his football career would be put on hold indefinitely. He's been at home for two weeks attending to legal matters, which has kept him away from classes and put him behind academically."

On April 29, 2005, Murray State coach Joe Pannunzio was placed on paid administrative leave following the arrest of a Murray State football player and a former player on drug trafficking and weapons charges. Ron Lane, a junior running back, and Terrence Biggers, a former wide receiver, were charged with trafficking in a controlled substance within 1,000 yards of a school and possession of drug paraphernalia. Following the incident, Athletic Director Allen Ward stated, "charges of this severity and magnitude demand stepped-up review of our football program." Ron Lane was removed from the team and both students were banned from campus.

Murray State finished the 2005 season with a winless conference record of 0–7–0 and an overall record of 2–9–0. In November 2005, Joe Pannunzio was notified that his contract would not be renewed. According to an interview several years later with former Murray State president F. King Alexander, Alexander explained Pannunzio's departure by stating, "I fired our football coach, Joe Pannunzio, because of numerous incidents that occurred in our program under him that were quite bad." Murray State's overall record under Pannunzio was 30–37–0 (.448), which left him as one of five Racer football coaches with overall losing records.

=== Griffin era (2006–2009) ===
Matt Griffin was named head coach of the Racers on December 12, 2005. Shortly after he was announced as the new head coach at Murray State, Griffin was honored by the Tennessee Sports Writers Association as Tennessee's College Football Coach of the Year after making considerable improvement as head coach of the University of Tennessee at Martin. The Skyhawks had not won a conference game in six years prior to Griffin's arrival. Under Griffin, the Skyhawks improved to 4–4 in OVC play and a 6–5 overall record by his third season in 2005. This was the first winning season for the Skyhawks since 1993.

Murray State hoped for similar improvement under Griffin, but instead the football program reached a low point under his leadership as head coach of the Racers. Griffin brought his entire coaching staff from UT-Martin to join him at Murray State. Griffin was faced with many challenges inherited from the previous Murray State coaching staff, including few returning players and APR penalties imposed by the NCAA. In Griffin's first season, the Racers went 1–10–0 overall and 0–8–0 in OVC play. In 2007, the Racers minimally improved to 2–9–0 overall and 1–7–0 in conference play. Griffin's third season was his best, leading the Racers to a 5–7–0 overall record and a 4–4–0 record in conference. In Griffin's fourth season, the Racers slipped back to 3–8–0 overall and 2–6–0 in OVC play. While Griffin was able to make improvements to stabilize and rebuild the program and restore academic integrity, he was ultimately unable to stop the decline that had started under previous coach Joe Pannunzio. Following four straight losing seasons and an overall record of 11–34–0, the lowest winning percentage in Murray State history (.244), Matt Griffin was fired on November 16, 2009.

=== Hatcher era (2010–2014) ===
In December 2009 Chris Hatcher was introduced as the new head football coach at Murray State. Hatcher brought his spread offense, known as the 'Hatch Attack', to Murray State after a three-year run at Georgia Southern. In his first year as head coach, Hatcher led the Racers to their first winning season in seven years by going 6–5 in 2010. A highlight of the season was the October 9, 2010 Homecoming game in which Murray State beat the Missouri State Bears by a score of 72–59. The show of offense led by quarterback Casey Brockman set the modern-day scoring record for the Racers, surpassing the previous modern-day record of 71 set against Iowa Wesleyan on Homecoming in 1967. Brockman went 32-for-41 in the game for a school record 570 yards and seven touchdowns. Brockman also rushed for 16 yards and an additional touchdown. With a victory over Tennessee State in the final game of the 2010 season, Chris Hatcher earned his 100th career win. Hatcher became the fifth youngest coach in college football history, youngest in the 21st century, to reach 100 coaching victories.

During the 2011 season, Murray State quarterback Casey Brockman made NCAA history by throwing for an FCS-record 422 yards in the first half of the game against Tennessee State. He went on to throw for 600 yards and seven touchdowns, becoming the fifth player in FCS history to throw for 600 yards in a game. On September 17, 2011, Murray State defeated Tennessee State 58–27 at home in front of 10,031 fans. The game against Tennessee State marked the largest crowd at a home game since 2000 and the largest crowd for a home opener since 1996. Following the 2011 season, Murray State quarterback Casey Brockman was selected as a Third-Team AP All-American, becoming the first Racer quarterback in history to earn All-America honors. Murray State finished the 2011 season with a 7–4 record, marking the first time the Racers posted back-to-back winning seasons since 1999–2000. As a result of the success, head coach Chris Hatcher was rewarded with a two-year contract extension in January 2012.

Prior to the start of the 2012 season, Murray State quarterback Casey Brockman was named to the Walter Payton Award Watch List, and he was named OVC Preseason Player of the Year for the second straight season. Roy Stewart Stadium also received minor upgrades prior to the 2012 season, including new press box windows and a new public address system. In the 52–14 win over Austin Peay in October 2012, Casey Brockman broke former Racer Michael Proctor's record for the most touchdown passes in school history with his 52nd career touchdown pass. In the same game, Brockman also passed former Eastern Illinois quarterback Tony Romo for third on OVC all-time passing list. In Chris Harcher's third season, the Racers finished 5–6 overall and 4–4 in OVC play. Casey Brockman and Walter Powell earned OVC all-conference first team honors. Brockman closed out his college career by going 359-for-517 for 3,729 yards and 28 touchdowns, as well as rushing for seven touchdowns, during the 2012 season. He finished sixth in voting for the 2012 Walter Payton Award. Walter Powell had the best season in school history for a receiver. Powell set new school records with 94 catches for 1,213 yards, and he became only the fourth Racer to catch 10 touchdown passes in a season.

Just prior to the start of the 2013 season, sophomore quarterback Maikhail Miller transferred to Murray State from the University of Mississippi, and he earned the starting QB position. Miller led the Racers to a 35-34 OT win over the Jacksonville State Gamecocks in the fifth game of the season. The victory was Murray State's first win over Jacksonville State since the Gamecocks joined the OVC in 2003.

Hatcher left after the 2014 season to coach the Samford Bulldogs.

=== Stewart era (2015–2019) ===
in December 2009 Mitch Stewart was promoted from offensive coordinator and quarterbacks coach to the 18th head football in Murray State Football history. Prior to Murray State, Stewart served once again under Chris Hatcher as the receivers coach at Georgia Southern. During his first season in 2015 Stewart was the youngest head coach in Division 1 football. His tenure however got off to a rough start ending the season 7th in conference and with an overall record of 3–8.

During his second season in 2016, coach Stewart's team showed little improvement, winning one more game. The team finished 4–7 overall and 6th in the OVC. In the off-season, former star quarterback Casey Brockman was promoted to offensive coordinator.

His third season in 2017 proved to be no better, finishing 3–8 overall and once again 6th in conference. The Racers seemed to still be going through growing pains. Mitch Stewart in the Racers would start to turn things around in the next season.

In His fourth season in 2018 the Racers showed much improvement. The Racers got off to a rough start after facing two top ten FCS teams and the University of Kentucky but picked up in conference play. The Racers started off conference play winning the first four games in conference play. The Racers ended up finishing 5–6 overall and 5–3 in conference, ending the season 4th in the OVC. This was Stewart's best finish during his tenure with the Racers.

In Stewart's final season with the Racers in 2019 the Racers backtracked from the previous year. The Racers showed promise against the University of Georgia and seemed to be ready for conference play but that turned out to be an illusion. The Racers finished 4–8 overall and finished 2–6 in conference play landing in the 8th spot in the OVC. Stewart was removed from his position as head coach following the conclusion of the season.

=== Hood era (2020–2023) ===
In December 2019, Dean Hood was hired to be the 19th head coach at Murray State University. Prior to his hiring, Hood was the special teams coordinator and defensive backs coach at Kentucky. Hood had prior head coaching experience at Eastern Kentucky. During his tenure there, he had a head coaching record of 55–38 with three playoff appearances in 2008, 2011, and 2014 and a pair of OVC championships in 2008 and 2011.

Due to the COVID-19 pandemic, the Racers did not hold a fall season in 2020, as did the rest of the OVC. Instead, they played a 7-game conference-only spring season in early 2021. This is the first time this had happened in program history, so they faced a lot of adversity. However, Hood lead the Racers to one of the best turnarounds in the nation in his very first season, ending their season with a 5–2 record and narrowly missing out on an OVC championship.

=== Wright era (since 2024) ===
Murray State introduced Jody Wright as its 20th head football coach on January 10, 2024.

== Championships ==
=== Conference championships ===
The Murray State has won eight Ohio Valley Conference (OVC) championships and ranks fourth in total conference championships among OVC teams.

Season	Conference	Overall record	Conference record
1928	Mississippi Valley Conference	9–0–1	
1948†	Ohio Valley Conference	9–1	3–1
1950	Ohio Valley Conference	7–2–1	5–0–1
1951	Ohio Valley Conference	8–1	5–1
1979	Ohio Valley Conference	9–2–1	6–0
1986†	Ohio Valley Conference	7–4–1	6–1
1995	Ohio Valley Conference	11–1	8–0
1996	Ohio Valley Conference	11–2	8–0
2002†	Ohio Valley Conference	7–5	5–1

† Co-champions

== NCAA Division I-AA/FCS playoff results ==
The Racers have appeared in the I-AA/FCS playoffs five times with a record of 1–5.

Year	Round	Opponent	Result
1979	Semi-finals	Lehigh	L 9–28
1986	First round	Eastern Illinois	L 21–28
1995	First round	Northern Iowa	L 34–35
1996	First round Quarterfinals	Western Illinois; Troy State	W 34–6; L 3–31
2002	First round	Western Kentucky	L 20–59

== Future coaching success ==
The Murray State football program has become a steppingstone to major-college coaching success. Six former Murray State coaches have gone on to head coaching positions at BCS schools.

- Mike Gottfried served as head coach of the Racers from 1978 to 1980. He was recognized as OVC Coach of the Year in 1979. Gottfried went on to coach the Cincinnati Bearcats, Kansas Jayhawks, and Pittsburgh Panthers.
- Ron Zook served as a secondary coach at Murray State under Gottfried from 1978 to 1980. Zook went on to become the head coach of the Florida Gators from 2002 to 2004, and the Illinois head coach from 2005 to 2011.
- Frank Beamer served as head coach of the Racers from 1981 to 1986. After leaving Murray State, Beamer went on to build the Virginia Tech program into a national power through the 1990s and early 2000s.
- Ralph Friedgen was an assistant coach at Murray State under Frank Beamer in 1981. Friedgen was the head coach of Maryland from 2001 to 2010.
- Mike O'Cain was an assistant coach at Murray State under Frank Beamer from 1981 to 1984. O'Cain was the head coach of NC State from 1993 to 1999.
- Houston Nutt was head coach of the Racers from 1993 to 1996. He was recognized as the Eddie Robinson National Coach of the Year in 1996 and the OVC Coach of the Year in 1995 and 1996 while coaching the Racers. Nutt went on to coach the Arkansas Razorbacks to three SEC division titles, and served as the head coach of Ole Miss from 2008 to 2011. In his first two years at Ole Miss, Nutt coached the Rebels to back-to-back Cotton Bowl Classic victories.

In addition to the success of former Racer football coaches, former players have also gone on to achieve major coaching successes.

- Bud Foster has served as the defensive coordinator for the Virginia Tech Hokies since 1995. Following the 2006 season, he received the Frank Broyles Award, which is given annually to the top assistant coach in college football. Foster played strong safety and outside linebacker at Murray State between 1977 and 1980. He began his coaching career as a graduate assistant under Frank Beamer at Murray State in 1981. Foster went on to Virginia Tech with Frank Beamer in 1987 where he held several coaching roles before taking on the role of defensive coordinator in 1995.
- Justin Fuente was named head football coach of the Memphis Tigers in 2011, and head football coach of Virginia Tech in 2016. As a player, Fuente was named Ohio Valley Conference Player of the Year in 1999. As a senior in 1999, Fuente set school season records for passing yards (3,498), attempts (400), completions (240) and touchdowns (27). Fuente still holds the MSU record for most 300-yard passing games with ten.

== Rivalries ==
=== Austin Peay ===
Murray State has had an interstate rivalry with Austin Peay, whose campus is about 65 miles east of Murray in Clarksville, Tennessee. Austin Peay left the OVC in July 2022 for the ASUN Conference, which began FCS play in the 2022 season. Murray State leads the series 36–20, which began in 1953 and was most recently annually played since 2007, but Austin Peay has won the last six meetings. Murray State and Austin Peay agreed to a 12-game, home-and-home football series that concludes in 2037.

=== Eastern Kentucky ===
Murray State had an in-state rivalry with Eastern Kentucky before that school left the OVC after the 2020–21 season for the ASUN Conference (playing the 2021 football season in an alliance between that league and the Western Athletic Conference). As of the last meeting between the two teams in 2019, Eastern Kentucky leads the series 47–28–4. The series began in 1929 and had been annually played since 1945.

=== Southeast Missouri ===
Murray State has an interstate rivalry with Southeast Missouri, whose campus is about 90 miles northwest of Murray in Cape Girardeau, Missouri. Murray State leads the series 43–14–1. The series began in 1926 and has most recently been annually played since 1991.

=== UT Martin ===
Another OVC interstate rivalry is against UT Martin, whose campus is about 50 miles southwest of Murray State. The Racers lead the series 38–23–1. The series began in 1924 and most recently met in 2022.

=== Western Kentucky ===
In 1922, the Murray State Normal School was chartered as a state-supported teacher training institution, because the Western Kentucky State Normal School and Eastern Kentucky State Normal School could no longer produce a sufficient number of teachers to support the growing demand in the state. Located only 120 miles away from one another, and both in the western portion of the state, Murray State and Western Kentucky quickly became known as sister institutions as well as fierce competitors. In 1941, prior to a SIAA championship game between the Racers and Hilltoppers, Murray State President James H. Richmond remarked, "We are always happy when we can defeat our chief rival and greatest friend."

The football rivalry with Western Kentucky began with a Hilltopper victory on October 24, 1931. In 1939, both institutions strengthened the rivalry by scheduling the match up as the final game of their regular seasons. This tradition continued, with only four interruptions, for the next 46 years. In 1948 both schools joined to form the Ohio Valley Conference, where Murray won the first championship in football.

The football rivalry was cemented as an annual trophy game in 1978 known as the Battle for the Red Belt. The Red Belt originated in 1978 when WKU athletic trainer Bill Edwards attended a district trainers' meeting in Atlanta with Murray State trainer Tom Simmons. Simmons forgot to bring a belt, and borrowed a red one from Edwards. After the meeting, Edwards asked for the return of his belt, but Simmons responded that WKU would have to battle Murray State in football to get it back. Simmons had the belt mounted on a large plaque with brass plates to record the annual game scores of the annual rivalry game. The annual meetings between the two teams ended in 2000, but the Battle for the Red Belt is still played on in intermittent basis. The last game was played in 2008 when a record crowd of 22,297 in Bowling Green watched the Hilltoppers, in their second year as Football Bowl Subdivision members, beat the Racers 50–9 and maintain possession of the Red Belt. The Racers and Hilltoppers have met 67 times in football, with Western Kentucky leading the series 36–24–7.

== Individual honors ==
=== Retired numbers ===
Murray State Racers retired numbers
No.	Player	Pos.	Tenure	Ref.
10	Larry Tillman	1966–1969	1969	
11	Michael Proctor	1986–1989	1993	

=== AP All-Americans ===
Player	Position	Year(s) selected
Elmer Cochran	G	1937
Al Giordano	G/LB	1955, 1956
Gary Foltz	End	1962
Don Clayton	RB	1973
Eddie McFarland	DB	1977
Terry Love	DB	1979
Charlie Wiles	G	1986
Anthony Hutch	RB	1993
Derrick Cullors	RB	1995
Anthony Hutch	DL	1995
William Hampton	DB	1995, 1996
Rob Hart	K	1996
Reggie Swinton	WR	1996
Ronnie Merritt	LB	1997
Marcus Stepp	DL	1998
Brian Bivens	P	1999 (Second-Team)
Shane Andrus	K	2001 (First-Team)
Nathan Williams	LB	2008 (First-Team)
Austen Lane	DE	2008 (Third-Team), 2009 (First-Team)
Marcus Harris	WR	2010 (Second-Team)
Casey Brockman	QB	2011 (Third-Team), 2012 (Second-Team)
Walt Powell	WR	2011 (First-Team)

== Future non-conference opponents ==
Future non-conference opponents announced as of July 20, 2026

2026	2027	2028	2029	2030	2031	2032	2033	2034	2035	2036	2037
Eastern Illinois	at Eastern Illinois	Faulkner	Western Illinois	at Cincinnati	Austin Peay	at Austin Peay	Austin Peay	at Austin Peay	Austin Peay	at Austin Peay	Austin Peay
at Middle Tennessee	Presbyterian	East Tennessee State	Austin Peay	at Austin Peay	at Western Illinois						
Valparaiso	Austin Peay	at Austin Peay	at Lindenwood	Lindenwood							
at Oklahoma State	at Kentucky	at Louisville									
