= Rich Bartlewski =

American football player (born 1967)

No. 46, 87, 88
- Position: Tight end

Personal information
- Born: August 15, 1967 (age 59); Butler, Pennsylvania, U.S.
- Listed height: 6 ft 5 in (1.96 m)
- Listed weight: 250 lb (113 kg)

Career information
- High school: Chowchilla (Chowchilla, California)
- College: Fresno State
- NFL draft: 1990: undrafted

Career history
- Los Angeles Raiders (1990); Atlanta Falcons (1991); Montreal Machine (1992); Dallas Cowboys (1992)*
- * Offseason or practice squad member only

Awards and highlights
- First-team All-Big West (1989)
- Stats at Pro Football Reference

Richard Stanley Bartlewski Jr. (born August 15, 1967) is an American former professional football player who was a tight end in the National Football League (NFL) and the World League of American Football (WLAF). He played for the Los Angeles Raiders and Atlanta Falcons of the NFL, and the Montreal Machine of the WLAF. Bartlewski played college football for the Fresno State Bulldogs.
