= Quintin Jones (American football) =

American football player (born 1966)

No. 27, 31, 19, 25
- Position: Safety

Personal information
- Born: July 28, 1966 (age 60); Miami, Florida, U.S.
- Listed height: 5 ft 11 in (1.80 m)
- Listed weight: 193 lb (88 kg)

Career information
- High school: Pompano Beach (FL)
- College: Pittsburgh
- NFL draft: 1988: 2nd round, 48th overall pick

Career history
- Houston Oilers (1988), (1990); Montreal Machine (1991–1992); Sacramento Gold Miners (1993)*
- * Offseason or practice squad member only

Awards and highlights
- Second-team All-East (1987)

Career NFL statistics
- Games played: 5
- Stats at Pro Football Reference

Quintin Maurice Jones (born July 28, 1966) is an American former professional football player who was a safety in the National Football League (NFL) for the Houston Oilers. He also was member of the Montreal Machine in the World League of American Football (WLAF). He played college football for the Pittsburgh Panthers.

== Early life ==
Jones attended Ely High School, where he was a cornerback. He accepted a football scholarship from the University of Pittsburgh. As a freshman, he was named the starter at left cornerback and tied for second on the club with 2 interceptions.

As a sophomore, he was a part of a Panther's defensive secondary that was called "The Burnt Toast Patrol", after giving up a school record 2,283 passing yards.

As a junior, he tied with Billy Owens for the team lead with 4 interceptions. He finished his college career with 8 interceptions.

== Professional career ==
Jones was selected by the Houston Oilers in the second round (48th overall) of the 1988 NFL draft, to play safety. After a lengthy contract holdout, he was signed on October 4.

He was waived on September 4, 1989. In April 1990, he was signed as a free agent by the Oilers to play cornerback. He was released on September 12.

On February 24, 1991, he was selected by the Montreal Machine of the World League of American Football. He was named the starting strong safety. In 1992, he began the season with the team, before being released on April 30.

On April 15, 1993, he was signed by the Sacramento Gold Miners of the Canadian Football League. He was released before the start of the season.
