= Adam Bob =

American football player (1967–2019)

No. 52, 94
- Position: Linebacker

Personal information
- Born: October 30, 1967; Milwaukee, Wisconsin, U.S.
- Died: July 16, 2019 (aged 51); Texas
- Listed height: 6 ft 2 in (1.88 m)
- Listed weight: 240 lb (109 kg)

Career information
- High school: Northside (Lafayette, Louisiana)
- College: Texas A&M
- NFL draft: 1989: 10th round, 265th overall pick

Career history
- New York Jets (1989); Tampa Bay Buccaneers (1990)*; Montreal Machine (1991-1992)
- * Offseason or practice squad member only

Career NFL statistics
- Games played: 5
- Stats at Pro Football Reference

Adam Bob Jr. (October 30, 1967 – July 16, 2019) was an American professional football player who played as a linebacker in the National Football League (NFL). He was selected by the New York Jets in the tenth round of the 1989 NFL draft and played that season with the team.
