= Montreal Machine =

World League of American Football team

Logo

General information
- Founded: 1991
- Folded: 1992
- Stadium: Olympic Stadium
- Headquartered: Montreal, Quebec, Canada
- Colors: Maroon, silver, navy, red, white

League / conference affiliations
- World League of American Football

The Montreal Machine were the sole Canadian (and non-U.S.-based North American) team in the World League of American Football (WLAF), a springtime developmental professional league set up by the National Football League (NFL), that played in 1991 and 1992. There were also three European teams and six U.S.–based teams. Like all WLAF teams, the Machine played American rules football, 11 players per side on a 100-yard-long/53 1/3-yard-wide field, rather than Canadian rules football of 12 players per side on a 110-yard-long/65-yard-wide field.

The Machine filled a void created by the folding of the Canadian Football League's Montreal Alouettes in 1987. It was the first American football team in Canada since the Montreal Beavers, Toronto Rifles and Victoria Steelers, which all played in the Continental Football League in 1967. The NFL had also played two international preseason games in Montreal in 1988 and 1990 during the Alouettes' absence.

Though the Machine struggled on the field with a combined record of 6–14 in their two seasons, they were in contention for the North American East Division title (and its guaranteed playoff berth) in 1991 until the final week of the regular season, when they were mathematically eliminated following the New York/New Jersey Knights' season-ending win over San Antonio on May 25. Wins over the eventual World Bowl finalists the Orlando Thunder and the expansion Ohio Glory helped the Machine to second place in the division at the halfway point of the 1992 season, but they would go winless in the second half of the season.

After two years, the Machine, and the entire WLAF, were put on "hiatus" by the NFL. In 1995, the three European-based franchises (and three more) were reconstituted as the World League (later known as NFL Europe); the North American teams were folded, thus becoming a purely European league. The Machine played their home games at Olympic Stadium in Montreal, which also hosted what would be the WLAF's last game in its original incarnation, World Bowl '92. A crowd of 43,789 watched the Sacramento Surge defeat the Orlando Thunder, 21–17.

The Machine's average game attendance was 31,888 in their first year of play, well above the league average and above expectations. It dropped to 25,254 in their second (and final) year, still in line with league average, though home attendance gradually dropped at every game in the 1992 season.

The end of the WLAF's North American operations was soon followed by the CFL commencing its own U.S. expansion experiment, which lasted for three seasons. The subsequent demise of the CFL's U.S. teams coincided with pro football's return to Montreal in 1996 when the third and current incarnation of the Montreal Alouettes commenced play. The Alouettes had been revived by the owners of the Baltimore Stallions, the most successful of the CFL's American franchises, who upon shuttering their U.S.-based team relocated their football organization to Montreal.

== Season-by-season ==
Season	League	Regular season					Postseason			
Season	League	Won	Lost	Ties	Win %	Finish	Won	Lost	Win %	Result
1991	WLAF	4	6	0	.400	3rd (North American East)	–	–	—	—
1992	WLAF	2	8	0	.200	3rd (North American East)	–	–	—	—
Total		6	14	0	.300		–	–	—	

== 1991 season ==
1991 Montreal Machine season
- Owner: Roger Dore
- General manager: Gordon Cahill
- Head coach: Jacques Dussault
- Home stadium: Olympic Stadium

Results
- Record: 4–6
- Division place: 3rd (North American)
- Playoffs: did not qualify

== Staff ==
1991 Montreal Machine staff
Front office: Owner/President – Roger Dore; General Manager – Gordon Cahill; Director of Player Personnel – Lionel Vital; Head coaches: Head Coach – Jacques Dussault; Offensive coaches: Offensive Coordinator/Quarterbacks – Joe Faragalli; Running Backs/Tight Ends – Paul Pawlak; Receivers – Joseph Tricario; Offensive Line – John Salavantis	Defensive coaches: Defensive Coordinator/Defensive Backs – Don Sutherin; Defensive Line/Linebackers – Hank Hughes

== Roster ==
1991 Montreal Machine final roster
Quarterbacks: 16 Ben Brown; 8 Dave Dacus; 1 Chris Flynn; 14 Michael Proctor; 7 Kevin Sweeney; Running backs: 21 Darryl Harris; 34 Ricky Johnson; 47 Broderick Sargent; Wide receivers: 81 Mike Cadore; 83 Gary Cooper; 82 Wyatt Harris; 84 Willie Snead; 82 Steve Williams; Tight ends: 86 K. D. Dunn; 80 Steve Fumi	Offensive linemen: 71 Tony Brown G/T; 73 Dave DesRochers T; 63 Pat Doyle G; 50 Dan Graham C; 62 Mike Kelley G/C; 64 Bob Kula G; 67 Keven Lightner G; 79 Jeff Novak T; Defensive linemen: 70 Johnny Carter NT; 72 O'Neill Gilbert DE; 91 Jerry Leggett DE; 92 George Little DE; 76 Rollin Putzier DE; 90 Desmond Royal NT	Linebackers: 94 Adam Bob ILB; 26 Tyrone Jones OLB; 57 Dan Murray ILB; 55 Ray Savage OLB; 53 Tracy Simien OLB; 59 Henry Walls ILB; Defensive backs: 22 Teryl Austin CB; 30 Hency Charles FS; 31 Jamie Gray SS; 20 Darryl Holmes FS; 36 Orsorio Jackson CB; 25 Quintin Jones SS; 45 Steve Lofton CB; 42 Richard Shelton CB; Special teams: 4 Steve Kasowski K; 11 Chris Mohr P; 3 Björn Nittmo K	Operation Discovery: Vacant; Rookies in italics

=== Results ===
Week	Date	Opponent	Result	Record	Venue	Attendance	Source
1	March 23	at Birmingham Fire	W 20–5	1–0	Legion Field	52,942	
2	April 1	Barcelona Dragons	L 10–34	1–1	Olympic Stadium	53,238	
3	April 8	Birmingham Fire	W 23–10	2–1	Olympic Stadium	27,766	
4	April 13	New York/New Jersey Knights	L 0–44	2–2	Olympic Stadium	34,821	
5	April 20	at London Monarchs	L 7–45	2–3	Wembley Stadium	35,294	
6	April 27	at Frankfurt Galaxy	L 7–17	2–4	Waldstadion	25,269	
7	May 4	at Sacramento Surge	W 26–23 ^{OT}	3–4	Hughes Stadium	17,326	
8	May 13	Raleigh–Durham Skyhawks	W 15–6	4–4	Olympic Stadium	20,123	
9	May 19	at San Antonio Riders	L 10–27	4–5	Alamo Stadium	20,234	
10	May 27	Orlando Thunder	L 27–33 ^{OT}	4–6	Olympic Stadium	23,493	

== 1992 season ==
1992 Montreal Machine season
- Home stadium: Olympic Stadium

Results
- Record: 2–8
- Division place: 3rd (North American)
- Playoffs: did not qualify

== Roster ==
1992 Montreal Machine final roster
Quarterbacks: 16 Ben Brown; 8 Anthony Dilweg; 10 Craig Kupp; 14 Michael Proctor; Running backs: 33 Aaron Emanuel; 21 Darryl Harris; 34 Ricky Johnson; 35 Sean Russell; 32 Charlie Young; Wide receivers: 85 Andre Brown; 80 Reggie Bynum; 1 Chris Flynn; 89 Pete Mandley; 82 Steve Williams; Tight ends: 88 Rich Bartlewski; 86 K. D. Dunn	Offensive linemen: 71 Tom Backes G/C; 63 Jay Butler T; 62 Gene Cullinane C; 73 Dave DesRochers T; 64 Bob Kula C; 75 Roman Matusz T; 77 Matt McCall G; 79 Jeff Novak G; Defensive linemen: 93 Mike Finn NT; 66 Emanuel King DE; 92 George Little DE; 76 Rollin Putzier DE; 90 Desmond Royal NT	Linebackers: 94 Adam Bob ILB; 53 Reggie Clark OLB; 56 Darrell Davis OLB; 50 Kevin McArthur ILB; 54 Reggie McKenzie ILB; 55 Ray Savage OLB; Defensive backs: 31 Jamie Gray SS; 20 Darryl Holmes FS; 25 Quintin Jones SS; 23 James Lott CB; 29 Kris McCall CB; 22 Tony Newsom CB; 42 Billy Owens FS; 26 Elliot Smith CB/SS; 24 Dee Thomas CB; 30 Shawn Wilbourn FS; Special teams: 12 Greg Horne P; 3 Björn Nittmo K; 4 Monte Robbins P	Operation Discovery: Vacant; Rookies in italics

=== Results ===
Week	Date	Opponent	Result	Record	Venue	Attendance	Source
1	March 22	at San Antonio Riders	L 16–17	0–1	Bobcat Stadium	10,698	
2	March 28	Orlando Thunder	W 31–29	1–1	Olympic Stadium	36,022	
3	April 4	at Sacramento Surge	L 7–14	1–2	Hornet Stadium	21,024	
4	April 12	Ohio Glory	W 31–20	2–2	Olympic Stadium	28,533	
5	April 19	at Orlando Thunder	L 8–16	2–3	Florida Citrus Bowl	8,310	
6	April 26	New York/New Jersey Knights	L 11–34	2–4	Olympic Stadium	25,890	
7	May 3	Sacramento Surge	L 21–35	2–5	Olympic Stadium	21,183	
8	May 10	at Birmingham Fire	L 16–23 OT	2–6	Legion Field	8,764	
9	May 17	London Monarchs	L 13–45	2–7	Olympic Stadium	14,637	
10	May 23	at New York/New Jersey Knights	L 21–41	2–8	Giants Stadium	18,277	
