= Billy Owens (American football) =

American football player (born 1965)

No. 31, 42
- Position: Safety

Personal information
- Born: December 2, 1965 (age 60); Syracuse, New York, U.S.
- Listed height: 6 ft 1 in (1.85 m)
- Listed weight: 207 lb (94 kg)

Career information
- High school: Christian Brothers Academy (DeWitt, New York)
- College: Pittsburgh
- NFL draft: 1988: 10th round, 263rd overall pick

Career history
- Dallas Cowboys (1988); Pittsburgh Steelers (1990)*; Orlando Thunder (1991); Montreal Machine (1992); Orlando Predators (1993–1994); Charlotte Rage (1995–1996); Connecticut Coyotes (1996); Portland Forest Dragons (1997)
- * Offseason or practice squad member only

Awards and highlights
- First-team All-East (1986); Second-team All-East (1987)

Career NFL statistics
- Sacks: 1
- Stats at Pro Football Reference
- Stats at ArenaFan.com

Billy Joe Owens Jr. (born December 2, 1965) is an American former professional football player who was a safety in the National Football League (NFL) for the Dallas Cowboys. He also played in the Arena Football League (AFL) for the Orlando Predators, Charlotte Rage, Connecticut Coyotes and Portland Forest Dragons. He played college football for the Pittsburgh Panthers.

== Early life ==
Owens attended Christian Brothers High School, where he played as a running back, wide receiver and safety. He received All-state honors as a senior. He also lettered in basketball, baseball and track.

He accepted a football scholarship from the University of Pittsburgh, where he was switched between running back to safety as a freshman, but still managed to average 8.3 yards per carry (14 carries for 116 yards and one touchdown). In 1984, he was redshirted after being lost for the season with a knee injury.

As a sophomore, he became the starter at free safety toward the end of the season, although he was used as a backup running back in some games. He was a part of a secondary that was called "The Burnt Toast Patrol", after giving up a school record 2,283 passing yards.

As a junior, he was moved to strong safety and was fourth on the team with 106 tackles. He also tied with Quintin Jones for the club lead with 4 interceptions. He had a career-high 16 tackles against North Carolina State University.

As a senior, he tallied 88 tackles (fifth on the team), 2 sacks, 2 fumble recoveries and one interception. He also averaged 22.4 yards as a part-time kick off returner. Against West Virginia University, he tallied 9 tackles, one sack and 2 forced fumbles, including the one that set up the winning field goal in Pittsburgh's 6-3 win. He made a season-high 10 tackles in the upset 30–22 win against the University of Notre Dame. He had a memorable play against Penn State University, when he returned an interception 69 yards to seal a 10-0 victory with 42 seconds remaining in the game. It was Pitt's first shutout over Penn State since 1955 (a 20-0 victory).

== Professional career ==
=== Dallas Cowboys ===
Owens was selected by the Dallas Cowboys in the tenth round (263rd overall) of the 1988 NFL draft. He made the team as a backup safety and played on passing downs as a linebacker. He posed 13 special teams tackles (fourth on the team), 7 defensive tackles, 2 passes defensed and one sack. He was waived on September 5, 1989.

=== Pittsburgh Steelers ===
On March 19, 1990, he was signed as a free agent by the Pittsburgh Steelers. He was released on September 3.

=== Orlando Thunder ===
In 1991, he signed with the Orlando Thunder of the World League of American Football. He registered 49 tackles (second on the team), 11 special teams tackles (led the team), one interception, 4 forced fumbles and one fumble recovery. He was released on March 10, 1992.

=== Montreal Machine ===
On May 5, 1992, he was claimed off waivers by the Montreal Machine of the World League of American Football.

=== Orlando Predators ===
In 1993, he signed with the Orlando Predators of the Arena Football League. He was declared inactive for the first four weeks. In 1994, he registered 46 receptions, 16 touchdowns, 47 tackles and 4 interceptions, however he asked for guarantees if the Predators did well in the playoffs, and the team reacted by suspending him before the semifinals game against the Massachusetts Marauders (a 51-42 win).

=== Charlotte Rage ===
On May 17, 1996, he was traded along with Reggie Robinson to the Connecticut Coyotes in exchange for Les Barley. He played in 3 games.

=== Portland Forest Dragons ===
In 1997, he signed with Portland Forest Dragons. He was released on March 21, 1998.

== Personal life ==
Owens grew up three blocks from the Syracuse University campus and was a ball boy for the Syracuse basketball team from 1977 to 1980.
