= Michael Proctor (gridiron football) =

American gridiron football player (1967–2026)

No. 14, 15
- Position: Quarterback

Personal information
- Born: July 14, 1967; Sylvester, Georgia, U.S.
- Died: February 11, 2026 (aged 58); Bourbonnais, Illinois, U.S.
- Listed height: 6 ft 4 in (1.93 m)
- Listed weight: 210 lb (95 kg)

Career information
- High school: Worth County (Sylvester)
- College: Murray State (1986–1989)
- NFL draft: 1990: undrafted

Career history
- New England Patriots (1990)*; Montreal Machine (1991); Cleveland Browns (1991)*; Montreal Machine (1992); Saskatchewan Roughriders (1993); Charlotte Rage (1994–1996)
- * Offseason or practice squad member only

Awards and highlights
- OVC Offensive Player of the Year (1989); 2× First-team All-OVC (1988–1989); Murray State Racers No. 11 retired

Career AFL statistics
- Passing comp. / att.: 279 / 486
- Completion percentage: 57.4%
- Passing yards: 3,492
- TD–INT: 51–12
- Rushing touchdowns: 12
- Stats at ArenaFan.com

Michael Proctor (July 14, 1967 – February 11, 2026), nicknamed "the General", was an American professional football player who was a quarterback in the Arena Football League (AFL), World League of American Football (WLAF), and Canadian Football League (CFL). He played college football for the Murray State Racers.

== Early life ==
Michael Proctor was born in Sylvester, Georgia, on July 14, 1967. He attended Worth County High School in Sylvester, Georgia.

== College career ==
Proctor was a four-year starter for the Murray State Racers of Murray State University from 1986 to 1989. He earned All-Ohio Valley Conference (OVC) honors in both 1988 and 1989. He was also the OVC Offensive Player of the Year in 1989. Proctor passed for a school record 8,632 yards. He also set Murray State and OVC records in career yards with 9,886. He majored in safety engineering and health at Murray State, and graduated in 1990. He was inducted into the Murray State University Athletic Hall of Fame in 2000 and his number 11 has been retired by the football program. Proctor was nicknamed "The General" while at Murray State.

== Professional career ==
Proctor signed with the New England Patriots in May 1990 after going undrafted in the 1990 NFL draft. He was released on August 26, 1990.

He was the starter for the Montreal Machine of the World League of American Football from 1991 to 1992. He completed 107 of 224 passes (47.8%) for 1,222 yards, three touchdowns, and ten interceptions in 1991 while also rushing 41 times for 247 yards and two touchdowns and fumbling 15 times. The Machine finished the season with a 4–6 record. Proctor signed with the Cleveland Browns of the NFL in early June 1991. On August 14, 1991, it was reported that he had been cut by the Browns. He returned to the Machine in 1992, recording 113 completions on 193 passing attempts (58.5%) for 1,478 yards, eight touchdowns, and five interceptions, and 38 carries for 207 yards and four touchdowns.

Proctor was signed by the Saskatchewan Roughriders of the Canadian Football League in April 1993. He dressed in three games for the Roughriders during the 1993 season but did not record any statistics. He also spent part of the year on the practice roster.

He played in all 12 games for the Charlotte Rage of the Arena Football League in 1994, completing 76 of 130 passes (58.5%) for 1,089 yards, 17 touchdowns, and three interceptions while also rushing for two touchdowns. He split time with Tony Kimbrough that year as the Rage finished 5–7. Proctor appeared in eight games in 1995, totaling 131 completions on 221 passing attempts (59.3%) for 1,539 yards, 18 touchdowns, and seven interceptions, and three rushing touchdowns. He split time with Andy Kelly that season as the team went 5–7 for the second straight season. Proctor played in nine games during the 1996 season, completing 72 of 135 passes (53.3%) for 864 yards, 16 touchdowns, and two interceptions while also scoring three rushing touchdowns.

== Death ==
Proctor died on February 11, 2026, aged 58.
