= K. D. Dunn =

American football player (born 1963)

K.D. Dunn
No. 80, 85, 87, 86
- Position: Tight end

Personal information
- Born: April 28, 1963 (age 63); Fort Hood, Texas, U.S.
- Listed height: 6 ft 3 in (1.91 m)
- Listed weight: 235 lb (107 kg)

Career information
- College: Clemson
- NFL draft: 1985: 5th round, 116th overall pick

Career history
- St. Louis Cardinals (1985)*; Tampa Bay Buccaneers (1985–1986); Washington Redskins (1987); New York Jets (1988–1989); Cleveland Browns (1990)*; Montreal Machine (1991); Cleveland Browns (1991)*; Montreal Machine (1992)
- * Offseason or practice squad member only

Awards and highlights
- National champion (1981)

Career NFL statistics
- Receptions: 11
- Receiving yards: 163
- Stats at Pro Football Reference

Keldrick Arthur Dunn (born April 28, 1963) is an American former professional football player who was a tight end in the National Football League (NFL) for the St. Louis Cardinals, Tampa Bay Buccaneers, Washington Redskins, and New York Jets. He played college football for the Clemson Tigers and was selected in the fifth round of the 1985 NFL draft with the 116th overall pick. He is currently the head football coach at Redan High School in Lithonia, Georgia (DeKalb County School District).
