= John Talley (American football) =

American football player (born 1964)

No. 87
- Positions: Wide receiver, tight end

Personal information
- Born: December 19, 1964 (age 61); Cleveland, Ohio, U.S.
- Listed height: 6 ft 5 in (1.96 m)
- Listed weight: 245 lb (111 kg)

Career information
- High school: Shaw (East Cleveland, Ohio)
- College: West Virginia
- NFL draft: 1988: undrafted

Career history
- Phoenix Cardinals (1988)*; Cleveland Browns (1989)*; Miami Dolphins (1989); Philadelphia Eagles (1989)*; Cleveland Browns (1990–1991); Indianapolis Colts (1992)*
- * Offseason or practice squad member only

Awards and highlights
- Second-team All-East (1987)

Career NFL statistics
- Receptions: 3
- Receiving yards: 41
- Stats at Pro Football Reference

John Thomas Eugene Talley Jr. (born December 19, 1964) is an American former professional football player who was a wide receiver and tight end in the National Football League (NFL). He played college football for the West Virginia Mountaineers.

== College career ==
Talley spent four seasons as a member of the West Virginia Mountaineers and originally played quarterback. He started several games for the Mountaineers as a sophomore in 1985 and became the second African-American to start at quarterback in the school's history, completing 53 of 109 passes for 507 yards with four touchdowns and seven interceptions while also rushing for 181 yards and two touchdowns. He moved to wide receiver during his junior season. As a senior, Talley had 25 receptions for 307 yards and two touchdowns.

== Professional career ==
Talley was a member of the Philadelphia Eagles and the Miami Dolphins during the 1988 preseason, but did not make either team's active roster. He spent the 1989 season with the Cleveland Browns practice squad after being waived from the active roster at the end of the preseason. He played in 14 games as a wide receiver and tight end with two starts the following season, catching two passes for 28 yards. He played in three games during the 1991 season with one reception for 13 yards before he was placed on injured reserve in early November. Talley was waived by the Browns after the 1991 season.

== Personal life ==
Talley is the younger brother of College Football Hall of Famer and former All-Pro Linebacker Darryl Talley. Talley now resides in Brunswick, Ohio.
