= 1987 All-East football team =

American college football all-star team

The 1987 All-East football team consists of American football players chosen by the Associated Press as the best players at each position among the Eastern colleges and universities during the 1987 NCAA Division I-A football season.

== Offense ==
=== Quarterback ===
- Don McPherson, Syracuse (AP-1)
- Matt Knizner, Penn State (AP-2)

=== Running backs ===
- Craig Heyward, Pitt (AP-1)
- Blair Thomas, Penn State (AP-1)
- Jim Bell, Boston College (AP-2)
- Todd McNair, Temple (AP-2)

=== Tight end ===
- Mike Hinnant, Temple (AP-1)
- Pat Kelly, Syracuse (AP-2)

=== Wide receivers ===
- Darren Flutie, Boston College (AP-1)
- Tommy Kane, Syracuse (AP-1)
- Brian Cobb, Rutgers (AP-2)
- John Talley, West Virginia (AP-2)

=== Tackles ===
- Rick Phillips, West Virginia (AP-1)
- Dave Widell, Boston College (AP-1)
- Kevin Jones, Temple (AP-2)
- Craig Stoeppel, Syracuse (AP-2)

=== Guards ===
- Dean Caliguire, Pitt (AP-1)
- Steve Wisniewski, Penn State (AP-1)
- Bob Kovach, West Virginia (AP-2)
- Mark Stepnoski, Pitt (AP-2)

=== Center ===
- Ed Miller, Pitt (AP-1)
- Matt Felt, Navy (AP-2)

=== Placekicker ===
- Tim Vesling, Syracuse (AP-1)
- Brian Lowe, Boston College (AP-2)

== Defense ==
=== Ends ===
- Ezekial Gadson, Pitt (AP-1)
- Alec Hoke, Rutgers (AP-1)
- Burt Grossman, Pitt (AP-2)
- Dale Jackson, West Virginia (AP-2)

=== Tackles ===
- Pete Curkendall, Penn State (AP-1)
- Brad Hunt, West Virginia (AP-1)
- Rob Burnett, Syracuse (AP-2)
- Paul Frase, Syracuse (AP-2)

=== Nose guard ===
- Ted Gregory, Syracuse (AP-1)
- David Grant, West Virginia (AP-2)

=== Linebackers ===
- Trey Bauer, Penn State (AP-1)
- Bill Romanowski, Boston College (AP-1)
- Jerry Olsavsky, Pitt (AP-2)
- Joe Possenti, Temple (AP-2)

=== Defensive backs ===
- Dave Berdan, Army (AP-1)
- Markus Paul, Syracuse (AP-1)
- Gary Richard, Pitt (AP-1)
- Chris Ingram, Syracuse (AP-2)
- Quintin Jones, Pitt (AP-2)
- Billy Owens, Pitt (AP-2)
- Terry White, West Virginia (AP-2)

=== Punter ===
- Bill Rambusch, Army (AP-1)
- John Rasp, Pitt (AP-2)

== Key ==
- AP = Associated Press

== See also ==
- 1987 College Football All-America Team
