= Elliot Smith (American football) =

American football player (born 1967)

No. 28, 26
- Position: Defensive back

Personal information
- Born: August 14, 1967 (age 59); Jackson, Mississippi, U.S.
- Listed height: 6 ft 2 in (1.88 m)
- Listed weight: 192 lb (87 kg)

Career information
- High school: Callaway (Jackson)
- College: Alcorn State
- NFL draft: 1989: 5th round, 120th overall pick

Career history
- San Diego Chargers (1989); Denver Broncos (1990); Montreal Machine (1992)

Career NFL statistics
- Fumble recoveries: 1
- Stats at Pro Football Reference

Elliot Smith (born August 14, 1967) is an American former professional football player who was a defensive back in the National Football League (NFL). He played for the San Diego Chargers in 1989, Denver Broncos in 1990 and the Montreal Machine in 1992. He played college football for the Alcorn State Braves and was selected by the Chargers in the fifth round of the 1989 NFL draft with the 120th overall pick.
