= Wayne Walker (wide receiver) =

American gridiron football player (born 1966)

No. 80, 84, 4
- Position: Wide receiver

Personal information
- Born: December 27, 1966 (age 59); Waco, Texas, U.S.
- Listed height: 5 ft 8 in (1.73 m)
- Listed weight: 162 lb (73 kg)

Career information
- High school: Waco (TX) Jefferson-Moore
- College: Texas Tech
- NFL draft: 1989: undrafted

Career history
- San Diego Chargers (1989–1990); Minnesota Vikings (1991)*; Buffalo Bills (1992)*; San Antonio Riders (1992); Ottawa Rough Riders (1992–1993); Shreveport Pirates (1994–1995); Ottawa Rough Riders (1996); Tampa Bay Storm (1997–2000)
- * Offseason or practice squad member only

Awards and highlights
- First-team All-SWC (1987); Second-team All-SWC (1986)

Career NFL statistics
- Receptions: 24
- Receiving yards: 395
- Touchdowns: 1
- Stats at Pro Football Reference
- Stats at ArenaFan.com

Ronald Wayne Walker (born December 27, 1966) is an American former professional football player who was a wide receiver in the National Football League (NFL), World League of American Football (WLAF), Canadian Football League (CFL) and Arena Football League (AFL). He played for the San Diego Chargers of the NFL, the San Antonio Riders of the WLAF, the Ottawa Rough Riders and Shreveport Pirates of the CFL, and the Tampa Bay Storm of the AFL. Walker played collegiately at Texas Tech University.

Walker would serve as an assistant coach for the Waco Marshals of the National Indoor Football League in 2004.
