= Burt Grossman =

American football player and coach (born 1967)

No. 92, 69
- Position: Defensive end

Personal information
- Born: April 10, 1967 (age 59); Philadelphia, Pennsylvania, U.S.
- Listed height: 6 ft 4 in (1.93 m)
- Listed weight: 270 lb (122 kg)

Career information
- High school: Archbishop Carroll (Radnor, Pennsylvania)
- College: Pittsburgh (1985–1988)
- NFL draft: 1989: 1st round, 8th overall pick

Career history

Playing
- San Diego Chargers (1989–1993); Philadelphia Eagles (1994)

Coaching
- San Diego Strike Force (2019–2021) Head coach

Awards and highlights
- PFWA All-Rookie Team (1989); First-team All-East (1988); Second-team All-East (1987)

Career NFL statistics
- Tackles: 276
- Sacks: 43.5
- Forced fumbles: 3
- Stats at Pro Football Reference

Head coaching record
- Regular season: 1–13 (.071)

Burt L. Grossman (born April 10, 1967) is an American former professional football player who was a defensive end in the National Football League (NFL).

== Biography ==
Before becoming a professional, Grossman played college football at the University of Pittsburgh where he was a three-time All-ECAC selection. In 1989, he was selected with the eighth overall pick in the first round by the San Diego Chargers.

Grossman played six seasons in the NFL: five for the San Diego Chargers (1989–1993) and one for the Philadelphia Eagles (1994). As an NFL player, Grossman's accomplishments include forty-five quarterback sacks and three safeties.

Grossman appeared on the October 15, 1990, edition cover of Sports Illustrated under the title "Big Mouth," which chronicled his outspoken and outlandish personality. In 1996, he suffered a career-ending neck injury.

After football, Grossman was hired by WCAU in Philadelphia for its program, Eagles Hour. The program earned a regional Emmy Award in 1995, with Grossman also earning an Emmy as best sports reporter. In 1996, he published the book The Way Things Ought to Be with Bill Kushner. Currently, he is a contributor for the website "The National Football Post."

In 2019, he became the head coach of the San Diego Strike Force of the Indoor Football League (IFL). The team went 1–13 in his first season. The team played one game, a 50–36 win over the Bismarck Bucks, before the 2020 season was cancelled due to the COVID-19 pandemic. San Diego then withdrew from the 2021 season due to the pandemic and Grossman did not return to the Strike Force for the 2022 season.

He is a cousin of former Pittsburgh Steelers tight end Randy Grossman.
