= Jan Henner Putzier =

German politician (born 1984)

Member of the Landtag of Lower Saxony
- Incumbent
- Assumed office 13 September 2023
- Preceded by: Thela Wernstedt

Personal details
- Born: 12 December 1984 (age 41)
- Party: Social Democratic Party (since 2001)

Jan Henner Klaus Adolf Putzier (born 12 December 1984) is a German politician serving as a member of the Landtag of Lower Saxony since 2023. He is the chairman of the Social Democratic Party in Uelzen and Lüchow-Dannenberg.
