= Post Falls High School =

Location
- 2832 E. Poleline Ave. Post Falls, Idaho 83854; U.S. 47.729°N 116.909°W

Information
- Type: Public, four-year
- Established: 1912, 2000 (current)
- School district: Post Falls S.D. (#273)
- NCES School ID: 160267000488
- Principal: Mark Mason
- Teaching staff: 69.00 (FTE)
- Grades: 9–12
- Enrollment: 1,599 (2023–2024)
- Student to teacher ratio: 23.17
- Colors: Black & Orange
- Athletics: IHSAA Class 5A
- Athletics conference: Inland Empire League (5A)
- Mascot: Trojan
- Rivals: Coeur d'Alene, Lake City
- Newspaper: Trojan Times
- Yearbook: Trojan
- Feeder schools: Post Falls Middle School; River City Middle School
- Website: Post Falls HS

Post Falls High School is a public secondary school in located in Post Falls, Idaho. Established in 1912, the current campus of PFHS opened 26 years ago in 2000; it is the only traditional high school in the Post Falls School District. After four failed bond attempts, the $18 million levy passed by two votes in March 1998. The school colors are black and orange and the mascot is a Trojan.

== Athletics ==
PFHS competes in IHSAA Class 5A with the largest schools in the state in the Inland Empire League (5A) with nearby and Coeur d'Alene and Lake City, and also Lewiston, about two hours south. Post Falls moved up to 5A from 4A in the fall of 2006; it had moved from A-2 to A-1 (Division II) in the fall of 1985.

=== State titles ===
==== Boys ====
- Soccer (1): fall (5A) 2012
- Basketball (4): (AA) 1963; (A-3, now 2A) 1964, (5A) 2010 (5A) 2015
- Track (1): (A-2, now 3A) 1971
- Wrestling (4):(5A) 2015, 2016, 2018, 2019, 2020

==== Girls ====
- Basketball (5): (A-2, now 3A) 1983; (4A) 2002, 2003, 2013, 2018 (introduced in 1976)
- Track (1): (B, now 3A) 1973 (introduced in 1971)

== Notable alumni ==
- Jeremy Gable, playwright and game designer
- Xana Kernodle, victim in the 2022 University of Idaho murders
- Brad Lebo, football player
- Ridge Lovett, wrestler
- Rollin Putzier, football player
- Joe Tofflemire, football player
- Ian Waltz, American discus thrower
