= Victor Floyd =

American football player (born 1966)

No. 27, 26
- Position: Running back

Personal information
- Born: January 24, 1966 (age 60); Pensacola, Florida, U.S.
- Listed height: 6 ft 1 in (1.85 m)
- Listed weight: 201 lb (91 kg)

Career information
- High school: Pensacola
- College: Florida State
- NFL draft: 1989: 11th round, 287th overall pick

Career history
- San Diego Chargers (1989); Atlanta Falcons (1990)*; Sacramento Surge (1991-1992); New York/New Jersey Knights (1992); Orlando Predators (1994)
- * Offseason or practice squad member only

Career NFL statistics
- Rushing yards: 15
- Rushing average: 1.9
- Receptions: 1
- Receiving yards: 6
- Stats at Pro Football Reference

Victor Leonard Floyd (born January 24, 1966) is an American former professional football player who was a running back for the San Diego Chargers of the National Football League (NFL). He was selected by the Chargers in the 11th round of the 1989 NFL draft. He played college football for the Florida State Seminoles. He also played in the World League of American Football (WLAF) for the Sacramento Surge and New York/New Jersey Knights and in the Arena Football League (AFL) for the Orlando Predators.
