= Rollin Putzier =

American football player (1965–2018)

No. 76, 64
- Position: Defensive tackle

Personal information
- Born: December 10, 1965; Coeur d'Alene, Idaho, U.S.
- Died: April 25, 2018 (aged 52); Huntsville, Alabama, U.S.
- Listed height: 6 ft 4 in (1.93 m)
- Listed weight: 279 lb (127 kg)

Career information
- High school: Post Falls (ID)
- College: Oregon
- NFL draft: 1988: 4th round, 88th overall pick

Career history
- Green Bay Packers (1988)*; Pittsburgh Steelers (1988); San Francisco 49ers (1989); Denver Broncos (1991)*; Montreal Machine (1991–1992); London Monarchs (1995)
- * Offseason or practice squad member only

Awards and highlights
- Super Bowl champion (XXIV); First-team All-Pac-10 (1987)

Career NFL statistics
- Games played: 16
- Stats at Pro Football Reference

Rollin William Putzier (December 10, 1965 – April 25, 2018) was an American professional football player. He played defensive tackle in the National Football League (NFL), and was selected by the Green Bay Packers in the fourth round of the 1988 NFL draft. He was also a member of the Pittsburgh Steelers and San Francisco 49ers, winning Super Bowl XXIV with the 49ers, and played in the World League of American Football (WLAF) with the Montreal Machine and London Monarchs.

== Early life ==
Born and raised in northern Idaho, he graduated from Post Falls High School in 1984 and played college football for Oregon. After his senior season, Putzier was named co-team MVP with Anthony Newman. He participated in the Senior Bowl and NFL Scouting Combine at the conclusion of his college career.

== Professional career ==
Pre-draft measurables
Height	Weight	Hand span	40-yard dash	10-yard split	20-yard split	20-yard shuttle	Vertical jump	Broad jump	Bench press
6 ft 4 in (1.93 m)	279 lb (127 kg)	10 1/4 in (0.26 m)	4.99 s	1.78 s	2.96 s	4.48 s	29.5 in (0.75 m)	8 ft 10 in (2.69 m)	22 reps

=== Green Bay Packers ===
Putzier was drafted by the Green Bay Packers in the fourth round (88th overall) of the 1988 NFL draft, and signed a three-year contract with the team. He was cut at the end of training camp and heard the news from a friend before the team informed him.

=== Pittsburgh Steelers ===
On September 7, 1988, Putzier was signed by the Pittsburgh Steelers to a one-year contract. He was cut the following day after failing a physical exam, likely due to a broken foot suffered in training camp with the Packers. He re-signed with the team on November 2, and played in five games during the latter portion of the season.

Putzier was waived on July 28, 1989, after security personnel found two unloaded pistols at his training camp residence.

=== San Francisco 49ers ===
Shortly after his release from the Steelers, Putzier signed with the San Francisco 49ers.

On August 29, 1989, Putzier was suspended four games by the NFL for steroid usage. He was reinstated by the league on September 26. He played in twelve regular season games, but did not make the team's playoff roster and did not participate in Super Bowl XXIV, which the 49ers won.

He was waived by the 49ers during final roster cuts on September 3, 1990.

=== Denver Broncos ===
Putzier spent part of the 1991 training camp with the Denver Broncos before being cut.

=== Montreal Machine (WLAF) ===
Putzier spent the 1991 season with the Montreal Machine of the World League of American Football. He was drafted in the third round (26th overall) by the team. He played with the team the following year, but then the league went on hiatus.

=== London Monarchs (WLAF) ===
Putzier was drafted by the London Monarchs in the 1995 WLAF draft.

== Post-football life ==
After his football career ended, Putzier moved to Huntsville, Alabama, married, had children, divorced, and worked as a bouncer. His Super Bowl XXIV ring was stolen when Putzier was shot trying to break up a 2008 fight in the parking lot of the apartment complex he was living in. He was in the intensive care unit for three weeks after the shooting, including time spent in an induced coma and on a ventilator. He died in Huntsville on April 25, 2018, at the age of 52.
