= List of East Carolina Pirates in the NFL draft =

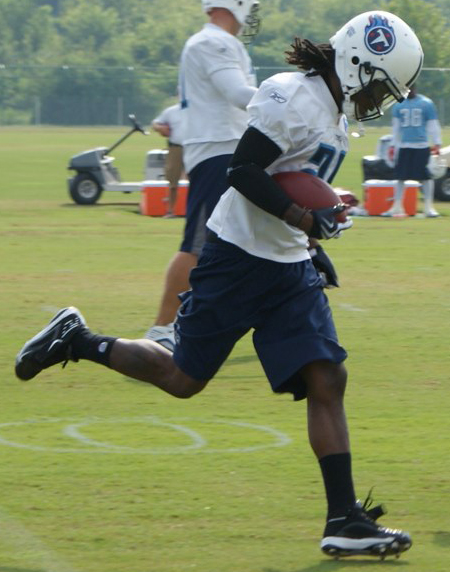
Chris Johnson at Tennessee Titans training camp

East Carolina University began playing organized American football in 1932 and has had many players go on to play professionally after graduating from the university. The school's first-ever selection was Roger Thrift, a quarterback, who was picked by the Cleveland Browns in the 1951 NFL draft. The team's selection in the most recent draft, the 2026 NFL draft, was wide receiver Anthony Smith who was selected by the Dallas Cowboys.

Every April, each National Football League (NFL) franchise seeks to add new players to its roster through a collegiate draft officially known as "the NFL Annual Player Selection Meeting" but more commonly known as the NFL Draft. Generally, the team with the worst record the previous year picks first, the next-worst team second, and so on. Teams that did not make the playoffs are ordered by their regular-season record with any remaining ties broken by strength of schedule. Playoff participants are sequenced after non-playoff teams, based on their round of elimination (wild card, division, conference, and Super Bowl). See NFL Draft Rules for further detail. Selections are made during seven different rounds.

Teams have the option of trading their picks to other teams in exchange for different picks, players, money, or a combination thereof. It is not uncommon for a team's actual draft pick to differ from their assigned draft pick, or for a team to have extra or no draft picks in any round due to these trades. Of the players selected in each draft and throughout its history, East Carolina has had 65 players picked.

The Pirates have had two first round selections in the NFL Draft; linebacker Robert Jones was picked #24 overall in the 1992 by the Dallas Cowboys, and running back Chris Johnson was also picked #24 overall in the 2008 NFL draft by the Tennessee Titans. The Pirates have had six players drafted by each of the New York Giants and the Dallas Cowboys and four by the Minnesota Vikings during the school's history. East Carolina most productive year was 1984, when the school had eight players selected in the draft.

Eight former Pirates: Zack Valentine (XIV), Earnest Byner (XXVI), Robert Jones (XXX), Devone Claybrooks (XXXVII), Guy Whimper (XLII), C.J. Wilson (Super Bowl XLV), Vonta Leach (Super Bowl XLVII), and John Jett (XXVII, XXX) have won Super Bowls with their respective teams. Five Pirates also have been elected to the Pro Bowl: Tony Collins (1983), Earnest Byner, (1990) and (1991), Jeff Blake, (1995), Rod Coleman (2005) and Chris Johnson (2008), (2009) and (2010).

== Key ==
B	Back (Note: In American and Canadian football, a back is a player who is lined up behind the linemen, the players who line up closest to the line of scrimmage.)	K	Kicker	NT	Nose tackle
C	Center	LB	Linebacker	FB	Fullback
DB	Defensive back	P	Punter	HB	Halfback
DE	Defensive end	QB	Quarterback	WR	Wide receiver
DT	Defensive tackle	RB	Running back	G	Guard
E	End	T	Offensive tackle	TE	Tight end

^ Super Bowl champion
* Active player
# Active player and Super bowl champion

== Player selection ==
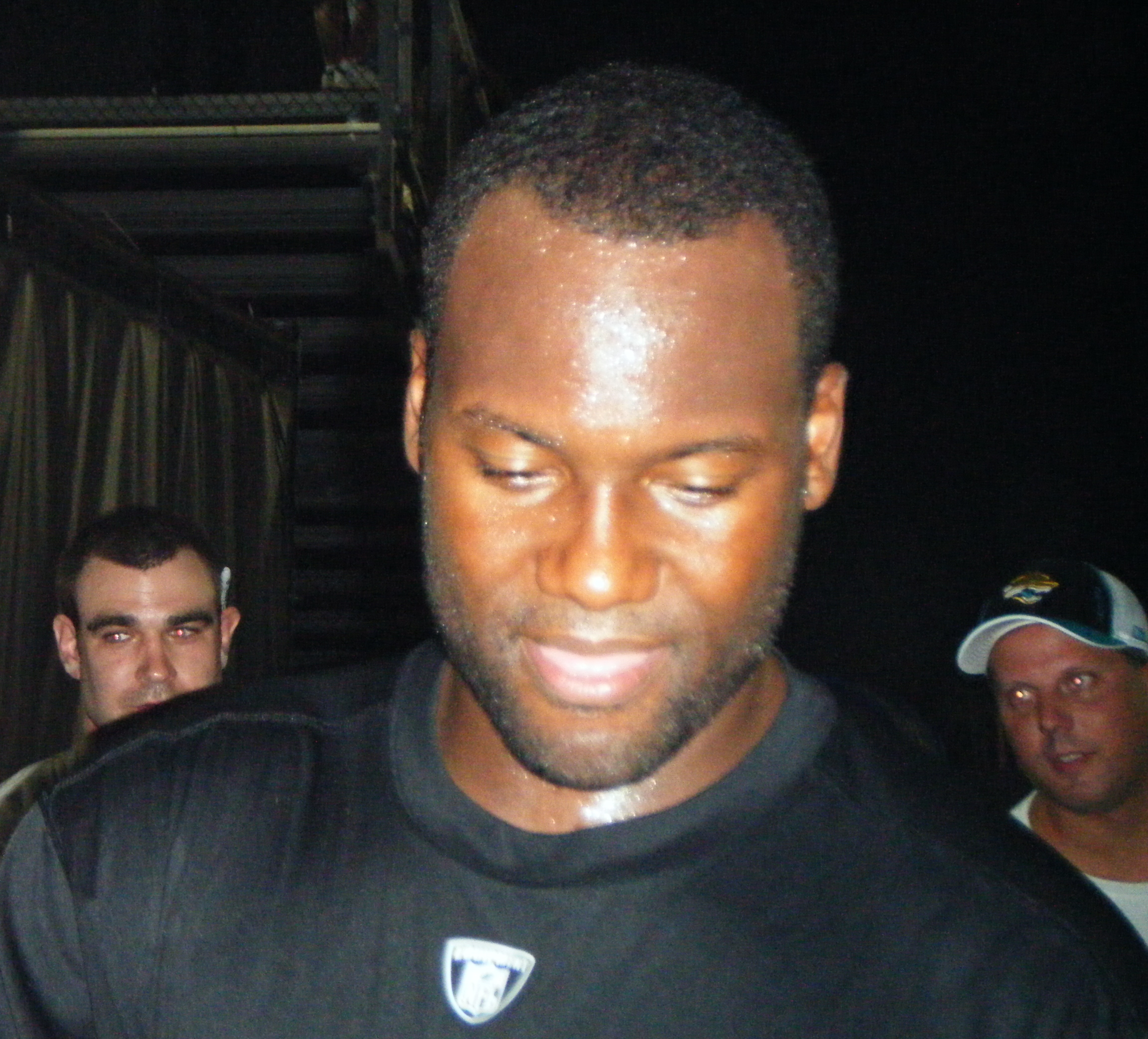
David Garrard the 108th pick overall in the 2002 draft

Draft				Player name	Position	NFL team	Notes	Ref
Year	Round	Pick	Overall	Player name	Position	NFL team	Notes	Ref
1951	28	12	339	Roger Thrift	QB	Browns	–	
1961	5	8	64	Glenn Bass	TE	Cardinals^{NFL draft}	–	
1961	23	–	–	Glenn Bass	TE	Chargers^{AFL draft}	–	
1964	14	5	187	Tom Michel	RB	Vikings^{NFL draft}	–	
1964	19	–	–	Tom Michel	RB	Raiders^{AFL draft}	–	
1969	17	1	417	Wayne Lineberry	LB	Bills	–	
1973	16	1	391	Tim Dameron	WR	Oilers	–	
1973	17	22	438	Les Strayhorn	RB	Cowboys	–	
1974	4	2	80	Carl Summerell	QB	Giants	–	
1974	4	17	95	Carlester Crumpler Sr.	RB	Bills	–	
1977	6	27	166	Reggie Pinkney	DB	Lions	–	
1978	6	28	166	Harold Randolph	LB	Cowboys	–	
1979	2	28	56	^Zack Valentine	LB	Steelers	–	
1979	6	21	158	Eddie Hicks	RB	Giants	–	
1980	11	11	288	Sam Harrell	RB	Vikings	–	
1980	12	9	314	Mike Brewington	LB	Chiefs	–	
1981	2	19	47	Tony Collins	RB	Patriots	Pro Bowl (1983)	
1982	4	2	85	George Crump	DE	Patriots	–	
1982	4	7	90	Tootie Robbins	T	Cardinals	–	
1983	2	18	46	Jody Schulz	LB	Eagles	–	
1984	2	27	55	Steve Hamilton	DE	Redskins	–	
1984	4	27	111	Terry Long	G	Steelers	–	
1984	5	3	115	Clint Harris	DB	Giants	–	
1984	5	13	125	Jeff Pegues	LB	Redskins	–	
1984	5	21	133	Hal Stephens	DE	Rams	–	
1984	10	1	253	Norwood Vann	TE	Rams	–	
1984	10	28	280	^Earnest Byner	RB	Browns	Pro Bowl (1990) (1991); 70 Greatest Redskins	
1984	11	4	284	John Robertson	T	Eagles	–	
1985	3	24	80	Stefon Adams	DB	Raiders	–	
1985	8	4	200	Ricky Nichols	WR	Colts	–	
1986	6	27	165	Kevin Walker	DB	Buccaneers	–	
1986	10	3	252	Tony Baker	RB	Falcons	–	
1988	8	5	198	Anthony Simpson	RB	Buccaneers	–	
1988	10	4	253	Ellis Dillahunt	DB	Bengals	–	
1990	3	14	67	Walter Wilson	WR	Chargers	–	
1990	5	1	110	Junior Robinson	DB	Patriots	–	
1990	7	14	179	James Singletary	LB	Colts	–	
1990	10	27	275	Anthony Thompson	LB	Broncos	–	
1991	9	3	226	Ernie Logan	DE	Falcons	–	
1992	1	24	24	^Robert Jones	LB	Cowboys	Pro Bowl (1994)	
1992	6	26	166	Jeff Blake	QB	Jets	Pro Bowl (1995)	
1992	8	14	210	Luke Fisher	TE	Vikings	–	
1992	9	26	250	Chris Hall	DB	Cowboys	–	
1992	10	22	274	Dion Johnson	WR	Oilers	–	
1993	6	8	148	Tom Scott	T	Bengals	–	
1994	6	4	165	Bernard Carter	LB	Buccaneers	–	
1994	7	8	202	Carlester Crumpler	TE	Seahawks	–	
1996	4	16	111	Emmanuel McDaniel	DB	Panthers	–	
1996	5	2	134	Jerris McPhail	RB	Dolphins	–	
1997	5	1	131	Lamont Burns	G	Jets	–	
1998	3	21	82	Larry Shannon	WR	Dolphins	–	
1999	5	20	153	Rod Coleman	DE	Raiders	Pro Bowl (2005)	
1999	6	32	231	Troy Smith	WR	Eagles	–	
2002	4	10	108	David Garrard	QB	Jaguars	Pro Bowl (2009)	
2002	7	30	241	Leonard Henry	RB	Dolphins	–	
2004	7	45	246	Brian Rimpf	T	Ravens	–	
2006	4	32	129	#Guy Whimper	T	Giants	–	
2007	5	9	146	*Aundrae Allison	KR, WR	Vikings	–	
2008	1	24	24	Chris Johnson	RB	Titans	Pro Bowl (2008), (2009), (2010)	
2009	5	13	149	Davon Drew	TE	Ravens	–	
2010	2	14	46	#Linval Joseph	DT	Giants	Pro Bowl (2017)	
2010	7	14	221	Matt Dodge	P	Giants	–	
2010	7	23	230	#C. J. Wilson	DE	Packers	–	
2011	6	11	176	*Dwayne Harris	WR	Cowboys	Pro Bowl (2017)	
2015	4	8	107	Justin Hardy	WR	Falcons	–	
2017	2	5	37	Zay Jones	WR	Bills	–	
2021	4	34	139	D'Ante Smith	OT	Bengals	–	
2025	3	12	76	Shavon Revel	CB	Cowboys	–	
2026	7	2	218	Anthony Smith	WR	Cowboys	–	

== Notable undrafted players ==
Note: No drafts held before 1920

Year	Player	Position	Debut Team	Notes
1985	Reggie Branch	RB	Washington Redskins	—
1991	George Koonce	LB	Atlanta Falcons	—
1992	John Jett	P	Minnesota Vikings	—
2000	Norris McCleary	DT	Kansas City Chiefs	—
2004	Terrance Copper	WR	Dallas Cowboys	—
2004	Vonta Leach	FB	Green Bay Packers	—
2011	Willie Smith	T	Washington Redskins	—
2012	Dominique Davis	QB	Atlanta Falcons	—
2012	Lance Lewis	WR	Washington Redskins	—
2015	Shane Carden	QB	Chicago Bears	—
2016	Josh Hawkins	CB	Green Bay Packers	—
2021	Jake Verity	K	Baltimore Ravens	—
2022	Tyler Snead	WR	Pittsburgh Steelers	—
2022	Ja'Quan McMillian	CB	Denver Broncos	—
2023	Ryan Jones	TE	New York Giants	—
2023	Holton Ahlers	QB	Seattle Seahawks	—
2023	C. J. Johnson	WR	Seattle Seahawks	—
2023	Keaton Mitchell	RB	Baltimore Ravens	—
2023	Isaiah Winstead	WR	San Francisco 49ers	—
2024	Jaylen Johnson	WR	Los Angeles Chargers	—
2024	Julius Wood	S	Dallas Cowboys	—
2025	Winston Wright Jr	WR	Cleveland Browns	—
2026	Zion Wilson	DL	Philadelphia Eagles	—
