= 1992 London Monarchs season =

World League of American Football team season

- General manager: Billy Hicks
- Head coach: Ray Willsey
- Home stadium: Wembley Stadium

Results
- Record: 2–7–1
- Division place: 3rd European
- Playoffs: Did not qualify

The 1992 London Monarchs season was the second season for the franchise in the World League of American Football (WLAF). The team was led by head coach Ray Willsey in his first year, and played its home games at Wembley Stadium in London, England. They finished the season in third place of the European Division with a record of two wins, seven losses and one tie.

== Offseason ==
=== World League draft ===
1992 London Monarchs World League draft selections
Draft order		Player name	Position	College
Round	Overall	Player name	Position	College
1	10	Roland Smith	CB	Miami (FL)
2	21	Bernard Ford	WR	UCF
3	32	William Kirksey	LB	Southern Miss
4	43	Rich McCullough	DE	Clemson
5	54	Ron Shipley	T	New Mexico
6	65	Danta Whitaker	TE	Mississippi Valley State
7	76	Charlie Young	RB	Stanford
8	87	Eddie Godfrey	CB	Western Kentucky
9	98	Clarence Seay	WR	UTEP
10	109	Anthony Thompson	LB	East Carolina
11	120	Michael Harris	OG	Grambling State
12	131	Emanuel McNeil	DT	Tennessee-Martin
13	142	Ted Popson	TE	Portland State
14	153	Marvin Hargrove	WR	Richmond
15	164	Shane Foley	QB	USC
16	175	Bob Christian	RB	Northwestern
17	186	Scott Hough	T	Maine
18	197	Elijah Austin	DT	North Carolina State
19	208	Antonio Gibson	S	Cincinnati
20	219	Ruben Mendoza	OG	Wayne State
21	230	Damon Baldwin	OG	San Diego State
22	241	Ernest Thompson	FB	Georgia Southern
23	252	Douglas Craft	S	Southern
24	263	Fred McNair	QB	Alcorn State
25	274	Patrick Moore	DT	California Poly State
26	285	Paul Alsbury	P	Southwest Texas State
27	295	Richard Booker	LB	TCU
28	305	Brian Inman	OG	Northern Colorado
29	315	Jimmy McCarney	S	Middle Tennessee

== Staff ==
1992 London Monarchs staff
Front office: General Manager – Billy Hicks; Assistant General Manager – Candida Wenham; Director of Media Relations - Jack Gallagher; Head coaches: Head Coach – Ray Willsey; Offensive coaches: Offensive Coordinator/Offensive Line – George Warhop; Quarterbacks/Receivers – Bill Schmitz; Running Backs – Ned James	Defensive coaches: Defensive Coordinator/Defensive Line – Jim Washburn; Linebackers/Special Teams – Dennis Danielson; Defensive Backs/Pass Coverages – Bob Mischak

== Roster ==
1992 London Monarchs final roster
Quarterbacks: 10 Stan Gelbaugh; 5 Fred McNair; 12 Mike Rhodes; Running backs: 20 Jeff Alexander; 1 Leonard Conley; 22 Judd Garrett; 32 David Smith; Wide receivers: 80 Bernard Ford; 7 Sean Foster; 81 Curtis McManus; 85 Tony Sargent; Tight ends: 83 Dave Harbour LS; 82 Greg Harrell; 87 Ted Popson	Offensive linemen: 60 Theo Adams T; 70 Paul Berardelli G; 67 James Harper G/C; 68 Larry Jones G; 59 Doug Marrone C; 72 Todd Oberdorf T; 64 Alvin Powell G/T; 76 Ron Shipley T; Defensive linemen: 65 Milford Hodge NT; 75 Steve Kaufusi DE; 95 Rich McCullough DE; 73 Scott Miller NT; 71 John Shannon DE; 90 Carnel Smith DE	Linebackers: 58 William Kirksey OLB; 94 Danny Lockett OLB; 53 Curtis Moore ILB; 51 Ken Sale ILB; 52 Ricky Shaw OLB; 99 Anthony Thompson OLB; 56 Rickey Williams ILB; Defensive backs: 31 Danny Crossman SS; 33 Dedrick Dodge FS; 25 Howard Feggins CB; 21 Irvin Smith CB; 34 Roland Smith CB; 42 Harvey Wilson SS; Special teams: 4 Greg Horne P	Operation Discovery: 3 (England) Phil Alexander K; 29 (England) Victor Ebubedike RB; 95 (Soviet Union) Oleg Sapega DE; 27 (England) Mike Taylor FS; Rookies in italics

== Schedule ==
Week	Date	Kickoff	Opponent	Results		Game site	Attendance	Source
Week	Date	Kickoff	Opponent	Final score	Team record	Game site	Attendance	Source
1	Sunday, March 22	6:00 p.m	New York/New Jersey Knights	W 26–20 ^{OT}	1–0	Wembley Stadium	30,167	
2	Saturday, March 28	6:00 p.m.	Frankfurt Galaxy	L 28–31	1–1	Wembley Stadium	21,799	
3	Saturday, April 4	6:00 p.m.	at Barcelona Dragons	L 7–13	1–2	Estadi Olímpic de Montjuïc	19,337	
4	Saturday, April 11		Birmingham Fire	T 17–17 ^{OT}	1–2–1	Wembley Stadium	20,370	
5	Saturday, April 18		Barcelona Dragons	L 0–9	1–3–1	Wembley Stadium	18,518	
6	Sunday, April 26		Sacramento Surge	L 26–31	1–4–1	Wembley Stadium	18,653	
7	Saturday, May 3		at New York/New Jersey Knights	L 13–41	1–5–1	Giants Stadium	30,112	
8	Saturday, May 10		at Orlando Thunder	L 0–9	1–6–1	Florida Citrus Bowl	20,268	
9	Sunday, May 17		at Montreal Machine	W 45–13	2–6–1	Olympic Stadium	14,637	
10	Saturday, May 23	7:00 p.m.	at Frankfurt Galaxy	L 16–19	2–7–1	Waldstadion	43,259	

== Standings ==
European Division
Team	W	L	T	PCT	PF	PA	DIV	STK
Barcelona Dragons	5	5	0	.500	104	161	3–1	L4
Frankfurt Galaxy	3	7	0	.300	150	257	3–1	W1
London Monarchs	2	7	1	.250	178	203	0–4	L1

== Game summaries ==
=== Week 1: vs New York/New Jersey Knights ===
Week One: New York/New Jersey Knights at London Monarchs – Game summary

Quarter	1	2	3	4	OT	Total
NY/NJ	0	10	0	10	0	20
London	3	3	7	7	6	26

at Wembley Stadium, Wembley, England

- Date: Sunday, March 22
- Game time: 6:00 p.m.
- Game attendance: 30,167

=== Week 2: vs Frankfurt Galaxy ===
Week Two: Frankfurt Galaxy at London Monarchs – Game summary

Quarter	1	2	3	4	Total
Frankfurt	10	3	8	10	31
London	0	14	14	0	28

at Wembley Stadium, Wembley, England

- Date: Saturday, March 28
- Game time: 6:00 p.m.
- Game attendance: 21,799

Game information

First quarter

- Frankfurt – 19-yard field goal by Robbie Keen, 8:08.
- Frankfurt – Chad Fortune 5-yard touchdown reception from Mike Perez, Robbie Keen kick good, 4:04.

Second quarter

- Frankfurt – 37-yard field goal by Robbie Keen, 14:26.
- London – Tony Sargent 16-yard touchdown reception from Stan Gelbaugh, Phil Alexander kick good, 7:26.
- London – Jeff Alexander 1-yard touchdown run, Phil Alexander kick good, 0:32.

Third quarter

- London – Bernard Ford 32-yard touchdown reception from Stan Gelbaugh, Phil Alexander kick good, 13:32.
- London – Sean Foster 98-yard touchdown reception from Stan Gelbaugh, Phil Alexander kick good, 2:13.
- Frankfurt – Richard Buchanan 31-yard touchdown reception from Mike Perez, Tony Baker two-point conversion reception from Mike Perez, 0:49.

Fourth quarter

- Frankfurt – Richard Buchanan 6-yard touchdown reception from Mike Perez, Robbie Keen kick good, 4:36.
- Frankfurt – 20-yard field goal by Robbie Keen, 0:12.

Leading passers

- Frankfurt – Mike Perez – 30/53, 353 yards, 3 touchdowns, 1 interception.
- London – Stan Gelbaugh – 21/44, 323 yards, 3 touchdowns, 2 interceptions.

Leading rushers

- Frankfurt – Mike Perez – 2 rushes, 24 yards.
- London – Jeff Alexander – 14 rushes, 45 yards, 1 touchdown.

Leading receivers

- Frankfurt – Richard Buchanan – 5 receptions, 101 yards, 2 touchdowns.
- London – Sean Foster – 4 receptions, 142 yards, 1 touchdown.

=== Week 3: at Barcelona Dragons ===
Week Three: London Monarchs at Barcelona Dragons – Game summary

Quarter	1	2	3	4	Total
London	0	0	0	7	7
Barcelona	7	6	0	0	13

at Estadi Olímpic de Montjuïc, Barcelona, Spain

- Date: Saturday, April 4
- Game time: 6:00 p.m.
- Game attendance: 19,337

Game information

First quarter

- Barcelona – Thomas Woods 86-yard touchdown reception from Scott Erney, Teddy Garcia kick good, 9:55.

Second quarter

- Barcelona – 22-yard field goal by Teddy Garcia, 8:58.
- Barcelona – 22-yard field goal by Teddy Garcia, 0:24.

Third quarter

- No scoring.

Fourth quarter

- London – Bernard Ford 29-yard touchdown reception from Stan Gelbaugh, Phil Alexander kick good, 6:20.

Leading passers

- London – Stan Gelbaugh – 16/29, 224 yards, 1 touchdown, 2 interceptions.
- Barcelona – Scott Erney – 15/33, 181 yards, 1 touchdown, 1 interception.

Leading rushers

- London – Jeff Alexander – 12 rushes, 36 yards.
- Barcelona – Paul Palmer – 22 rushes, 62 yards.

Leading receivers

- London – Tony Sargent – 4 receptions, 80 yards.
- Barcelona – Thomas Woods – 2 receptions, 95 yards, 1 touchdown.

=== Week 4: vs Birmingham Fire ===
Week Four: Birmingham Fire at London Monarchs – Game summary

Quarter	1	2	3	4	OT	Total
Birmingham	7	0	0	10	0	17
London	0	10	7	0	0	17

at Wembley Stadium, Wembley, England

- Date: Saturday, April 11
- Game attendance: 20,370

=== Week 5: vs Barcelona Dragons ===
Week Five: Barcelona Dragons at London Monarchs – Game summary

Quarter	1	2	3	4	Total
Barcelona	0	6	0	3	9
London	0	0	0	0	0

at Wembley Stadium, Wembley, England

- Date: Saturday, April 18
- Game attendance: 18,518
