= 1990 Denver Broncos season =

American football team season

- Owner: Pat Bowlen
- General manager: John Beake
- Head coach: Dan Reeves
- Offensive coordinator: Chan Gailey
- Defensive coordinator: Wade Phillips
- Home stadium: Mile High Stadium

Results
- Record: 5–11
- Division place: 5th AFC West
- Playoffs: Did not qualify
- Pro Bowlers: RB Bobby Humphrey; S Steve Atwater; S Dennis Smith

Uniform
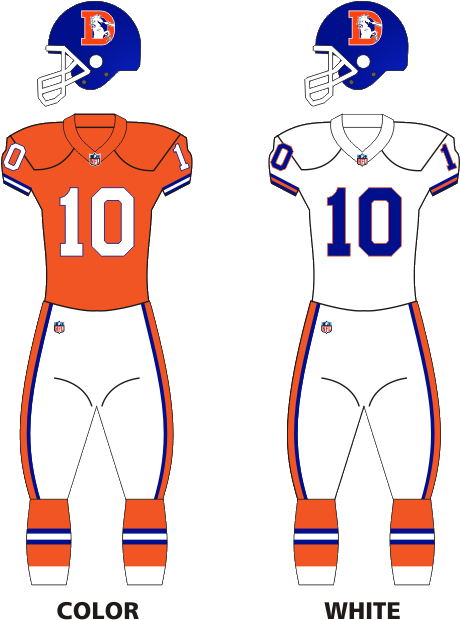

The 1990 season was the Denver Broncos' 31st year in professional football and their 21st with the National Football League (NFL). After reaching Super Bowl XXIV, the Broncos struggled and finished with their worst post-merger record in a 16-game season, 5–11. This mark would be eclipsed by the 2010 edition of the team, which finished 4–12. 8 of their 11 losses were by 8 points or less.

== Off Season ==
=== NFL draft ===
1990 Denver Broncos draft
Round	Pick	Player	Position	College	Notes
2	52	Alton Montgomery	S	Houston	
4	82	Jeroy Robinson	ILB	Texas A&M	
5	111	Jeff Davidson	G	Ohio State	
5	136	Le-Lo Lang	CB	Washington	
6	164	Ronnie Haliburton	OLB	LSU	
7	192	Shannon Sharpe * ^{†}	TE	Savannah State	
8	219	Brad Leggett	C	USC	
9	247	Todd Ellis	QB	South Carolina	
10	275	Anthony Thompson	OLB	East Carolina	
Made roster † Pro Football Hall of Fame * Made at least one Pro Bowl during career

== Personnel ==
1990 Denver Broncos staff
Front office: President and Chief Executive Officer – Pat Bowlen; General Manager – John Beake; Director of Football Operations – Lide Huggins; Director of Player Personnel – Reed Johnson; Administrative Assistant – Joe DeCamillis; Head coaches: Vice President/Head Coach – Dan Reeves; Special Assistant – Marvin Bass; Offensive coaches: Offensive Coordinator/Wide Receivers – Chan Gailey; Quarterbacks – Mike Shanahan; Running backs – Mo Forte; Tight Ends/Assistant Offensive line – Pete Mangurian; Offensive line – George Henshaw	Defensive coaches: Defensive Coordinator – Wade Phillips; Defensive line – Earl Leggett; Linebackers – Mike Nolan; Defensive Backs – Charlie Waters; Defensive assistant – Barney Chavous; Special teams coaches: Special Teams – Harold Richardson; Strength and conditioning: Strength/Conditioning – Al Miller

== Roster ==
1990 Denver Broncos roster
Quarterbacks (QB): 7 John Elway; 8 Gary Kubiak; Running backs (RB): 32 Mel Bratton FB; 35 Blake Ezor KR; 26 Bobby Humphrey; 31 Kerry Porter; 30 Steve Sewell FB; 23 Sammy Winder; Wide receivers (WR): 80 Mark Jackson; 82 Vance Johnson PR; 85 Tim Stallworth; 83 Mike Young; Tight ends (TE): 87 Paul Green; 88 Clarence Kay; 81 Shannon Sharpe; 86 Chris Verhulst	Offensive linemen (OL): 64 Scott Beavers G; 62 Jeff Davidson G; 63 Sean Farrell G; 69 Darrell Hamilton T; 72 Keith Kartz C; 76 Ken Lanier T; 79 Dave Widell; 67 Doug Widell G; Defensive linemen (DL): 99 David Galloway DE; 90 Ron Holmes DE; 71 Greg Kragen NT; 91 Warren Powers DE; 61 Andre Townsend	Linebackers (LB): 56 Michael Brooks ILB; 55 Rick Dennison ILB; 73 Simon Fletcher OLB; 93 Ronnie Haliburton OLB; 59 Tim Lucas OLB; 77 Karl Mecklenburg LB; 52 Jeff Mills OLB; 53 Anthony Thompson LB; Defensive backs (DB): 27 Steve Atwater FS; 20 Kevin Clark; 25 Kip Corrington FS; 24 Wymon Henderson CB; 21 Le-Lo Lang CB; 22 Alton Montgomery CB; 48 Randy Robbins; 49 Dennis Smith SS; Special teams (ST): 2 Mike Horan P; 9 David Treadwell K	Practice squad: -- Paris McCurdy LB; Reserve: 34 Tyrone Braxton CB (IR); 92 Alphonso Carreker DE (IR); 58 Scott Curtis LB (IR); 66 Jim Juriga G/T (IR); 51 Marc Munford LB (IR); 84 Ricky Nattiel WR (IR); 75 Brent Parkinson T (IR); 28 Elliot Smith CB (NF-Ill.); 65 Monte Smith G (NF-Inj.); 94 Jim Szymanski DE (IR); 47 active, 10 inactive, 1 practice squad Rookies in italics

== Regular season ==
=== Schedule ===
Week	Date	Opponent	Result	Record	Venue	Attendance
1	September 9	at **Los Angeles Raiders**	**L** 9–14	0–1	Los Angeles Memorial Coliseum	54,206
2	September 17	**Kansas City Chiefs**	**W** 24–23	1–1	Mile High Stadium	75,277
3	September 23	**Seattle Seahawks**	**W** 34–31 (OT)	2–1	Mile High Stadium	75,290
4	September 30	at Buffalo Bills	**L** 28–29	2–2	Rich Stadium	74,393
5	October 8	Cleveland Browns	**L** 29–30	2–3	Mile High Stadium	74,814
6	October 14	Pittsburgh Steelers	**L** 17–34	2–4	Mile High Stadium	74,285
7	October 21	at Indianapolis Colts	**W** 27–17	3–4	Hoosier Dome	59,850
8	Bye					
9	November 4	at Minnesota Vikings	**L** 22–27	3–5	Hubert H. Humphrey Metrodome	57,331
10	November 11	at **San Diego Chargers**	**L** 7–19	3–6	Jack Murphy Stadium	59,557
11	November 18	Chicago Bears	**L** 13–16	3–7	Mile High Stadium	75,013
12	November 22	at Detroit Lions	**L** 27–40	3–8	Pontiac Silverdome	73,896
13	December 2	**Los Angeles Raiders**	**L** 20–23	3–9	Mile High Stadium	74,162
14	December 9	at **Kansas City Chiefs**	**L** 20–31	3–10	Arrowhead Stadium	74,347
15	December 16	**San Diego Chargers**	**W** 20–10	4–10	Mile High Stadium	64,919
16	December 23	at **Seattle Seahawks**	**L** 12–17	4–11	Kingdome	55,845
17	December 30	Green Bay Packers	**W** 22–13	5–11	Mile High Stadium	46,943
Note: Intra-division opponents are in **bold** text.

=== Game summaries ===
==== Week 2 vs Chiefs ====
Week Two: Kansas City Chiefs (1–0) at Denver Broncos (0–1)

Quarter	1	2	3	4	Total
Chiefs	3	6	0	14	**23**
**Broncos**	7	7	7	3	**24**

at Mile High Stadium, Denver, Colorado

- Date: September 17
- Game time: 7:00 p.m. MST
- Game weather: 62 °F (17 °C)
- Game attendance: 75,277
- Referee: Jim Tunney
- TV: ABC
- Box Score, Box Score

Game information

**First quarter**

- KC – Nick Lowery 39-yard field goal, 3:18. Chiefs 3–0. Drive:
- DEN – Bobby Humphrey 37-yard run (David Treadwell kick), 0:48. Broncos 7–3. Drive:

**Second quarter**

- KC – Nick Lowery 29-yard field goal, 11:33. Broncos 7–6. Drive:
- DEN – Bobby Humphrey 6-yard run (David Treadwell kick), 7:07. Broncos 14–6. Drive:
- KC – Nick Lowery 31-yard field goal, 0:04. Broncos 14–9. Drive:

**Third quarter**

- DEN – John Elway 2-yard run (David Treadwell kick), 6:49. Broncos 21–9. Drive:

**Fourth quarter**

- KC – Stephone Paige 16-yard pass from Steve DeBerg (Nick Lowery kick), 8:01. Broncos 21–16. Drive:
- KC – Stephone Paige 83-yard pass from Steve DeBerg (Nick Lowery kick), 1:44. Chiefs 23–21. Drive:
- DEN – David Treadwell 22-yard field goal, 0:00. Broncos 24–23. Drive:

Top passers

- KC – Steve DeBerg – 26/45, 395 yards, 2 TD
- DEN – John Elway – 14/30, 263 yards

Top rushers

- KC – Christian Okoye – 20 rushes, 69 yards
- DEN – Bobby Humphrey – 19 rushes, 132 yards, 2 TD

Top receivers

- KC – Stephone Paige – 10 receptions, 206 yards, 2 TD
- DEN – Vance Johnson – 6 receptions, 150 yards

- Steve Atwater hit on Christian Okoye

==== Week 12 at Lions ====
Week Twelve: Denver Broncos (3–7) at Detroit Lions (3–7)

Quarter	1	2	3	4	Total
Broncos	7	10	3	7	**27**
**Lions**	21	6	7	6	**40**

at Pontiac Silverdome, Pontiac, Michigan

- Date: November 22
- Game time: 12:30 p.m. EST
- Game weather: Indoors (dome)
- Game attendance: 73,896
- Referee: Dick Hantak
- TV announcers (NBC): Dick Enberg and Bill Walsh
- Box Score

Game information

**First quarter**

- DET – Richard Johnson 11-yard pass from Bob Gagliano (Eddie Murray kick), 10:11. Lions 7–0. Drive:
- DEN – Melvin Bratton 1-yard run (David Treadwell kick), 6:45. Tie 7–7. Drive:
- DET – Barry Sanders 7-yard run (Eddie Murray kick), 4:32. Lions 14–7. Drive:
- DET – Richard Johnson 43-yard pass from Bob Gagliano (Eddie Murray kick), 0:50. Lions 21–7. Drive:

**Second quarter**

- DET – Eddie Murray 24-yard field goal, 1:32. Lions 24–7. Drive:
- DEN – David Treadwell 24-yard field goal, 8:40. Lions 24–10. Drive:
- DEN – Wymon Henderson 48-yard interception return (David Treadwell kick), 7:40. Lions 24–17.
- DET – Eddie Murray 32-yard field goal, 1:55. Lions 27–17. Drive:

**Third quarter**

- DEN – David Treadwell 32-yard field goal, 9:32. Lions 27–20. Drive:
- DET – Barry Sanders 35-yard pass from Bob Gagliano (Eddie Murray kick), 6:32. Lions 34–20. Drive:

**Fourth quarter**

- DEN – Melvin Bratton 1-yard run (David Treadwell kick), 14:14. Lions 34–27. Drive:
- DET – Eddie Murray 43-yard field goal, 3:43. Lions 37–27. Drive:
- DET – Eddie Murray 45-yard field goal, 2:51. Lions 40–27. Drive:

Top passers

- DEN – John Elway – 24/36, 246 yards, INT
- DET – Bob Gagliano – 18/30, 248 yards, 3 TD, INT

Top rushers

- DEN – Bobby Humphrey – 16 rushes, 53 yards
- DET – Barry Sanders – 23 rushes, 147 yards, TD

Top receivers

- DEN – Ricky Nattiel – 3 receptions, 50 yards
- DET – Richard Johnson – 5 receptions, 83 yards, 2 TD

==== Week 14 at Chiefs ====
Week Fourteen: Denver Broncos (3–9) at Kansas City Chiefs (8–4)

Quarter	1	2	3	4	Total
Broncos	0	13	0	7	**20**
**Chiefs**	7	3	7	14	**31**

at Arrowhead Stadium, Kansas City, Missouri

- Date: December 9
- Game time: 4:00 p.m.
- Game weather: 44 °F (7 °C)
- Game attendance: 74,347
- Referee: Gordon McCarter
- Box Score, Box Score

Game information

**First quarter**

- KC – Stephone Paige 48-yard pass from Steve DeBerg (Nick Lowery kick), 11:54. Chiefs 7–0. Drive:

**Second quarter**

- DEN – Shannon Sharpe 5-yard pass from John Elway (kick failed), 7:46. Chiefs 7–6. Drive:
- DEN – Mike Young 16-yard pass from John Elway (David Treadwell kick), 1:28. Broncos 13–7. Drive:
- KC – Nick Lowery 33-yard field goal, 0:03. Broncos 13–10. Drive:

**Third quarter**

- KC – Barry Word 1-yard run (Nick Lowery kick), 6:32. Chiefs 17–13. Drive:

**Fourth quarter**

- KC – Danta Whitaker 1-yard pass from Steve DeBerg (Nick Lowery kick), 14:37. Chiefs 24–13. Drive:
- DEN – Bobby Humphrey 2-yard run (David Treadwell kick), 9:51. Chiefs 24–20. Drive:
- KC – Robb Thomas 27-yard pass from Steve DeBerg (Nick Lowery kick), 2:28. Chiefs 31–20. Drive:

Top passers

- DEN – John Elway – 24/36, 328 yards, 2 TD, INT
- KC – Steve DeBerg – 18/27, 254 yards, 3 TD

Top rushers

- DEN – Bobby Humphrey – 21 rushes, 56 yards, TD
- KC – Barry Word – 16 rushes, 72 yards, TD

Top receivers

- DEN – Mark Jackson – 5 receptions, 90 yards
- KC – Stephone Paige – 3 receptions, 75 yards, TD

=== Standings ===
AFC West
	W	L	T	PCT	DIV	CONF	PF	PA	STK
^{(2)} Los Angeles Raiders	12	4	0	.750	6–2	9–3	337	268	W5
^{(5)} Kansas City Chiefs	11	5	0	.688	5–3	7–5	369	257	W2
Seattle Seahawks	9	7	0	.563	4–4	7–5	306	286	W2
San Diego Chargers	6	10	0	.375	2–6	5–9	315	281	L3
Denver Broncos	5	11	0	.313	3–5	4–8	331	374	W1
