= 1992 Frankfurt Galaxy season =

World League of American Football team season

- Owner: World League
- General manager: Oliver Luck
- Head coach: Jack Elway
- Home stadium: Waldstadion

Results
- Record: 3–7
- Division place: 2nd European
- Playoffs: Did not qualify

The 1992 Frankfurt Galaxy season was the second season for the team in the World League of American Football (WLAF). The team was led by head coach Jack Elway in his second year, and played its home games at Waldstadion in Frankfurt, Germany. They finished the season in second place of the European Division with a record of three wins and seven losses.

== Offseason ==
=== World League draft ===
1992 Frankfurt Galaxy World League draft selections
Draft order		Player name	Position	College
Round	Choice	Player name	Position	College
1		Michael Simmons	DE	Mississippi State
2		Jon Carter	DE	Pittsburgh
3		Anthony Wallace	RB	California
4		Kerry Simien	WR	Texas A&I
5		Pat McGuirk	CB	Cal Poly
6		Nasrallah Worthen	WR	North Carolina State
7		Dave Senczyszyn	T	Wisconsin
8		Lyneil Mayo	LB	San Jose State
9		Kirk Kirkpatrick	TE	Florida
10		Dale Joseph	CB	Howard Payne
11		Mike Bernard	T	Syracuse
12		Bill Ragans	S	Florida State
13		Robert Claiborne	WR	San Diego State
14		Spencer Hammond	LB	Alabama
15		Ralph Martini	QB	San Jose State
16		Erwin Grabisna	DL	Case Western Reserve
17		Joe Meerten	TE	Oregon
18		Ben Washington	CB	Southern Mississippi
19		Gerald Hudson	RB	Oklahoma State
20		John Cook	DT	Washington
21		George Muraoka	DT	San Jose State
22		Kelly John-Lewis	T	Washington
23		William Lohsen	P/K	Kansas
24		Kevin Evans	WR	San Jose State
25		Lew Barnes	WR	Oregon
26		Charles Bell	CB	Baylor
27		John Hopkins	K	Stanford
28		Dirk Borgognone	K	Pacific
29		Andreas Motzkus	WR	Operation Discovery

== Staff ==
1992 Frankfurt Galaxy staff
Front office: General Manager – Oliver Luck; Director of Football Operations – Bill Peterson; Head coaches: Head Coach/Quarterbacks – Jack Elway; Offensive coaches: Offensive Coordinator/Offensive Line – Bob Beers; Running Backs/Tight Ends – Joe Burke; Wide Receivers – Jack Swarthout	Defensive coaches: Defensive Coordinator/Linebackers – Claude Gilbert; Defensive Line – Dan Geyer; Defensive Backs – Kevin Clark

== Roster ==
1992 Frankfurt Galaxy final roster
Quarterbacks: 10 Jeff Bridewell; 8 Chris Cochrane; 14 Alex Espinoza; 13 Ralph Martini; 11 Mike Perez; Running backs: 33 Tony Baker; 25 Steve Bartalo; 45 Harry Jackson; 24 Anthony Wallace; Wide receivers: 83 Lew Barnes; 89 Richard Buchanan; 87 Jason Johnson; 85 Curtis Mayfield; Tight ends: 81 Chad Fortune; 80 Charles Henry	Offensive linemen: 79 Mike Bernard T; 71 Eric Crigler T; 63 David Diaz-Infante C; 65 Garry Frank G; 73 Jeff Mickel T; 67 Billy Poe G; 58 Eric Still T; 51 Mark Tucker G/C; Defensive linemen: 72 Jon Carter DE; 78 Kevin Hendrix DE; 64 Garry Howe NT; 76 George Muraoka NT; 96 Michael Simmons DE	Linebackers: 56 Lyneil Mayo OLB; 55 Pat Moorer ILB; 57 Yepi Pauu ILB; 50 Kevin Wolfolk OLB; 59 Willie Wright OLB; Defensive backs: 46 Tim Broady SS; 23 Greg Eaglin CB; 28 Joe Greenwood FS; 22 Jeff Hammerschmidt FS; 31 Dale Joseph CB; 26 Pat McGuirk CB; 29 Bill Ragans SS; 27 Cedric Stallworth CB; 34 Johnny Thomas CB; Special teams: 9 Robbie Keen K/P	Operation Discovery: 70 (West Germany) Olaf Hampel NT; 77 (West Germany) Gerald Olszewski G; 54 (West Germany) Dirk Reessing ILB; Rookies in italics

== Schedule ==
Week	Date	Kickoff	Opponent	Results		Game site	Attendance	Source
Week	Date	Kickoff	Opponent	Final score	Team record	Game site	Attendance	Source
Preseason
	Sunday, March 15	3:00 p.m.	New York/New Jersey Knights	L 9–28	0–1	Waldstadion	16,471	
Regular season
1	Saturday, March 21	6:00 p.m.	at Barcelona Dragons	W 17–0	1–0	Estadi Olímpic de Montjuïc	25,788	
2	Saturday, March 28	6:00 p.m.	at London Monarchs	W 31–28	2–0	Wembley Stadium	21,799	
3	Sunday, April 5	7:00 p.m.	Birmingham Fire	L 7–17	2–1	Waldstadion	33,857	
4	Saturday, April 11	7:00 p.m.	Barcelona Dragons	L 17–20	2–2	Waldstadion	34,376	
5	Saturday, April 18	8:00 p.m.	at New York/New Jersey Knights	L 21–24	2–3	Giants Stadium	24,943	
6	Saturday, April 25	7:00 p.m.	Orlando Thunder	L 0–38	2–4	Waldstadion	38,104	
7	Saturday, May 2	8:00 p.m.	at Ohio Glory	L 17–20	2–5	Ohio Stadium	41,853	
8	Saturday, May 9	5:00 p.m.	at Sacramento Surge	L 7–51	2–6	Hornet Stadium	22,720	
9	Sunday, May 17	7:00 p.m.	San Antonio Riders	L 14–43	2–7	Waldstadion	31,641	
10	Saturday, May 23	7:00 p.m.	London Monarchs	W 19–16	3–7	Waldstadion	43,259	

== Standings ==
European Division
Team	W	L	T	PCT	PF	PA	DIV	STK
Barcelona Dragons	5	5	0	.500	104	161	3–1	L4
Frankfurt Galaxy	3	7	0	.300	150	257	3–1	W1
London Monarchs	2	7	1	.250	178	203	0–4	L1

== Game summaries ==
=== Week 1: at Barcelona Dragons ===
Week One: Frankfurt Galaxy at Barcelona Dragons – Game summary

Quarter	1	2	3	4	Total
Frankfurt	0	0	3	14	17
Barcelona	0	0	0	0	0

at Estadi Olímpic de Montjuïc, Barcelona, Spain

- Date: Saturday, March 21
- Game time: 6:00 p.m.
- Game attendance: 25,788

Game information

First quarter

- No scoring.

Second quarter

- No scoring.

Third quarter

- Frankfurt – 37-yard field goal by Robbie Keen, 5:29.

Fourth quarter

- Frankfurt – Chad Fortune 38-yard touchdown reception from Mike Perez, Robbie Keen kick good, 14:50.
- Frankfurt – Fumble recovery in end zone for touchdown by Willie Wright, Robbie Keen kick good, 0:54.

Leading passers

- Frankfurt – Mike Perez – 18/31, 209 yards, 1 touchdown, 1 interception.
- Barcelona – Scott Erney – 13/29, 149 yards.

Leading rushers

- Frankfurt – Tony Baker – 19 rushes, 46 yards.
- Barcelona – Scott Erney – 3 rushes, 22 yards.

Leading receivers

- Frankfurt – Chad Fortune – 5 receptions, 87 yards, 1 touchdown.
- Barcelona – Thomas Woods – 4 receptions, 60 yards.

=== Week 2: at London Monarchs ===
Week Two: Frankfurt Galaxy at London Monarchs – Game summary

Quarter	1	2	3	4	Total
Frankfurt	10	3	8	10	31
London	0	14	14	0	28

at Wembley Stadium, Wembley, England

- Date: Saturday, March 28
- Game time: 6:00 p.m.
- Game attendance: 21,799

Game information

First quarter

- Frankfurt – 19-yard field goal by Robbie Keen, 8:08.
- Frankfurt – Chad Fortune 5-yard touchdown reception from Mike Perez, Robbie Keen kick good, 4:04.

Second quarter

- Frankfurt – 37-yard field goal by Robbie Keen, 14:26.
- London – Tony Sargent 16-yard touchdown reception from Stan Gelbaugh, Phil Alexander kick good, 7:26.
- London – Jeff Alexander 1-yard touchdown run, Phil Alexander kick good, 0:32.

Third quarter

- London – Bernard Ford 32-yard touchdown reception from Stan Gelbaugh, Phil Alexander kick good, 13:32.
- London – Sean Foster 98-yard touchdown reception from Stan Gelbaugh, Phil Alexander kick good, 2:13.
- Frankfurt – Richard Buchanan 31-yard touchdown reception from Mike Perez, Tony Baker two-point conversion reception from Mike Perez, 0:49.

Fourth quarter

- Frankfurt – Richard Buchanan 6-yard touchdown reception from Mike Perez, Robbie Keen kick good, 4:36.
- Frankfurt – 20-yard field goal by Robbie Keen, 0:12.

Leading passers

- Frankfurt – Mike Perez – 30/53, 353 yards, 3 touchdowns, 1 interception.
- London – Stan Gelbaugh – 21/44, 323 yards, 3 touchdowns, 2 interceptions.

Leading rushers

- Frankfurt – Mike Perez – 2 rushes, 24 yards.
- London – Jeff Alexander – 14 rushes, 45 yards, 1 touchdown.

Leading receivers

- Frankfurt – Richard Buchanan – 5 receptions, 101 yards, 2 touchdowns.
- London – Sean Foster – 4 receptions, 142 yards, 1 touchdown.

=== Week 3: vs Birmingham Fire ===
Week Three: Birmingham Fire at Frankfurt Galaxy – Game summary

Quarter	1	2	3	4	Total
Birmingham	0	14	0	3	17
Frankfurt	0	0	7	0	7

at Waldstadion, Frankfurt, Germany

- Date: Sunday, April 5
- Game time: 7:00 p.m.
- Game attendance: 33,857

Game information

First quarter

- No scoring.

Second quarter

- Birmingham – Elroy Harris 9-yard touchdown reception from Mike Norseth, Philip Doyle kick good, 8:45.
- Birmingham – Elroy Harris 1-yard touchdown run, Philip Doyle kick good, 0:10.

Third quarter

- Frankfurt – Tony Baker 1-yard touchdown run, Robbie Keen kick good, 3:41.

Fourth quarter

- Birmingham – 31-yard field goal by Philip Doyle, 11:29.

Leading passers

- Birmingham – Mike Norseth – 7/15, 108 yards, 1 touchdown, 1 interception.
- Frankfurt – Mike Perez – 26/34, 218 yards, 1 interception.

Leading rushers

- Birmingham – Jim Bell – 11 rushes, 53 yards.
- Frankfurt – Tony Baker – 11 rushes, 38 yards, 1 touchdown.

Leading receivers

- Birmingham – Willie Bouyer – 2 receptions, 87 yards.
- Frankfurt – Curtis Mayfield – 4 receptions, 52 yards.

=== Week 4: vs Barcelona Dragons ===
Week Four: Barcelona Dragons at Frankfurt Galaxy – Game summary

Quarter	1	2	3	4	Total
Barcelona	0	13	0	7	20
Frankfurt	17	0	0	0	17

at Waldstadion, Frankfurt, Germany

- Date: Saturday, April 11
- Game time: 7:00 p.m.
- Game attendance: 34,376

=== Week 5: at New York/New Jersey Knights ===
Week Five: Frankfurt Galaxy at New York/New Jersey Knights – Game summary

Quarter	1	2	3	4	Total
Frankfurt	0	14	0	7	21
NY/NJ	14	0	7	3	24

at Giants Stadium, East Rutherford, New Jersey

- Date: Saturday, April 18
- Game time: 8:00 p.m.
- Game attendance: 24,943

=== Week 6: vs Orlando Thunder ===
Week Six: Orlando Thunder at Frankfurt Galaxy – Game summary

Quarter	1	2	3	4	Total
Orlando	0	21	10	7	38
Frankfurt	0	0	0	0	0

at Waldstadion, Frankfurt, Germany

- Date: Saturday, April 25
- Game time: 7:00 p.m.
- Game attendance: 38,104

=== Week 7: at Ohio Glory ===
Week Seven: Frankfurt Galaxy at Ohio Glory – Game summary

Quarter	1	2	3	4	Total
Frankfurt	7	0	7	3	17
Ohio	7	7	0	6	20

at Ohio Stadium, Columbus, Ohio

- Date: Saturday, May 2
- Game time: 8:00 p.m.
- Game attendance: 41,853

=== Week 8: at Sacramento Surge ===
Week Eight: Frankfurt Galaxy at Sacramento Surge – Game summary

Quarter	1	2	3	4	Total
Frankfurt	0	7	0	0	7
Sacramento	10	20	14	7	51

at Hornet Stadium, Sacramento, California

- Date: Saturday, May 9
- Game time: 5:00 p.m.
- Game attendance: 22,720

=== Week 9: vs San Antonio Riders ===
Week Nine: San Antonio Riders at Frankfurt Galaxy – Game summary

Quarter	1	2	3	4	Total
San Antonio	3	17	7	16	43
Frankfurt	0	0	7	7	14

at Waldstadion, Frankfurt, Germany

- Date: Sunday, May 17
- Game time: 7:00 p.m.
- Game attendance: 31,641

=== Week 10: vs London Monarchs ===
Week Ten: London Monarchs at Frankfurt Galaxy – Game summary

Quarter	1	2	3	4	Total
London	6	3	7	0	16
Frankfurt	7	7	2	3	19

at Waldstadion, Frankfurt, Germany

- Date: Saturday, May 23
- Game time: 7:00 p.m.
- Game attendance: 43,259

Game information

1st Quarter

- LON – Jeff Alexander 47-yard pass from Stan Gelbaugh (Phil Alexander kick failed), 4:31
- FRA – Lew Barnes 86-yard pass from Chris Cochrane (Robbie Keen kick), 0:30

2nd Quarter

- FRA – Chris Cochrane 7-yard run (Robbie Keen kick), 11:08
- LON – Phil Alexander 27-yard field goal, 0:15

3rd Quarter

- FRA – Safety, Stan Gelbaugh tackled in end zone, 5:52
- LON – Tony Sargent 30-yard pass from Fred McNair (Phil Alexander kick), 2:16

4th Quarter

- FRA – Robbie Keen 38-yard field goal, 6:24

Passing

- LON – Stan Gelbaugh – 15/28, 181 yards, 1 TD, 2 INT
- FRA – Chris Cochrane – 13/24, 209 yards, 1 TD, 1 INT

Rushing

- LON – Jeff Alexander – 24 car, 121 yards
- FRA – Tony Baker – 20 car, 44 yards

Receiving

- LON – Sean Foster – 7 rec, 87 yards
- FRA – Lew Barnes – 2 rec, 97 yards, 1 TD
