= 1992 Birmingham Fire season =

World League of American Football team season

- Owner: Gavin Maloof
- General manager: Rick Nichols
- Head coach: Chan Gailey
- Home stadium: Legion Field

Results
- Record: 7–3–1
- Division place: 2nd North America West
- Playoffs: Lost to Orlando Thunder in semifinals

The 1992 Birmingham Fire season was the second and final season for the franchise in the World League of American Football (WLAF). The team was led by head coach Chan Gailey in his second year, and played their home games at Legion Field in Birmingham, Alabama. They finished the season with a record of seven wins, three losses and one tie (7–3–1) and with a loss against the Orlando Thunder in the WLAF semifinals as a wild card.

After a preseason loss to London, the Fire lost their opening game on the road at Sacramento. They then rebounded and went unbeaten over their next four games with wins over San Antonio, Frankfurt and Sacramento in addition to the first tie in league history against London at Wembley Stadium. Birmingham then lost in their rematch at San Antonio before they completed the regular season with four consecutive victories over Barcelona, Montreal, Orlando and Ohio to clinch the final playoff spot. In the WLAF semifinals, the Fire lost to Orlando 45–7 to finish the season with an overall record of 7–3–1.

== Offseason ==
=== Draft ===
In February 1992, the second WLAF Draft was held in Dallas, Texas. It was held over two days with rounds 1 through 14 on February 4 and rounds 15 through 29 on February 5. In addition to those players drafted, as part of their partnership with the National Football League (NFL), 101 NFL players were allocated to the WLAF. The players allocated to the Fire included: quarterbacks Shawn Moore from the Denver Broncos, and Greg Jones from the Detroit Lions; running backs Steve Avery from the Green Bay Packers and Brian Lattimore from the Indianapolis Colts; guard Joe Valerio from the Kansas City Chiefs and linebacker Kyle Freeman from the Los Angeles Raiders.

Birmingham Fire 1992 World League Draft day 1 selections
Draft order			Player name	Position	College
Round	Choice	Overall	Player name	Position	College
1	7	7	David Douglas	Tackle	Tennessee
2	6	17	Ricky Shaw	Linebacker	Oklahoma State
3	5	27	Mike Norseth	Quarterback	Kansas
4	7	40	LeAndre Anderson	Defensive end	Nebraska
5	6	50	Philip Doyle	Placekicker	Alabama
6	5	60	Ron Heard	Wide receiver	Bowling Green
7	7	73	Craig Ogletree	Linebacker	Auburn
8	6	83	Rick Apolskis	Guard	Arkansas
9	5	93	Eugene Rowell	Wide receiver	Southern Miss
10	7	106	Tim Smiley	Safety	Arkansas State
11	6	116	Fred Foggie	Cornerback	Minnesota
12	5	126	Shawn Wiggins	Wide receiver	Wyoming
13	7	139	Tony Satter	Running back	North Dakota State
14	6	149	Kirk Warner	Tight end	Georgia

Birmingham Fire 1992 World League Draft day 2 selections
Draft order			Player name	Position	College
Round	Choice	Overall	Player name	Position	College
15	5	159	Caesar Rentie	Tackle	Oklahoma
16	7	172	Simmie Carter	Cornerback	Southern Miss
17	6	182	Lamonde Russell	Wide receiver	Alabama
18	5	192	Tony DeLorenzo	Tackle	New Mexico State
19	7	205	John Wyche	Safety	Florida State
20	6	215	Eduardo Vega	Tackle	Memphis State
21	5	225	Keith Friberg	Defensive end	Syracuse
22	7	238	Reggie Stewart	Linebacker	Mississippi State
23	6	248	David Fair	Running back	Mississippi State
24	5	258	Todd Woulard	Linebacker	Alabama A&M
25	7	271	Undra Johnson	Running back	West Virginia
26	6	281	James Sherron	Guard	Southern Miss
27	5	290	Jon Reed	Wide receiver	Western Carolina
28	7	302	Byron Holdbrooks	Defensive end	Alabama
29	6	311	Philip Donald	Wide receiver	Arkansas–Pine Bluff

== Preseason ==
The 1992 preseason featured a single game for each team. The winner of the game would then serve as the number two tiebreaker, behind results in head-to-head competition, for playoff position. For their preseason game, the Fire lost 14–13 to the defending World Bowl champion London Monarchs before 10,150 fans at Legion Field. In the game, Birmingham took a 13–0 lead late into the fourth quarter. The Fire scored on a pair of 32-yard Philip Doyle field goals and on a 29-yard touchdown pass from Mike Norseth to Willie Bouyer. With just over six minutes remaining in the game, Monarchs' back-up quarterback Fred McNair led London on two touchdown drives for the win. The touchdowns were scored on McNair touchdown passes of 77-yards to Sean Foster and two-yards to Greg Harrel.

== Regular season ==
=== Schedule ===
Week	Date	Time	Opponent	Result	Record	Venue	Attendance	Source
1	March 21	7:00 p.m.	at Sacramento Surge	L 6–20	0–1	Hornet Stadium	17,920	
2	March 29	12:30 p.m.	San Antonio Riders	W 17–10	1–1	Legion Field	16,250	
3	April 5	12:30 p.m.	at Frankfurt Galaxy	W 17–7	2–1	Waldstadion	33,857	
4	April 11		at London Monarchs	T 17–17 ^{OT}	2–1–1	Wembley Stadium	20,370	
5	April 18	7:00 p.m.	Sacramento Surge	W 28–14	3–1–1	Legion Field	15,794	
6	April 25	7:00 p.m.	at San Antonio Riders	L 14–17	3–2–1	Bobcat Stadium	13,590	
7	May 2	7:00 p.m.	Barcelona Dragons	W 19–17	4–2–1	Legion Field	11,187	
8	May 10	7:00 p.m.	Montreal Machine	W 23–16	5–2–1	Legion Field	8,764	
9	May 17	12:00 p.m.	Orlando Thunder	W 24–23	6–2–1	Legion Field	15,186	
10	May 24		at Ohio Glory	W 27–24	7–2–1	Ohio Stadium	23,020	

=== Game summaries ===
==== Week 1: at Sacramento Surge ====
Team	1	2	3	4	Total
Fire	3	0	3	0	6
• Surge	0	13	7	0	20

- Date: March 21
- Location: Hornet Stadium
  Sacramento, California
- Game start: 7:00 p.m.
- Game attendance: 17,920
- Television network: USA

Scoring summary
1	Birmingham	Philip Doyle 50-yard field goal	Birmingham 3–0
2	Sacramento	Mike Pringle 2-yard run (John Nies kick failed)	Sacramento 6–3
2	Sacramento	Eddie Brown 47-yard pass from David Archer (John Nies kick)	Sacramento 13–3
3	Sacramento	Carl Parker 10-yard pass from David Archer (John Nies kick)	Sacramento 20–3
4	Birmingham	Philip Doyle 46-yard field goal	Sacramento 20–6

To open the 1992 season, the Fire were defeated by the Sacramento Surge before 17,920 fans at Hornet Stadium. After Birmingham opened the scoring with a 50-yard Philip Doyle field goal in the first quarter, Sacramento answered with a pair of second-quarter touchdowns to take a 13–3 halftime lead. The second quarter points came on a two-yard Mike Pringle run and on a 47-yard David Archer pass to Eddie Brown. The Surge extended their lead further to 20–3 early in the third on a 10-yard Archer pass to Carl Parker before Doyle scored the final points of the game with his 46-yard field goal later in the quarter. With the loss, the Fire began their season at 0–1.

==== Week 2: vs. San Antonio Riders ====
Team	1	2	3	4	Total
Riders	3	0	7	0	10
• Fire	0	17	0	0	17

- Date: March 29
- Location: Legion Field
  Birmingham, Alabama
- Game start: 12:30 p.m.
- Game attendance: 16,250
- Television network: ABC

Scoring summary
1	San Antonio	Jim Gallery 22-yard field goal	San Antonio 3–0
2	Birmingham	Eugene Rowell 7-yard run (Philip Doyle kick)	Birmingham 7–3
2	Birmingham	Philip Doyle 47-yard field goal	Birmingham 10–3
2	Birmingham	Arthur Hunter 32-yard interception return (Philip Doyle kick)	Birmingham 17–3
3	San Antonio	George Searcy 4-yard pass from Brad Goebel (Jim Gallery kick)	Birmingham 17–10

In their home opener, the Fire rebounded from their loss to Sacramento and defeated the San Antonio Riders 17–10. After the Riders took a 3–0 lead on a 22-yard Jim Gallery field goal in the first quarter, the Fire responded with 17 second quarter points that proved to be enough for the victory. In the quarter, Eugene Rowell scored on a seven-yard touchdown run, a 47-yard Philip Doyle field goal and on a 32-yard Arthur Hunter interception return. In the third quarter San Antonio scored on a four-yard Brad Goebel touchdown pass to George Searcy to make the final score 17–10. The Riders had an opportunity to tie the game in the final minute of the game, but the Goebel pass was intercepted by John Miller on the Fire six-yard line. With the victory, the Fire improved their record to 1–1.

==== Week 3: at Frankfurt Galaxy ====
Team	1	2	3	4	Total
• Fire	0	14	0	3	17
Galaxy	0	0	7	0	7

- Date: April 5
- Location: Waldstadion
  Frankfurt, Germany
- Game start: 12:30 p.m.
- Game attendance: 33,857
- Television network: ABC

Scoring summary
2	Birmingham	Elroy Harris 9-yard pass from Mike Norseth (Philip Doyle kick)	Birmingham 7–0
2	Birmingham	Elroy Harris 1-yard run (Philip Doyle kick)	Birmingham 14–0
3	Frankfurt	Tony Baker 1-yard run (Robbie Keen kick)	Birmingham 14–7
4	Birmingham	Philip Doyle 31-yard field goal	Birmingham 17–7

At the Waldstadion in Frankfurt, the Fire earned their first all-time victory in Europe with their 17–7 win over the Galaxy. After a scoreless first quarter, Birmingham took a 14–0 halftime lead with a pair of second-quarter touchdowns. Both were scored by Elroy Harris with the first on a nine-yard pass from Mike Norseth and the second on a one-yard run. The Galaxy responded in the third quarter on a one-yard Tony Baker touchdown run to cut the Fire lead to 14–7. A late Philip Doyle field goal in the fourth provided for the final points of the game in the 17–7 Birmingham victory. The 33,857 in attendance was the second largest crowd to attend a Galaxy game at Waldstadion to that point in the history of the franchise. With the victory, the Fire improved their record to 2–1.

==== Week 4: at London Monarchs ====
Team	1	2	3	4	OT	Total
Fire	7	0	0	10	0	17
Monarchs	0	10	7	0	0	17

- Date: April 11
- Location: Wembley Stadium
  London, United Kingdom
- Game attendance: 20,370

Scoring summary
1	Birmingham	Mike Norseth 2-yard run (Philip Doyle kick)	Birmingham 7–0
2	London	Charlie Young 2-yard run (Phil Alexander kick)	7–7
2	London	Phil Alexander 33-yard field goal	London 10–7
3	London	Bernard Ford 35-yard pass from Stan Gelbaugh (Phil Alexander kick)	London 17–7
4	Birmingham	Elroy Harris 1-yard run (Philip Doyle kick)	London 17–14
4	Birmingham	Philip Doyle 42-yard field goal	17–17

At Wembley Stadium in London, the Fire battled the London Monarchs to a 17–17 tie, the first tie in the history of the WLAF. Birmingham took an early 7–0 lead after Mike Norseth scored on a two-yard run before the Monarchs scored 17 consecutive points to take a 17–7 lead into the fourth quarter. London points were scored on a two-yard Charlie Young touchdown run and 33-yard Phil Alexander field goal in the second quarter and a 35-yard Stan Gelbaugh touchdown pass to Bernard Ford in the third quarter.

In the fourth quarter, the Fire cut the London lead to 17–14 after Elroy Harris scored on a one-yard touchdown run. With less than three minutes remaining in the game, Gelbaugh threw an interception that set up the game-tying, 42-yard Doyle field goal with only 0:10 remaining in regulation to send the game into overtime. In the overtime period, London failed on a pair of opportunities to win the game. The first came when Alexander missed a 39-yard field goal wide right with only 0:12 remaining, and the second when Howard Feggins intercepted a Norseth pass and returned it to the Fire three-yard where he was tackled as time expired.

The tie remained as the only one in league history through the 2006 season when Berlin and Hamburg battled to a 17–17 tie. With the tie, the Fire's record moved to 2–1–1.

==== Week 5: vs. Sacramento Surge ====
Team	1	2	3	4	Total
Surge	0	7	7	0	14
• Fire	0	6	8	14	28

- Date: April 18
- Location: Legion Field
  Birmingham, Alabama
- Game start: 7:00 p.m.
- Game attendance: 20,794
- Television network: USA

Scoring summary
2	Birmingham	Philip Doyle 38-yard field goal	Birmingham 3–0
2	Sacramento	Carl Parker 19-yard pass from David Archer (John Nies kick)	Sacramento 7–3
2	Birmingham	Philip Doyle 52-yard field goal	Sacramento 7–6
3	Birmingham	Jim Bell 10-yard pass from Mike Norseth (Two-point conversion)	Birmingham 14–7
3	Sacramento	Eddie Brown 10-yard pass from David Archer (John Nies kick)	14–14
4	Birmingham	Eddie Britton 56-yard pass from Mike Norseth (Philip Doyle kick)	Birmingham 21–14
4	Birmingham	Jim Bell 1-yard run (Philip Doyle kick)	Birmingham 28–14

In a rematch of their season opener, the Fire defeated the Sacramento Surge before 20,794 fans at Legion Field. After a scoreless first quarter, Birmingham scored a pair of Philip Doyle field goal from 38 and 52-yards and Sacramento scored on a 19-yard David Archer touchdown pass to Carl Parker for a Surge halftime lead of 7–6. In the third quarter, each team scored touchdowns to tie the game at 14–14 as they entered the fourth quarter. The Fire scored first on a ten-yard Mike Norseth pass to Jim Bell, followed by the Surge on a ten-yard Archer pass to Eddie Brown. Birmingham then closed the game with a pair of touchdowns first on a 56-yard Norseth pass to Eddie Britton and a one-yard Jim Bell run for the 28–14 win. With the victory, the Fire improved their record to 3–1–1.

==== Week 6: at San Antonio Riders ====
Team	1	2	3	4	Total
Fire	7	7	0	0	14
• Riders	0	17	0	0	17

- Date: April 25
- Location: Bobcat Stadium
  San Marcos, Texas
- Game start: 7:00 p.m.
- Game attendance: 13,590
- Television network: USA

Scoring summary
1	Birmingham	Jim Bell 1-yard run (Kirk Maggio kick)	Birmingham 7–0
2	San Antonio	Wayne Walker 23-yard pass from Mike Johnson (Jim Gallery kick failed)	Birmingham 7–6
2	San Antonio	Jim Gallery 37-yard field goal	San Antonio 9–7
2	San Antonio	Chris Oldham 22-yard interception return (Two-point conversion)	San Antonio 17–7
2	Birmingham	Tracy Sanders 84-yard fumble return (Kirk Maggio kick)	San Antonio 17–14

In a rematch of their week two matchup, the Fire lost to the San Antonio Riders before 13,590 fans at Bobcat Stadium. After Jim Bell scored on a one-yard run for the Fire in the first, the Riders responded with 17 second quarter points. Wayne Walker scored first on a 23-yard Mike Johnson touchdown pass, a 37-yard Jim Gallery field goal and on 22-yard Chris Oldham interception return. Birmingham responded late in the second with the final points of the game on an 84-yard fumble return for a touchdown by Tracy Sanders. In the second half, the Fire missed on three scoring opportunities after Elroy Harris fumbled on the Riders' three-yard line and Philip Doyle missed field goals of 35 and 45-yards. With the loss, the Fire moved their record to 3–2–1.

==== Week 7: vs. Barcelona Dragons ====
Team	1	2	3	4	Total
Dragons	0	7	0	10	17
• Fire	3	7	3	6	19

- Date: May 2
- Location: Legion Field
  Birmingham, Alabama
- Game start: 7:00 p.m.
- Game attendance: 11,187
- Television network: USA

Scoring summary
1	Birmingham	Philip Doyle 36-yard field goal	Birmingham 3–0
2	Birmingham	Tracy Sanders 70-yard interception return (Philip Doyle kick)	Birmingham 10–0
2	Barcelona	Tony Moss 16-yard pass from Scott Erney (Teddy Garcia kick)	Birmingham 10–7
3	Birmingham	Philip Doyle 20-yard field goal	Birmingham 13–7
4	Birmingham	Steve Avery 54-yard pass from Mike Norseth (Two-point conversion failed)	Birmingham 19–7
4	Barcelona	Tony Rice 3-yard run (Teddy Garcia kick)	Birmingham 19–14
4	Barcelona	Teddy Garcia 38-yard field goal	Birmingham 19–17

In a rematch of their previous season meeting in the playoffs, the Fire defeated the Barcelona Dragons at Legion Field. Birmingham took an early 3–0 lead on a 36-yard Philip Doyle field goal. In the second quarter, touchdowns were scored for the Fire by Tracy Sanders on a 70-yard interception return and for the Dragons on a 16-yard Tony Moss touchdown reception from Scott Erney for a 10–7 Birmingham lead at halftime. After a 20-yard Doyle field goal in the third, the Fire extended their lead to 19–7 in the fourth after Mike Norseth threw a 54-yard touchdown pass to Steve Avery. Although unable to take the lead, the Dragons then scored the final ten points of the game on a three-yard Tony Rice touchdown run and on a 38-yard Teddy Garcia field goal. With the victory, the Fire improved their record to 4–2–1.

==== Week 8: vs. Montreal Machine ====
Team	1	2	3	4	OT	Total
Machine	3	0	0	13	0	16
• Fire	3	7	3	3	6	22

- Date: May 10
- Location: Legion Field
  Birmingham, Alabama
- Game start: 7:00 p.m.
- Game attendance: 9,764

Scoring summary
1	Montreal	Björn Nittmo 43-yard field goal	Montreal 3–0
1	Birmingham	Philip Doyle 36-yard field goal	3–3
2	Birmingham	Mike Norseth 16-yard run (Philip Doyle kick)	Birmingham 10–3
3	Birmingham	Philip Doyle 21-yard field goal	Birmingham 13–3
4	Birmingham	Philip Doyle 23-yard field goal	Birmingham 16–3
4	Montreal	Michael Proctor 6-yard run (Björn Nittmo kick failed)	Birmingham 16–9
4	Montreal	Charlie Young 22-yard pass from Michael Proctor (Björn Nittmo kick)	16–16
OT	Birmingham	Jim Bell 1-yard run (Philip Doyle kick)	Birmingham 23–16

With just under ten seconds remaining in overtime, Jim Bell scored on a one-yard touchdown run to give the Fire a 23–16 win over the Montreal Machine at Legion Field. After field goals were scored for the Machine by Björn Nittmo from 43-yards and for the Fire by Philip Doyle from 36-yards in the first quarter, a 16-yard Mike Norseth touchdown run in the second gave Birmingham a 10–3 halftime lead. Field goals of 21 and 23-yards by Doyle extended the Fire lead to 16–3 early in the fourth before the Machine tied the game with a pair of late touchdowns. Michael Proctor scored first on a six-yard run and then threw a 22-yard touchdown pass to Charlie Young to send the game into overtime.

With less than a minute remaining in the overtime period, Montreal did not punt on a fourth-and-three on their own 43-yard line. Michael Proctor was subsequently stopped at their own 45-yard line and turned the ball over on downs to Birmingham. On the next play, Mike Norseth threw a 44-yard pass to Willie Bouyer at the one-yard line and two plays later Jim Bell scored the game-winning touchdown on a one-yard run. With the victory, the Fire improved their record to 5–2–1.

==== Week 9: vs. Orlando Thunder ====
Team	1	2	3	4	Total
Thunder	3	7	7	6	23
• Fire	7	14	0	3	24

- Date: May 17
- Location: Legion Field
  Birmingham, Alabama
- Game start: 12:00 p.m.
- Game attendance: 15,186
- Television network: ABC

Scoring summary
1	Orlando	Tracy Bennett 42-yard field goal	Orlando 3–0
1	Birmingham	Elroy Harris 7-yard run (Philip Doyle kick)	Birmingham 7–3
2	Birmingham	Jim Bell 1-yard run (Philip Doyle kick)	Birmingham 14–3
2	Birmingham	Elroy Harris 7-yard run (Philip Doyle kick)	Birmingham 21–3
2	Orlando	Darryl Clack 1-yard run (Tracy Bennett kick)	Birmingham 21–10
3	Orlando	Joe Johnson 90-punt return (Tracy Bennett kick)	Birmingham 21–17
4	Birmingham	Philip Doyle 22-yard field goal	Birmingham 24–17
4	Orlando	Grantis Bell 3-yard pass from Scott Mitchell (Two-point conversion failed)	Birmingham 24–23

In the final home game of the season, Birmingham defeated the Orlando Thunder 24–23 at Legion Field. Birmingham took a 7–3 lead at the end of the first quarter after Tracy Bennett connected on a 42-yard field goal for the Thunder and Elroy Harris scored on a seven-yard touchdown run. The Fire extended their lead to 21–10 at halftime after touchdown runs of one-yard by Jim Bell and seven-yards by Harris before the Thunder scored their first touchdown on a one-yard Darryl Clack touchdown run. After a 90-yard Joe Johnson punt return brought the score to 21–17, Birmingham scored their final points on a 22-yard Philip Doyle field goal early in the fourth. The Thunder then scored on a three-yard Scott Mitchell touchdown pass to Grantis Bell; however, instead of tying the game with an extra point, the Thunder failed on a two-point conversion and the Fire won 24–23. With the victory, the Fire improved their record to 6–2–1.

==== Week 10: at Ohio Glory ====
Team	1	2	3	4	Total
• Fire	14	3	7	3	27
Glory	10	14	0	0	24

- Date: May 24
- Location: Ohio Stadium
  Columbus, Ohio
- Game attendance: 23,020

Scoring summary
1	Ohio	Randy Bethel 8-yard pass from Greg Frey (Jerry Kauric kick)	Ohio 7–0
1	Birmingham	Elroy Harris 1-yard run (Philip Doyle kick)	7–7
1	Birmingham	Jim Bell 2-yard run (Philip Doyle kick)	Birmingham 14–7
1	Ohio	Jerry Kauric 42-yard field goal	Birmingham 14–10
2	Ohio	Phil Logan 51-yard pass from Greg Frey (Jerry Kauric kick)	Ohio 17–14
2	Birmingham	Philip Doyle 43-yard field goal	17–17
2	Ohio	Greg Frey 1-yard run (Jerry Kauric kick)	Ohio 24–17
3	Birmingham	Jim Bell 2-yard run (Philip Doyle kick)	24–24
4	Birmingham	Philip Doyle 30-yard field goal	Birmingham 27–24

In the final regular season game of the year, Birmingham defeated the Ohio Glory 27–24 at Ohio Stadium to clinch the final playoff spot as a wild card. After the first quarter, the Fire led 14–10 with Birmingham points scored on touchdown runs of one-yard by Elroy Harris and two-yards by Jim Bell and Ohio points scored on an eight-yard Greg Frey touchdown pass to Randy Bethel and a 42-yard Jerry Kauric field goals. The Glory then took a 24–17 halftime lead after a pair of Frey touchdowns, the first a 51-yard pass to Phil Logan and the second on a one-yard run. The Fire then shutout the Glory in the second half and scored on a two-yard Bell touchdown run in the third and on a 30-yard Philip Doyle field goal in the fourth to win 27–24. With the victory, the Fire improved their record to 7–2–1.

== Postseason ==
=== Schedule ===
Round	Date	Kickoff	Opponent	Result	Record	Venue	Attendance
Semifinal	May 30	7:00 p.m.	at Orlando Thunder	L 7–45	7–3–1	Florida Citrus Bowl	28,746

=== Game summary ===
==== WLAF Semifinal: at Orlando Thunder ====
Team	1	2	3	4	Total
Fire	0	0	0	7	7
• Thunder	23	9	10	3	45

- Date: May 30
- Location: Florida Citrus Bowl
  Orlando, Florida
- Game start: 7:00 p.m.
- Game attendance: 28,746
- Television network: USA

Scoring summary
1	Orlando	Mike Norseth tackled for a safety	Orlando 2–0
1	Orlando	Joe Johnson 45-yard pass from Scott Mitchell (Tracy Bennett kick)	Orlando 9–0
1	Orlando	Joe Johnson 60-yard punt return (Tracy Bennett kick)	Orlando 16–0
1	Orlando	Malcolm Frank 36-yard interception return (Tracy Bennett kick)	Orlando 23–0
2	Orlando	Willie Davis 41-yard pass from Scott Mitchell (Tracy Bennett kick failed)	Orlando 29–0
2	Orlando	Tracy Bennett 19-yard field goal	Orlando 32–0
3	Orlando	Tracy Bennett 30-yard field goal	Orlando 35–0
3	Orlando	Willie Davis 17-yard pass from Scott Mitchell (Tracy Bennett kick)	Orlando 42–0
4	Birmingham	Eddie Britton 15-yard pass from Shawn Moore (Philip Doyle kick)	Orlando 42–7
4	Orlando	Tracy Bennett 22-yard field goal	Orlando 45–7

Against the Orlando Thunder in the semifinals of the WLAF playoffs, the Fire lost 45–7 at the Florida Citrus Bowl to complete their season.

== Staff ==
1992 Birmingham Fire staff
Front office: Owner/President – Gavin Maloof; Vice president/general manager – Rick Nichols; Vice president of football operations – Chan Gailey; Player personnel coordinator – Joe Baker; Head coaches: Head coach – Chan Gailey; Offensive coaches: Running backs – Michael O'Toole; Tight ends/special teams – Joel Williams; Offensive line – Joe D'Alessandris	Defensive coaches: Defensive coordinator/linebackers – Gene Smith; Defensive line – Pete Hurt; Secondary – Stanley King; Support staff: Head athletic trainer – Mike Roberts; Equipment manager – Doug West

== Final roster ==
1992 Birmingham Fire roster
Quarterbacks: 7 Eric Jones; 12 Shawn Moore; 5 Mike Norseth; Running backs: 42 Steve Avery; 26 Jim Bell; 31 Elroy Harris; Wide receivers: 80 Willie Bouyer; 89 Eddie Britton; 83 Anthony Green; 84 Eugene Rowell; Tight ends: 87 Mark Hopkins; 88 Craig Hudson; 88 Kirk Kirkpatrick; 82 Phil Ross	Offensive linemen: 50 Bill Anderson C; 65 Rick Apolskis G; 67 Carl Bax T; 75 Tony DeLorenzo G/C; 63 Rich Schonewolf T; 74 Joe Valerio T/C; Defensive linemen: 70 Tony Bowick DE/NT; 98 Pellom McDaniels DE; 71 Otis Moore DE; 62 Darrell Phillips NT; Special teams: 3 Philip Doyle K; 8 Kirk Maggio P	Linebackers: 54 John Brantley ILB; 52 Anthony Henton OLB; 75 Junior Jackson ILB; 53 Paul McGowan ILB; 94 Craig Ogletree OLB; 59 Maurice Oliver OLB; Defensive backs: 43 Simmie Carter CB; 28 Fred Foggie CB; 29 Antonio Gibson SS; 45 James Henry CB; 21 John Holland CB; 24 Arthur Hunter SS; 44 John Miller FS; 27 Tracy Sanders CB; 48 John Wyche FS	Operation Discovery: 86 (West Germany) Andreas Motzkus WR

== Standings ==
North American West Division
Team	W	L	T	PCT	PF	PA	DIV	STK
Sacramento Surge	8	2	0	.800	250	152	2–2	W5
Birmingham Fire	7	2	1	.750	192	165	2–2	W4
San Antonio Riders	7	3	0	.700	195	150	2–2	L1

== Awards ==
After the completion of the regular season, the All-World League Team was selected by the league's ten head coaches. Overall, Birmingham had two players selected to the first team. The selections were:

- John Brantley, Linebacker, 1st Team
- John Miller, Free safety, 1st Team
