= 1992 Barcelona Dragons season =

World League of American Football team season

1992 Barcelona Dragons (NFL Europe) season
- General manager: Jack Teele
- Head coach: Jack Bicknell
- Home stadium: Estadi Olímpic de Montjuïc

Results
- Record: 5–5
- Division place: 1st European Division
- Playoffs: Lost semifinals

The 1992 Barcelona Dragons season was the second season for the franchise in the World League of American Football (WLAF). The team was led by head coach Jack Bicknell in his second year, and played its home games at Estadi Olímpic de Montjuïc in Barcelona, Spain. They finished the regular season in first place of the European Division with a record of five wins and five losses. In the WLAF semifinals, the Dragons lost to the Sacramento Surge 17–15.

== Staff ==
1992 Barcelona Dragons staff
Front office: Chief Executive Officer – Josep Maria Figueras; President – Roman Figueras; Chief Operating Officer/General Manager – Jack Teele; Director of Player Personnel – Terry McDonough; Head coaches: Head Coach – Jack Bicknell; Offensive coaches: Offensive Coordinator/Quarterbacks/Wide Receivers – Dick Curl; Offensive Line – Vince Martino	Defensive coaches: Defensive Coordinator/Linebackers – Red Kelin; Defensive Line – Steve Spagnuolo; Defensive Backs – Vaughn Williams

== Roster ==
1992 Barcelona Dragons final roster
Quarterbacks: 6 Scott Erney; 10 Mike Power; 4 Tony Rice; Running backs: 22 Tim Frager; 34 Joe Mickles; 26 Paul Palmer; Wide receivers: 82 Tyler Egerton; 80 Lionel Manuel; 87 Tony Moss; 84 Dempsey Norman; 85 Thomas Woods; Tight ends: 88 Demetrius Davis; 81 Terry O'Shea; 89 Franklin Thomas	Offensive linemen: 66 O'Neil Glenn G; 72 Ike Harris T; 71 Brad Henke T; 65 Mike Hinnant G; 70 Jeff Oliver G; 67 James Parrish T; 52 Bobby Sign C; 60 Barry Voorhees G; 79 Brett Wiese G/C; Defensive linemen: 61 Steve Alvord DE; 75 Bruce Clark DE; 92 Jerry Reese DE/NT; 62 Mike Ruth NT; 96 Brent White DE	Linebackers: 59 John El-Masry ILB; 51 Greg Gilbert ILB; 56 Ron Goetz ILB; 53 Todd Howard ILB; 90 Matt Kelley OLB; 50 Eric Lindstrom OLB; 91 Eric Naposki OLB; 55 Brad Quast ILB; 54 Darrin Trieb OLB; Defensive backs: 27 Glenn Cobb S; 25 Travis Curtis S; 29 Charles Fryar CB; 21 A. J. Greene CB; 38 John Hardy CB; 23 Adrian Jones CB; 30 Thomas King S; 28 Herb Welch S/CB; 35 Jerry Woods S; Special teams: 8 Keith English P; 3 Teddy Garcia K	Operation Discovery: 32 (Spain) Guillermo Gomez RB; 78 (England) Mark Pearce DE; Rookies in italics

== Schedule ==
Week	Date	Kickoff	Opponent	Results		Game site	Attendance	Source
Week	Date	Kickoff	Opponent	Final score	Team record	Game site	Attendance	Source
1	Saturday, March 21	6:00 p.m	Frankfurt Galaxy	L 0–17	0–1	Estadi Olímpic de Montjuïc	25,788	
2	Saturday, March 28	6:00 p.m	New York/New Jersey Knights	W 15–14	1–1	Estadi Olímpic de Montjuïc	17,870	
3	Saturday, April 4	6:00 p.m	London Monarchs	W 13–7	2–1	Estadi Olímpic de Montjuïc	19,337	
4	Saturday, April 11	7:00 p.m.	at Frankfurt Galaxy	W 20–17	3–1	Waldstadion	34,376	
5	Saturday, April 18		at London Monarchs	W 9–0	4–1	Wembley Stadium	18,518	
6	Sunday, April 26		Ohio Glory	W 20–10	5–1	Estadi Olímpic de Montjuïc	49,675	
7	Saturday, May 2	7:00 p.m.	at Birmingham Fire	L 17–19	5–2	Legion Field	11,187	
8	Sunday, May 10		San Antonio Riders	L 0–17	5–3	Estadi Olímpic de Montjuïc	41,220	
9	Saturday, May 16	8:00 p.m.	at New York/New Jersey Knights	L 0–47	5–4	Giants Stadium	22,917	
10	Saturday, May 23	1:00 p.m.	at Orlando Thunder	L 10–13	5–5	Florida Citrus Bowl	12,223	
Postseason
Semifinal	Sunday, May 31		at Sacramento Surge	L 15–17	5–6	Hornet Stadium	23,640	

== Standings ==
European Division
Team	W	L	T	PCT	PF	PA	DIV	STK
Barcelona Dragons	5	5	0	.500	104	161	3–1	L4
Frankfurt Galaxy	3	7	0	.300	150	257	3–1	W1
London Monarchs	2	7	1	.250	178	203	0–4	L1

== Game summaries ==
=== Week 1: vs Frankfurt Galaxy ===
Week One: Frankfurt Galaxy at Barcelona Dragons – Game summary

Quarter	1	2	3	4	Total
Frankfurt	0	0	3	14	17
Barcelona	0	0	0	0	0

at Estadi Olímpic de Montjuïc, Barcelona, Spain

- Date: Saturday, March 21
- Game time: 6:00 p.m.
- Game attendance: 25,788

Game information

First quarter

- No scoring.

Second quarter

- No scoring.

Third quarter

- Frankfurt – 37-yard field goal by Robbie Keen, 5:29.

Fourth quarter

- Frankfurt – Chad Fortune 38-yard touchdown reception from Mike Perez, Robbie Keen kick good, 14:50.
- Frankfurt – Fumble recovery in end zone for touchdown by Willie Wright, Robbie Keen kick good, 0:54.

Leading passers

- Frankfurt – Mike Perez – 18/31, 209 yards, 1 touchdown, 1 interception.
- Barcelona – Scott Erney – 13/29, 149 yards.

Leading rushers

- Frankfurt – Tony Baker – 19 rushes, 46 yards.
- Barcelona – Scott Erney – 3 rushes, 22 yards.

Leading receivers

- Frankfurt – Chad Fortune – 5 receptions, 87 yards, 1 touchdown.
- Barcelona – Thomas Woods – 4 receptions, 60 yards.

=== Week 2: vs New York/New Jersey Knights ===
Week Two: New York/New Jersey Knights at Barcelona Dragons – Game summary

Quarter	1	2	3	4	Total
NY/NJ	7	7	0	0	14
Barcelona	0	3	6	6	15

at Estadi Olímpic de Montjuïc, Barcelona, Spain

- Date: Saturday, March 28
- Game time: 6:00 p.m.
- Game attendance: 17,780

Game information

First quarter

- New York/New Jersey – Monty Gilbreath 12-yard touchdown reception from Reggie Slack, Kendall Trainor kick good, 9:33.

Second quarter

- Barcelona – 45-yard field goal by Teddy Garcia, 6:55.
- New York/New Jersey – Reggie Slack 10-yard touchdown run, Kendall Trainor kick good, 1:20.

Third quarter

- Barcelona – Demetrius Davis 4-yard touchdown reception from Scott Erney, two-point conversion pass failed, 3:15.

Fourth quarter

- Barcelona – Dempsey Norman 6-yard touchdown reception from Scott Erney, two-point conversion pass failed, 0:16.

Leading passers

- New York/New Jersey – Reggie Slack – 21/39, 288 yards, 1 touchdown, 1 interception.
- Barcelona – Scott Erney – 23/32, 185 yards, 2 touchdowns, 2 interceptions.

Leading rushers

- New York/New Jersey – Reggie Slack – 5 rushes, 58 yards, 1 touchdown.
- Barcelona – Paul Palmer – 16 rushes, 78 yards.

Leading receivers

- New York/New Jersey – Davis Smith – 3 receptions, 55 yards.
- Barcelona – Thomas Woods – 8 receptions, 65 yards.

=== Week 3: vs London Monarchs ===
Week Three: London Monarchs at Barcelona Dragons – Game summary

Quarter	1	2	3	4	Total
London	0	0	0	7	7
Barcelona	7	6	0	0	13

at Estadi Olímpic de Montjuïc, Barcelona, Spain

- Date: Saturday, April 4
- Game time: 6:00 p.m.
- Game attendance: 19,337

Game information

First quarter

- Barcelona – Thomas Woods 66-yard touchdown reception from Scott Erney, Teddy Garcia kick good, 9:55.

Second quarter

- Barcelona – 22-yard field goal by Teddy Garcia, 8:58.
- Barcelona – 22-yard field goal by Teddy Garcia, 0:24.

Third quarter

- No scoring.

Fourth quarter

- London – Bernard Ford 29-yard touchdown reception from Stan Gelbaugh, Phil Alexander kick good, 6:20.

Leading passers

- London – Stan Gelbaugh – 16/29, 224 yards, 1 touchdown, 2 interceptions.
- Barcelona – Scott Erney – 15/33, 181 yards, 1 touchdown, 1 interception.

Leading rushers

- London – Jeff Alexander – 12 rushes, 36 yards.
- Barcelona – Paul Palmer – 22 rushes, 62 yards.

Leading receivers

- London – Tony Sargent – 4 receptions, 80 yards.
- Barcelona – Thomas Woods – 2 receptions, 95 yards, 1 touchdown.

=== Week 4: at Frankfurt Galaxy ===
Week Four: Barcelona Dragons at Frankfurt Galaxy – Game summary

Quarter	1	2	3	4	Total
Barcelona	0	13	0	7	20
Frankfurt	17	0	0	0	17

at Waldstadion, Frankfurt, Germany

- Date: Saturday, April 11
- Game time: 7:00 p.m.
- Game attendance: 34,376

=== Week 5: at London Monarchs ===
Week Five: Barcelona Dragons at London Monarchs – Game summary

Quarter	1	2	3	4	Total
Barcelona	0	6	0	3	9
London	0	0	0	0	0

at Wembley Stadium, Wembley, England

- Date: Saturday, April 18
- Game attendance: 18,518
