= Ben Jefferson =

American football player (born 1966)

No. 62, 64, 69
- Position: Offensive lineman

Personal information
- Born: January 15, 1966 (age 60); New Rochelle, New York, U.S.
- Listed height: 6 ft 9 in (2.06 m)
- Listed weight: 335 lb (152 kg)

Career information
- High school: New Rochelle (New Rochelle, New York)
- College: Maryland (1984–1988)
- NFL draft: 1989: undrafted

Career history
- Indianapolis Colts (1989)*; Cleveland Browns (1990); Ohio Glory (1992); New England Patriots (1992)*; Los Angeles Raiders (1993)*; Las Vegas Posse (1994); Shreveport Pirates (1995)
- * Offseason or practice squad member only

Career NFL statistics
- Games played: 4
- Games started: 4
- Stats at Pro Football Reference

William Benjamin Jefferson (born January 15, 1966) is an American former professional football player who was an offensive linemen for one season with the Cleveland Browns of the National Football League (NFL). He played college football at Maryland. He also played for the Ohio Glory of the World League of American Football (WLAF), and the Las Vegas Posse and Shreveport Pirates of the Canadian Football League (CFL).

== Early life ==
William Benjamin Jefferson was born on January 15, 1966, in New Rochelle, New York. By seventh grade, he was already 6'3" and 250 pounds. Due to his size, he was not allowed to play football until eighth grade. He had previously only played basketball, where rules were made that tried to force him to shoot farther away from the hoop. He played high school football at New Rochelle High School.

== College career ==
Jefferson was a member of the Maryland Terrapins from 1984 to 1988. He redshirted in 1984. In 1985, he was featured in an edition of Sports Illustrated as one of the biggest players in college football. He was a letterman in 1985, 1987, and 1988. He missed the 1986 season due to being placed on academic probation.

== Professional career ==
Jefferson signed with the Indianapolis Colts after going undrafted in the 1989 NFL draft. He was released on September 5 and signed to the practice squad the next day. He was released again on October 19, 1989.

Jefferson was signed to the practice squad of the Cleveland Browns on November 8, 1989. He was released on January 29, 1990, but re-signed on February 27, 1990. He played in four games, all starts at guard, for the Browns during the 1990 season before being placed on injured reserve on October 22, 1990. Jefferson was released the next year on August 26, 1991.

Jefferson was a starter for the Ohio Glory of the World League of American Football (WLAF) in 1992.

He signed with the New England Patriots on July 28, 1992, before being released on September 1, 1992.

Jefferson was signed by the Los Angeles Raiders on June 10, 1993. He was waived on August 24, 1993.

He played in nine games for the Las Vegas Posse of the Canadian Football League (CFL) in 1994.

Jefferson appeared in six games for the CFL's Shreveport Pirates in 1995.
