= John Hardy (gridiron football) =

American football player (born 1968)

No. 38, 37, 28
- Position: Defensive back

Personal information
- Born: June 11, 1968 (age 58); Pasadena, California, U.S.
- Listed height: 5 ft 10 in (1.78 m)
- Listed weight: 166 lb (75 kg)

Career information
- High school: John Muir (Pasadena)
- College: California (1986–1990)
- NFL draft: 1991: undrafted

Career history
- Chicago Bears (1991); Cleveland Browns (1992)*; Ohio Glory (1992)*; Barcelona Dragons (1992); Cleveland Browns (1992)*; Ottawa Rough Riders (1993); Toronto Argonauts (1993)
- * Offseason or practice squad member only

Awards and highlights
- Second-team All-Pac-10 (1988)
- Stats at Pro Football Reference

John Louis Hardy Jr. (born June 11, 1968) is an American former professional football player who was a defensive back for one season with the Chicago Bears of the National Football League (NFL). He played college football for the California Golden Bears. He also played for the Ottawa Rough Riders and Toronto Argonauts of the Canadian Football League (CFL).

== Early life and college ==
John Louis Hardy Jr. was born on June 11, 1968, in Pasadena, California. He attended John Muir High School in Pasadena.

Hardy was a member of the California Golden Bears of the University of California, Berkeley from 1986 to 1990. He recorded four interceptions for 31 yards and one touchdown in 1987. He totaled two interceptions for 51 yards during the 1988 season, earning Coaches second-team All-Pac-10 honors. Hardy was redshirted in 1989 after having shoulder surgery. He had one interception for an 100-yard touchdown his senior year in 1990.

== Professional career ==
Hardy signed with the Chicago Bears on April 25, 1991, after going undrafted in the 1991 NFL draft. He was released on August 26 but re-signed the next day. He played in four games for the Bears during the 1991 season before being released on November 1, 1991.

Hardy was signed by the Cleveland Browns on February 20, 1992, and then allocated to the World League of American Football (WLAF) to play for the Ohio Glory. On March 18, 1992, before the start of the 1992 WLAF season, it was reported that Hardy had been released by the Browns. In May 1992, he attended rookie minicamp on a tryout basis with the Browns. Hardy signed with the Barcelona Dragons of the WLAF on May 20, 1992. He later re-signed with the Browns. However, he was released in late July 1992, with head coach Bill Belichick stating "He had a couple of pretty serious personal situations within his family and didn't feel like his heart was really in the game at this point."

Hardy signed with the Ottawa Rough Riders of the Canadian Football League (CFL) in March 1993. He played in one game for the Rough Riders during the 1993 season and posted one tackle. He also spent time on the team's practice roster. Hardy was released on September 20, 1993.

Hardy was then signed by the Toronto Argonauts of the CFL. He dressed in four games for the Argonauts in 1993, recording 15 tackles and one interception. He was released in April 1994.

== Personal life ==
Hardy's son, John Hardy-Tuliau, played collegiately for the Hawaii Rainbow Warriors and professionally for the BC Lions of the CFL.
