= Jeff Bridewell =

American football player (born 1967)

No. 6, 10
- Position: Quarterback

Personal information
- Born: May 13, 1967 (age 59); Napa, California, U.S.
- Listed height: 6 ft 4 in (1.93 m)
- Listed weight: 214 lb (97 kg)

Career information
- High school: Vintage (Napa, California)
- College: UC Davis (1987–1990)
- NFL draft: 1991: 12th round, 309th overall pick

Career history
- Phoenix Cardinals (1991)*; Green Bay Packers (1991)*; Indianapolis Colts (1992)*; Sacramento Surge (1992)*; Barcelona Dragons (1992)*; Frankfurt Galaxy (1992)*; San Francisco 49ers (1993)*
- * Offseason or practice squad member only

Jeffrey Todd Bridewell (born May 13, 1967) is an American former professional football quarterback who was selected in the 12th round of the 1991 NFL draft by the Phoenix Cardinals of the National Football League (NFL). He had brief stints with the Green Bay Packers, Indianapolis Colts, San Francisco 49ers, and with the Sacramento Surge, Barcelona Dragons, and Frankfurt Galaxy of the World League. He played college football for UC Davis.

== Early life ==
Bridewell was born in Napa, California, where he played high school football for Vintage High School.

== College career ==
Bridewell played college football for the UC Davis Aggies. In his time there he passed for 5,733 yards and 34 touchdowns. He was selected to participate in the King All-America Classic following his senior year, along with receiving an invite to the NFL Scouting Combine. He finished as the school's all-time leader in completions.

== Professional career ==
Pre-draft measurables
Height	Weight	Arm length	Hand span	40-yard dash	10-yard split	20-yard split	20-yard shuttle	Vertical jump
6 ft 3 in (1.91 m)	214 lb (97 kg)	32 in (0.81 m)	9 1/4 in (0.23 m)	5.05 s	1.77 s	2.92 s	4.58 s	27.5 in (0.70 m)
All values are from NFL Combine

=== Phoenix Cardinals ===
In 1991, Bridewell was selected by the Phoenix Cardinals in the 12th round (309th overall) of the 1991 NFL draft but did not make the final roster.

=== Green Bay Packers ===
In 1991, Bridewell signed with the Green Bay Packers' practice squad, never making it to the team's active roster.

=== Indianapolis Colts ===
In 1992, Bridewell signed with the Indianapolis Colts.

=== Sacramento Surge ===
With the Colts Bridewell was allocated to the Sacramento Surge of the World League.

=== Frankfurt Galaxy ===
Bridewell was traded to the Barcelona Dragons and then to the Frankfurt Galaxy.

=== San Francisco 49ers ===
In 1993, Bridewell signed with the San Francisco 49ers but was released. After Steve Young suffered an injury to his throwing hand he re-signed with the team. He would not play a down for the team.
