= Philip Doyle (American football) =

American football player (born 1969)

No. 17
- Position: Placekicker

Personal information
- Born: March 20, 1969 (age 57); Birmingham, Alabama, U.S.
- Listed height: 6 ft 1 in (1.85 m)
- Listed weight: 190 lb (86 kg)

Career information
- High school: Huffman (Birmingham)
- College: Alabama
- NFL draft: 1991: undrafted

Career history
- New York Giants (1991)*; Birmingham Fire (1992)
- * Offseason or practice squad member only

Awards and highlights
- Unanimous All-American (1990); Second-team All-American (1989); 2× First-team All-SEC (1989, 1990)

Philip Doyle (born March 20, 1969) is an American former football player. After a standout high school career at Huffman High School in Birmingham, Doyle played college football for the Alabama Crimson Tide from 1987 through 1989. After the 1990 season, he was recognized as a unanimous All-American. After signing briefly as an undrafted free agent with the New York Giants, Doyle played with the Birmingham Fire in 1992.

== High school ==
Doyle was the placekicker for Huffman High School in Birmingham, Alabama in the mid-1980s. As a junior in 1985, Doyle set a national high school record for field goals in a single season with 22. He broke the previous record of 19 set by Kelly Nemecek in 1983, and the 22 field goals in a single season still stands as an Alabama High School Athletic Association (AHSAA) record. Doyle ended his high school career with a total of 43 field goals which stood as an AHSAA record until 2011 when Andy Pappanastos finished his career with 48. In recognition of his career at Huffman, Doyle was named to the 1986 USA Today All-USA high school football team.

== College ==
After being recruited by Alabama, Auburn and Florida State, Doyle signed with the Crimson Tide in February 1987. At Alabama, Doyle was the starting placekicker all four years he was eligible from 1987 through the 1990 seasons. During his career with the Crimson Tide, Doyle set several team records that still stand that include his six field goal, 19 points kicking performance against Southwestern Louisiana in 1990 as single game records. He also held nearly every other team placekicking record until they were broken by Leigh Tiffin in the late 2000s. As a senior, Doyle was a unanimous selection to the 1990 College Football All-America Team.

Doyle's statistics for his University of Alabama tenure
Season	PAT	PAT Pct.	1–19	20–29	30–39	40–49	50+	FG/FGA	FG Pct.	Long	Points	Reference
1987	18/20	90%	0/0	5/5	3/3	4/7	1/5	13/20	65%		57	
1988	28/28	100%	0/0	5/6	9/11	4/8	1/5	19/31	61%	53	91	
1989	36/37	97.3%	3/3	8/8	8/8	2/4	0/1	22/25	88%		100	
1990	25/25	100%	1/1	7/8	7/7	8/10	0/1	24/29	82.76%	47	97	

== Professional career ==
=== New York Giants ===
After not being selected in the 1991 NFL draft, Doyle signed as an undrafted free agent with the New York Giants. In their first preseason game of the season against the Buffalo Bills, Doyle kicked field goals from 31 and 26 yards in the Giants' 23–10 victory. Doyle was later waived by the team on August 19, 1991.

=== Birmingham Fire ===
In spring 1992, Doyle was the placekicker for the Birmingham Fire of the World League of American Football (WLAF). Doyle was the starting placekicker for the Fire and finished the season as the league's leading scorer for a placekicker with 64 points. As the placekicker for the Fire, Doyle was kicked a 42-yard field goal with only 0:02 remaining against the London Monarchs to tie the game at 17–17. After a scoreless overtime period, the game would stand as the first and only WALF game to ever end in a tie. Doyle was also responsible for a game-winning, 30-yard field goal with 1:56 remaining in their game against the Ohio Glory. The 27–24 victory secured the Fire a wild card spot in the 1992 WALF playoffs.

Doyle's statistics for the 1992 Birmingham Fire season
Season	PAT	PAT Pct.	1–19	20–29	30–39	40–49	50+	FG/FGA	FG Pct.	Long	Points	Reference
1992	19/19	100%	0/0	4/4	5/7	4/10	2/3	15/24	62.5%	52	64	
