= Walter Wilson (gridiron football) =

American football player (born 1966)

No. 84, 85
- Positions: Tight end, wide receiver

Personal information
- Born: October 6, 1966 (age 60); Baltimore, Maryland, U.S.
- Listed height: 5 ft 10 in (1.78 m)
- Listed weight: 185 lb (84 kg)

Career information
- High school: Southern (Baltimore, Maryland)
- College: East Carolina
- NFL draft: 1990: 3rd round, 67th overall pick

Career history
- San Diego Chargers (1990); Ohio Glory (1992); Miami Dolphins (1992)*; Tampa Bay Buccaneers (1993)*; Baltimore Stallions (1994); Memphis Mad Dogs (1995)
- * Offseason or practice squad member only

Career NFL statistics
- Receptions: 10
- Receiving yards: 87
- Stats at Pro Football Reference

Walter James Wilson (born October 6, 1966) is an American former professional football player who was a wide receiver and tight end in the National Football League (NFL) who played for the San Diego Chargers. He played college football for the East Carolina Pirates. He also played in the World League of American Football (WLAF) for the Ohio Glory and in the Canadian Football League (CFL) for the Baltimore CFL Colts and Memphis Mad Dogs. He was selected by the Chargers in the third round of the 1990 NFL draft with the 67th overall pick. 1989 2nd Team All-South Independent
