= Le-Lo Lang =

American football player (born 1967)

No. 21, 28
- Position: Cornerback

Personal information
- Born: January 23, 1967 (age 59); Los Angeles, California, U.S.
- Listed height: 5 ft 11 in (1.80 m)
- Listed weight: 185 lb (84 kg)

Career information
- High school: David Starr Jordan (Los Angeles)
- College: Washington
- NFL draft: 1990: 5th round, 136th overall pick

Career history
- Denver Broncos (1990–1993); Seattle Seahawks (1994)*; Buffalo Bills (1995)*; Memphis Mad Dogs (1995)
- * Offseason or practice squad member only

Career NFL statistics
- Fumble recoveries: 1
- Sacks: 1
- Interceptions: 5
- Stats at Pro Football Reference

Le-Lo L. Lang (born January 23, 1967) is an American former professional football player who was a cornerback in the National Football League (NFL).

Born and raised in Los Angeles, California, Lang played college football for the Washington Huskies. He was selected by the Denver Broncos in the fifth round of the 1990 NFL draft (136th overall), and played four seasons for the Broncos.

After retirement, Lang served as an executive with BBVA Compass and president of the Denver Broncos Alumni Association.
