= Tony Moss =

American football player (born 1966)

No. 87, 81
- Position: Wide receiver

Personal information
- Born: June 6, 1966 (age 60); Clark Air Base, Philippines
- Listed height: 5 ft 7 in (1.70 m)
- Listed weight: 169 lb (77 kg)

Career information
- High school: Bossier (Bossier City, Louisiana)
- College: LSU (1985–1989)
- NFL draft: 1990: 4th round, 88th overall pick

Career history
- Chicago Bears (1990); Minnesota Vikings (1990)*; Tampa Bay Buccaneers (1991)*; Barcelona Dragons (1992); Shreveport Pirates (1994)
- * Offseason or practice squad member only

Awards and highlights
- 2× First-team All-SEC (1988–1989)

Anthony Ray Moss (born June 6, 1966) is an American former football wide receiver. He played college football at LSU, and was selected by the Chicago Bears in the fourth round of the 1990 NFL draft. He played professionally in the World League of American Football (WLAF) and the Canadian Football League (CFL).

== Early life ==
Anthony Ray Moss was born on June 6, 1966, at Clark Air Base in the Philippines. He played high school football at Bossier High School in Bossier City, Louisiana, rushing for over 3,000 yards during his career and earning first-team all-state honors as a senior.

== College career ==
Moss was a four-year letterman for the LSU Tigers from 1986 to 1989. He redshirted the 1985 season. He caught 18 passes for 305 yards and one touchdown through his first two seasons. Moss became a starter in 1988 after the graduation of Wendell Davis and Rogie Magee. Moss caught 55 passes for 957 yards and an SEC-leading six touchdowns in 1988, earning Associated Press honorable mention All-American and consensus first-team All-SEC honors. He also led the SEC that year with 17.4 yards per reception. As a senior in 1989, Moss had 59 receptions for 934 yards and nine touchdowns, leading the SEC in both receiving yards and receiving touchdowns. He was named consensus first-team All-SEC for the second straight season. He majored in education at LSU.

== Professional career ==
Moss was selected by the Chicago Bears in the fourth round, with the 88th overall pick, of the 1990 NFL draft. He was placed on the waived/injured list on September 3, 1990, due to a shoulder injury. He was waived by the Bears on September 19, 1990. Moss later spent the last month of the 1990 NFL season on the Minnesota Vikings' practice squad.

Moss signed with the Tampa Bay Buccaneers on April 11, 1991. He was later waived on August 12, 1991.

Moss played for the Barcelona Dragons of the World League of American Football in 1992, catching 40 passes for 421 yards and two touchdowns. He dressed in 15 games for the Shreveport Pirates of the Canadian Football League (CFL) in 1994, recording 22 receptions for 322 yards and two touchdowns and four punt returns for 55 yards. He was listed as a slotback. Moss was released by the Pirates with two weeks left in the 1994 CFL season. Pirates head coach Forrest Gregg said "Tony has worked hard for us, we have no complaints. But he has not been that productive and we felt like we needed to get some other kids in the game."
