= Anthony Thompson (linebacker) =

American football player (born 1967)

No. 53, 99
- Position: Linebacker

Personal information
- Born: June 19, 1967 (age 59); Stantonsburg, North Carolina, U.S.
- Listed height: 6 ft 1 in (1.85 m)
- Listed weight: 227 lb (103 kg)

Career information
- High school: Fike (Wilson, North Carolina)
- College: East Carolina
- NFL draft: 1990: 10th round, 275th overall pick

Career history
- Denver Broncos (1990); London Monarchs (1992)
- Stats at Pro Football Reference

Anthony Thompson (born June 19, 1967) is an American former professional football linebacker who played for the Denver Broncos of the National Football League (NFL). He played college football for the East Carolina Pirates and was selected by the Broncos in the tenth round of the 1990 NFL draft.

== Early life ==
Anthony Thompson was born on June 19, 1967, in Stantonsburg, North Carolina. He played high school football at Ralph L. Fike High School in Wilson, North Carolina. As a junior running back in 1984, he rushed 245 times for 1,658 yards. Thompson missed some time due to injury and sickness in 1985 but still managed to record 185 carries for 1,271 yards. He also played six games as a linebacker on defense in 1985. He earned all-state honors at running back for the 1985 season.

== College career ==
Thompson enrolled at East Carolina University to play college football for the Pirates as a running back. He missed the 1986 season due to failing Proposition 48. He was a four-year letterman from 1987 to 1989 on defense. He missed five games in 1987 with a bruised thigh. Thompson was a starting linebacker in 1988 and a starting defensive lineman in 1989. He had two career interceptions. As a senior in 1989, he posted 109 tackles and seven sacks.

== Professional career ==
Thompson was selected by the Broncos in the tenth round, with the 275th overall pick, of the 1990 NFL draft. He signed with the team on July 13. He was released on September 3 but re-signed the next day. Thompson was placed on injured reserve on October 11 and activated on November 20. He played in ten games overall for the Broncos during the 1990 season as a reserve linebacker. He was released on August 10, 1991, after the third of five preseason games.

Thompson played for the London Monarchs of the World League of American Football (WLAF) during the 1992 WLAF season as a linebacker, recording two sacks and one interceptions for 32 yards.
