= George Koonce =

American athlete and athletic director (born 1968)

No. 53
- Position: Linebacker

Personal information
- Born: October 15, 1968 (age 58); New Bern, North Carolina, U.S.
- Listed height: 6 ft 1 in (1.85 m)
- Listed weight: 238 lb (108 kg)

Career information
- High school: West Craven (Vanceboro, North Carolina)
- College: Chowan University; East Carolina
- NFL draft: 1991: undrafted

Career history
- Atlanta Falcons (1991)*; Ohio Glory (1992); Green Bay Packers (1992–1999); Seattle Seahawks (2000)
- * Offseason or practice squad member only

Awards and highlights
- Super Bowl champion (XXXI); Second Team All-South Independent (1990); Coastal Conference Defensive Player of the Year (1988)

Career NFL statistics
- Tackles: 651
- Sacks: 9
- Interceptions: 5
- Touchdowns: 2
- Stats at Pro Football Reference

George Earl Koonce Jr. (born October 15, 1968) is an American athlete, athletic director and collegiate fundraiser. A former linebacker in the National Football League (NFL), he served as the athletic director at the University of Wisconsin–Milwaukee between 2009 and 2010 before continuing his career in higher education.

== Early life ==
Koonce has said he faced poverty as a child, born in North Carolina. His mother made less than $10,000 per year while supporting four kids. When Koonce found this out, he recalled his mother telling him "We may be broke, but we're not broken." While still encouraging her kids to participate in sports, Koonce said his mother also ensured he fulfilled his school requirements. He has since become an advocate for education, calling education "the great equalizer." During his time in the NFL, he would take college classes during the offseason.

"One thing about football, it is day-to-day, play-by-play. You could be having the greatest season in the world, you never know when that might be the play that you get hurt," Koonce once said. "You have got to plan for those days that you are not playing - my mom and grandma always stressed that I save my money."

== Playing career ==
=== College ===
Koonce attended then-Chowan College Chowan University from 1987 to 1989. In his final year at the school, he was Coastal Conference Defensive Player of the Year and won All-American honors. Koonce then attended East Carolina University on a football scholarship.

=== Atlanta Falcons ===
Koonce was signed as an undrafted free agent by the Atlanta Falcons out of the East Carolina University, but was waived during the preseason.

=== WLAF Ohio Glory ===
Koonce started at linebacker for the World League's Ohio Glory in 1992.

=== Green Bay Packers ===
He was then signed by the Green Bay Packers before the 1992 season. He played for the Packers from 1992–1999. He was an eight-year starter as the Packers returned to dominance, starting 102 of 112 games. He played all three linebacker positions with the Packers, but injured his knee in the playoffs and – although he traveled with the team when they won Super Bowl XXXI – did not play in the big game. He was suited up for all three games in the playoffs the following season, including the Packers' loss in Super Bowl XXXII, after missing the first 12 games of the preceding regular season.

=== Seattle Seahawks ===
He was signed by the Seattle Seahawks as an unrestricted free agent before the 2000 season, and started all 16 games. After the 2000 season he retired with 720 tackles, 9 sacks, and 5 interceptions in 128 games (118 starts).

He said that, upon finding out his career was over, "it felt like part of me died ... I was completely lost."

=== NFL statistics ===
Year	Team	POS	G	GS	SK	INT	YDS	TD	LNG	FMB	FR	Yards	TKL	AST	AV
1992	GNB	LOLB	16	10	1.5	0	0	0	0	0	1	0	55	0	5
1993	GNB	LILB	15	15	3	0	0	0	0	0	1	0	108	0	8
1994	GNB	RLB	16	16	1	0	0	0	0	0	2	0	76	27	9
1995	GNB	RLB	16	16	1	1	12	0	12	0	0	0	49	25	7
1996	GNB	MLB	16	16	0	3	84	1	75	0	1	0	69	28	12
1997	GNB		4	0	0	0	0	0	0	0	0	0	5	5	0
1998	GNB	LLB	14	14	1	0	0	0	0	0	1	4	42	16	7
1999	GNB	LLB	15	15	0	0	0	0	0	0	0	0	29	21	6
2000	SEA	MLB	16	16	1.5	1	27	1	27	0	1	0	74	23	6
Total			128	118	9	5	123	2	75	0	7	4	507	145	60

|website=https://gocuhawks.com/honors/hall-of-fame/george-koonce/81

== Post-playing career ==
He was inducted into the National Junior College Hall of Fame in 2000 and also the hall of fame at East Carolina University. In 1999, he founded the George Koonce Sr. Foundation to provide underprivileged children with educational, athletic, artistic and social opportunities to support their development. Koonce's post-career ambitions have been centered around the world of academics. Earning his Master's in Sports Management from East Carolina University and Ph.D. from Marquette University (one of only two players in Packers 100-year history to earn a PhD), Koonce has affectionately become known as “The Doctor of Defense.” He is a member of the NFL Player Engagement Advisory Board and has co-authored a book entitled Is There Life After Football? – Surviving the NFL. As of April 2025, he was Senior Vice President of the Office of University Relations at Marian University in Fond du Lac, Wisconsin. Koonce serves as an on-air personality at Green Bay's CBS affiliate for Backstage with George Koonce, and Locker Room. In 2023, he was named to the board of directors for Horicon Bank.

=== East Carolina University ===
He spent of two years as an Assistant Athletic Director for Development, assisting with fundraising and marketing of the department. He also earned his master's degree in Sport Management in 2006 from ECU.

=== Green Bay Packers ===
He served in the Packers front office as the Director of Player Development for the Green Bay Packers for the 2006 season. Koonce was still on the Packers Board of Directors as of July 2025.

=== Marquette University ===
He served as the Senior Associate Director of Athletics at Marquette University in Milwaukee, Wisconsin. He was responsible for fundraising, major gifts, community relations, and student welfare. He joined the Golden Eagles in 2007. He also pursued his Ph.D. in Sport Administration while at Marquette.

=== University of Wisconsin–Milwaukee ===
He was introduced as the new University of Wisconsin–Milwaukee Director of Athletics on March 17, 2009, and began his duties on April 1. He was placed on administrative leave in April 2010, and his resignation was announced on June 2, 2010. The Milwaukee Journal Sentinel reported, "Koonce's resignation was related to the death of Koonce's wife, Tunisia, who died of cancer last October" and that "the death of Koonce's wife put (him) in the position of being the principal caretaker for his two children, ages 3 and 12."

=== Marian University ===
In 2014, Koonce was hired as the Vice-President of Advancement at Marian University in Fond du Lac, Wisconsin. The university described his job duties as "growing awareness and increasing philanthropic support" within the region.

As of 2023, Koonce had been promoted to Vice President for University Relations. He also led the Dr. George E. Koonce Scholars Program, which helps fund higher education for youth from Milwaukee.

== Personal life ==
Koonce was inducted as an honorary member of Phi Beta Sigma on July 19, 2025.
