= Ricky Shaw =

American football player (born 1965)

No. 51
- Position: Linebacker

Personal information
- Born: July 28, 1965 (age 61); Mount Vernon, New York, U.S.
- Listed height: 6 ft 4 in (1.93 m)
- Listed weight: 240 lb (109 kg)

Career information
- High school: Douglas Byrd (Fayetteville, North Carolina)
- College: Oklahoma State
- NFL draft: 1988: 4th round, 92nd overall pick

Career history
- New York Giants (1988–1989); Philadelphia Eagles (1989–1990); Kansas City Chiefs (1991)*; London Monarchs (1992); Orlando Predators (1994); San Jose SaberCats (1995–1996); Milwaukee Mustangs (1997)
- * Offseason or practice squad member only

Awards and highlights
- Second-team All-Big Eight (1987)

Career NFL statistics
- Fumble recoveries: 1
- Stats at Pro Football Reference

Ricky Andrew Shaw (born July 28, 1965) is an American former professional football player who was a linebacker in the National Football League (NFL) for the New York Giants and Philadelphia Eagles. He played college football for the Oklahoma State Cowboys and was selected 92nd overall in the fourth round of the 1988 NFL draft. He is now a physical education coach at Orange Youth Academy in Orlando, Florida. Shaw works with young men who are in a residential facility operated by Florida Department of Juvenile Justice.
