= Proposition 48 (NCAA) =

US regulation about high school grades and standardized test scores for athletes

Proposition 48 is an NCAA regulation that stipulates minimum high school grades and standardized test scores that student-athletes must meet in order to participate in college athletic competition.

The NCAA enacted Proposition 48 in 1986.

As of 2010, the regulation is as follows:

Before a high school student can be eligible to play Division I sports, he or she must meet academic requirements in high school. Those standards include:

- The successful completion of 16 core courses.
- A sliding-scale combination of grades in high school core courses and standardized-test scores. For example, if a student-athlete earns a 3.0 grade-point average in core courses, that individual must score at least 620 on the SAT or a sumscore of 52 on the ACT. As the GPA increases, the required test score decreases, and vice versa.

== New regulations ==
Beginning August 1, 2016, NCAA Division I will require 10 core courses to be completed prior to the seventh semester (seven of the 10 must be a combination of English, math or natural or physical science that meet the distribution requirements). These 10 courses become "locked in" at the start of the seventh semester and cannot be retaken for grade improvement.

Beginning August 1, 2016, Division I college-bound student-athlete may still receive athletics aid and the ability to practice with the team for failing to meet the 10 course requirement, but would not be able to compete.
