= Ronnie Haliburton =

American football player (born 1968)

No. 93, 94
- Position: Tight end

Personal information
- Born: April 14, 1968 (age 58); New Orleans, Louisiana, U.S.
- Listed height: 6 ft 4 in (1.93 m)
- Listed weight: 230 lb (104 kg)

Career information
- High school: Port Arthur (TX) Abraham Lincoln
- College: LSU
- NFL draft: 1990: 6th round, 164th overall pick

Career history
- Denver Broncos (1990–1992); Shreveport Pirates (1994)
- Stats at Pro Football Reference

Ronnie Haliburton (born April 14, 1968) is an American former professional football player who was a tight end for the Denver Broncos of the National Football League (NFL) from 1990 to 1991. He played college football for the LSU Tigers. He was selected by the Broncos in the sixth round of the 1990 NFL draft.
