= Ralph L. Fike High School =

High school in Wilson, North Carolina, United States

Location
- 500 Harrison Drive; Wilson, North Carolina 27893; United States
- Coordinates: 35°45′11″N 77°55′19″W

Information
- Type: Public
- Motto: Students First
- Established: 1958 (68 years ago)
- CEEB code: 344368
- NCES School ID: 370502001998
- Principal: Ross Renfrow
- Teaching staff: 54.43 (FTE)
- Grades: 9–12
- Enrollment: 1,023 (2023–2024)
- Student to teacher ratio: 18.79
- Colors: Blue and gold
- Athletics conference: Big East
- Team name: Demons
- Yearbook: Accolade
- Website: fike.wilsonschoolsnc.net

Ralph L. Fike High School is a high school in Wilson, North Carolina. Fike High School opened its doors to students on October 9, 1958. It is named for Dr. Ralph Llewellyn Fike (1905–1959), a physician, educator, and community leader. Fike High School is the sole International Baccalaureate school in Wilson County.

== Academic achievements ==
In 2019, Fike graduating seniors received 127 scholarships offered worth $2,326,300. Four students were also selected to attend the Governor's School of North Carolina. The school is an elite educational program for intellectually gifted high school students.

Fike's class of 2018 graduated 59 seniors with a weighted cumulative GPA of 4.0 or higher.

In 2017 Fike had two students selected to attend the North Carolina Governor's School and two selected to attend the North Carolina School of Science and Mathematics.

Fike has sent multiple students to Ivy League and other elite colleges. Two students have attended Harvard (Ian West '14 and Chibuike Uwakwe '19) and Yale (Devin Lin '20 and Riley Crysell '26).

== Athletics ==
Fike's football program is recognized as the first 4-A football program to win three consecutive North Carolina High School Athletic Association (NCHSAA) Football State Championships (1967, 1968, 1969). Fike is also the 1958 3A Co-State Champions and 3A 2002 State Runner-up. Fike's football program has earned 22 appearances in the NCHSAA playoffs.

The Fike Men's Basketball program won the NCHSAA 4A State Championship in 1984.

The Fike Women's Basketball program won the 1979 NCHSAA 4A State Championship.

Fike's Baseball program won NCHSAA state championships in 1962 (4A), 1968 (4A), and 1999 (3A). The 1968 team was led by head coach Gilbert Ferrell. The 1999 team was led by head coach Will Flowers with Brent Bissette being selected as MVP in the championship game.

Fike's wrestling program had its first state champion in 2019. Fike's wrestling program had its first state champion crowned in 2019 when Aaron Bancroft won the 160-pound title in the 3-A classification. Bancroft repeated as state champion again in 2020.

Fike's Men and Women Indoor Track teams have produced six state champions collectively.

The Fike Cross-Country program was crowned the first true county champions in 2019.

The Fike Men's golf team won the 3A Team State Championship in 2008 as well as two individual champions.

The Fike Women's Tennis program won team state championships from 1971–1972. Doubles championships were won in 1972 and 2001–2002.

== Community service ==
Fike High School has been a major contributor and supporter of Operation Backpack.

Fike annually hosts blood drives every spring. It currently reigns as having the largest one-day high school blood drive in the country.

== Notable alumni ==
- Jamareo Artis, bassist for Bruno Mars
- Izel Jenkins, former NFL defensive back
- Jamie Watson, former NBA player
