= Scott Beavers =

American football player (born 1967)

No. 64
- Position: Guard / Tackle

Personal information
- Born: February 17, 1967 (age 59); Atlanta, Georgia, U.S.
- Listed height: 6 ft 6 in (1.98 m)
- Listed weight: 315 lb (143 kg)

Career information
- High school: Campbell (Fairburn, Georgia)
- College: Georgia Tech

Career history
- Denver Broncos (1990–1991); Kansas City Chiefs (1992)*
- * Offseason or practice squad member only
- Stats at Pro Football Reference

Scott Travis Beavers (born February 17, 1967) is an American former professional football offensive lineman in the National Football League (NFL) for the Denver Broncos. He played collegiately for Georgia Tech Yellow Jackets football.
