= Ohio Glory =

World League of American Football team

Logo

General information
- Founded: 1992
- Folded: 1992
- Headquartered: Columbus, Ohio
- Colors: Blue, Red, White

League / conference affiliations
- World League of American Football (NFL Europe)

The Ohio Glory were a professional American football team in the World League of American Football, playing only in the 1992 season.

Columbus, Ohio, was awarded the WLAF franchise after the Raleigh–Durham Skyhawks posted an 0–10 season. Ohio did not do much better, and posted a 1–9 record after one season of play. The sole win came at the expense of the Frankfurt Galaxy in week 7, a 20–17 victory at Columbus.

The Glory played their home games in Ohio Stadium on The Ohio State University's campus, which at the time had a seating capacity of 91,470 (now 102,082). Their head coach was Larry Little, and they participated in the North American East division. Their first draft pick was former NFL quarterback Babe Laufenberg. Their second pick was RB/LB Jason Palmer 1991 1st team from Ohio.

== Season-by-season ==
Season	League	Regular season					Postseason			
Season	League	Won	Lost	Ties	Win %	Finish	Won	Lost	Win %	Result
1992	WLAF	1	9	0	.100	4th (North American East)	–	–	—	—
Total		1	9	0	.100		–	–	—	

== Schedule ==
Week	Date	Opponent	Result	Record	Venue	Attendance	Source
1	March 22	at Orlando Thunder	L 9–13	0–1	Florida Citrus Bowl	10,622	
2	March 29	Sacramento Surge	L 6–17	0–2	Ohio Stadium	37,837	
3	April 5	Orlando Thunder	L 3–28	0–3	Ohio Stadium	31,232	
4	April 12	at Montreal Machine	L 20–31	0–4	Olympic Stadium	28,533	
5	April 19	at San Antonio Riders	L 0–17	0–5	Bobcat Stadium	10,422	
6	April 26	at Barcelona Dragons	L 10–20	0–6	Montjuic Stadium	49,675	
7	May 2	Frankfurt Galaxy	W 20–17	1–6	Ohio Stadium	41,853	
8	May 10	New York/New Jersey Knights	L 33–39 (OT)	1–7	Ohio Stadium	20,513	
9	May 16	at Sacramento Surge	L 7–21	1–8	Hornet Stadium	21,272	
10	May 24	Birmingham Fire	L 24–27	1–9	Ohio Stadium	23,020	

== Personnel ==
=== Staff ===
1992 Ohio Glory staff
Front office: Team Owner – World League of American Football (WLAF) (league owned); Team President/General Manager – Peter Hadhazy; Rob Lachey - Equipment Manager; Jeremy Kalef - Video Director; Head coaches: Head Coach – Larry Little; Offensive coaches: Assistant Head Coach/Offensive Coordinator, & Quarterbacks/Wide Receivers – Wally English; Running Backs/Tight Ends – Joe Viadella; Offensive Line – Barry Pettyjohn	Defensive coaches: Defensive Coordinator/Secondary - Dennis Thurman; Linebackers/Special Teams – Mike Dunlevy; Defensive Line – Wally Chambers; Strength and conditioning: Bill Hickman - Head Trainer; Marv Pollins - Assistant Trainer; Christopher Kaeding, M.D. - Team Physician

=== Roster ===
1992 Ohio Glory roster
Quarterbacks: 14 Greg Frey; 11 Babe Laufenberg; 6 Pat O'Hara; Running backs: 20 Amir Rasul; 30 Adam Walker; 43 Jason Palmer; Wide receivers: 82 Patrick Jackson; 83 Phil Logan; 84 Melvin Patterson; 85 Walter Wilson; Tight ends: 88 Randy Bethel	Offensive linemen: 76 Mike Graybill T; 60 Eric Harmon G; 64 Ben Jefferson T; 78 Curt Mull G; 71 Dustin Quinton T; 53 Ken Vines C/G; 51 Curtis Wilson C; Defensive linemen: 75 Anthony Butts DT; 95 Joel Dickson DE; 98 Charles Jackson DT; 77 Chad Rolen DE; 70 Mike Sunvold DE; 73 Kent Wells DT	Linebackers: 90 Marlon Brown OLB; 56 Stacey Harvey OLB; 53 George Koonce OLB; 50 Jono Tunney MLB; Defensive backs: 31 Michael Adams CB; 26 Tim James S; 33 Aaron Ruffin CB; 23 Darren Willis S; Special teams: 7 Jerry Kauric K; 5 Tom Rouen P	Operation Discovery: Vacant; Rookies in italics
