= Tony Baker (running back, born 1964) =

American football player

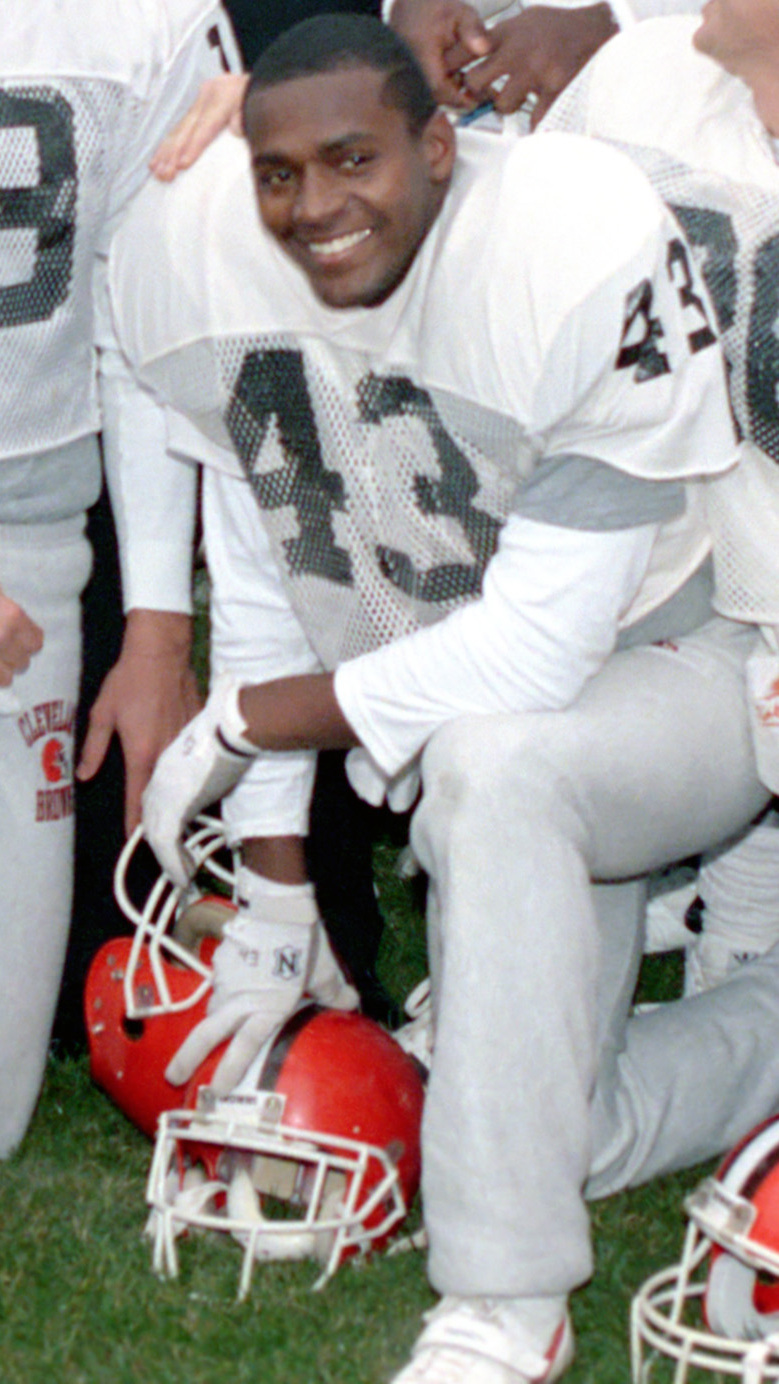
- Baker with the Cleveland Browns in 1988

No. 33, 43, 41, 44
- Position: Running back

Personal information
- Born: June 11, 1964 (age 62); High Point, North Carolina, U.S.
- Listed height: 5 ft 10 in (1.78 m)
- Listed weight: 182 lb (83 kg)

Career information
- High school: T. Wingate Andrews (High Point)
- College: East Carolina
- NFL draft: 1986: 10th round, 252nd overall pick

Career history
- Atlanta Falcons (1986); Cleveland Browns (1986–1988); Phoenix Cardinals (1989); Frankfurt Galaxy (1991–1992)

Awards and highlights
- All-World League (1991); First Team All-South Independent (1985)

Career NFL statistics
- Rushing yards: 53
- Rushing average: 2.2
- Receptions: 2
- Receiving yards: 18
- Stats at Pro Football Reference

Tony Ferrino Baker (born June 11, 1964) is an American former professional football player who was a running back in the National Football League (NFL). He was selected by the Atlanta Falcons in the tenth round of the 1986 NFL draft. He played college football for the East Carolina Pirates.

Baker also played for the Cleveland Browns, Phoenix Cardinals and Frankfurt Galaxy.
