= Scott Erney =

American football player (born 1966)

No. 6
- Position: Quarterback

Personal information
- Born: December 12, 1966 (age 59); Camp Hill, Pennsylvania, U.S.
- Listed height: 6 ft 1 in (1.85 m)
- Listed weight: 200 lb (91 kg)

Career information
- High school: Mechanicsburg (Mechanicsburg, Pennsylvania)
- College: Rutgers (1985–1989)
- NFL draft: 1990: undrafted

Career history
- Denver Broncos (1990)*; Barcelona Dragons (1991–1992)
- * Offseason or practice squad member only

Awards and highlights
- Second-team All-WLAF (1991); Second-team All-East (1988)

Scott Erney (born December 12, 1966) is an American former football quarterback. He played college football for the Rutgers Scarlet Knights and professionally for the Barcelona Dragons of the World League of American Football (WLAF).

== Early life ==
Scott Erney was born on December 12, 1966, in Camp Hill, Pennsylvania. He attended Mechanicsburg High School in Mechanicsburg, Pennsylvania.

== College career ==
Erney played college football for the Rutgers Scarlet Knights of Rutgers University. He redshirted the 1985 season and was a four-year letterman from 1986 to 1989. He began the 1986 season as the backup to Joe Gagliardi but became the starter in October after Gagliardi suffered a season-ending injury. Erney remained the starter for Rutgers from 1987 to 1989. He threw for a school-record 436 yards against Vanderbilt in 1988. He was named an Associated Press (AP) honorable mention All-American and an AP second-team All-East selection for the 1988 season. Erney recorded college career totals of 614 completions on 1,128 passing attempts (54.4%) for 7,188 yards, 41 touchdowns, and 49 interceptions while also rushing for 120 yards and six touchdowns. He finished his college career as the school's all-time leader in every major passing category. He was inducted into the Rutgers Athletics Hall of Fame in 1995.

== Professional career ==
=== Denver Broncos ===
Erney signed with the Denver Broncos after going undrafted in the 1990 NFL draft. He was released before the start of the 1990 regular season.

=== Barcelona Dragons ===
On February 18, 1991, Erney was the fifth quarterback taken in the inaugural 1991 WLAF quarterbacks draft. He started seven of ten regular season games for the Barcelona Dragons during the 1991 WLAF season. He missed three games with a dislocated shoulder. Emery finished the 1991 season completing 79 of 158 passes (50.0%) for 1,186 yards, eight touchdowns, and two interceptions while running 18 times for 58 yards and one touchdown. The Dragons went 8–2 and advanced to the first-ever World Bowl (World Bowl '91). Emery threw three interceptions in the first half before leaving the game with a leg injury. Tony Rice played the second half as the Dragons lost to the London Monarchs by a score of 21–0. Erney had three surgeries in five days to repair a damaged nerve and torn muscle in his right leg. He earned second-team All-WLAF honors for his performance during the 1991 season.

Erney returned as the Dragons' starter in 1992, completing 168 of 315 passes (53.3%) for 1,654 yards, six touchdowns, and ten interceptions while rushing 25 times for 106 yards and one touchdown. Barcelona finished the 1992 season with a 5–5 record and lost their playoff game to the Sacramento Surge 17–15. Erney had a tryout with the New York Jets in July 1992 but was not signed.
