= 1992 WLAF season =

- Duration: March 21, 1992 – May 24, 1992

World Bowl '92
- Date: June 6, 1992
- Venue: Olympic Stadium, Montreal, Quebec, Canada

WLAF seasons seasons
- 1991 1995

The 1992 WLAF season was the second season of the World League of American Football (WLAF). The regular season began on March 21, and concluded on May 24. The postseason ran from May 30 until June 6, when the Sacramento Surge defeated the Orlando Thunder 21–17 in World Bowl '92 at Olympic Stadium in Montreal, Quebec, Canada.

== Regular season ==
=== Week 1 ===
Date	Visiting team	Final score	Home team	Source
Saturday, March 21	Frankfurt Galaxy	17–0	Barcelona Dragons	
Saturday, March 21	Birmingham Fire	6–20	Sacramento Surge	
Sunday, March 22	Ohio Glory	9–13	Orlando Thunder	
Sunday, March 22	New York/New Jersey Knights	20–26 *	London Monarchs	
Sunday, March 22	Montreal Machine	16–17	San Antonio Riders	

=== Week 2 ===
Date	Visiting team	Final score	Home team	Source
Saturday, March 28	New York/New Jersey Knights	14–15	Barcelona Dragons	
Saturday, March 28	Frankfurt Galaxy	31–28	London Monarchs	
Saturday, March 28	Orlando Thunder	29–31	Montreal Machine	
Sunday, March 29	San Antonio Riders	10–17	Birmingham Fire	
Sunday, March 29	Sacramento Surge	17–6	Ohio Glory	

=== Week 3 ===
Date	Visiting team	Final score	Home team	Source
Saturday, April 4	London Monarchs	7–13	Barcelona Dragons	
Saturday, April 4	Montreal Machine	7–14	Sacramento Surge	
Saturday, April 4	San Antonio Riders	9–3	New York/New Jersey Knights	
Sunday, April 5	Birmingham Fire	17–7	Frankfurt Galaxy	
Sunday, April 5	Orlando Thunder	28–3	Ohio Glory	

=== Week 4 ===
Date	Visiting team	Final score	Home team	Source
Saturday, April 11	Barcelona Dragons	20–17	Frankfurt Galaxy	
Saturday, April 11	Birmingham Fire	17–17 *	London Monarchs	
Saturday, April 11	San Antonio Riders	23–20 *	Sacramento Surge	
Sunday, April 12	New York/New Jersey Knights	21–39	Orlando Thunder	
Sunday, April 12	Ohio Glory	20–31	Montreal Machine	

=== Week 5 ===
Date	Visiting team	Final score	Home team	Source
Saturday, April 18	Barcelona Dragons	9–0	London Monarchs	
Saturday, April 18	Sacramento Surge	14–28	Birmingham Fire	
Saturday, April 18	Frankfurt Galaxy	21–24	New York/New Jersey Knights	
Sunday, April 19	Ohio Glory	0–17	San Antonio Riders	
Sunday, April 19	Montreal Machine	8–16	Orlando Thunder	

=== Week 6 ===
Date	Visiting team	Final score	Home team	Source
Saturday, April 25	Orlando Thunder	38–0	Frankfurt Galaxy	
Saturday, April 25	Birmingham Fire	14–17	San Antonio Riders	
Sunday, April 26	Ohio Glory	10–20	Barcelona Dragons	
Sunday, April 26	Sacramento Surge	31–26	London Monarchs	
Sunday, April 26	New York/New Jersey Knights	34–11	Montreal Machine	

=== Week 7 ===
Date	Visiting team	Final score	Home team	Source
Saturday, May 2	Barcelona Dragons	17–19	Birmingham Fire	
Saturday, May 2	Frankfurt Galaxy	17–20	Ohio Glory	
Sunday, May 3	Orlando Thunder	39–21	San Antonio Riders	
Sunday, May 3	London Monarchs	13–41	New York/New Jersey Knights	
Sunday, May 3	Sacramento Surge	35–21	Montreal Machine	

=== Week 8 ===
Date	Visiting team	Final score	Home team	Source
Saturday, May 9	Frankfurt Galaxy	7–51	Sacramento Surge	
Saturday, May 9	London Monarchs	0–9	Orlando Thunder	
Sunday, May 10	New York/New Jersey Knights	39–33 *	Ohio Glory	
Sunday, May 10	San Antonio Riders	17–0	Barcelona Dragons	
Sunday, May 10	Montreal Machine	16–23 *	Birmingham Fire	

=== Week 9 ===
Date	Visiting team	Final score	Home team	Source
Saturday, May 16	Ohio Glory	7–21	Sacramento Surge	
Saturday, May 16	Barcelona Dragons	0–47	New York/New Jersey Knights	
Sunday, May 17	Orlando Thunder	23–24	Birmingham Fire	
Sunday, May 17	London Monarchs	45–13	Montreal Machine	
Sunday, May 17	San Antonio Riders	43–14	Frankfurt Galaxy	

=== Week 10 ===
Date	Visiting team	Final score	Home team	Source
Saturday, May 23	London Monarchs	16–19	Frankfurt Galaxy	
Saturday, May 23	Montreal Machine	21–41	New York/New Jersey Knights	
Saturday, May 23	Barcelona Dragons	10–13	Orlando Thunder	
Saturday, May 23	Sacramento Surge	27–21	San Antonio Riders	
Sunday, May 24	Birmingham Fire	27–24	Ohio Glory	

== Standings ==
European Division
Team	W	L	T	PCT	PF	PA	DIV	STK
Barcelona Dragons	5	5	0	.500	104	161	3–1	L4
Frankfurt Galaxy	3	7	0	.300	150	257	3–1	W1
London Monarchs	2	7	1	.250	178	203	0–4	L1

North American East Division
Team	W	L	T	PCT	PF	PA	DIV	STK
Orlando Thunder	8	2	0	.800	247	127	4–1	W1
New York/New Jersey Knights	6	4	0	.600	284	188	3–1	W6
Montreal Machine	2	8	0	.200	175	274	2–3	L6
Ohio Glory	1	9	0	.100	132	230	0–4	L3

North American West Division
Team	W	L	T	PCT	PF	PA	DIV	STK
Sacramento Surge	8	2	0	.800	250	152	2–2	W5
Birmingham Fire	7	2	1	.750	192	165	2–2	W4
San Antonio Riders	7	3	0	.700	195	150	2–2	L1

== Postseason ==
Semifinals
1	Orlando Thunder	45
4	Birmingham Fire	7
3	Barcelona Dragons	15
2	Sacramento Surge	17

World Bowl '92
Sacramento Surge	21
Orlando Thunder	17
