= 1991 Birmingham Fire season =

World League of American Football team season

- Owner: Gavin Maloof
- General manager: Michael Huyghue
- Head coach: Chan Gailey
- Home stadium: Legion Field

Results
- Record: 5–6
- Division place: 1st North America West
- Playoffs: Lost to Barcelona Dragons in semifinals

The 1991 Birmingham Fire season was the first for the franchise in the inaugural season for the World League of American Football (WLAF). The team was led by head coach Chan Gailey, and played their home games at Legion Field in Birmingham, Alabama. They finished the season with an overall record of five wins and six losses (5–6), as the North America West division champions and with a loss against the Barcelona Dragons in the WLAF semifinals.

The Fire franchise was established in April 1990, and by November 1990 league officials announced play to begin in March 1991. With former Denver Broncos offensive coordinator Chan Gailey selected as head coach, the league held its inaugural draft in February 1991. Birmingham opened the season with a home loss to Montreal followed by a win over Sacramento. The Fire then alternated pairs of wins and losses for the remainder of the season in which the three European team dominated. Although they finished with a record of only 5–5, the Fire qualified for the playoffs as the better of the two mediocre North America division champions, having beaten the 5-5 Knights who had to face the mighty 9-1 London Monarchs. In their WLAF semifinal, Birmingham lost 10–3 to wild card winner Barcelona Dragons; their 8–2 record was only good enough for 2nd in Europe behind London even after having beaten the Monarchs at Wembley.

== Offseason ==
On April 18, 1990, Birmingham became the second U.S. city that was awarded a franchise after the Orlando Thunder to compete in the inaugural WLAF season. At the time of the announcement, league president Tex Schramm said that past support for professional football in Birmingham was a major reason for its selection for a franchise. In November, officials announced the league would begin play in March 1991 with ten teams. At that time it was also revealed that Birmingham would compete as a member of the North American West division with the Sacramento Surge and the San Antonio Riders. On December 21, 1990, Chan Gailey was introduced as the first head coach of the Fire.

=== Draft ===
In February 1991, the first WLAF Draft was held in Orlando, Florida. Unlike the NFL draft, the WLAF version was carried out with individual positions being drafted over a period of several days. Offensive linemen were drafted on February 14; running backs, punters and placekickers on February 16; quarterbacks, wide receivers and tight ends on February 18; defensive linemen on February 20; linebackers on February 22; and defensive backs on February 24. In addition to those players drafted, each team had four European-born players assigned to their squad in a program called Operation Discovery. Players assigned through this program to the Fire were Pepe Moscatelli and Sergio Vissa from Italy and Andreas Motzkus and Hans-Ulrich Riecke from Germany.

Offensive linemen
Position	Selection	Player	College
Offensive linemen	2	Bill Anderson	Iowa
Offensive linemen	19	R. C. Mullin	Southwestern Louisiana
Offensive linemen	22	Jason Kuipers	Florida State
Offensive linemen	39	Buddy King	Southern Miss
Offensive linemen	42	Michael Pavik	Virginia Tech
Offensive linemen	59	Paul Yniguez	Kansas State
Offensive linemen	62	Charles Odorne	Texas Tech
Offensive linemen	79	Rich Schonewolf	Penn State
Offensive linemen	82	Michael Tanks	Florida State
Offensive linemen	99	Bill Doyen	West Virginia Tech
Offensive linemen	102	Stu Milberg	Connecticut

Running backs, placekickers and punters
Position	Selection	Player	College
Running backs	9	Joe Henderson	Iowa State
Running backs	12	David Clark	Dartmouth
Running backs	29	Steve Avery	Northern Michigan
Running backs	32	Harvey Reed	Howard
Running backs	49	Charles Sanders	Slippery Rock
Running backs	52	Byron Sanders	Northwestern State
Placekickers	4	Win Lyle	Auburn
Placekickers	17	James Campbell	Eastern Kentucky
Punters	7	Kent Elmore	Chattanooga
Punters	14	Kirk Maggio	UCLA

Quarterbacks, wide receivers and tight ends
Position	Selection	Player	College
Quarterbacks	1	Brent Pease	Montana
Quarterbacks	20	Joe Pizzo	Mars Hill
Quarterbacks	21	Eric Jones	Vanderbilt
Quarterbacks	40	Gene Benhart	Western Illinois
Tight ends	10	Phil Ross	Oregon State
Tight ends	11	Mark Hopkins	Central Michigan
Tight ends	30	Curt Jones	Utah
Wide receivers	8	Willie Bouyer	Michigan State
Wide receivers	13	Gary Cooper	Clemson
Wide receivers	28	William MacKall	Tennessee–Martin
Wide receivers	33	Tyrone Watson	Tennessee State
Wide receivers	48	Melvin Patterson	Stephen F. Austin
Wide receivers	53	Harry Mehre	William & Mary
Wide receivers	68	Gerald Mitchell	Vanderbilt
Wide receivers	73	Dale Amos	Franklin & Marshall

Defensive linemen
Position	Selection	Player	College
Defensive linemen	5	Darrell Phillips	LSU
Defensive linemen	16	Tony Bowick	Chattanooga
Defensive linemen	25	Otis Moore	Clemson
Defensive linemen	36	Arthur Walker	Colorado
Defensive linemen	45	Pellom McDaniels	Oregon State
Defensive linemen	56	Okland Salave'a	Colorado
Defensive linemen	65	Chris Parker	West Virginia
Defensive linemen	76	Flint Fleming	North Dakota State
Defensive linemen	85	Ted Hennings	Northern Illinois

Linebackers
Position	Selection	Player	College
Linebackers	6	Paul McGowan	Florida State
Linebackers	15	John Brantley	Georgia
Linebackers	26	Maurice Oliver	Southern Miss
Linebackers	35	Steve Hyche	Livingston
Linebackers	46	Steve Thompson	UC Davis
Linebackers	55	Chad Thorson	Wheaton
Linebackers	66	James DuBose	Wake Forest
Linebackers	75	Randy Cockrell	Virginia Tech

Defensive backs
Position	Selection	Player	College
Defensive backs	3	Anthony Newsom	Stephen F. Austin
Defensive backs	18	Tracy Sanders	Florida State
Defensive backs	23	Alex Armenteros	Bethune-Cookman
Defensive backs	38	John Holland	Sacramento State
Defensive backs	43	John Miller	Michigan State
Defensive backs	58	Patrick Williams	Arkansas
Defensive backs	63	Derrick Richey	Texas A&M
Defensive backs	78	James Henry	Southern Miss
Defensive backs	83	Mark Fogle	Angelo State
Defensive backs	98	Arthur Hunter	Central State
Defensive backs	103	Kevin Dent	Jackson State
Defensive backs	118	Albert Burks	Kentucky

== Regular season ==
=== Schedule ===
Week	Time	Date	Opponent	Result	Record	Venue	Attendance	Source
1	March 23	7:00 p.m.	Montreal Machine	L 5–20	0–1	Legion Field	52,942	
2	March 30	7:00 p.m.	Sacramento Surge	W 17–10	1–1	Legion Field	16,500	
3	April 8	7:00 p.m.	at Montreal Machine	L 10–23	1–2	Olympic Stadium	27,766	
4	April 15	7:00 p.m.	London Monarchs	L 0–27	1–3	Legion Field	18,500	
5	April 21	12:00 p.m.	at Orlando Thunder	W 31–6	2–3	Florida Citrus Bowl	21,249	
6	April 29	7:00 p.m.	San Antonio Riders	W 16–12	3–3	Legion Field	8,114	
7	May 4	1:00 p.m.	at Barcelona Dragons	L 6–11	3–4	Montjuic Stadium	31,490	
8	May 12	12:00 p.m.	at Frankfurt Galaxy	L 3–10	3–5	Waldstadion	28,127	
9	May 20	7:00 p.m.	New York/New Jersey Knights	W 24–14	4–5	Legion Field	31,500	
10	May 25	2:00 p.m.	at Raleigh–Durham Skyhawks	W 28–7	5–5	Carter–Finley Stadium	16,335	

=== Game summaries ===
==== Week 1: vs. Montreal Machine ====
Team	1	2	3	4	Total
• Machine	3	7	3	7	20
Fire	0	0	0	5	5

- Date: March 23
- Location: Legion Field
  Birmingham, Alabama
- Game start: 7:00 p.m.
- Game attendance: 52,942
- Television network: USA

Scoring summary
1	Montreal	Björn Nittmo 22-yard field goal	Montreal 3–0
2	Montreal	Keith Jennings 2-yard pass from Kevin Sweeney (Björn Nittmo kick)	Montreal 10–0
3	Montreal	Björn Nittmo 36-yard field goal	Montreal 13–0
4	Birmingham	Win Lyle 35-yard field goal	Montreal 13–3
4	Birmingham	Kevin Sweeney called for intentional grounding in the end zone for a safety	Montreal 13–5
4	Montreal	Elroy Harris 1-yard run (Björn Nittmo kick)	Montreal 20–5

In what was their first all-time game, the Fire were defeated by the Montreal Machine before 52,942 fans at Legion Field. Late in the first quarter, Birmingham's James Henry fumbled a punt that Montreal recovered at the 11-yard line of the Fire. Four plays later, the Machine took an early 3–0 lead after Björn Nittmo connected on a 22-yard field goal. Just as their first scoring drive started with a Birmingham special teams mistake, their second did as well. In the second quarter, a bad snap that went over the head of Fire punter Kirk Maggio gave the Machine possession at the Birmingham 17-yard line. Keith Jennings then scored the first touchdown of the game on a two-yard pass from Kevin Sweeney to give Montreal a 10–0 halftime lead. The Machine extended their lead to 13–0 after a 36-yard Nittmo field goal in the third before the Fire scored their first points in the fourth quarter. In the fourth, Birmingham scored first on a 35-yard field goal by Win Lyle and then were later awarded a safety after Montreal's Kevin Sweeney called for intentional grounding in the end zone to cut the lead to 13–5. However, Elroy Harris scored on a one-yard touchdown run with only 1:42 left in the game to seal the 20–5 Montreal victory.

In the loss, the Birmingham defense only allowed 179 yards of total offense, with only 33 yards coming through the air. On offense, the Fire gained 231 yards of total offense, with only 79 yards coming on the ground. Due to the larger than expected crowd, the start of the game was delayed 21 minutes to allow fans into the stadium as only two gates were open at Legion Field. With the loss, the Fire began their season at 0–1.

==== Week 2: vs. Sacramento Surge ====
Team	1	2	3	4	Total
Surge	0	10	0	0	10
• Fire	0	10	7	0	17

- Date: March 30
- Location: Legion Field
  Birmingham, Alabama
- Game start: 7:00 p.m.
- Game attendance: 16,432
- Television network: USA

Scoring summary
2	Birmingham	Win Lyle 35-yard field goal	Birmingham 3–0
2	Birmingham	Joe Henderson 35-yard run (Win Lyle kick)	Birmingham 10–0
2	Sacramento	Sam Archer 20-yard pass from Mike Elkins (Kendall Trainor kick)	Birmingham 10–7
2	Sacramento	Kendall Trainor 25-yard field goal	10–10
3	Birmingham	John Miller 99-yard interception return (Win Lyle kick)	Birmingham 17–10

Against the Sacramento Surge, the Fire recorded their first all-time victory with their 17–10 win in near freezing conditions before 16,432 fans at Legion Field. After a scoreless first quarter, the Fire took a 10–0 lead in the second only to have the Surge tie the game 10–10 at halftime. Birmingham scored on a 35-yard Win Lyle field goal and a 35-yard Joe Henderson touchdown run; Sacramento scored on a 20-yard Mike Elkins touchdown pass to Sam Archer and on a 25-yard Kendall Trainor field goal. Birmingham then scored the game-winning touchdown in the third quarter when John Miller intercepted an Elkins pass and returned it 99-yards for a touchdown and a 17–10 Fire lead. Sacramento did have a chance late in the fourth quarter to tie up the game. With a first-and-goal from the Fire two-yard line, Elkins threw four incomplete passes to turn the ball over on downs with 1:13 left in the game. With the win, the Fire evened their season record at 1–1.

==== Week 3: at Montreal Machine ====
Team	1	2	3	4	Total
Fire	0	10	0	0	10
• Machine	13	3	7	0	23

- Date: April 8
- Location: Olympic Stadium
  Montreal, Quebec
- Game start: 7:00 p.m.
- Game attendance: 27,766
- Television network: USA

Scoring summary
1	Montreal	Richard Shelton 26-yard fumble return (Björn Nittmo kick)	Montreal 7–0
1	Montreal	Richard Shelton 63-yard interception return (Björn Nittmo kick failed)	Montreal 13–0
2	Birmingham	Stacey Mobley 55-yard pass from Brent Pease (Win Lyle kick)	Montreal 13–7
2	Birmingham	Win Lyle 20-yard field goal	Montreal 13–10
2	Montreal	Björn Nittmo 39-yard field goal	Montreal 16–10
3	Montreal	Elroy Harris 41-yard run (Björn Nittmo kick)	Montreal 23–10

In what was their first all-time road game the Fire were defeated by the 23–10 Montreal Machine, for the second time in three weeks, before 27,766 fans at Olympic Stadium in Montreal on a Monday night. The Machine took a 13–0 lead early in the first quarter after Richard Shelton scored a pair of defensive touchdowns. The first came on the first offensive play of the game when Shelton recovered a Joe Henderson fumble caused by Adam Bob and returned it 26-yards for a 7–0 lead. About five minutes later, Shelton intercepted a Brent Pease pass and returned it for a touchdown and a 13–0 lead after Björn Nittmo missed the extra point.

Birmingham responded in the second quarter with a 55-yard Pease touchdown pass to Stacey Mobley and a 20-yard Win Lyle field goal to cut the Montreal lead to 13–10. The Machine then scored late on a 39-yard Nittmo field goal to make the halftime score 16–10 in favor of the home team. A 41-yard Elroy Harris touchdown run late in the third was the final points of the game scored in the 23–10 Machine victory. In the game Birmingham outgained Montreal 181 to 39 in passing yardage and Montreal outgained Birmingham 154 to 73 in rushing yardage. With the loss, the Fire dropped to 1–2.

==== Week 4: vs. London Monarchs ====
Team	1	2	3	4	Total
• Monarchs	7	3	0	17	27
Fire	0	0	0	0	0

- Date: April 15
- Location: Legion Field
  Birmingham, Alabama
- Game start: 7:00 p.m.
- Game attendance: 18,512
- Television network: USA

Scoring summary
1	London	David Smith 6-yard run (Phil Alexander kick)	London 7–0
2	London	Phil Alexander 27-yard field goal	London 10–0
4	London	Andre Riley 33-yard pass from Stan Gelbaugh (Phil Alexander kick)	London 17–0
4	London	Andre Riley 13-yard pass from Stan Gelbaugh (Phil Alexander kick)	London 24–0
4	London	Phil Alexander 27-yard field goal	London 27–0

Against the London Monarchs, the Fire were outgained in total offense 404 to 112 yards and were shut out 27–0 at Legion Field. The Monarchs took a 10–0 lead into halftime after David Smith scored on a six-yard touchdown run in the first and Phil Alexander connected on a 27-yard field goal in the second quarter. The Fire defense then shut out London in the third quarter, but 17 unanswered points in the fourth quarter secured the Monarchs' victory. In a span of 2:43, London quarterback Stan Gelbaugh threw touchdown passes of 33 and 13-yards to Andre Riley in the fourth quarter. Alexander then scored the final points of the game with his second 27-yard field goal of the game.

In the fourth quarter, Birmingham starting quarterback Brent Pease was replaced with back-up Eric Jones. Pease finished the game having completed 10-of-27 passes for 65 yards and Jones finished having completed 4-of-9 passes for 35 yards. With the loss, the Fire dropped to 1–3.

==== Week 5: at Orlando Thunder ====
Team	1	2	3	4	Total
• Fire	9	15	7	0	31
Thunder	0	0	6	0	6

- Date: April 21
- Location: Florida Citrus Bowl
  Orlando, Florida
- Game start: 12:00 p.m.
- Game attendance: 21,249
- Television network: ABC

Scoring summary
1	Birmingham	Myron Jones tackled by Darrell Phillips for a safety	Birmingham 2–0
1	Birmingham	Brent Pease 15-yard pass from Stacey Mobley (Win Lyle kick)	Birmingham 9–0
2	Birmingham	Willie Bouyer 21-yard pass from Brent Pease (Win Lyle kick)	Birmingham 16–0
2	Birmingham	James Henry 77-yard interception return (Kirk Maggio two-point conversion)	Birmingham 24–0
3	Birmingham	Willie Bouyer 87-yard pass from Brent Pease (Win Lyle kick)	Birmingham 31–0
3	Orlando	Myron Jones 4-yard run (Charlie Baumann kick failed)	Birmingham 31–6

In their second road game of the season, the Fire defeated the Orlando Thunder 31–6 at the Florida Citrus Bowl. J. J. Flannigan fumbled the opening kickoff for Orlando, which was recovered by Arthur Hunter for the Fire at the Thunder 13-yard line. The Orlando defense managed to hold the Fire after a goal line stand gave possession back to the Thunder at the Birmingham two-yard line. Three plays later, Myron Jones was tackled by Darrell Phillips for a safety and a 2–0 Birmingham lead. On the drive that ensued, the Fire scored their first touchdown of the game after Stacey Mobley threw a 15-yard touchdown pass to Brent Pease on a trick play for a 9–0 lead. Birmingham then extended their lead to 24–0 at halftime with a pair of second-quarter touchdowns. The first came on a 21-yard Pease pass to Willie Bouyer and the second when James Henry intercepted a Kerwin Bell pass and returned it 77-yards for a touchdown.

Early in the third quarter, Steve Williams had an apparent interception return for a touchdown negated by a false start penalty. On the next play, Pease threw an 87-yard touchdown pass to Willie Bouyer to give Birmingham a 31–0 lead. Orlando later scored their only points of the game late in the fourth quarter on a four-yard Myron Jones touchdown run. In the game, the Thunder had six turnovers as compared to zero for the Fire. The victory improved the Fire's record to 2–3.

==== Week 6: vs. San Antonio Riders ====
Team	1	2	3	4	Total
Riders	0	0	0	12	12
• Fire	0	16	0	0	16

- Date: April 29
- Location: Legion Field
  Birmingham, Alabama
- Game start: 7:00 p.m.
- Game attendance: 8,114
- Television network: USA

Scoring summary
2	Birmingham	Steve Avery 11-yard pass from Brent Pease (Win Lyle kick)	Birmingham 7–0
2	Birmingham	San Antonio snapped ball out of end zone for a safety	Birmingham 9–0
2	Birmingham	Steve Avery 32-yard pass from Brent Pease (Win Lyle kick)	Birmingham 16–0
4	San Antonio	Jim Gallery 35-yard field goal	Birmingham 16–3
4	San Antonio	Lee Morris 73-yard pass from Mike Johnson (Jim Gallery kick)	Birmingham 16–10
4	San Antonio	Kirk Maggio runs out of the back of the end zone for a safety	Birmingham 16–12

Against the San Antonio Riders, the Fire won 16–12 in rainy conditions at Legion Field. After a scoreless first quarter, Birmingham scored all 16 of their points during a 3.5 minute span in the second quarter. The first touchdown was scored on an 11-yard pass from Brent Pease to Steve Avery for a 7–0 lead. On the San Antonio possession that followed, Riders long snapper Eddie Grant snapped the ball over the head of punter Kent Sullivan out of the back of the end zone for a safety and a 9–0 Fire lead. Birmingham then scored their second touchdown on the possession that followed the safety with a 32-yard Pease pass to Avery for a 16–0 lead.

After a scoreless third quarter, San Antonio mounted a fourth quarter rally only to fall short and lose the game 16–12. After a 35-yard Jim Gallery field goal, the Riders scored their only touchdown on a 73-yard Mike Johnson pass to Lee Morris. With 1:30 remaining in the game, John Holland intercepted a Johnson pass; however, San Antonio held the Fire to force a punt. As they were punting from their own endzone, Kirk Maggio took the safety for Birmingham to set up a better free kick with only 0:22 left in the game. Arthur Hunter then intercepted a Johnson pass at the Fire two-yard line as time expired to preserve the Birmingham victory. The victory improved the Fire's record to 3–3.

==== Week 7: at Barcelona Dragons ====
Team	1	2	3	4	Total
Fire	0	0	0	6	6
• Dragons	2	6	0	3	11

- Date: May 4
- Location: Montjuic Stadium
  Barcelona, Spain
- Game start: 1:00 p.m.
- Game attendance: 31,490
- Television network: USA

Scoring summary
1	Barcelona	Elroy Harris tackled by Eric Lindstrom in the end zone for a safety	Barcelona 2–0
2	Barcelona	Lydell Carr 3-yard run (Massimo Manca kick failed)	Barcelona 8–0
4	Birmingham	Stacey Mobley 42-yard pass from Eric Jones (Win Lyle kick failed)	Barcelona 8–6
4	Barcelona	Massimo Manca 26-yard field goal	Barcelona 11–6

In their first European road game of the season, the Fire lost 11–6 to the Barcelona Dragons at Montjuic Stadium in Spain. The Dragons scored their first points on the first offensive play of the game when Eric Lindstrom tackled Elroy Harris in the endzone for a safety and a 2–0 lead. In the second quarter Barcelona extended their lead to 8–0 after Lydell Carr scored on a three-yard touchdown run to complete an 89-yard drive. After a scoreless third quarter, Birmingham cut the Barcelona lead to 8–6 when Eric Jones threw a 42-yard touchdown pass to Stacey Mobley. Massimo Manca then provided for the final margin with his 26-yard field goal for the Dragons late in the game. In the game, Barcelona quarterback Tony Rice completed 20 of 25 passes for 354 yards passing. The loss brought the Fire's record to 3–4.

==== Week 8: at Frankfurt Galaxy ====
Team	1	2	3	4	Total
Fire	0	3	0	0	3
• Galaxy	0	3	7	0	10

- Date: May 12
- Location: Waldstadion
  Frankfurt, Germany
- Game start: 12:00 p.m.
- Game attendance: 28,127
- Television network: ABC

Scoring summary
2	Birmingham	Win Lyle 43-yard field goal	Birmingham 3–0
2	Frankfurt	Tom Whelihan 32-yard field goal	3–3
3	Frankfurt	Tony Baker 2-yard run (Tom Whelihan kick)	Frankfurt 10–3

In their second consecutive European road game of the season, the Fire lost 10–3 to the Frankfurt Galaxy at Waldstadion in Germany. After a scoreless first quarter, Win Lyle converted a 43-yard field goal for the Fire and Tom Whelihan converted from 32-yards for the Galaxy for a 3–3 tie at halftime. The game-winning touchdown for Frankfurt was scored in the third quarter on a two-yard Tony Baker run. The loss brought the Fire's record to 3–5.

==== Week 9: vs. New York/New Jersey Knights ====
Team	1	2	3	4	Total
Knights	0	0	0	14	14
• Fire	7	3	7	7	24

- Date: May 20
- Location: Legion Field
  Birmingham, Alabama
- Game start: 7:00 p.m.
- Game attendance: 31,211
- Television network: USA

Scoring summary
1	Birmingham	Arthur Hunter 37-yard interception return (Win Lyle kick)	Birmingham 7–0
2	Birmingham	Win Lyle 20-yard field goal	Birmingham 10–0
3	Birmingham	Kenny Bell 65-yard pass from Kirk Maggio on a fake punt (Win Lyle kick)	Birmingham 17–0
4	New York	Eric Wilkerson 25-yard pass from Jeff Graham (Kendall Trainor kick)	Birmingham 17–7
4	New York	Mark Moore 20-yard fumble return (Kendall Trainor kick)	Birmingham 17–14
4	Birmingham	Tony Bowick 35-yard fumble return (Win Lyle kick)	Birmingham 24–14

In what was their final regular season home game, the Fire defeated the New York/New Jersey Knights 24–14 at Legion Field. Birmingham took a 10–0 lead into halftime after Arthur Hunter intercepted a Jeff Graham pass and returned it 37-yards for a touchdown in the first and Win Lyle converted a 20-yard field goal in the second quarter. In the third quarter, the Fire extended their lead to 17–0 after a successful fake punt resulted in a touchdown when Kirk Maggio threw a 65-yard pass to Kenny Bell.

The Knights responded in the fourth quarter with a pair of touchdowns to cut the Fire lead to 17–14. The rally started after New York recovered a Willie Bouyer fumble at the Birmingham 25-yard line. On the next play, Jeff Graham threw a 25-yard touchdown pass to Eric Wilkerson. Later in the quarter, Fire quarterback Eric Jones fumbled the ball on a quarterback sack that was returned by Mark Moore 20-yards for a touchdown. However, the comeback was halted late in the fourth after Steve Hyche caused a Jeff Graham fumble that was returned 35-yards for a touchdown by Tony Bowick. The victory improved the Fire's record to 4–5.

==== Week 10: at Raleigh–Durham Skyhawks ====
Team	1	2	3	4	Total
• Fire	7	0	7	14	28
Skyhawks	0	7	0	0	7

- Date: May 25
- Location: Carter–Finley Stadium
  Raleigh, North Carolina
- Game start: 2:00 p.m.
- Game attendance: 16,335
- Television network: ABC

Scoring summary
1	Birmingham	Stacey Mobley 5-yard run (Win Lyle kick)	Birmingham 7–0
2	Raleigh–Durham	John Burch 2-yard run (Wilson Hoyle kick)	7–7
3	Birmingham	James Henry 50-yard punt return (Win Lyle kick)	Birmingham 14–7
4	Birmingham	Elroy Harris 13-yard run (Win Lyle kick)	Birmingham 21–7
4	Birmingham	Steve Avery 9-yard run (Win Lyle kick)	Birmingham 28–7

In their final regular season game, the Fire defeated the Raleigh–Durham Skyhawks 28–7 at Carter–Finley Stadium to clinch a playoff spot as the North America West division champions. Birmingham opened the scoring with a five-yard Stacey Mobley touchdown run in the first, and Raleigh–Durham responded in the second quarter with a two-yard John Burch touchdown run to tie the game at 7–7 at halftime. Early in the third, the Fire took a 14–7 lead after James Henry returned a Skyhawks punt 50-yards for a touchdown. The third Birmingham touchdown was set up in the fourth quarter after Phil Ross recovered a Marvin Hargrove fumble at Raleigh–Durham 13-yard line. On the next play, Elroy Harris scored on a 13-yard touchdown run. Steve Avery then provided the final points in the 28–7 Fire victory with his nine-yard run. The victory improved the Fire's record to 5–5 as they entered the playoffs.

== Postseason ==
=== Schedule ===
Round	Date	Kickoff	Opponent	Result	Record	Venue	Attendance	Source
Semifinal	Saturday, June 1	7:00 p.m.	Barcelona Dragons	L 3–10	0–1	Legion Field	40,500	

=== Game summary ===
==== WLAF Semifinal: vs. Barcelona Dragons ====
Team	1	2	3	4	Total
• Dragons	0	10	0	0	10
Fire	0	0	0	3	3

- Date: June 1
- Location: Legion Field
  Birmingham, Alabama
- Game start: 7:00 p.m.
- Game attendance: 37,590
- Television network: USA

Scoring summary
2	Barcelona	Massimo Manca 25-yard field goal	Barcelona 3–0
2	Barcelona	Thomas Woods 6-yard pass from Scott Erney (Massimo Manca kick)	Barcelona 10–0
4	Birmingham	Win Lyle 28-yard field goal	Barcelona 10–3

Against the Barcelona Dragons in the semifinals of the WLAF playoffs, the Fire lost 10–3 at Legion Field to complete their season. Although Barcelona defeated the Fire in their regular season matchup and had a better overall record, the game was played in Birmingham as the Fire were division champions and the Dragons entered the playoffs as a wild card since London won their division. After a scoreless first quarter, Barcelona scored all of their points in the second quarter. Massimo Manca converted a successful 25-yard field goal and Scott Erney threw a six-yard touchdown pass to Thomas Woods for a 10–0 lead. The only other points in the game came late in the fourth quarter when Win Lyle connected on a 28-yard field goal to make the final score 10–3. With their victory, Barcelona advanced to play the London Monarchs in World Bowl I at Wembley Stadium.

== Staff ==
1991 Birmingham Fire staff
Head coaches: Head coach – Chan Gailey; Offensive coaches: Running backs – Michael O'Toole; Wide receivers – Steve Marks; Offensive line – Joe D'Alessandris	Defensive coaches: Defensive line – Pete Hurt; Linebackers – Gene Smith; Defensive secondary – Stanley King

== Final roster ==
1991 Birmingham Fire final roster
Quarterbacks: 5 Gene Benhart; 7 Eric Jones; 10 Brent Pease; Running backs: 26 Steve Avery; 41 Ken Bell; 31 Elroy Harris; Wide receivers: 80 Willie Bouyer; 83 Stacey Mobley; Tight ends: 87 Mark Hopkins; 82 Phil Ross	Offensive linemen: 50 Bill Anderson C; 73 Buddy King T; 79 R. C. Mullin T; 76 Charles Odiorne G; 61 Michael Pavik G; 63 Rich Schonewolf T; 65 Michael Tanks G; 52 Paul Yniguez G; Defensive linemen: 70 Tony Bowick DE/NT; 98 Pellom McDaniels DE; 71 Otis Moore DE; 62 Darrell Phillips NT; 72 Okland Salave'a DE	Linebackers: 54 John Brantley ILB; 99 Randy Cockrell OLB; 56 Steve Hyche OLB; 75 Junior Jackson ILB; 53 Paul McGowan ILB; 59 Maurice Oliver OLB; 55 Chad Thorson ILB; Defensive backs: 28 Alex Armenteros SS; 48 Steve Gage FS; 45 James Henry CB; 21 John Holland CB; 24 Arthur Hunter SS; 44 John Miller FS; 27 Tracy Sanders CB	Special teams: 1 Win Lyle K; 8 Kirk Maggio P; Operation Discovery: 86 (West Germany) Andreas Motzkus WR; 81 (Italy) Paolo Mutti WR; 84 (East Germany) Hans-Ulrich Riecke WR; 88 (Italy) Sergio Vissa TE; Reserve list: 89 Ted Wilson WR (IR)

== Awards ==
After the completion of the regular season, the All-World League Team was selected by the league's ten head coaches. Overall, Birmingham had five players selected, with two on the first team and three on the second team. The five selections were:

- John Brantley, Linebacker, 1st Team
- John Miller, Free safety, 1st Team
- Darrell Phillips, Nose tackle, 2nd Team
- John Holland, Cornerback, 2nd Team
- Kirk Maggio, Punter, 2nd Team

== Standings ==
North American West Division
Team	W	L	T	PCT	PF	PA	DIV	STK
Birmingham Fire	5	5	0	.500	140	140	2–0	W2
San Antonio Riders	4	6	0	.400	176	196	1–1	L1
Sacramento Surge	3	7	0	.300	179	226	0–2	W1
