= 1989 Seattle Seahawks season =

American football team season

- Owner: Ken Behring
- General manager: Tom Flores
- Head coach: Chuck Knox
- Offensive coordinator: John Becker
- Defensive coordinator: Tom Catlin
- Home stadium: Kingdome

Results
- Record: 7–9
- Division place: 4th AFC West
- Playoffs: Did not qualify
- All-Pros: ST Rufus Porter (1st team)
- Pro Bowlers: QB Dave Krieg; WR Brian Blades; LB Rufus Porter

The 1989 Seattle Seahawks season was the team's 14th season with the National Football League (NFL). The season marked the end of an era for the team, as the last remaining original Seahawk, longtime wide receiver Steve Largent, retired after playing 14 seasons in the league, all with the Seahawks. At the time of his retirement, he was the NFL's all-time reception leader.

== Offseason ==
=== Draft ===
1989 Seattle Seahawks draft
| Round | Pick | Player | Position | College | Notes |
| 1 | 15 | Andy Heck | Offensive tackle | Notre Dame | |
| 2 | 44 | Joe Tofflemire | Center | Arizona | |
| 3 | 71 | Elroy Harris | Running back | Eastern Kentucky | |
| 4 | 101 | Travis McNeal | Tight end | Tennessee-Chattanooga | |
| 4 | 103 | James Henry | Cornerback | Southern Miss | |
| 7 | 184 | Mike Nettles | Cornerback | Memphis State | |
| 8 | 211 | Marlin Williams | Defensive end | Western Illinois | |
| 9 | 238 | David Franks | Guard | Connecticut | |
| 10 | 268 | Derrick Fenner | Running back | North Carolina | |
| 11 | 295 | Mike Baum | Defensive end | Northwestern | |
| 12 | 322 | R. J. Kors | Safety | Long Beach State | |
Made roster

=== Undrafted free agents ===
1989 undrafted free agents of note
| Player | Position | College |
|---|---|---|
| Willie Bouyer | Wide receiver | Michigan State |
| Tony Brown | Fullback | Western Kentucky |
| Tyler Burdick | Tight end | Toledo |
| Karl Burnige | Offensive tackle | Oregon Tech |
| Gilbert Dudley | Defensive end | Tennessee–Martin |
| Darryl Hall | Safety | Washington |
| Jesse Hatcher | Linebacker | Clemson |
| Smokey Hodge | Linebacker | Auburn |
| Tony Logan | Wide receiver | Nevada |
| Boo Mitchell | Wide receiver | Vanderbilt |
| Alex Morris | Cornerback | Texas A&M |
| Robert Pickett | Linebacker | West Virginia |
| Mike Ramos | Safety | Washington |
| Lee Marke Sellers | Tight end | Auburn |
| Rod Stephens | Linebacker | Georgia Tech |
| Jeff Stephenson | Linebacker | St. Cloud State |
| Mike Stumberg | Linebacker | Central College |

== Personnel ==
=== Staff ===
1989 Seattle Seahawks staff
| Front office: Owner – Ken Behring; President/general manager – Tom Flores; Vice president/assistant general manager – Chuck Allen; Player personnel director – Mike Allman; Assistant player personnel director – Rick Thompson; Pro personnel assistant – Randy Mueller; Head coaches: Head coach – Chuck Knox; Assistant head coach – Tom Catlin; Offensive coaches: Offensive coordinator/receivers – John Becker; Quarterbacks – Ken Meyer; Offensive backs – Chick Harris; Tight ends – Russ Purnell; Offensive line – Kent Stephenson | Defensive coaches: Defensive coordinator/linebackers – Tom Catlin; Defensive line – George Dyer; Assistant linebackers – Rusty Tillman; Defensive backs – Rod Perry; Special assignments – Joe Vitt; Special teams coaches: Special teams – Rusty Tillman; Assistant special teams – Russ Purnell |

=== Final roster ===
1989 Seattle Seahawks roster
| Quarterbacks (QB): 15 Jeff Kemp; 17 Dave Krieg; 11 Kelly Stouffer; Running backs (RB): 44 Derrick Fenner; 33 Elroy Harris; 28 Curt Warner; 32 John L. Williams FB; Wide receivers (WR): 89 Brian Blades; 88 Jeff Chadwick; 84 Louis Clark; 80 Steve Largent; 82 Paul Skansi; Tight ends (TE): 83 Rod Jones; 86 Travis McNeal | Offensive linemen (OL): 65 Edwin Bailey G; 64 Darrick Brilz G; 54 Grant Feasel C; 66 Andy Heck T; 70 Ron Mattes T; 71 Bryan Millard G; 56 Joe Tofflemire C; 75 Mike Wilson T; Defensive linemen (DL): 77 Jeff Bryant DE; 90 Jethro Franklin DE; 79 Jacob Green DE; 63 Roy Hart NT; 72 Joe Nash NT; 98 Elston Ridgle DE | Linebackers (LB): 59 Joe Cain OLB; 53 Darren Comeaux ILB; 52 M. L. Johnson OLB; 91 Darrin Miller ILB; 97 Rufus Porter OLB; 94 Rod Stephens ILB; 57 Tony Woods OLB; 92 Dave Wyman ILB; Defensive backs (DB): 22 Nesby Glasgow SS; 29 Dwayne Harper CB; 25 David Hollis SS; 23 Patrick Hunter CB; 26 James Jefferson CB; 24 Mel Jenkins CB; 23 Thom Kaumeyer CB/S; 41 Eugene Robinson FS; Special teams (ST): 9 Norm Johnson K; 85 Harper LeBel LS; 5 Ruben Rodriguez P | Practice squad: 8 Willie Bouyer WR; 42 Richard Shelton CB; Reserve: 55 Brian Bosworth LB (IR); 81 Donnie Dee TE (IR); 34 Kevin Harmon RB (IR); 30 James Jones FB (IR); 81 Tommy Kane WR (IR); 21 Paul Moyer S (IR); -- Pat Pearson G (IR); -- Jim Sandusky WR (PUP); 87 Robert Tyler TE (IR); 74 Warren Wheat G (IR); Rookies in italics 47 active, 10 reserve, 2 practice squad |

- (*) Denotes players that were selected for the 1990 Pro Bowl.

== Schedule ==
=== Preseason ===
| Week | Date | Opponent | Result | Record | Venue | Recap |
|---|---|---|---|---|---|---|
| 1 | August 11 | at Phoenix Cardinals | **W** 16–10 (OT) | 1–0 | Sun Devil Stadium | Recap |
| 2 | August 19 | at New England Patriots | **L** 12–17 | 1–1 | Busch Stadium | Recap |
| 3 | August 25 | Detroit Lions | **W** 13–7 | 2–1 | Kingdome | Recap |
| 4 | September 1 | San Francisco 49ers | **W** 28–17 | 3–1 | Kingdome | Recap |

Source: Seahawks Media Guides

=== Regular season ===
Divisional matchups have the AFC West playing the NFC East.

| Week | Date | Opponent | Result | Record | Venue | Recap |
|---|---|---|---|---|---|---|
| 1 | September 10 | at Philadelphia Eagles | **L** 7–31 | 0–1 | Veterans Stadium | Recap |
| 2 | September 17 | Phoenix Cardinals | **L** 24–34 | 0–2 | Kingdome | Recap |
| 3 | September 24 | at New England Patriots | **W** 24–3 | 1–2 | Foxboro Stadium | Recap |
| 4 | October 1 | at **Los Angeles Raiders** | **W** 24–20 | 2–2 | Los Angeles Memorial Coliseum | Recap |
| 5 | October 8 | **Kansas City Chiefs** | **L** 16–20 | 2–3 | Kingdome | Recap |
| 6 | October 15 | at **San Diego Chargers** | **W** 17–16 | 3–3 | Jack Murphy Stadium | Recap |
| 7 | October 22 | **Denver Broncos** | **L** 21–24 (OT) | 3–4 | Kingdome | Recap |
| 8 | October 29 | **San Diego Chargers** | **W** 10–7 | 4–4 | Kingdome | Recap |
| 9 | November 5 | at **Kansas City Chiefs** | **L** 10–20 | 4–5 | Arrowhead Stadium | Recap |
| 10 | November 12 | Cleveland Browns | **L** 7–17 | 4–6 | Kingdome | Recap |
| 11 | November 19 | at New York Giants | **L** 3–15 | 4–7 | Giants Stadium | Recap |
| 12 | November 26 | at **Denver Broncos** | **L** 14–41 | 4–8 | Mile High Stadium | Recap |
| 13 | December 4 | Buffalo Bills | **W** 17–16 | 5–8 | Kingdome | Recap |
| 14 | December 10 | at Cincinnati Bengals | **W** 24–17 | 6–8 | Riverfront Stadium | Recap |
| 15 | December 17 | **Los Angeles Raiders** | **W** 23–17 | 7–8 | Kingdome | Recap |
| 16 | December 23 | Washington Redskins | **L** 0–29 | 7–9 | Kingdome | Recap |
Note: Intra-division opponents are in **bold** text.

Source: 1989 NFL season results

== Standings ==
AFC West
| | W | L | T | PCT | DIV | CONF | PF | PA | STK |
|---|---|---|---|---|---|---|---|---|---|
| ^{(1)} Denver Broncos | 11 | 5 | 0 | .688 | 6–2 | 9–3 | 362 | 226 | L1 |
| Kansas City Chiefs | 8 | 7 | 1 | .531 | 3–5 | 6–7–1 | 318 | 286 | W1 |
| Los Angeles Raiders | 8 | 8 | 0 | .500 | 3–5 | 6–6 | 315 | 297 | L2 |
| Seattle Seahawks | 7 | 9 | 0 | .438 | 4–4 | 7–5 | 241 | 327 | L1 |
| San Diego Chargers | 6 | 10 | 0 | .375 | 4–4 | 4–8 | 266 | 290 | W2 |

== Game summaries ==
=== Preseason ===
==== Week P1: at Phoenix Cardinals ====
Preseason Week One: Seattle Seahawks at Phoenix Cardinals – Game summary

| Quarter | 1 | 2 | 3 | 4 | OT | Total |
|---|---|---|---|---|---|---|
| Seahawks | 0 | 3 | 7 | 0 | 6 | 16 |
| Cardinals | 3 | 0 | 0 | 7 | 0 | 10 |

at Sun Devil Stadium, Tempe, Arizona

- Date: August 11
- Game time: 7:30 pm local
- Game weather: partly cloudy, 99 °F (37 °C), wind N 8 miles per hour (13 km/h)
- Game attendance: 37,158
- Referee: Howard Roe
- Gamebook

==== Week P2: vs. New England Patriots ====
Preseason Week Two: Seattle Seahawks vs. New England Patriots – Game summary

| Quarter | 1 | 2 | 3 | 4 | Total |
|---|---|---|---|---|---|
| Seahawks | 0 | 6 | 6 | 0 | 12 |
| Patriots | 0 | 10 | 7 | 0 | 17 |

at Busch Memorial Stadium, St. Louis, Missouri

- Date: August 19
- Game time: 8:00 pm local
- Game weather: cloudy, 75 °F (24 °C), wind S 14 miles per hour (23 km/h)
- Game attendance: 48,746
- Referee: Gene Barth
- Gamebook

==== Week P3: vs. Detroit Lions ====
Preseason Week Three: Seattle Seahawks vs. Detroit Lions – Game summary

| Quarter | 1 | 2 | 3 | 4 | Total |
|---|---|---|---|---|---|
| Lions | 0 | 0 | 0 | 7 | 7 |
| Seahawks | 3 | 3 | 7 | 0 | 13 |

at Kingdome, Seattle

- Date: August 25
- Game time: 7:36 pm local
- Game weather: indoors
- Game attendance: 55,829
- Referee: Jim Tunney
- Gamebook

==== Week P4: vs. San Francisco 49ers ====
Preseason Week Four: Seattle Seahawks vs. San Francisco 49ers – Game summary

| Quarter | 1 | 2 | 3 | 4 | Total |
|---|---|---|---|---|---|
| 49ers | 0 | 10 | 7 | 0 | 17 |
| Seahawks | 7 | 0 | 14 | 7 | 28 |

at Kingdome, Seattle

- Date: September 1
- Game time: 6:08 pm local
- Game weather: indoors
- Game attendance: 58,641
- Referee: Red Cashion
- Gamebook

=== Regular season ===
==== Week 1: at Philadelphia Eagles ====
Week One: Seattle Seahawks at Philadelphia Eagles – Game summary

| Quarter | 1 | 2 | 3 | 4 | Total |
|---|---|---|---|---|---|
| Seahawks | 7 | 0 | 0 | 0 | 7 |
| Eagles | 7 | 10 | 7 | 7 | 31 |

at Veterans Stadium, Philadelphia, Pennsylvania

- Date: September 10
- Game time: 4:00 pm local
- Game weather: clear, 93 °F (34 °C), 46% humidity, wind SW 9 miles per hour (14 km/h)
- Game attendance: 64,287
- Referee: Gordon McCarter
- TV announcers (NBC): Joel Meyers & Paul Maguire
- Gamebook

Game information

First quarter

- PHI – Anthony Toney 1-yard run (Luis Zendejas kick), 11:49 (PHI 7–0)
- SEA – Steve Largent 23-yard pass from Dave Krieg (Norm Johnson kick), 1:56 (Tied 7–7)

Second quarter

- PHI – Luis Zendejas 24-yard field goal, 11:27 (PHI 10–7)
- PHI – Cris Carter 8-yard pass from Randall Cunningham (Luis Zendejas kick), 4:51 (PHI 17–7)

Third quarter

- PHI – Mike Quick 8-yard pass from Randall Cunningham (Luis Zendejas kick), 9:49 (PHI 24–7)

Fourth quarter

- PHI – Eric Everett 30-yard interception return (Luis Zendejas kick), 2:36 (PHI 31–7)

Top passers

- SEA – Dave Krieg: 15/34, 210 yds, 1 TD, 2 INT
- PHI – Randall Cunningham: 13/27, 240 yds, 2 TD

Top rushers

- SEA – Curt Warner: 12 car, 47 yds
- PHI – Mark Higgs: 13 car, 44 yds

Top receivers

- SEA – Louis Clark: 3 rec, 63 yds
- PHI – Mike Quick: 6 rec, 140 yds, 1 TD

Team – pass – rush – total – to

- SEA – 193 – 77 – 270 – 3
- PHI – 234 – 131 – 365 – 0

==== Week 2: vs. Phoenix Cardinals ====
Week Two: Seattle Seahawks vs. Phoenix Cardinals – Game summary

| Quarter | 1 | 2 | 3 | 4 | Total |
|---|---|---|---|---|---|
| Cardinals | 13 | 0 | 7 | 14 | 34 |
| Seahawks | 0 | 7 | 7 | 10 | 24 |

at Kingdome, Seattle

- Date: September 17
- Game time: 1:02 pm local
- Game weather: indoors
- Game attendance: 60,444
- Referee: Pat Haggerty
- TV announcers (CBS): Tim Ryan & Randy Cross
- Gamebook

Game information

First quarter

- PHX – Roy Green 51-yard pass from Gary Hogeboom (PAT blocked), 12:20 (PHX 6–0)
- PHX – Tony Jordan 1-yard run (Al Del Greco kick), 2:16 (PHX 13–0)

Second quarter

- SEA – Paul Skansi 3-yard pass from Dave Krieg (Norm Johnson kick), 8:23 (PHX 13–7)

Third quarter

- PHX – J.T. Smith 25-yard pass from Gary Hogeboom (Al Del Greco kick), 11:50 (PHX 20–7)
- SEA – Paul Skansi 17-yard pass from Dave Krieg (Norm Johnson kick), 7:59 (PHX 20–14)

Fourth quarter

- PHX – Roy Green 6-yard pass from Gary Hogeboom (Al Del Greco kick), 14:52 (PHX 27–14)
- SEA – Norm Johnson 39-yard field goal, 7:55 (PHX 27–17)
- PHX – Roy Green 59-yard pass from Gary Hogeboom (Al Del Greco kick), 4:16 (PHX 34–17)
- SEA – Brian Blades 5-yard pass from Dave Krieg (Norm Johnson kick), 1:45 (PHX 34–24)

Top passers

- PHX – Gary Hogeboom: 18/24, 298 yds, 4 TD, 1 INT
- SEA – Dave Krieg: 25/43, 279 yds, 3 TD, 1 INT

Top rushers

- PHX – Stump Mitchell: 18 car, 95 yds
- SEA – John L. Williams: 9 car, 36 yds

Top receivers

- PHX – Roy Green: 8 rec, 166 yds, 3 TD
- SEA – Brian Blades: 9 rec, 146 yds, 1 TD

Team – pass – rush – total – to

- PHX – 298 – 171 – 469 – 2
- SEA – 269 – 77 – 346 – 1

==== Week 3: at New England Patriots ====
Week Three: Seattle Seahawks at New England Patriots – Game summary

| Quarter | 1 | 2 | 3 | 4 | Total |
|---|---|---|---|---|---|
| Seahawks | 0 | 21 | 3 | 0 | 24 |
| Patriots | 3 | 0 | 0 | 0 | 3 |

at Sullivan Stadium, Foxborough, Massachusetts

- Date: September 24
- Game time: 1:00 pm local
- Game weather: clear, 58 °F (14 °C), 52% humidity, wind NW 20 miles per hour (32 km/h)
- Game attendance: 48,025
- Referee: Bob McElwee
- TV announcers (NBC): Don Criqui & Ahmad Rashad
- Gamebook

Game information

First quarter

- NE – Greg Davis 35-yard field goal, 3:36 (NE 3–0)

Second quarter

- SEA – Louis Clark 27-yard pass from Dave Krieg (Norm Johnson kick), 8:15 (SEA 7–3)
- SEA – Paul Skansi 19-yard pass from Dave Krieg (Norm Johnson kick), 1:43 (SEA 14–3)
- SEA – John L. Williams 10-yard pass from Dave Krieg (Norm Johnson kick), 0:35 (SEA 21–3)

Third quarter

- SEA – Norm Johnson 23-yard field goal, 8:03 (SEA 24–3)

Fourth quarter

- No scoring plays

Top passers

- SEA – Dave Krieg: 14/24, 177 yds, 3 TD
- NE – Tony Eason: 17/33, 147 yds, 1 INT

Top rushers

- SEA – Curt Warner: 16 car, 65 yds
- NE – Bob Perryman: 11 car, 46 yds

Top receivers

- SEA – John L. Williams: 5 rec, 71 yds, 1 TD
- NE – Bob Perryman: 5 rec, 44 yds

Team – pass – rush – total – to

- SEA – 159 – 157 – 316 – 0
- NE – 128 – 91 – 219 – 3

==== Week 4: at Los Angeles Raiders ====
Week Four: Seattle Seahawks at Los Angeles Raiders – Game summary

| Quarter | 1 | 2 | 3 | 4 | Total |
|---|---|---|---|---|---|
| Seahawks | 7 | 0 | 0 | 17 | 24 |
| Raiders | 0 | 10 | 7 | 3 | 20 |

at Los Angeles Memorial Coliseum, Los Angeles

- Date: October 1
- Game time: 1:02 pm local
- Game weather: hazy, 74 °F (23 °C), 41% humidity, wind SE 5 miles per hour (8.0 km/h)
- Game attendance: 44,319
- Referee: Dick Jorgensen
- TV announcers (NBC): Dick Enberg and Bill Walsh
- Gamebook

Game information

First quarter

- SEA – John L. Williams 14-yard pass from Dave Krieg (Norm Johnson kick), 6:31 (SEA 7–0)

Second quarter

- LA – Jeff Jaeger 45-yard field goal, 8:42 (SEA 7–3)
- LA – Lionel Washington 37-yard fumble return (Jeff Jaeger kick), 6:18 (LA 10–7)

Third quarter

- LA – Mervyn Fernandez 36-yard pass from Jay Schroeder (Jeff Jaeger kick), 9:39 (LA 17–7)

Fourth quarter

- SEA – Curt Warner 6-yard run (Norm Johnson kick), 14:02 (LA 17–14)
- SEA – Brian Blades 19-yard pass from Dave Krieg (Norm Johnson kick), 9:58 (SEA 21–17)
- LA – Jeff Jaeger 28-yard field goal, 5:58 (SEA 21–20)
- SEA – Norm Johnson 48-yard field goal, 1:15 (SEA 24–20)

Top passers

- SEA – Dave Krieg: 22/31, 227 yds, 2 TD
- LA – Jay Schroeder: 16/30, 213 yds, 1 TD, 1 INT

Top rushers

- SEA – Curt Warner: 21 car, 102 yds, 1 TD
- LA – Marcus Allen: 11 car, 65 yds

Top receivers

- SEA – Brian Blades: 7 rec, 113 yds, 1 TD
- LA – Mervyn Fernandez: 7 rec, 113 yds, 1 TD

Team – pass – rush – total – to

- SEA – 194 – 160 – 354 – 2
- LA – 197 – 114 – 311 – 2

==== Week 5: vs. Kansas City Chiefs ====
Week Five: Seattle Seahawks vs. Kansas City Chiefs – Game summary

| Quarter | 1 | 2 | 3 | 4 | Total |
|---|---|---|---|---|---|
| Chiefs | 3 | 0 | 7 | 10 | 20 |
| Seahawks | 7 | 9 | 0 | 0 | 16 |

at Kingdome, Seattle

- Date: October 8
- Game time: 1:03 pm local
- Game weather: indoors
- Game attendance: 60,715
- Referee: Dick Hantak
- TV announcers (NBC): Don Criqui & Ahmad Rashad
- Gamebook

Game information

First quarter

- SEA – James Jefferson 97-yard kickoff return (Norm Johnson kick), 14:43 (SEA 7–0)
- KC – Nick Lowery 39-yard field goal, 4:29 (SEA 7–3)

Second quarter

- SEA – Norm Johnson 37-yard field goal, 5:03 (SEA 10–3)
- SEA – Norm Johnson 26-yard field goal, 1:49 (SEA 13–3)
- SEA – Norm Johnson 37-yard field goal, 0:04 (SEA 16–3)

Third quarter

- KC – Christian Okoye 13-yard run (Nick Lowery kick), 7:53 (SEA 16–10)

Fourth quarter

- KC – Nick Lowery 25-yard field goal, 11:52 (SEA 16–13)
- KC – Alfredo Roberts 2-yard pass from Ron Jaworski (Nick Lowery kick), 9:27 (KC 20–16)

Top passers

- KC – Ron Jaworski: 12/18, 104 yds, 1 TD
- SEA – Dave Krieg: 20/36, 252 yds, 2 INT

Top rushers

- KC – Christian Okoye: 30 car, 156 yds, 1 TD
- SEA – Dave Krieg: 3 car, 29 yds

Top receivers

- KC – Emile Harry: 3 rec, 41 yds
- SEA – Brian Blades: 4 rec, 86 yds

Team – pass – rush – total – to

- KC – 104 – 199 – 303 – 1
- SEA – 236 – 52 – 288 – 2

==== Week 6: at San Diego Chargers ====
Week Six: Seattle Seahawks at San Diego Chargers – Game summary

| Quarter | 1 | 2 | 3 | 4 | Total |
|---|---|---|---|---|---|
| Seahawks | 10 | 0 | 7 | 0 | 17 |
| Chargers | 7 | 3 | 0 | 6 | 16 |

at San Diego Stadium, San Diego, California

- Date: October 15
- Game time: 1:00 pm local
- Game weather: partly cloudy, 67 °F (19 °C), 47% humidity, wind WNW 15 miles per hour (24 km/h)
- Game attendance: 50,079
- Referee: Red Cashion
- TV announcers (NBC): Charlie Jones & Merlin Olsen
- Gamebook

Game information

First quarter

- SD – Arthur Cox 3-yard pass from Jim McMahon (Chris Bahr kick), 10:25 (SD 7–0)
- SEA – Curt Warner 1-yard run (Norm Johnson kick), 5:15 (Tied 7–7)
- SEA – Norm Johnson 50-yard field goal, 0:04 (SEA 10–7)

Second quarter

- SD – Chris Bahr 29-yard field goal, 8:44 (Tied 10–10)

Third quarter

- SEA – John L. Williams 6-yard pass from Dave Krieg (Norm Johnson kick), 9:35 (SEA 17–10)

Fourth quarter

- SD – Marion Butts 2-yard run (PAT failed), 4:14 (SEA 17–16)

Top passers

- SEA – Dave Krieg: 14/24, 139 yds, 1 TD, 2 INT
- SD – Jim McMahon: 25/39, 286 yds, 1 TD, 2 INT

Top rushers

- SEA – John L. Williams: 11 car, 54 yds
- SD – Tim Spencer: 16 car, 49 yds

Top receivers

- SEA – John L. Williams: 6 rec, 53 yds, 1 TD
- SD – Anthony Miller: 7 rec, 116 yds

Team – pass – rush – total – to

- SEA – 139 – 85 – 224 – 3
- SD – 263 – 99 – 362 – 4

==== Week 7: vs. Denver Broncos ====
Week Seven: Seattle Seahawks vs. Denver Broncos – Game summary

| Quarter | 1 | 2 | 3 | 4 | OT | Total |
|---|---|---|---|---|---|---|
| Broncos | 0 | 0 | 7 | 14 | 3 | 24 |
| Seahawks | 7 | 7 | 0 | 7 | 0 | 21 |

at Kingdome, Seattle

- Date: October 22
- Game time: 1:00 pm local
- Game weather: indoors
- Game attendance: 62,353
- Referee: Johnny Grier
- TV announcers (NBC): Jim Donovan & Jimmy Cefalo
- Gamebook

Game information

First quarter

- SEA – John L. Williams 4-yard run (Norm Johnson kick), 7:37 (SEA 7–0)

Second quarter

- SEA – John L. Williams 6-yard pass from Dave Krieg (Norm Johnson kick), 12:10 (SEA 14–0)

Third quarter

- DEN – Bobby Humphrey 1-yard run (David Treadwell kick), 2:11 (SEA 14–7)

Fourth quarter

- DEN – Clarence Kay 2-yard pass from John Elway (David Treadwell kick), 10:23 (Tied 14–14)
- SEA – Paul Skansi 24-yard pass from Dave Krieg (Norm Johnson kick), 5:33 (SEA 21–14)
- DEN – Vance Johnson 54-yard pass from John Elway (David Treadwell kick), 2:19 (Tied 21–21)
- DEN – David Treadwell 27-yard field goal, 7:14 (DEN 24–21)

Top passers

- DEN – John Elway: 18/35, 344 yds, 2 TD
- SEA – Dave Krieg: 22/38, 237 yds, 2 TD, 2 INT

Top rushers

- DEN – Bobby Humphrey: 17 car, 50 yds, 1 TD
- SEA – Curt Warner: 22 car, 74 yds

Top receivers

- DEN – Mike Young: 6 rec, 137 yds
- SEA – Paul Skansi: 5 rec, 81 yds, 1 TD

Team – pass – rush – total – to

- DEN – 316 – 55 – 371 – 1
- SEA – 224 – 139 – 363 – 4

==== Week 8: vs. San Diego Chargers ====
Week Eight: Seattle Seahawks vs. San Diego Chargers – Game summary

| Quarter | 1 | 2 | 3 | 4 | Total |
|---|---|---|---|---|---|
| Chargers | 0 | 0 | 0 | 7 | 7 |
| Seahawks | 3 | 0 | 0 | 7 | 10 |

at Kingdome, Seattle

- Date: October 29
- Game time: 1:02 pm local
- Game weather: indoors
- Game attendance: 59,691
- Referee: Gene Barth
- TV announcers (NBC): Charlie Jones and Merlin Olsen
- Gamebook

Game information

First quarter

- SEA – Norm Johnson 27-yard field goal, 2:03 (SEA 3–0)

Second quarter

- No scoring plays

Third quarter

- No scoring plays

Fourth quarter

- SD – Arthur Cox 14-yard pass from Jim McMahon (Chris Bahr kick), 1:53 (SD 7–3)
- SEA – Brian Blades 21-yard pass from Dave Krieg (Norm Johnson kick), 0:40 (SEA 10–7)

Top passers

- SD – Jim McMahon: 9/12, 82 yds, 1 TD
- SEA – Dave Krieg: 27/49, 311 yds, 1 TD, 2 INT

Top rushers

- SD – Marion Butts: 7 car, 44 yds
- SEA – Curt Warner: 15 car, 40 yds

Top receivers

- SD – Wayne Walker: 3 rec, 36 yds
- SEA – Brian Blades: 10 rec, 117 yds, 1 TD

Team – pass – rush – total – to

- SD – 103– 92 – 195 – 1
- SEA – 269 – 70 – 339 – 2

==== Week 9: at Kansas City Chiefs ====
Week Nine: Seattle Seahawks at Kansas City Chiefs – Game summary

| Quarter | 1 | 2 | 3 | 4 | Total |
|---|---|---|---|---|---|
| Seahawks | 7 | 3 | 0 | 0 | 10 |
| Chiefs | 7 | 10 | 0 | 3 | 20 |

at Arrowhead Stadium, Kansas City, Missouri

- Date: November 5
- Game time: 12:00 pm local
- Game weather: clear, 63 °F (17 °C), 69% humidity, wind W 17 miles per hour (27 km/h)
- Game attendance: 54,489
- Referee: Ben Dreith
- TV announcers (NBC): Jim Donovan & Jim Laslavic
- Gamebook

Game information

First quarter

- SEA – Nesby Glasgow 38-yard fumble return (Norm Johnson kick), 13:50 (SEA 7–0)
- KC – Christian Okoye 8-yard run (Nick Lowery kick), 8:51 (Tied 7–7)

Second quarter

- KC – Steve Pelluer 10-yard run (Nick Lowery kick), 11:49 (KC 14–7)
- KC – Nick Lowery 34-yard field goal, 4:33 (KC 17–7)
- SEA – Norm Johnson 18-yard field goal, 0:15 (KC 17–10)

Third quarter

- No scoring plays

Fourth quarter

- KC – Nick Lowery 33-yard field goal, 5:37 (KC 20–10)

Top passers

- SEA – Dave Krieg: 14/32, 126 yds
- KC – Steve Pelluer: 7/13, 80 yds

Top rushers

- SEA – John L. Williams: 6 car, 28 yds
- KC – Christian Okoye: 37 car, 126 yds, 1 TD

Top receivers

- SEA – Steve Largent: 3 rec, 47 yds
- KC – Jonathan Hayes: 1 rec, 20 yds

Team – pass – rush – total – to

- SEA – 90 – 39 – 129 – 4
- KC – 69 – 246 – 315 – 2

==== Week 10: vs. Cleveland Browns ====
Week Ten: Seattle Seahawks vs. Cleveland Browns – Game summary

| Quarter | 1 | 2 | 3 | 4 | Total |
|---|---|---|---|---|---|
| Browns | 0 | 7 | 7 | 3 | 17 |
| Seahawks | 7 | 0 | 0 | 0 | 7 |

at Kingdome, Seattle

- Date: November 12
- Game time: 1:02 pm local
- Game weather: indoors
- Game attendance: 58,978
- Referee: Howard Roe
- TV announcers (NBC): Marv Albert & Ahmad Rashad
- Gamebook

Game information

First quarter

- SEA – Brian Blades 8-yard pass from Dave Krieg (Norm Johnson kick), 6:20 (SEA 7–0)

Second quarter

- CLE – Tim Manoa 1-yard run (Matt Bahr kick), 0:23 (Tied 7–7)

Third quarter

- CLE – Lawyer Tillman 17-yard pass from Bernie Kosar (Matt Bahr kick), 3:26 (CLE 14–7)

Fourth quarter

- CLE – Matt Bahr 29-yard field goal, 3:25 (CLE 17–7)

Top passers

- CLE – Bernie Kosar: 16/27, 173 yds, 1 TD
- SEA – Dave Krieg: 17/30, 141 yds, 1 TD, 3 INT

Top rushers

- CLE – Eric Metcalf: 19 car, 75 yds
- SEA – Curt Warner: 13 car, 29 yds

Top receivers

- CLE – Reggie Langhorne: 3 rec, 49 yds
- SEA – Brian Blades: 4 rec, 57 yds, 1 TD

Team – pass – rush – total – to

- CLE – 138 – 139 – 277 – 0
- SEA – 134 – 46 – 180 – 3

==== Week 11: at New York Giants ====
Week Eleven: Seattle Seahawks at New York Giants – Game summary

| Quarter | 1 | 2 | 3 | 4 | Total |
|---|---|---|---|---|---|
| Seahawks | 0 | 0 | 0 | 3 | 3 |
| Giants | 7 | 0 | 8 | 0 | 15 |

at Giants Stadium, East Rutherford, New Jersey

- Date: November 19
- Game time: 4:03 pm local
- Game weather: partly cloudy, 38 °F (3 °C), 47% humidity, wind W 10 miles per hour (16 km/h)
- Game attendance: 75,014
- Referee: Fred Wyant
- TV announcers (NBC): Marv Albert & Bob Trumpy
- Gamebook

Game information

First quarter

- NYG – Howard Cross 16-yard pass from Phil Simms (Björn Nittmo kick), 8:15 (NYG 7–0)

Second quarter

- NYG – Björn Nittmo 32-yard field goal, 11:32 (NYG 10–0)
- NYG – Safety, Kelly Stouffer fumbled ball out of end zone, 10:40 (NYG 12–0)
- NYG – Björn Nittmo 32-yard field goal, 0:32 (NYG 15–0)

Third quarter

- No scoring plays

Fourth quarter

- SEA – Norm Johnson 42-yard field goal, 9:08 (NYG 15–3)

Top passers

- SEA – Kelly Stouffer: 16/29, 155 yds, 2 INT
- NYG – Phil Simms: 17/26, 194 yds, 1 TD

Top rushers

- SEA – John L. Williams: 3 car, 23 yds
- NYG – Lewis Tillman: 13 car, 68 yds

Top receivers

- SEA – Steve Largent: 4 rec, 39 yds
- NYG – Howard Cross: 3 rec, 52 yds, 1 TD

Team – pass – rush – total – to

- SEA – 132 – 63 – 195 – 2
- NYG – 187 – 162 – 349 – 1

==== Week 12: at Denver Broncos ====
Week Twelve: Seattle Seahawks at Denver Broncos – Game summary

| Quarter | 1 | 2 | 3 | 4 | Total |
|---|---|---|---|---|---|
| Seahawks | 0 | 0 | 7 | 7 | 14 |
| Broncos | 14 | 24 | 0 | 3 | 41 |

at Mile High Stadium, Denver, Colorado

- Date: November 26
- Game time: 1:00 pm local
- Game weather: partly cloudy, 61 °F (16 °C), 28% humidity, wind SW 20 miles per hour (32 km/h)
- Game attendance: 75,117
- Referee: Dick Hantak
- TV announcers (NBC): Charlie Jones & Merlin Olsen
- Gamebook

Game information

First quarter

- DEN – Vance Johnson 4-yard pass from John Elway (David Treadwell kick), 5:39 (DEN 7–0)
- DEN – Bobby Humphrey 4-yard run (David Treadwell kick), 1:23 (DEN 14–0)

Second quarter

- DEN – David Treadwell 30-yard field goal, 12:47 (DEN 17–0)
- DEN – Vance Johnson 10-yard pass from John Elway (David Treadwell kick), 5:18 (DEN 24–0)
- DEN – Steve Sewell 32-yard pass from John Elway (David Treadwell kick), 5:00 (DEN 31–0)
- DEN – Mike Young 9-yard pass from John Elway (David Treadwell kick), 1:03 (DEN 38–0)

Third quarter

- SEA – Derrick Fenner 5-yard run (Norm Johnson kick), 1:38 (DEN 38–7)

Fourth quarter

- DEN – David Treadwell 45-yard field goal, 11:05 (DEN 41–7)
- SEA – Steve Largent 31-yard pass from Dave Krieg (Norm Johnson kick), 1:10 (DEN 41–14)

Top passers

- SEA – Dave Krieg: 11/22, 171 yds, 1 TD, 2 INT
- DEN – John Elway: 10/19, 217 yds, 4 TD

Top rushers

- SEA – Curt Warner: 6 car, 51 yds
- DEN – Bobby Humphrey: 25 car, 86 yds, 1 TD

Top receivers

- SEA – Brian Blades: 8 rec, 122 yds
- DEN – Vance Johnson: 6 rec, 154 yds, 2 TD

Team – pass – rush – total – to

- SEA – 192 – 133 – 325 – 4
- DEN – 216 – 137 – 353 – 0

==== Week 13: vs. Buffalo Bills ====
Week Thirteen: Seattle Seahawks vs. Buffalo Bills – Game summary

| Quarter | 1 | 2 | 3 | 4 | Total |
|---|---|---|---|---|---|
| Bills | 0 | 10 | 6 | 0 | 16 |
| Seahawks | 10 | 0 | 0 | 7 | 17 |

at Kingdome, Seattle

- Date: December 4
- Game time: 6:08 pm local
- Game weather: indoors
- Game attendance: 57,682
- Referee: Pat Haggerty
- TV announcers (ABC): Al Michaels, Frank Gifford, and Dan Dierdorf
- Gamebook

Game information

First quarter

- SEA – Norm Johnson 29-yard field goal, 11:04 (SEA 3–0)
- SEA – Curt Warner 1-yard run (Steve Largent run), 6:56 (SEA 10–0)

Second quarter

- BUF – Andre Reed 61-yard pass from Jim Kelly (Scott Norwood kick), 12:52 (SEA 10–7)
- BUF – Scott Norwood 32-yard field goal, 1:08 (Tied 10–10)

Third quarter

- BUF – Scott Norwood 40-yard field goal, 12:131 (BUF 13–10)
- BUF – Scott Norwood 43-yard field goal, 6:40 (BUF 16–10)

Fourth quarter

- SEA – John L. Williams 51-yard pass from Dave Krieg (Norm Johnson kick), 5:38 (SEA 17–16)

Top passers

- BUF – Jim Kelly: 10/23, 144 yds, 1 TD, 1 INT
- SEA – Dave Krieg: 20/40, 298 yds, 1 TD, 2 INT

Top rushers

- BUF – Thurman Thomas: 21 car, 79 yds
- SEA – Curt Warner: 16 car, 57 yds, 1 TD

Top receivers

- BUF – Andre Reed: 2 rec, 77 yds, 1 TD
- SEA – John L. Williams: 5 rec, 80 yds, 1 TD

Team – pass – rush – total – to

- BUF – 135 – 97 – 232 – 2
- SEA – 277 – 78 – 355 – 2

==== Week 14 at Bengals ====
Week Fourteen: Seattle Seahawks at Cincinnati Bengals – Game summary

| Quarter | 1 | 2 | 3 | 4 | Total |
|---|---|---|---|---|---|
| Seahawks | 0 | 7 | 10 | 7 | 24 |
| Bengals | 7 | 3 | 0 | 7 | 17 |

at Riverfront Stadium • Cincinnati, Ohio

- Date: December 10
- Game time: 1:00 pm local
- Game weather: Cloudy • 30 °F (−1 °C) • Wind 12 miles per hour (19 km/h) SW
- Game attendance: 54,744
- Referee: Bob McElwee
- TV announcers (NBC): Don Criqui & Ahmad Rashad
- Play-by-Play

Game information

Seahawks

- Dave Krieg
  22/33, 258 Yds, 3 TD, INT
- Curt Warner
  14 Rush, 51 Yds
- Brian Blades
  6 Rec, 107 Yds, TD

Bengals

- Boomer Esiason
  21/42, 246 yds, TD
- James Brooks
  11 Rush, 52 Yds
- Tim McGee
  7 Rec, 109 Yds, TD

Scoring summary

| Quarter | Time | Drive | | | Team | Scoring information | Score | |
| Quarter | Time | Plays | Yards | TOP | Team | Scoring information | SEA | CIN |
|---|---|---|---|---|---|---|---|---|
| 1 | 5:18 | 3 | 44 | 0:48 | Bengals | Tim McGee 21-yard touchdown reception from Boomer Esiason, Jim Breech kick good | 0 | 7 |
| 2 | 10:37 | 13 | 71 | 5:51 | Bengals | 24-yard field goal by Jim Breech | 0 | 10 |
| 2 | 0:42 | 12 | 78 | 2:25 | Seahawks | Steve Largent 10-yard touchdown reception from Dave Krieg, Norm Johnson kick good | 7 | 10 |
| 3 | 12:58 | 5 | 37 | 1:51 | Seahawks | 48-yard field goal by Norm Johnson | 10 | 10 |
| 3 | 10:14 | 1 | 60 | 0:12 | Seahawks | Brian Blades 60-yard touchdown reception from Dave Krieg, Norm Johnson kick good | 17 | 10 |
| 4 | 9:39 | | | | Bengals | Interception returned 18 yards for touchdown by Eric Thomas, Jim Breech kick good | 17 | 17 |
| 4 | 3:51 | 10 | 80 | 5:42 | Seahawks | Curt Warner 1-yard touchdown reception from Dave Krieg, Norm Johnson kick good | 24 | 17 |
| "TOP" = time of possession. For other American football terms, see Glossary of American football. | | | | | | | 24 | 17 |

==== Week 15: vs. Los Angeles Raiders ====
Week Fifteen: Seattle Seahawks vs. Los Angeles Raiders – Game summary

| Quarter | 1 | 2 | 3 | 4 | Total |
|---|---|---|---|---|---|
| Raiders | 3 | 0 | 14 | 0 | 17 |
| Seahawks | 7 | 6 | 7 | 3 | 23 |

at Kingdome, Seattle

- Date: December 17
- Game time: 5:08 pm local
- Game weather: indoors
- Game attendance: 61,076
- Referee: Red Cashion
- TV announcers (ESPN): Mike Patrick & Joe Theismann
- Gamebook

Game information

First quarter

- SEA – Paul Skansi 5-yard pass from Dave Krieg (Norm Johnson kick), 9:23 (SEA 7–0)
- LA – Jeff Jaeger 19-yard field goal, 1:26 (SEA 7–3)

Second quarter

- SEA – Norm Johnson 29-yard field goal, 10:38 (SEA 10–3)
- SEA – Norm Johnson 25-yard field goal, 1:57 (SEA 13–3)

Third quarter

- LA – Willie Gault 36-yard pass from Steve Beuerlein (Jeff Jaeger kick), 13:07 (SEA 13–10)
- LA – Trey Junkin 1-yard pass from Steve Beuerlein (Jeff Jaeger kick), 9:26 (LA 17–13)
- SEA – John L. Williams 13-yard pass from Dave Krieg (Norm Johnson kick), 1:11 (SEA 20–17)

Fourth quarter

- SEA – Norm Johnson 43-yard field goal, 6:44 (SEA 23–17)

Top passers

- LA – Steve Beuerlein: 13/23, 188 yds, 2 TD, 1 INT
- SEA – Dave Krieg: 25/34, 270 yds, 2 TD

Top rushers

- LA – Bo Jackson: 12 car, 69 yds
- SEA – John L. Williams: 14 car, 38 yds

Top receivers

- LA – Mervyn Fernandez: 6 rec, 73 yds
- SEA – John L. Williams: 12 rec, 129 yds, 1 TD

Team – pass – rush – total – to

- LA – 175 – 98 – 273 – 1
- SEA – 268 – 82 – 350 – 0

==== Week 16: vs. Washington Redskins ====
Week Sixteen: Seattle Seahawks vs. Washington Redskins – Game summary

| Quarter | 1 | 2 | 3 | 4 | Total |
|---|---|---|---|---|---|
| Redskins | 10 | 3 | 16 | 0 | 29 |
| Seahawks | 0 | 0 | 0 | 0 | 0 |

at Kingdome, Seattle

- Date: December 23
- Game time: 1:04 pm local
- Game weather: indoors
- Game attendance: 60,294
- Referee: Ben Dreith
- TV announcers (CBS): Dick Stockton & Dan Fouts
- Gamebook

Game information

First quarter

- WAS – Chip Lohmiller 29-yard field goal, 3:36 (WAS 3–0)
- WAS – Earnest Byner 2-yard run (Chip Lohmiller kick), 2:01 (WAS 10–0)

Second quarter

- WAS – Chip Lohmiller 27-yard field goal, 7:25 (WAS 13–0)

Third quarter

- WAS – Gary Clark 44-yard pass from Mark Rypien (Chip Lohmiller kick), 13:22 (WAS 20–0)
- WAS – Safety, Fred Stokes tackled Dave Krieg in end zone, 13:05 (WAS 22–0)
- WAS – Earnest Byner 8-yard run (Chip Lohmiller kick), 9:27 (WAS 29–0)

Fourth quarter

- No scoring plays

Top passers

- WAS – Mark Rypien: 22/31, 290 yds, 1 TD, 1 INT
- SEA – Dave Krieg: 18/29, 213 yds, 1 INT

Top rushers

- WAS – Earnest Byner: 19 car, 63 yds, 2 TD
- SEA – John L. Williams: 4 car, 9 yds

Top receivers

- WAS – Gary Clark: 9 rec, 149 yds, 1 TD
- SEA – John L. Williams: 6 rec, 65 yds

Team – pass – rush – total – to

- WAS – 319 – 137 – 456 – 1
- SEA – 176 – 25 – 201 – 4

Steve Largent's final game with Seahawks
