= Steven Avery (disambiguation) =

Steven Avery (born 1962) is an American convicted of murder.

Steven, Stephen, or Steve Avery may also refer to:

- Steve Avery (American football) (born 1966), American football running back
- Steve Avery (baseball) (born 1970), American baseball pitcher
- Stephen Morehouse Avery, American screenwriter
