= Paul McGowan (American football) =

American football player (born 1966)

Profile
- Position: Fullback / Linebacker

Personal information
- Born: January 13, 1966 (age 60); Winter Park, Florida, U.S.
- Listed height: 6 ft 2 in (1.88 m)
- Listed weight: 225 lb (102 kg)

Career information
- High school: Winter Park
- College: Florida State
- NFL draft: 1988: 9th round, 237th overall pick

Career history
- Minnesota Vikings (1988)*; Cleveland Browns (1989)*; Birmingham Fire (1991–1992); Orlando Predators (1993–1997)
- * Offseason or practice squad member only

Awards and highlights
- Butkus Award (1987); First-team All-Arena (1994); Second-team All-Arena (1997); First-team All-American (1987); First Team All-South Independent (1985, 1986)

Career AFL statistics
- Tackles: 97
- Sacks: 17
- Rushing attempts: 139
- Rushing yards: 555
- Rushing touchdowns: 11
- Stats at ArenaFan.com

Paul J. McGowan (born January 13, 1966) is an American former professional football player who was a linebacker for the Orlando Predators of the Arena Football League. He played college football for the Florida State Seminoles and was selected by the Minnesota Vikings of the National Football League (NFL) in the ninth round of the 1988 NFL draft.

== College career ==
McGowan played college football at Florida State University. As a senior in 1987 he was an All-American and won the Butkus Award given to the nation's best linebacker.

== Professional career ==
=== Minnesota Vikings ===
McGowan was selected with the 237th overall pick during the 1988 NFL draft. The Vikings cut McGowan during training camp.

=== Cleveland Browns ===
In 1989, the Cleveland Browns signed McGowan, but he was released during the Browns preseason cuts.

=== Birmingham Fire ===
McGowan played for the Birmingham Fire of the World Football League during the 1991 and 1992 seasons.

=== Orlando Predators ===
In 1993, McGowan played for the Orlando Predators of the Arena Football League. McGowan was twice named to All-Arena Teams.
