= Tony Bowick =

American football player (born 1966)

No. 70, 79
- Position: Defensive tackle

Personal information
- Born: October 3, 1966 (age 60); Dothan, Alabama, U.S.
- Listed height: 6 ft 2 in (1.88 m)
- Listed weight: 265 lb (120 kg)

Career information
- High school: Slocomb
- College: Chattanooga
- NFL draft: 1989: 12th round, 313th overall pick

Career history
- Atlanta Falcons (1989); Birmingham Fire (1991-1992); Charlotte Rage (1993–1995); Albany Firebirds (1996–1997); Grand Rapids Rampage (1998–2001); Detroit Fury (2002); Chicago Rush (2003); Austin Wranglers (2004); Grand Rapids Rampage (2005)

Awards and highlights
- ArenaBowl champion (2001)
- Stats at Pro Football Reference

Vantonio Bernard Bowick (born October 3, 1966) is an American former professional football player who played in the National Football League (NFL) and Arena Football League (AFL). He was selected 313th overall by the Atlanta Falcons in the 12th round of the 1989 NFL draft.

Bowick attended Slocomb High School in Slocomb, Alabama and was a student and letterman in football, basketball, and baseball. Bowick played alongside former New York Jets running back Brad Baxter. He continued on to play college football at the University of Tennessee at Chattanooga.

Bowick played one season with the Falcons in the NFL (1989) and one season with the Birmingham Fire in the WLAF (1991–1992). He played 13 seasons in the AFL: Charlotte Rage (1993–1995), Albany Firebirds (1996–1997), Grand Rapids Rampage (1998–2001, 2005), Chicago Rush (2002–2003), Austin Wranglers (2004). He also coached briefly at Dale County High School in Alabama where he was let go after having an inappropriate relationship with at least one student.
