= Pellom McDaniels =

American football player (1968–2020)

No. 98, 77
- Positions: Defensive end, linebacker

Personal information
- Born: February 21, 1968; San Jose, California, U.S.
- Died: April 19, 2020 (aged 52); Atlanta, Georgia, U.S.
- Listed height: 6 ft 3 in (1.91 m)
- Listed weight: 295 lb (134 kg)

Career information
- High school: Silver Creek (CA)
- College: Oregon State
- NFL draft: 1990: undrafted

Career history
- Philadelphia Eagles (1991)*; Birmingham Fire (1991-1992); Kansas City Chiefs (1993–1998); Atlanta Falcons (1999–2000)
- * Offseason or practice squad member only

Awards and highlights
- Second-team All-Pac-10 (1988), (1989)

Career NFL statistics
- Tackles: 103
- Sacks: 7.5
- Fumble recoveries: 2
- Stats at Pro Football Reference

Pellom McDaniels III (February 21, 1968 – April 19, 2020) was an American professional football player who was a defensive lineman in the National Football League (NFL). After his playing career, he became a professor and curator at Emory University.

== Early life ==
McDaniels was born the first child of Pellom and Mary McDaniels. However, he was raised by his maternal grandparents and later went on to attend Silver Creek High School in San Jose.

== Collegiate career ==
McDaniels began his undergraduate studies in Fine Arts at Oregon State University where he experienced success as a student-athlete. He played defensive end for the Oregon State Beavers. In his junior season, he had 42 tackles and a team-high 6.5 sacks. McDaniels earned 2nd team All-Pac-10 honors his senior year after finishing the season with 46 tackles and 4.5 sacks.

== Professional career ==
=== Football ===
Following his collegiate career, McDaniels worked for Procter & Gamble as a Health and Beauty Care representative in the Portland, Oregon area before pursuing a professional football career in the World League of American Football with the Birmingham Fire. In 1991, McDaniels signed his first contract in the National Football League with the Philadelphia Eagles. After having hip surgery, he spent his recovery time coaching football defensive lineman at Sunset High School in Beaverton, Oregon. Pellom spent his evenings after practice working on his own reconditioning and strength building. He was considered one of the best coaches to have worked at Sunset High according to his students. In 1992, the Kansas City Chiefs asked McDaniels to join the team's practice roster, and from 1993 to 1998, he was a part of the heralded defense that countered NFL offenses throughout the 1990s.

While a member of the Kansas City Chiefs, McDaniels became a voice for Kansas City's children and contributed the resources needed to begin the Arts for Smarts foundation. Programs like "Pellom and I Like Art", Wee Art, the "Fish Out Water" Writing program, and Smart Starts were designed to help children and young adults recognize and realize the possibilities for their futures.

=== Academia ===
After spending two seasons with the Atlanta Falcons, McDaniels retired from the NFL and began his pursuit of a graduate degree at Emory University in Atlanta, Georgia where he received both a Master of Arts and a Ph.D. in American Studies. He was an assistant professor in history at the University of Missouri–Kansas City. He was an assistant professor of African American studies and faculty curator of the African American collection in the Manuscript, Archives, and Rare Book Library at Emory University. In February 2009, McDaniels was a key factor in the creation of an exhibit at the William T. Kemper Foundation Art Gallery commemorating African Americans who had fought in the First World War.

His publications included: "The Prince of Jockeys: The Life of Isaac Burns Murphy" (2013); So, You Want to be Pro (2000), My Own Harlem (1998); "We're American Too: The Negro Leagues and the Philosophy of Resistance" in Baseball and Philosophy: Thinking Outside the Batter's Box (2004); reviews in Hampton University's International Review of African American Art related to the work of artists Kadir Nelson and Hale Woodruff.

== Legacy ==
In December 2014, McDaniels was announced as one of the six recipients of the 2015 Silver Anniversary Awards, presented annually by the NCAA to outstanding former student-athletes on the 25th anniversary of the end of their college sports careers. The award is based on both athletic and professional success.

== Personal life ==
He was an adherent of the Baháʼí Faith, utilizing its teachings and principles to perform acts of service, promote education and value for culture, and engage in community-outreach endeavors.
