= Quentin Riggins =

American gridiron football player (born 1966)

No. 76
- Position: Linebacker

Personal information
- Born: April 14, 1966 (age 60); Montgomery, Alabama, U.S.
- Listed height: 5 ft 11 in (1.80 m)
- Listed weight: 210 lb (95 kg)

Career information
- High school: Robert E. Lee (Montgomery)
- College: Auburn

Career history
- 1990: Winnipeg Blue Bombers
- 1991: Raleigh-Durham Skyhawks

Awards and highlights
- Grey Cup champion (1990); 2× First-team All-SEC (1988, 1989)

Quentin P. Riggins (born April 14, 1966) is an American former professional football linebacker who played one season with the Winnipeg Blue Bombers of the Canadian Football League (CFL). He played college football at Auburn University. He was also a member of the Raleigh-Durham Skyhawks of the World League of American Football (WLAF).

== Early life ==
Riggins played high school football at Robert E. Lee High School in Montgomery, Alabama. He was initially a tailback before converted to linebacker. He helped the Generals reach the quarterfinals his senior season before losing to eventual state champion Northview. Riggins earned all-state honors while also playing fullback and handling kickoff duties for the Generals.

== College career ==
Riggins played for the Auburn Tigers from 1986 to 1989. He was team captain his senior year in 1989 and helped the Tigers win three consecutive SEC championships his final three seasons. He earned second-team All-American and first-team All-SEC honors in 1988 and 1989. Riggins also recorded totals of 398 tackles (200 solo, 198 assists) during his college career. He was named to the SEC Football Legends Class of 2009.

== Professional career ==
Riggins signed with the CFL's Winnipeg Blue Bombers in June 1990. He played for the Blue Bombers during the 1990 season, winning the 78th Grey Cup. He played for the Raleigh-Durham Skyhawks of the WLAF in 1991.

== Broadcasting career ==
Riggins has covered Auburn Tigers football on the radio as a sideline reporter for the Auburn IMG Sports Network since 1991.

== Personal life ==
In 2011, Riggins became the vice president of government relations for Alabama Power.
