= Jon Carter (American football) =

American football player (born 1965)

No. 72, 75
- Positions: Defensive tackle, defensive end

Personal information
- Born: March 12, 1965 (age 61); Los Angeles, California, U.S.
- Listed height: 6 ft 4 in (1.93 m)
- Listed weight: 273 lb (124 kg)

Career information
- High school: Varnado (Varnado, Louisiana)
- College: Pittsburgh
- NFL draft: 1988: 5th round, 118th overall pick

Career history
- New York Giants (1988); Dallas Cowboys (1989); Raleigh–Durham Skyhawks (1991); Frankfurt Galaxy (1992)

Career NFL statistics
- Games played: 13
- Stats at Pro Football Reference

Jon Stacy Carter (born March 12, 1965) is an American former professional football player who was a defensive lineman in the National Football League (NFL) for the Dallas Cowboys. He also was a member of the Raleigh–Durham Skyhawks and Frankfurt Galaxy in the World League of American Football (WLAF). He played college football for the Pittsburgh Panthers.

== Early life ==
Carter attended Varnado High School in Varnado, Louisiana, where he twice received All-state honors at tight end and defensive end. He also practiced basketball and track.

He accepted a football scholarship from the University of Pittsburgh, where he was initially switched to defensive tackle. He became a four-year starter on defensive lines that included Chris Doleman, Bob Buczkowski, Tony Woods, Lorenzo Freeman, Burt Grossman, Marc Spindler, Tony Siragusa and Tom Sims.

He was moved to defensive end as a junior, registering 42 tackles and 6 sacks.

As a senior he was named a team captain, recording 65 tackles (16 for loss), 6 sacks and 2 blocked kicks. He began the season at defensive end, but was forced to play 4 games at defensive tackle due to injuries. During his college career he played every position on the defensive line, finishing with 171 tackles, 41 tackles for loss and 18.5 sacks.

== Professional career ==
=== New York Giants ===
Carter was selected by the New York Giants in the fifth round (118th overall) of the 1988 NFL draft. On September 5, he was placed on the injured reserve list after injuring his hamstring, in the final preseason game against the Cleveland Browns. He was waived on August 28, 1989.

=== Dallas Cowboys ===
On August 29, 1989, he was claimed off waivers by the Dallas Cowboys. On September 5, he was cut and later signed to the practice squad the next day.

That season the Cowboys were constantly bringing players to improve the team's talent level and Carter was promoted to the active roster on September 22. He appeared in 13 games as a backup defensive end and defensive tackle. Against the New York Giants, he had 5 tackles and one pass deflection. Against the Green Bay Packers, he tallied 4 tackles and caused a fumble that was returned by linebacker Jack Del Rio for a 57-yard touchdown. He finished the season with 19 tackles, 2 pass deflections and one forced fumble. He was released on August 28, 1990.

=== Raleigh–Durham Skyhawks ===
In 1991, he was selected 8th overall by the Raleigh–Durham Skyhawks of the World League of American Football. He played defensive end in the Skyhawks' 3–4 defense, while posting 45 tackles, 2.5 sacks, 5 quarterback hurries and one forced fumble. The team finished 0-10 in the standings and were disbanded after the season, due to poor attendance.

=== Frankfurt Galaxy ===
In 1992, he was placed back in the draft pool, along with the remaining Skyhawks players. He was selected in the second round by the Frankfurt Galaxy and was named the starter at defensive end in the team's 3–4 defense.
