= 1991 Barcelona Dragons season =

World League of American Football team season

1991 Barcelona Dragons (NFL Europe) season
- General manager: Andrew Brandt
- Head coach: Jack Bicknell
- Home stadium: Estadi Olímpic de Montjuïc

Results
- Record: 8–2
- Division place: 2nd European Division
- Playoffs: Lost World Bowl '91

The 1991 Barcelona Dragons season was the inaugural season for the franchise in the newly created World League of American Football (WLAF). The team was led by head coach Jack Bicknell, and played its home games at Estadi Olímpic de Montjuïc in Barcelona, Catalonia, Spain. The three European teams had dominated the North American ones, and in week 9, Barcelona had lost to Frankfurt Galaxy, which had both teams tied at 7-2 for the wild card spot, with Frankfurt having the tie breaker advantage, and Barcelona still having to face the unbeaten London Monarchs. Galaxy lost their last game, though, which gave Barcelona the chance to win the wildcard by beating the Monarchs in Wembley. Which they did, to the surprise of Frankfurt, less so to the surprise of London.

Thus, the Dragons finished the regular season in second place of the European Division with a record of eight wins and two losses. In the postseason, the Dragons beat the Birmingham Fire in the semifinals before losing to the London Monarchs in a World Bowl '91 shut-out, again at Wembley.

== Staff ==
1991 Barcelona Dragons staff
Front office: General Manager – Andrew Brandt; Director of Player Personnel – Terry McDonough; Head coaches: Head Coach – Jack Bicknell; Offensive coaches: Offensive Coordinator/Quarterbacks/Receivers – Dick Curl; Offensive Line – Vince Martino	Defensive coaches: Defensive Coordinator/Linebackers – Red Kelin; Defensive Line – Scott Lustig; Defensive Backs – Vaughn Williams

== Roster ==
1991 Barcelona Dragons final roster
Quarterbacks: 6 Scott Erney; 2 Wayne Johnson; 4 Tony Rice; Running backs: 22 Jim Bell; 44 Lydell Carr; 23 Joe Henderson; 26 Paul Palmer; Wide receivers: 83 Marcus Cherry; 82 Tyler Egerton; 84 Dempsey Norman; 80 Gene Taylor; 85 Thomas Woods; Tight ends: 88 Demetrius Davis; 86 Mike Hinnant	Offensive linemen: 72 Scott Adams T; 66 Rick Apolskis G; 63 John Brandom C; 77 Jeff Mickel T; 57 Curt Mull G; 70 Jeff Oliver C; 52 Bobby Sign C; 60 Barry Voorhees G; Defensive linemen: 61 Steve Alvord DE; 75 Bruce Clark DE; 92 Jerry Reese DE/NT; 62 Mike Ruth NT; 96 Brent White DE	Linebackers: 59 John El-Masry ILB; 56 Ron Goetz ILB; 53 Todd Howard ILB; 50 Eric Lindstrom OLB; 91 Eric Naposki OLB; 55 Brad Quast ILB; Defensive backs: 27 Glenn Cobb SS; 29 Charles Fryar CB; 23 Tim Jackson FS; 21 A. J. Greene CB; 20 Adrian Jones CB; 30 Thomas King FS; 25 Alex Morris S/CB; Special teams: 12 Louie Aguiar P; 10 Massimo Manca K	Operation Discovery: 35 (Spain) Guillermo Gomez RB; 46 (Suriname) Rick Koulen CB; 89 (Spain) Xisco Marcos WR; 78 (England) Mark Pearce DE; 33 (Netherlands) Frank Temming RB; Rookies in italics

== Schedule ==
Week	Date	Kickoff	Opponent	Results		Game site	Attendance	Source
Week	Date	Kickoff	Opponent	Final score	Team record	Game site	Attendance	Source
1	Sunday, March 24	7:00 p.m.	New York/New Jersey Knights	W 19–7	1–0	Montjuic Stadium	19,223	
2	Monday, April 1	8:00 p.m.	at Montreal Machine	W 34–10	2–0	Olympic Stadium	53,238	
3	Saturday, April 6	8:00 p.m.	at Raleigh–Durham Skyhawks	W 26–14	3–0	Carter–Finley Stadium	17,900	
4	Sunday, April 14	7:00 p.m.	Orlando Thunder	W 33–13	4–0	Montjuic Stadium	40,875	
5	Saturday, April 20	7:00 p.m.	at San Antonio Riders	L 14–22	4–1	Alamo Stadium	16,500	
6	Saturday, April 27	5:00 p.m.	at Sacramento Surge	W 29–20 ^{OT}	5–1	Hughes Stadium	19,045	
7	Saturday, May 4	8:00 p.m.	Birmingham Fire	W 11–6	6–1	Montjuic Stadium	31,490	
8	Saturday, May 11	8:00 p.m.	San Antonio Riders	W 17–7	7–1	Montjuic Stadium	23,670	
9	Sunday, May 19	3:00 p.m.	Frankfurt Galaxy	L 3–10	7–2	Montjuic Stadium	29,753	
10	Monday, May 27	6:00 p.m.	at London Monarchs	W 20–17	8–2	Wembley Stadium	50,835	
Postseason
Semifinal	Sunday, June 1	7:00 p.m.	at Birmingham Fire	W 10–3	9–2	Legion Field	40,500	
World Bowl	Sunday, June 9	5:30 p.m.	at London Monarchs	L 0–21	9–3	Wembley Stadium	61,108	

== Standings ==
European Division
Team	W	L	T	PCT	PF	PA	DIV	STK
London Monarchs	9	1	0	.900	310	121	1–1	L1
Barcelona Dragons	8	2	0	.800	206	126	1–1	W1
Frankfurt Galaxy	7	3	0	.700	155	139	1–1	L1

== Game summaries ==
=== Week 10: at London Monarchs ===
Week Ten: Barcelona Dragons at London Monarchs – Game summary

Quarter	1	2	3	4	Total
Barcelona	10	0	7	3	20
London	0	3	0	14	17

at Wembley Stadium, Wembley, England

- Date: Monday, May 27
- Game time: 6:00 p.m. BST
- Game attendance: 50,835

=== World Bowl '91: vs London Monarchs ===
World Bowl '91: Barcelona Dragons vs London Monarchs – Game summary

Quarter	1	2	3	4	Total
Barcelona	0	0	0	0	0
London	7	14	0	0	21

at Wembley Stadium, Wembley, England

- Date: Sunday, June 9
- Game time: 5:30 p.m. BST
- Game attendance: 61,108

== Awards ==
After the completion of the regular season, the All-World League team was selected by the league's ten head coaches. Overall, Barcelona had six players selected, with two on the first team and four on the second team. The five selections were:

- Scott Adams, tackle (second team)
- Bruce Clark, defensive end (first team)
- Scott Erney, quarterback (second team)
- Ron Goetz, inside linebacker (second team)
- Gene Taylor, wide receiver (first team)
- Barry Voorhees, guard (second team)
