= John Brantley (linebacker) =

American football player (born 1965)

No. 58, 54, 59
- Position: Linebacker

Personal information
- Born: October 23, 1965 (age 61); Ocala, Florida, U.S.
- Listed height: 6 ft 2 in (1.88 m)
- Listed weight: 236 lb (107 kg)

Career information
- High school: Wildwood (Wildwood, Florida)
- College: Georgia
- NFL draft: 1988: 12th round, 325th overall pick

Career history
- Houston Oilers (1988)*; Houston Oilers (1989); Phoenix Cardinals (1991)*; Birmingham Fire (1991-1992); Washington Redskins (1992–1993)
- * Offseason or practice squad member only

Awards and highlights
- First-team All-SEC (1987); Second-team All-SEC (1986); Florida–Georgia Hall of Fame

Career NFL statistics
- Fumble recoveries: 1
- Stats at Pro Football Reference

John Phillip Brantley Jr. (born October 23, 1965) is an American former professional football player who was a linebacker in the National Football League (NFL) for the Houston Oilers and Washington Redskins. He played college football for the Georgia Bulldogs and was selected 325th overall in the 12th round of the 1988 NFL draft.

Pre-draft measurables
Height	Weight	Hand span	40-yard dash	10-yard split	20-yard split	20-yard shuttle	Vertical jump	Broad jump	Bench press
6 ft 1 7/8 in (1.88 m)	229 lb (104 kg)	10 3/4 in (0.27 m)	4.83 s	1.73 s	2.83 s	4.51 s	30.0 in (0.76 m)	8 ft 10 in (2.69 m)	22 reps
All values from NFL Combine
