= 1991 Frankfurt Galaxy season =

World League of American Football team season

- Owner: World League
- General manager: Oliver Luck
- Head coach: Jack Elway
- Home stadium: Waldstadion

Results
- Record: 7–3
- Division place: 3rd European Division
- Playoffs: Did not qualify

The 1991 Frankfurt Galaxy season was the inaugural season for the franchise in the newly created World League of American Football (WLAF). The team was led by head coach Jack Elway, and played its home games at Waldstadion in Frankfurt, Germany. They finished the ten game season with a record of seven wins and three losses, the third best record in the league well ahead of some 5–5 teams, but also third place in the dominant European Division, so no play-off berth for Frankfurt while the other two Euro teams advanced to the World Bowl.

== Staff ==
1991 Frankfurt Galaxy staff
Front office: General Manager – Oliver Luck; Assistant General Manager – John Workman; Head coaches: Head Coach/Quarterbacks – Jack Elway; Offensive coaches: Offensive Coordinator/Offensive Line – Bob Beers; Running Backs/Tight Ends – Joe Burke; Wide Receivers – Tony Adams	Defensive coaches: Defensive Coordinator/Linebackers – Claude Gilbert; Defensive Line – Dan Geyer; Defensive Backs – Kevin Clark

== Roster ==
1991 Frankfurt Galaxy final roster
Quarterbacks: 14 Alex Espinoza; 17 Mike McCarthy; 11 Mike Perez; Running backs: 33 Tony Baker; 25 Steve Bartalo; 45 Harry Jackson; Wide receivers: 82 Keith Craig; 88 Cedric Gordon; 85 Jason Johnson; 89 Alvin Lee; 86 Craig Morton; Tight ends: 81 Chad Fortune; 80 Todd Young	Offensive linemen: 63 David Diaz-Infante C; 65 Garry Frank G; 75 Ken Hackemack T; 60 Rod Mounts G; 67 Billy Poe G; 58 Eric Still T; Defensive linemen: 78 Kevin Hendrix DE; 62 Ray Huckestein NT; 90 Lee Jones DE; 72 Mark Mraz DE; 76 Mike Teeter NT/DE; 96 Chris Williams NT	Linebackers: 53 Chris Alexander OLB; 59 Terry Fleming ILB; 54 Todd Gatlin OLB; 55 Pat Moorer ILB; 57 Yepi Pauu ILB; 50 Kevin Wolfolk OLB; Defensive backs: 46 Tim Broady SS; 20 Lonnie Finch CB; 28 Joe Greenwood CB/S; 40 Keith McCoy CB; 31 Charles McCree CB; 22 Mark Seals FS; 27 Cedric Stallworth CB; Special teams: 1 Tom Whelihan P/K	Operation Discovery: 70 (West Germany) Olaf Hampel NT; 9 (West Germany) Stephan Maslo K; 77 (West Germany) Gerald Olszewski G; Rookies in italics

== Schedule ==
Week	Date	Kickoff (Note: All times local to where the game was played.)	Opponent	Results		Game site	Attendance	Source
Week	Date	Kickoff	Opponent	Final score	Team record	Game site	Attendance	Source
1	Saturday, March 23	8:00 p.m.	London Monarchs	L 11–24	0–1	Waldstadion	23,169	
2	Monday, April 1	7:00 p.m.	at San Antonio Riders	W 10–3	1–1	Alamo Stadium	18,432	
3	Saturday, April 6	8:00 p.m.	at New York/New Jersey Knights	W 27–17	2–1	Giants Stadium	36,549	
4	Saturday, April 13	5:00 p.m.	at Sacramento Surge	L 10–16	2–2	Hughes Stadium	17,065	
5	Saturday, April 20	8:00 p.m.	Raleigh–Durham Skyhawks	W 30–28	3–2	Waldstadion	21,065	
6	Saturday, April 27	8:00 p.m.	Montreal Machine	W 17–7	4–2	Waldstadion	25,269	
7	Saturday, May 4	8:00 p.m.	at Orlando Thunder	W 17–14	5–2	Florida Citrus Bowl	11,270	
8	Sunday, May 12	7:00 p.m.	Birmingham Fire	W 10–3	6–2	Waldstadion	28,127	
9	Sunday, May 19	3:00 p.m.	at Barcelona Dragons	W 10–3	7–2	Montjuic Stadium	29,753	
10	Saturday, May 25	8:00 p.m.	Sacramento Surge	L 13–24	7–3	Waldstadion	51,653	

== Standings ==
European Division
Team	W	L	T	PCT	PF	PA	DIV	STK
London Monarchs	9	1	0	.900	310	121	1–1	L1
Barcelona Dragons	8	2	0	.800	206	126	1–1	W1
Frankfurt Galaxy	7	3	0	.700	155	139	1–1	L1

== Game summaries ==
=== Week 1: vs London Monarchs ===
Week One: London Monarchs at Frankfurt Galaxy – Game summary

Quarter	1	2	3	4	Total
London	0	7	17	0	24
Frankfurt	2	3	0	6	11

at Waldstadion, Frankfurt, Germany

- Date: Saturday, March 23
- Game time: 8:00 p.m. CET
- Game attendance: 23,169
- Referee: Stan Kemp

=== Week 6: vs Montreal Machine ===
Week Six: Montreal Machine at Frankfurt Galaxy – Game summary

Quarter	1	2	3	4	Total
Montreal	0	0	0	7	7
Frankfurt	0	7	7	3	17

at Waldstadion, Frankfurt, Germany

- Date: Saturday, April 27
- Game time: 8:00 p.m. CEST
- Game attendance: 25,269
- Referee: Stan Kemp

== Awards ==
After the completion of the regular season, the All-World League team was selected by the league's ten head coaches. Overall, Frankfurt had five players selected, with three on the first team and two on the second team. The five selections were:

- Tony Baker, running back (first team)
- Tim Broady, strong safety (second team)
- Garry Frank, guard (first team)
- Mark Mraz, defensive end (first team)
- Mike Teeter, nose tackle (second team)
