= Brent Pease =

American football player and coach (born 1964)

Current position
- Title: Offensive coordinator, quarterbacks coach
- Team: Montana
- Conference: Big Sky

Biographical details
- Born: October 8, 1964 (age 62); Moscow, Idaho, U.S.
- Education: Montana

Playing career
- 1983–1986: Montana
- 1987*: Minnesota Vikings
- 1987–1988: Houston Oilers
- 1989*: Miami Dolphins
- 1990*: Chicago Bears
- 1991: Birmingham Fire
- 1992: New York/New Jersey Knights
- 1993: Cincinnati Rockers
- Position: Quarterback

Coaching career (HC unless noted)
- 1991–1995: Montana (off. asst.)
- 1996–1998: Montana (OC)
- 1999–2000: Northern Arizona (OC/QB)
- 2001–2002: Kentucky (AHC/OC/QB)
- 2003–2005: Baylor (OC/QB)
- 2006: Boise State (WR)
- 2007–2010: Boise State (AHC/WR)
- 2011: Boise State (OC/QB)
- 2012–2013: Florida (OC/QB)
- 2014–2015: Washington (WR)
- 2016–2017: UTEP (OC/QB)
- 2018–2022: Montana (AHC/WR)
- 2023–present: Montana (OC/QB)

Brent Richard Pease (born October 8, 1964) is an American football coach and former player. He was hired in 2018 at the University of Montana as the Offensive coordinator and quarterback coach. He was previously the offensive coordinator at UTEP, the wide receivers coach at the University of Washington and the offensive coordinator and quarterbacks coach for the University of Florida.

== Playing career ==
Born in Moscow, Idaho, Pease grew up in Mountain Home and played quarterback at Mountain Home High School, where his father Rich was head coach. After graduation in 1983, he enrolled at Walla Walla Community College, a junior college in Washington. Pease played in only two games during his freshman season, before becoming the Warriors' starting quarterback as a sophomore in 1984. Pease transferred to the University of Montana in 1985, and became the starting quarterback as a senior in 1986.

Pease was drafted by the Minnesota Vikings in the eleventh round of the 1987 NFL draft. He was released and picked up by the Houston Oilers, for whom he started three replacement games during the strike-shortened 1987 season. He spent another year in Houston as a third-stringer behind Warren Moon and his back-up Cody Carlson.

In February 1991, Pease became the first quarterback selected in the World League of American Football draft by the Birmingham Fire. After spending the 1991 season as a part-time starter for the Fire, Pease spent 1992 as the backup to Reggie Slack for the New York/New Jersey Knights. Behind Pease as the no. 3 quarterback was future NFL backup Doug Pederson.

== Coaching career ==
Pease began his coaching career while still playing in the World League as an offensive assistant coach at his alma mater, Montana, in the fall of 1991. He spent five seasons coaching quarterbacks, running backs and wide receivers. In 1995, the Grizzlies won the NCAA Division I-AA championship and quarterback Dave Dickenson, tutored by Pease, received the Walter Payton Award and earned Big Sky Conference MVP honors. The following year, new head coach Mick Dennehy promoted him to offensive coordinator, a position he held for three seasons. He left Montana in 1999, joining Jerome Souers' staff at Northern Arizona as the assistant head coach, offensive coordinator and quarterbacks coach.

Pease was offensive coordinator at Kentucky under head coach Guy Morriss from 2001 through 2002. While at Kentucky, Pease coached future NFL quarterbacks Jared Lorenzen and Shane Boyd. He then served as the offensive coordinator at Baylor under Morriss from 2003 to 2005.

In 2006, Pease became wide receivers coach at Boise State, adding the title of assistant head coach the following year. In December 2010, Pease was named offensive coordinator at Indiana University. However, he returned to Boise less than two weeks later, succeeding Bryan Harsin as the Broncos' offensive coordinator.

Following the 2011 season, Pease was hired by Florida as their new offensive coordinator and quarterbacks coach. Following the 2013 season, and a 37–7 loss to Florida State, Pease and UF parted ways.

On December 17, 2013, Pease was hired by Chris Petersen at the University of Washington to be the wide receivers coach. Pease was fired on December 4, 2015.

On January 14, 2016, Pease was named offensive coordinator at UTEP. During his first season, the Miners went 4–8, 2–6 in C-USA play to finish in a tie for fifth place in the West Division. In the first three games of the 2017 season, UTEP's offense ranked 128th out of 129 teams in the FBS in total offense, 124th in scoring offense, 129th in rushing offense and 129th in first downs per game. On September 17, 2017, Pease was fired after an 0–3 start to the season.

Pease returned to his alma mater, the University of Montana, in 2018 as the wide receivers coach. After the 2022 season Pease was promoted to Offensive Coordinator and Assistant Head Coach. Under Pease's guidance the Montana offense had the FCS freshman of the year in Eli Gillman and the Big Sky Newcomer of the Year with quarterback Clifton McDowell.
