= Steve Avery (American football) =

American football player (born 1966)

No. 42, 26, 32, 43
- Position: Running back

Personal information
- Born: August 18, 1966 (age 60); Milwaukee, Wisconsin, U.S.
- Listed height: 6 ft 2 in (1.88 m)
- Listed weight: 233 lb (106 kg)

Career information
- High school: Brookfield Central (Brookfield, Wisconsin)
- College: Northern Michigan
- NFL draft: 1989: undrafted

Career history
- Houston Oilers (1989); Kansas City Chiefs (1989)*; Green Bay Packers (1990)*; Pittsburgh Steelers (1991)*; Green Bay Packers (1991); → Birmingham Fire (1991-1992); Pittsburgh Steelers (1993–1995); San Francisco 49ers (1997)*
- * Offseason or practice squad member only

Career NFL statistics
- Receptions: 12
- Receiving yards: 84
- Touchdowns: 1
- Stats at Pro Football Reference

Steven George Avery (born August 18, 1966) is an American former professional football player who was a running back in the National Football League (NFL). He was signed by the Houston Oilers as an undrafted rookie free agent in 1989. He played college football for the Northern Michigan Wildcats. He also played for the Green Bay Packers and Pittsburgh Steelers in addition to the Birmingham Fire of the World League of American Football (WLAF).

== Early life ==
Avery was born in Milwaukee and attended Brookfield Central High School in Brookfield, Wisconsin. He then attended Northern Michigan University.

== Professional career ==
After going undrafted in the 1989 NFL draft, Avery was signed by the Houston Oilers where he spent one season, appearing in one game. After not playing in 1990, he was signed by the Green Bay Packers where he again appeared in one game. He again spent a season not playing in 1992. In 1993, he signed with the Pittsburgh Steelers where he would play for three seasons. In 1994, he appeared in 14 games with one start and recorded two carries for four yards and one reception for two yards. In 1995, his final season as a professional, Avery appeared in 11 games with two starts and recorded one carry for three yards and 11 receptions for 82 yards and one touchdown.
