= Willie Bouyer =

American football player (born 1966)

No. 88
- Position: Wide receiver

Personal information
- Born: September 24, 1966 (age 60); Detroit, Michigan, U.S.
- Listed height: 6 ft 3 in (1.91 m)
- Listed weight: 200 lb (91 kg)

Career information
- High school: Chadsey (Detroit)
- College: Michigan State
- NFL draft: 1989: undrafted

Career history
- Seattle Seahawks (1989–1990); Birmingham Fire (1991–1992); Philadelphia Eagles (1992); Sacramento Gold Miners (1993–1994)
- Stats at Pro Football Reference

Willie Bouyer (born September 24, 1966) is an American former professional football player who was a wide receiver for the Seattle Seahawks of the National Football League (NFL). He played college football for the Michigan State Spartans. He played for the Seahawks in 1989, the Birmingham Fire of the World League of American Football (WLAF) from 1991 to 1992 and for the Sacramento Gold Miners of the Canadian Football League (CFL) from 1993 to 1994.

Pre-draft measurables
Height	Weight	40-yard dash	10-yard split	20-yard split	20-yard shuttle	Vertical jump
6 ft 2 1/8 in (1.88 m)	197 lb (89 kg)	4.64 s	1.59 s	2.73 s	4.34 s	34.0 in (0.86 m)
All values from NFL Combine
