= Raleigh–Durham Skyhawks =

World League of American Football team

Logo

General information
- Inaugural season: 1991
- Folded: 1991
- Stadium: Carter–Finley Stadium
- Headquartered: Raleigh, North Carolina, U.S.
- Colors: Red, Kelly Green, Black, White

Personnel
- Owner: George Shinn
- Head coach: Roman Gabriel

League / conference affiliations
- World League of American Football (NFL Europe)

The Raleigh–Durham Skyhawks were an American football team headquartered in Raleigh, North Carolina that played for one season in 1991 in the World League of American Football (WLAF). The name was inspired by the Wright brothers' flights on the Outer Banks of North Carolina. The three jet-trails and three planes in flight, as well as the triangle design in the logo, represented the three points of the Research Triangle area (Raleigh, Durham, and Chapel Hill). The team's cheerleaders were known as the "Kittyhawks." The team had three official mascots. One was the Skyhawk jersey wearing bird, the other two were Orville (Craig Lloyd) and Wilbur Wright costumed characters.

The name was chosen by Raleigh citizens, the choices being the Skyhawks, Daredevils, or Rogues as published in the News and Observer. The Skyhawks' home field was N.C. State's Carter–Finley Stadium in Raleigh. Then-Charlotte Hornets owner George Shinn owned the franchise, and the head coach was former NFL player and NC State alumnus Roman Gabriel.

The team had a 0–10 record in the 1991 season and averaged 12,066 spectators per game due in part to the lack of beer sales, which were not allowed at (technically) on-campus Carter–Finley Stadium. During the 1991 season, the three Europe-based teams dominated the franchises in North America. In mid-season, the Skyhawks came close to beating the Frankfurt Galaxy in Germany, but lost 30–28 to a team that was coached by Jack Elway and finished the season 7–3, considered by some as the league's second best. The Skyhawks folded after their lone season of 1991. To replace them for the 1992 season, the WLAF established a new franchise in Columbus, Ohio, naming it the Ohio Glory. After a two year hiatus, the league resumed in 1995 with new focus as NFL Europe.

The Skyhawks' lack of success did not sour the NFL on the whole state, as in 1995, Charlotte welcomed the expansion Carolina Panthers franchise. Professional sports would return to the Triangle area eight years later when the Carolina Hurricanes of the NHL moved there from Greensboro, North Carolina to play ice hockey in their newly constructed arena.

== Season-by-season ==
Season	League	Regular season					Postseason			
Season	League	Won	Lost	Ties	Win %	Finish	Won	Lost	Win %	Result
1991	WLAF	0	10	0	.000	4th (North American East)	–	–	—	—
Total		0	10	0	.000		–	–	—	

== Staff ==
1991 Raleigh–Durham Skyhawks staff
Front office: Owner – George Shinn; Vice President/Administration – Wayne Thompson; Director of Player Personnel – Ernie Driscoll; Head coaches: Head Coach/Director of Football Operations – Roman Gabriel; Offensive coaches: Offensive Coordinator/Running Backs – Johnnie Walton; Receivers/Special Teams – Jim Popp; Offensive Line – Buck Fowler	Defensive coaches: Defensive Coordinator/Linebackers – Doug Kay; Defensive Line – Claude Humphrey; Mascot – Craig Lloyd; Secondary/Special Teams – Charlie Harbison

== Roster ==
1991 Raleigh–Durham Skyhawks final roster
Quarterbacks: 14 Mark Maye; 11 Bobby McAllister; 6 Joe Pizzo; Running backs: 21 John Burch; 28 Sean Doctor; 30 Bren Lowery; 20 Darryl McGill; Wide receivers: 80 Marvin Hargrove; 84 Clarkston Hines; 89 Andre Johnson; 86 Melvin Patterson; 82 Clarence Seay; Tight ends: 81 Joe Meerten; 85 Kevin Sprinkles	Offensive linemen: 64 Terry Gray G; 78 Brad Henke G/T; 72 Kelly John-Lewis T; 60 Jason Kuipers G; 51 Wood Myers T/G; 68 Ruffin Rodrigue G; 74 Michael Scott T; 71 Robert Stallings T; 53 Paul Wulff C; Defensive linemen: 73 David Ammons NT; 97 Webbie Burnett NT; 94 Anthony Butts DE/NT; 75 Jon Carter DE; 77 Erwin Grabisna DE; 95 Tony Gunn DE; 70 Marquet Miller DE	Linebackers: 52 Ezekial Gadson; 61 Steve Glasson; 56 Quentin Riggins; 96 Troy Stedman; 98 Rafe Wilkinson; 59 Shawn Woodson; Defensive backs: 42 Eric Hickson SS; 47 Ray Jackson FS/SS; 29 Gerald Mack CB/FS; 26 Pat McGuirk CB; 23 Brian McPhatter SS; 31 Peda Samuel CB; Special teams: 7 Troy Faunce P; 3 Wilson Hoyle K	Operation Discovery: 22 (Norway) Nicolay Aslaksen RB; 1 (Australia) Peter Busch P; 55 (Soviet Union) Vladimir Gerogiev LB; 92 (Soviet Union) Oleg Sapego DE; Rookies in italics

== Schedule ==
Week	Date	Kickoff	Opponent	Result	Record	Venue	Attendance	Source
1	March 23	4:00 p.m.	at Sacramento Surge	L 3–9	0–1	Hughes Stadium	15,126	
2	March 30	8:00 p.m.	at Orlando Thunder	L 20–58	0–2	Florida Citrus Bowl	20,811	
3	April 6	8:00 p.m.	Barcelona Dragons	L 14–26	0–3	Carter–Finley Stadium	17,900	
4	April 15	8:00 p.m.	San Antonio Riders	L 15–37	0–4	Carter–Finley Stadium	11,818	
5	April 20	8:00 p.m.	at Frankfurt Galaxy	L 28–30	0–5	Waldstadion	21,065	
6	April 28	6:00 p.m.	at London Monarchs	L 10–35	0–6	Wembley Stadium	33,997	
7	May 5	1:00 p.m.	New York/New Jersey Knights	L 6–42	0–7	Carter–Finley Stadium	10,069	
8	May 13	8:00 p.m.	at Montreal Machine	L 6–15	0–8	Olympic Stadium	20,123	
9	May 20	8:00 p.m.	Orlando Thunder	L 14–20	0–9	Carter–Finley Stadium	4,207	
10	May 25	3:00 p.m.	Birmingham Fire	L 7–28	0–10	Carter–Finley Stadium	16,335	
