= Chris Williams (defensive lineman, born 1968) =

American football player (born 1968)

No. 96, 78
- Position: Defensive lineman

Personal information
- Born: November 23, 1968 (age 57); Chelsea, Massachusetts, U.S.
- Listed height: 6 ft 3 in (1.91 m)
- Listed weight: 304 lb (138 kg)

Career information
- High school: Southeastern Regional Vocational Technical (Easton, Massachusetts)
- College: American International
- NFL draft: 1990: undrafted

Career history
- New England Patriots (1990)*; Frankfurt Galaxy (1991); Phoenix Cardinals (1991); Buffalo Bills (1992)*
- * Offseason or practice squad member only
- Stats at Pro Football Reference

Chris Williams (born November 23, 1968) is an American former professional football defensive lineman who played for the Phoenix Cardinals of the National Football League (NFL). He played college football for the American International Yellow Jackets.

== Early life ==
Chris Williams was born on November 23, 1968, in Chelsea, Massachusetts. He attended Southeastern Regional Vocational Technical in Easton, Massachusetts.

== College career ==
Williams enrolled at American International College to play college football for the Yellow Jackets. He was a member of the team from 1986 to 1989. He graduated from American International in 1990.

== Professional career ==
After going undrafted in the 1990 NFL draft, Williams signed with the New England Patriots on April 26, 2002. He was waived on August 28, 1990, before the fourth preseason game.

Williams played in all ten games, starting two, for the Frankfurt Galaxy of the World League of American Football (WLAF) during the 1991 WLAF season. He scored the first points in league history, tackling London Monarchs running back Judd Garrett in the endzone for a safety on March 23, 1991. Williams finished the season with 23 tackles, 6.5 sacks, and one pass breakup.

Williams signed with the Phoenix Cardinals on June 1, 1991. He played in 15 games for the Cardinals during the 1991 NFL season as a reserve nose guard. He became a free agent after the season.

Williams was signed by the Buffalo Bills on March 31, 1992. He was released on August 18, 1992, after the second preseason game.
