= Elroy Harris =

American football player (born 1966)

No. 33, 22, 31, 34
- Position: Running back

Personal information
- Born: August 18, 1966 (age 60); Orlando, Florida, U.S.
- Listed height: 5 ft 9 in (1.75 m)
- Listed weight: 218 lb (99 kg)

Career information
- High school: Winter Park (FL)
- College: Eastern Kentucky
- NFL draft: 1989: 3rd round, 71st overall pick

Career history
- Seattle Seahawks (1989); Montreal Machine (1991); Birmingham Fire (1991–1992)

Career NFL statistics
- Rushing yards: 23
- Rushing average: 2.9
- Receptions: 3
- Receiving yards: 26
- Stats at Pro Football Reference

Elroy Harris (born August 18, 1966) is an American former professional football player who was a running back in the National Football League (NFL). He played for the Seattle Seahawks in 1989, the Montreal Machine in 1991 and for the Birmingham Fire from 1991 to 1992. He was selected by the Seahawks in the third round of the 1989 NFL draft.
