= Birmingham Fire =

World League of American Football team

Logo

General information
- Founded: 1991
- Folded: 1992
- Headquartered: Birmingham, Alabama
- Colors: Navy, Gold, Crimson, White

League / conference affiliations
- World League of American Football (NFL Europe)

The Birmingham Fire were a professional American football team based in Birmingham, Alabama. They were a member of the North American West division of the World League of American Football (WLAF) and played their home games at Legion Field. The club was a charter member of the WLAF, and was under the ownership of Gavin Maloof. Led by head coach Chan Gailey, the Fire saw moderate success as they compiled an overall record of twelve wins, nine losses and one tie (12–9–1) and made the playoffs in both seasons they competed. The franchise folded in September 1992 when the NFL placed the league on an indefinite hiatus.

== Formation ==
In June 1989, WLAF president Tex Schramm and other league officials met with Birmingham leaders to discuss the possibility of fielding a team at Legion Field. At that time Schramm stated that Birmingham was under consideration for a franchise based on its past support of the Americans/Vulcans of the World Football League and the Stallions of the United States Football League. The following July, the National Football League (NFL) owners voted to approve the formation of the WLAF in an effort to expand the sport outside of the United States. At the time of the announcement the league was envisioned to have twelve teams with London, Frankfurt, Barcelona, Milan, New York City, Montreal, Mexico City and Northern California as being already selected for franchises. Birmingham was identified as a contender for one of the final four franchises along with Nashville, San Antonio and Orlando.

On April 18, 1990, Birmingham became the second city in the United States officially awarded a franchise after the Orlando Thunder to compete in the inaugural WLAF season. At the time of the announcement, Schramm reiterated past support for professional football in Birmingham was a major reason for its selection for a franchise. A group headed by former Houston Rockets president Gavin Maloof was revealed as owners of the Birmingham franchise in November 1990. At that time the league reaffirmed it would begin play in March 1991 with ten teams, and that Birmingham would compete as a member of the North American West division with the Sacramento Surge and the San Antonio Riders. On December 6, Michael Huyghue was introduced as general manager, and at the time of his being hired, he was the first African American general manager of a professional football team. On December 21, 1990, Chan Gailey was introduced as the first head coach of the Fire.

== 1991 season ==
In February 1991, the WLAF held its inaugural draft, and unlike the NFL draft, the WLAF version was carried out with individual positions being drafted over a period of several days. Offensive linemen were drafted on February 14; running backs, punters and placekickers on February 16; quarterbacks, wide receivers and tight ends on February 18; defensive linemen on February 20; linebackers on February 22; and defensive backs on February 24. The most notable player drafted by the Fire was the selection of Brent Pease with the first overall pick in the quarterbacks draft. Training camp started shortly thereafter, and in mid-March the Fire lost to San Antonio in a controlled scrimmage at San Marcos, Texas.

The Fire played their first game on March 23 against the Montreal Machine at Legion Field. Although they lost 20–5, an attendance of over 53,000 resulted in the start of the game being delayed 21 minutes to allow fans into the stadium as only two gates were open at the time. The next week, the Fire won their first game against the Sacramento Surge. The 17–10 win only drew 16,000 spectators, but the featured a 99-yard interception return for a touchdown by John Miller. The team then alternated pairs of wins and losses over their remaining eight regular season games. The first pair of losses came on the road against Montreal and at home against the London Monarchs. In their first all-time road game, Birmingham lost to the Machine 23–10 before 27,766 fans at Olympic Stadium. One week later, they suffered their only shutout of the season in their 27–0 loss against eventual World Bowl champion London. Birmingham then rebounded with a 31–6 road win at the Orlando Thunder and a 16–12 with at home against San Antonio to even their overall record at 3–3.

The Fire then lost both of the games played in Europe, and as a result their record dropped to 3–5. The first loss came against the Barcelona Dragons in an 11–6 defeat and against the Frankfurt Galaxy in their 10–3 loss at the Waldstadion. In their final home game of the season, Birmingham defeated the New York/New Jersey Knights 24–14 to put the team in contention for the last playoff spot as they entered the final week of the regular season. In their regular season finale the Fire defeated the Raleigh–Durham Skyhawks 28–7, and clinched a spot in the first WLAF playoffs as the winners of the North American West division with a 5–5 record. In the WLAF semifinals, Birmingham lost for the second time in the season to Barcelona 10–3 at Legion Field to finish their inaugural season with a final record of 5–6.

In the buildup to their playoff game in the months that followed, the Fire started their effort to host World Bowl '92 at Legion Field. In the formal request for the event, team ownership indicated they were willing to undertake a $12 million renovation of the facility that would increase the seating capacity from 72,000 to 80,000, add luxury skyboxes and a giant TV scoreboard. Ultimately the league awarded the game to Montreal in December 1991. Michael Huyghue resigned as general manager on June 20 to take a position in the WLAF front office.

== 1992 season ==
In December 1991, Rick Nichols was hired from the Houston Oilers to serve as general manager of the Fire. In February 1992, the league held its second annual draft and Birmingham made 29 selection during its two days. In addition to those players drafted, an additional six players were allocated to the Fire from NFL teams that retained their overall rights. By March, the team was again in training camp, but this season had an official preseason game to play against the London Monarchs. In this game, the Fire lost 14–13, and in a first in professional sports the loss could be utilized as a potential tiebreaker in order to determine playoff eligibility.

The Fire opened the season for the second consecutive year with a loss in their opening game by the score of 20-6 at Sacramento. They then rebounded by going undefeated over the four games that followed. After a 17–10 victory in their home opener against San Antonio, Birmingham earned their first all-time win in Europe with a 17–7 win at Frankfurt. The next week, Birmingham tied London 17–17 at Wembley Stadium. The draw was both the first in the history of the World League, and remained as the only one until Berlin and Hamburg battled to a 17–17 tie as part of NFL Europe in 2006. The Fire returned from Europe and defeated Sacramento 28–14 in a rematch of their week one matchup. In week six, Birmingham lost 17–10 on the road to division rival San Antonio before they ended the regular season on a four-game winning streak.

Against Barcelona, the Fire withstood a fourth quarter comeback and defeated the Dragons for the first time in franchise history 19–7. The next week, Birmingham defeated Montreal for the first time and also won their first overtime game with their 23–16 victory over the Machine. A failed two-point conversion gave the Fire a 24–23 victory over Orlando and a comeback, 27–24 victory at the Ohio Glory in the final game of the season allowed Birmingham to qualify for the playoffs as a wild card. In their semifinals appearance, numerous turnovers resulted in a 45–7 defeat at Orlando to finish the season with a record of 7–3–1.

== Season-by-season records ==
Season	League	Regular season					Postseason			
Season	League	Won	Lost	Ties	Win %	Finish	Won	Lost	Win %	Result
1991	WLAF	5	5	0	.500	1st (North American West)	0	1	.000	Lost to Barcelona Dragons in semifinal
1992	WLAF	7	2	1	.750	2nd (North American West)	0	1	.000	Lost to Orlando Thunder in semifinal
Total		12	7	1	.625		0	2	.000	

== Dissolution ==
In August 1992, Maloof sold the franchise back to the league. At that time league officials asked former Green Bay Packers quarterback Bart Starr to help find a new ownership group in Alabama. On September 17, 1992, the NFL decided to place the WLAF on an indefinite hiatus. The owners stated that the decision was made to shutter the league at that time in an effort to save money to settle potential class action lawsuits brought about by players in the wake of Plan B free agency being declared illegal. The NFL stated that when the league was reestablished it would be focused on European markets with no more than one or two teams envisioned for play in the United States.

== Life after the WLAF ==
After the dissolution of the franchise, several of its former coaches and front office personnel moved onto other endeavors. Chan Gailey was named the head coach at Samford University in January 1992 to replace the departed Terry Bowden. When he left to re-enter the NFL after only one season with the Bulldogs, he was replaced by former Fire offensive line coach Pete Hurt. Gailey went on to become the head coach of the Dallas Cowboys, Georgia Tech Yellow Jackets and the Buffalo Bills. Former owner Gavin Maloof joined his brother in the late 1990s to become owners of the National Basketball Association's Sacramento Kings.

In 1995, World League returned after a two-year hiatus, and the Fire nickname was resurrected in Düsseldorf, Germany as the Rhein Fire. Professional football returned to Birmingham in 1995 when the Canadian Football League (CFL) awarded what became the Birmingham Barracudas as part of their CFL USA expansion. The Barracudas only played the one season and folded, and Birmingham's next football team, the XFL's Birmingham Thunderbolts, met the same fate. In 2019, Birmingham served as the home of the now defunct AAF's Birmingham Iron. In 2021, Birmingham became the host city for the resurrected USFL including their local team the Birmingham Stallions.
