= Radovich v. National Football League =

- Supreme Court of the United States

Argued January 17, 1957 Decided February 25, 1957
- Full case name: William Radovich v. National Football League et al.
- Citations: 352 U.S. 445 (more) 77 S. Ct. 390; 1 L. Ed. 2d 456

Case history
- Prior: Summarily dismissed, (S.D. Cal.); affirmed, 231 F.2d 620 (9th Cir. 1956); cert. granted, 352 U.S. 818 (1956).

Holding
- Antitrust exemption for professional baseball is specific to that sport and does not apply to professional football

Court membership
- Chief Justice Earl Warren Associate Justices Hugo Black · Felix Frankfurter; William O. Douglas · Harold H. Burton; Tom C. Clark · John M. Harlan II

Case opinions
- Majority: Clark
- Dissent: Frankfurter
- Dissent: Harlan, joined by Brennan

Laws applied
- Sherman Antitrust Act, U.S. Const. Commerce Clause

Radovich v. National Football League (NFL), 352 U.S. 445 (1957), is a U.S. Supreme Court decision ruling that professional football, unlike professional baseball, was subject to antitrust laws. It was the third of three such cases heard by the Court in the 1950s involving the antitrust status of professional sports.

Three justices dissented, finding the majority arbitrary and inconsistent in refusing football the exemption it had upheld five years previously in Toolson v. New York Yankees (346 U.S. 356 (1952)). The majority admitted that the similarity between the two sports from a legal standpoint would probably have denied baseball the exemption as well were it sought afresh, but existing case law had tied their hands in the absence of any congressional action.

While the NFL has secured some limited antitrust exemptions since through the legislative process, the lack of a blanket exemption due to this decision has had a major impact on the subsequent history of football. Unlike Major League Baseball, the NFL has faced several competing leagues since then (one of which merged with it) and seen five of its franchises move to new cities. Many of these actions have been accompanied by lawsuits brought against the NFL (often successfully) by competing leagues, public stadium-management authorities and its own owners.

== Background of the case ==
In 1938 undrafted University of Southern California graduate William "Bill" Radovich began his NFL career as a guard with the Detroit Lions. He chose to sign with them because they were the only team in the league that guaranteed players an off-season job.

After four seasons, during which he made sportswriters' All-Pro lists, he left to serve in the Navy during World War II. He returned to the Lions after the war ended, in 1945.

The next year, he asked to be traded to the Los Angeles Rams, or be better paid, as his father, who lived near that city, was seriously ill and he wanted to be able to spend more time with him. Lions' owner Fred L. Mandel Jr. refused, saying (according to Radovich) "I'd either play in Detroit or I wouldn't play anywhere". Since his contract had expired, he instead signed with the Los Angeles Dons of the rival All-America Football Conference (AAFC) and played with them for two seasons, despite Mandel's promise to put him on a blacklist for five seasons. In 1948 the San Francisco Clippers of the Pacific Coast Professional Football League (PCPFL), a minor pro football league whose clubs had some affiliations with the NFL, offered him a position as a player and coach. After learning that the NFL had indeed blacklisted Radovich due to his play in the AAFC and would punish any club that did hire him, however, the Clippers withdrew their offer.

Radovich had to take jobs outside of professional football. One was waiting tables at Los Angeles's Brown Derby restaurant. There he met Joseph Alioto, a former antitrust litigator with the Justice Department. In conversation, he told Alioto how he had come to this, and Alioto responded by sketching out a legal brief on the back of a cocktail napkin.

=== NFL–AAFC rivalry ===
The AAFC was an eight-team league that played from 1946–49. Since it emerged at a time when the NFL was just beginning to recover from the war years (when some teams temporarily merged), was national in scope and had owners wealthier than most of their NFL counterparts, it posed a serious competitive threat to the older league. The NFL took many steps to prevent the AAFC from making headway, blacklisting media who had covered the league as well as players who jumped to it.

Ultimately the AAFC collapsed due to the dominance of the Cleveland Browns, who won all four of its championships, and financial problems and instability at some of its weaker franchises. In December 1949 the two leagues merged. The Browns, Baltimore Colts (not related to the team now known as the Indianapolis Colts) and San Francisco 49ers joined the NFL; other teams folded or merged with an existing team.

=== Professional sports and antitrust ===
In Federal Baseball Club v. National League (259 U.S. 200 (1922)), Oliver Wendell Holmes Jr. had written for a unanimous court that Major League Baseball was not covered by the Sherman Antitrust Act because it was not interstate commerce. Travel by teams across state line was "an incident" to the business of staging baseball games, which he described as "purely state affairs". Three decades later Toolson v. New York Yankees upheld that precedent due to congressional inaction to change it, despite changes in the business such as broadcasting deals that made the interstate aspect a much greater part of the commerce.

Toolson's short, per curiam majority opinion concluded that the antitrust exemption applied to baseball only. In United States v. International Boxing Club of New York (348 U.S. 236 (1955)), the Court denied a motion by the appellee to extend it to professional boxing despite the commercial similarities between it and baseball.

== Trial and appeal ==
Radovich and Alioto brought suit under the Clayton Act, which allows private parties to seek damages from unfair business practices, against the NFL, all its member franchises, commissioner Bert Bell, the PCPFL (by then defunct) and its commissioner at the time, J. Rufus Klawans. He alleged he had been the victim of a group boycott intended to ruin the AAFC and sought $35,000 in damages. The defendants, primarily the NFL, argued in a pretrial motion that the antitrust exemption for baseball should apply equally to football, barring the lawsuit, and that even if it did not, it should be dismissed for failure to state a cause of action.

The district court accepted those arguments, as did the Ninth Circuit. The latter distinguished football from boxing, which the Supreme Court had already denied the exemption, by noting that it and baseball were both team sports, unlike boxing.

== Before the Court ==
The federal government, interested in not further restricting the jurisdiction of the Sherman Act, filed an amicus curiae brief on behalf of Radovich, drafted by Solicitor General J. Lee Rankin. Maxwell Keith wrote the petition for certiorari and the briefs before the Court on behalf of Radovich. He made the oral argument along with Rankin. Marshall Leahy and Bernard Nordlinger argued for the NFL.

== Decision ==
Justice Tom C. Clark wrote for the majority; there were no concurring opinions by the other justices. On the other side, Felix Frankfurter wrote an opinion reiterating his dissent in International Boxing Club, and John Marshall Harlan II was joined by new justice William Brennan in another.

=== Majority ===
Clark reiterated that the Court's existing jurisprudence on the issue – Federal Baseball, Toolson and International Boxing – was explicit and clear that the exemption applied to baseball only. "As long as the Congress continues to acquiesce we should adhere to – but not extend – the interpretation of the Act made in those cases", he said. But "the volume of interstate business involved in organized professional football places it within the provisions of the Act." He admitted that this was at odds with the reality, but defended the reliance on a congressional remedy as a better process than a judicial one:

If this ruling is unrealistic, inconsistent, or illogical, it is sufficient to answer, aside from the distinctions between the businesses, that were we considering the question of baseball for the first time upon a clean slate we would have no doubts. But Federal Baseball held the business of baseball outside the scope of the Act. No other business claiming the coverage of those cases has such an adjudication. We, therefore, conclude that the orderly way to eliminate error or discrimination, if any there be, is by legislation and not by court decision. Congressional processes are more accommodative, affording the whole industry hearings and an opportunity to assist in the formulation of new legislation. The resulting product is therefore more likely to protect the industry and the public alike. The whole scope of congressional action would be known long in advance and effective dates for the legislation could be set in the future without the injustices of retroactivity and surprise which might follow court action.

He also found that Radovich had adequately stated a cause of action, dismissing claims of frivolity and vagueness raised by the NFL. Broadcasting revenues were likely, if proven, to be enough of the defendants' business alone to come under the terms of the Sherman Antitrust Act. "This Court should not add requirements to burden the private litigant beyond what is specifically set forth by Congress", he concluded. "We think that Radovich is entitled to an opportunity to prove his charges."

=== Dissents ===
"The most conscientious probing of the text and the interstices of the Sherman Law", wrote Frankfurter, "fails to disclose that Congress, whose will we are enforcing, excluded baseball – the conditions under which that sport is carried on – from the scope of the Sherman Law but included football." He was more concerned, however, with what he felt was undue respect for the doctrine of stare decisis, a concern he had voiced in International Boxing. "Full respect for stare decisis does not require a judge to forgo his own convictions promptly after his brethren have rejected them", he concluded.

Harlan, who had been part of the majority in Toolson and International Boxing, also saw the majority as purely arbitrary in his short dissent. "I am unable to distinguish football from baseball under the rationale of Federal Baseball and Toolson", he wrote, "and can find no basis for attributing to Congress a purpose to put baseball in a class by itself". He accused the majority of using "discriminatory fiat" to make "untenable distinctions" between the two sports.

== Aftermath ==
With the case remanded for trial in the District Court, Maxwell Keith continued his representation who settled with the league for $42,500. Radovich said years later he believed Keith, who wanted him to drop the suit, "double-crossed" him. The settlement came after lengthy arguments between the two men over whether to proceed with the trial. Afterwards he says he learned Keith had been pressured to settle by the league.

"What I did opened doors", he said. "It's the first time that any professional sport was ever taken to court and beaten." He never worked in football again and died in 2002.

Alioto was later elected mayor of San Francisco for two terms. He and the NFL would meet again in antitrust court, most notably as adversaries when he successfully represented Los Angeles Memorial Coliseum Commission in its suit that cleared the way for the Oakland Raiders' move to that city. But he also successfully defended it against a suit brought by disgruntled Boston Patriots' quarterback Joe Kapp, and represented Philadelphia Eagles' owner Leonard Tose in an unsuccessful action against the bankers he alleged had conspired to try to force him to sell the team in the late 1970s.

== Legacy ==
Bell lobbied Congress to pass an antitrust exemption after the decision, and had almost succeeded before he died. His successor, Pete Rozelle, continued the effort, but was only able to get limited exemptions to allow sharing of television revenues (the Sports Broadcasting Act of 1961) and, later, the merger with the American Football League (AFL). Since the Court's ruling means professional football is covered under antitrust law, the NFL has faced a number of competing leagues and lawsuits it would not otherwise be subject to.

=== Competing leagues ===
The AFL had been formed by Lamar Hunt two years after Radovich was decided, and played for ten seasons. The NFL could not use the same tactics it had against the AAFC, and the two leagues merged in 1970 to become the modern NFL. When the Dallas Cowboys were created to compete for the same market as Hunt's Dallas Texans, the AFL brought a suit that eventually led to the merger.

Today the AFL is considered the NFL's most successful competitor. To secure the antitrust exemptions that made the merger possible, Rozelle promised Louisiana congressman Hale Boggs the NFL would expand into New Orleans, and the Saints and Cincinnati Bengals were added to the NFL and AFL respectively shortly thereafter.

In the 1970s the World Football League (WFL) took on the NFL. An apparently auspicious start, during a short players' strike, turned sour when it was discovered teams gave away many tickets, and soon the teams and their league were experiencing serious financial problems. After a season and a half it folded. The only two teams to have remained solvent applied to join the NFL as expansion teams but were rejected. One of the teams, the Memphis Grizzlies, sued the NFL in its own lawsuit, Mid-South Grizzlies v. National Football League. It took several years for the case to work its way through the federal court system; the Grizzlies ultimately lost their case. The Grizzlies case centered around the league's rejection of the Grizzlies' application making it impossible to maintain operations, which the courts claimed would instead open up opportunities for competing leagues.

The next decade brought the United States Football League (USFL), which played its season in the spring instead of autumn. After three seasons of play during which it never had the same number of teams and many franchises moved, it also filed an antitrust suit it had brought against the NFL. Seeking hundreds of millions of dollars and damages, USFL v. NFL centered around the NFL's television contracts, and in addition to the financial damages, it also sought to invalidate the league's contracts with at least one of the Big Three television networks that dominated U.S. TV at the time. The jury concluded that the NFL was indeed violating antitrust laws but refused to tear up the broadcast contracts (noting that a last-ditch effort to move the league's season to autumn forced out numerous major market teams that would have made a television package more appealing) and only awarded a token $3 judgment in the USFL's favor. The failure to secure either objective in the lawsuit, coupled with mounting debts, prompted the USFL to cease operations.

There have been two prominent efforts to establish a major professional football league outside the NFL's auspices since the USFL's lawsuit, neither of which has resulted in lawsuits or antitrust challenges. In 2001, NBC, shut out of its TV contract with pro football for the first time since the 1960s, formed the XFL as a joint venture with the World Wrestling Federation. The league played one short season, during the winter, and emphasized entertainment value over top-flight competition. Amid rapidly declining interest and viewer disappointment in the product, the XFL shut down. The United Football League sought to create a parallel pro league in 2009; the UFL managed to put a respectable product on the field but was shut out in its efforts to secure the paying television contract that was required to make the league's finances viable, and amid massive financial losses it played its last games in 2012, by which point the league was unable to draw fans or pay its players.

=== Labor issues ===
The owners recognized the National Football League Players Association (NFLPA) because some congressmen and senators pointed to the nonunion status of the league to deny support for exemptions. The NFLPA and the league clashed in court over labor issues and antitrust law. First there was Kapp's lawsuit, which the league eventually won when it was reheard by a jury. Then Baltimore Colts tight end John Mackey sued to block enforcement of the "Rozelle Rule", by which teams that signed another team's free agents were compensated with players or draft picks determined by the commissioner. His legal victory gave the players free agency, which their baseball counterparts had been denied by the Supreme Court, but the NFLPA bargained it away in return for compensation to current and former players affected by the Rozelle Rule.

After the 1987 strike, the players won it back, but only after New York Jets running back Freeman McNeil filed a successful lawsuit that challenged the free agency provisions under the Sherman Act. Eventually the players got the current free agency system in return for a salary cap.

The 1987 strike led to another antitrust action before the Supreme Court, Brown v. Pro Football, Inc. (518 U.S. 231 (1996)). Anthony Brown, a practice squad player for the Washington Redskins during the strike, challenged the teams' decision to unilaterally impose a $1,000 weekly maximum for practice players. This time, the NFL won, as the justices ruled 8-1 that groups of employers, as well as single employers, could implement a contract provision they had offered in good faith during an impasse.

=== Third parties ===
Two other significant actions have been brought against the NFL on antitrust grounds. The first was from the North American Soccer League (NASL), which challenged an NFL policy, never formally adopted, barring owners from having interests in other professional team sports. Rozelle had pushed for its inclusion as an amendment to the league constitution, believing that owners must be focused on football and could be in a conflict of interest with the NFL if they owned franchises in other sports, since the other sports competed for disposable income with the NFL. Opposing them were Hunt, Miami Dolphins' owner Joe Robbie and Edward Bennett Williams, who at the time owned the Baltimore Orioles as well as the Redskins. Hunt had founded the Dallas Tornado, and owned part of the NBA Chicago Bulls for a while. Robbie's wife owned the Fort Lauderdale Strikers, and Robbie himself warned that the policy was "an open invitation for a lawsuit under the Sherman Act".

The NASL brought suit against the NFL, arguing that its restrictions on cross-ownership were an unfair trade practice to deny other sports and leagues full access to the pool of experienced franchise owners. After losing in district court, it won on appeal but by then was in desperate straits, and folded two years later. The NFL's ownership policies were slightly modified; Rozelle never got the full limitations he wanted.

During that time, the most significant suit in modern NFL history was brought. The Los Angeles Memorial Coliseum Commission (LAMCC) sued the league over its provision requiring unanimous approval from other owners for franchise moves, which had otherwise hindered its efforts to conclude a lease with the Raiders, then playing in Oakland, where owner Al Davis was unhappy with the condition of Oakland–Alameda County Coliseum. Davis had also been incensed that the league had allowed the LA Coliseum's previous NFL team, the Los Angeles Rams, to move to Anaheim Stadium despite his abstention from the vote. His team began play in the LA Coliseum in 1982.

The LAMCC's suit was the NFL's most notable use of the "single entity" defense: that despite being composed of more than two dozen separate member teams it was one business for purposes of the Sherman Act. It failed both at trial and then in appeals court, and ultimately the Supreme Court denied certiorari in 1984. Shortly afterwards the Colts moved to Indianapolis, the first of several franchise moves made possible by the invalidation of the NFL's ability to prevent them.

=== Criticism ===
The NFL's antitrust-related legal entanglements as a result of Radovich have led to suggestions that antitrust law cannot be applied to professional sports leagues in the same way they are applied to other businesses. In 1981, while testifying before the House Judiciary Committees in support of another exemption bill, Rozelle complained that "[L]eagues are regularly damned in antitrust if they do and damned in antitrust if they don't." He noted that at the time, the city of Oakland was planning to sue the NFL if it allowed the Raiders to move to Los Angeles, and the LAMCC was suing it for not allowing the move.

Rozelle's complaint received some support in the 1990s when sports-law expert Gary Roberts testified to Congress that sports-related antitrust decisions, including many of those above, had been "inconsistent, often unjustifiable, and generally counterproductive". In Brown, Justice Stephen Breyer's majority opinion acknowledged that "clubs that make up a professional sports league are not completely independent economic competitors, as they depend upon a degree of cooperation for economic survival."

== See also ==
- American Needle, Inc. v. National Football League
- Mid-South Grizzlies v. National Football League
- List of United States Supreme Court cases, volume 352
