= Free transfer (association football) =

Transfer of an association football player whose contract has expired

In professional association football, a free transfer, also known as a Bosman transfer, involves a professional association football club releasing a player when the player's contract has expired or made available just before the end of the contract. The player can then sign for any club offering them a contract.

The club acquiring the player does not have to pay any compensation for their release due to having nothing left to pay on their contract, hence, the term free transfer. Some individual leagues have restrictions to protect academies. For example, in the UK, players under 24 who are out of contract are only available on a free transfer if released by the club holding the players' licence.

Another type of free transfer is when a player is transferred from one club to another for no price, sometimes a transfer for a nominal fee is credited as a free transfer.

With six months or less remaining on an existing contract for players aged 23 or older, they are free to negotiate with other clubs and sign a pre-contract agreement, indicating their ability to move to their intended club on a Bosman transfer when the next transfer window opens.

== Usage ==
Free transfers are common in all strata of football. From leagues where money is less commonly available for clubs to spend on transfer fees, and also for players to leave wealthy clubs on a free transfer if the club cannot offer first team football, especially when departing for clubs in lower leagues.

Often, a player will opt to 'run down' their contract with one club so that they may join another free subsequently. This makes them a more attractive proposition for the club the player seeks to join, and the lack of a transfer fee being paid by the receiving club is often reflected in a more lucrative salary for the player than had they been purchased. A good example of this would be Sol Campbell's move from Tottenham Hotspur to north-London rivals Arsenal.

== See also ==
- Free agent
- Free agent (association football)
- Reserve clause
- Transfer (association football)
