= Reserve clause =

Legal stipulation limiting sports personnel trade options

The reserve clause, in North American professional sports, was part of a player contract which stated that the rights to players were retained by the team upon the contract's expiration. Players under these contracts were not free to enter into another contract with another team. Once signed to a contract, players could, at the team's discretion, be reassigned, traded, sold, or released.

The only negotiating leverage of most players was to hold out at contract time and to refuse to play unless their conditions were met. Players were bound to negotiate a new contract to play another year for the same team or to ask to be released or traded. They had no freedom to change teams unless they were given an unconditional release. In the days of the reserve clause, that was the only way a player could be a free agent.

Once common in sports, the clause was abolished in baseball in 1975. The reserve clause system has, for the most part, been replaced by free agency.

== Baseball ==
In the late 19th century, professional baseball in America became popular enough that its major teams began to be businesses of considerable value, and the players were paid sums that were well above the wages earned by common workers. To control player salary demands, team owners used a standardized contract for the players, in which the major variable was salary. The players unsuccessfully tried to fight the growing reserve system by forming a labor union, the Brotherhood, and founding their own Players' League in 1890, but the Player's League lasted just one season. For the next 80 years, the so-called reserve system ruled the game. All player contracts were for one year. There were no modern-day long-term contracts, because the reserve clause negated the need for them.

The reserve clause inception was in 1879, when it was proposed as a way to formalize an unofficial rule known as the "five man rule". It would allow teams to reserve players for each season, unless a player opted out of his contract and did not play in the league for a year. While the previous informal rule was no secret, teams had started to sign other teams' "reserved players", thus encroaching the rule. The resulting controversies caused the National League to instate the rule officially on December 6, 1879.

Teams realized that if players were free to go from team to team then salaries would escalate dramatically. Therefore, they seldom granted players (at least valuable ones) a release, but retained their rights, or traded them to other teams for the rights to other players, or sold them outright for cash. Players thus had a choice only of signing for what their team offered them, or "holding out" (refusing to play, and therefore, not being paid).

Under the Sherman Antitrust Act of 1890, two or more non-affiliated companies in any other interstate business were prohibited from colluding with each other to fix prices or establish schedules or rates. Enforcement of the act reached its apotheosis in 1911 when the Supreme Court of the United States decided Standard Oil Co. of New Jersey v. United States (221 U.S. 1) by affirming the government's order to dissolve the Standard Oil conglomerate.

In 1914, Hal Chase successfully challenged the reserve clause in American League Baseball Club of Chicago v. Chase, a landmark case that preceded Curt Flood's challenge by 56 years. After Chase left the Chicago White Sox to join the Buffalo Blues of the rival Federal League, White Sox owner Charles Comiskey sought an injunction to enforce the reserve clause. On July 21, 1914, New York Supreme Court Justice Herbert Bissell ruled in Chase's favor, finding that organized baseball constituted "a complete monopoly of the baseball business for profit" and that this monopoly violated common law rights to labor and contract. The court also noted the "absolute lack of mutuality" in player contracts—teams could release players at will, but players could not leave teams. While the ruling allowed Chase to play for Buffalo, it did not dismantle the reserve clause system. American League president Ban Johnson and Comiskey retaliated by effectively blacklisting Chase from the American League, demonstrating the power of informal enforcement even when legal challenges succeeded.

However, under the reasoning that keeping baseball (the only large-scale professional sport in America during the 1920s) prosperous required granting it immunity from the Sherman Act, the Supreme Court had held in 1922 in Federal Baseball Club v. National League (259 U.S. 200) that baseball was an "amusement", and that organizing a schedule of games between independently owned and operated clubs operating in various states, and engaging in activities incidental thereto, did not constitute "interstate commerce" and therefore antitrust laws did not apply to such activity.

In 1951, Representative Emanuel Celler announced that he would hold hearings in the United States House Judiciary Committee to examine baseball's antitrust exemption. Celler entered the hearings believing that baseball needed laws to support the reserve clause. Star players, such as Lou Boudreau and Pee Wee Reese, indicated their support of the reserve clause. Minor league veteran Ross Horning testified about his experiences in baseball, which he said were more common for rank-and-file players. Cy Block testified about his experiences and how the reserve clause prevented him from getting an extended trial in the major leagues. Celler's final report suggested that the U.S. Congress should take no action, allowing for the matter to be settled in the federal judiciary of the United States. The Supreme Court upheld baseball's antitrust exemption and the reserve clause in Toolson v. New York Yankees, Inc. (346 U.S. 356) in 1953.

This pass on "trust-busting" essentially codified the legal legitimacy of the reserve clause for many years, and gave what came to be known as Major League Baseball (MLB) unprecedented power over both players and the independent organizations of the National Association of Professional Baseball Leagues (NAPBL). Major-league owners could dictate not only how and where players could move between major league clubs, but as they took the opportunity of the Great Depression to establish systems of farm teams of players wholly owned by the parent clubs placed on independent teams from the NAPBL leagues around the country, they developed a way of expanding control of contracts of virtually the entire pool of professional baseball players.

When other team sports, particularly ice hockey, football, and basketball developed professional leagues, their owners essentially emulated baseball's reserve clause. This system stood largely unchallenged other than by the occasional holdout (such as the 1966 Koufax–Drysdale holdout) for many years.

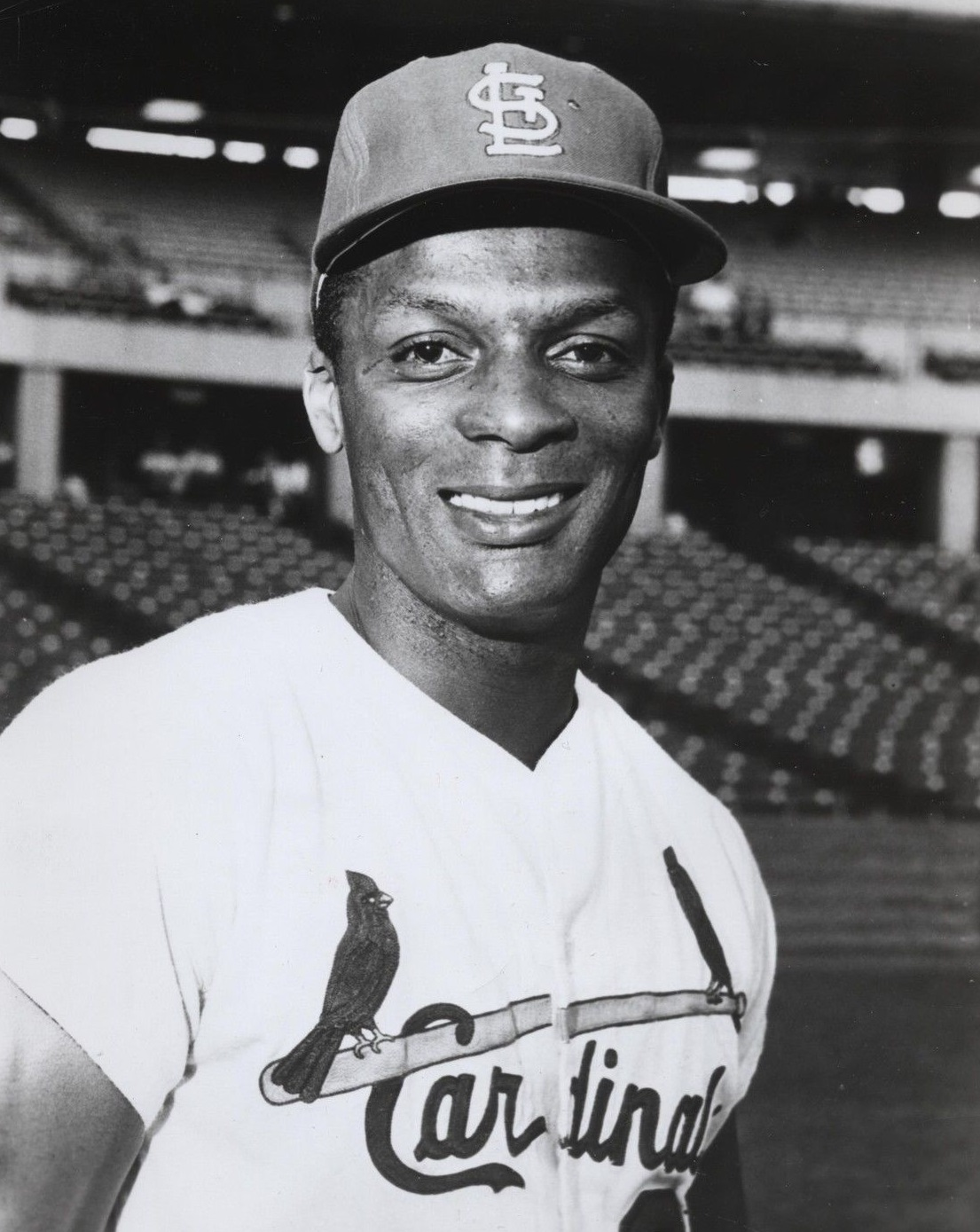
Curt Flood

In October 1969, St. Louis Cardinals outfielder Curt Flood unsuccessfully challenged his trade to the Philadelphia Phillies and sacrificed the remainder of his playing career to pursue this litigation. In Flood v. Kuhn (407 U.S. 258), the Supreme Court established that the reserve clause was a legitimate basis for negotiation in collective bargaining between players and owners, and that the historic baseball antitrust exemption was valid for baseball only and not applicable to any other sport. Although the Court ruled in baseball's favor 5–3, it admitted the original grounds for the antitrust exemption were tenuous at best, that baseball was indeed interstate commerce for purposes of the Sherman Act, and the exemption was an "anomaly" it had explicitly refused to extend to other professional sports or entertainment.

The specific language of the reserve clause, as quoted in the Supreme Court decision for Flood v. Kuhn, was:

10. (a) On or before January 15 (or if a Sunday, then the next preceding business day) of the year next following the last playing season covered by this contract, the Club may tender to the Player a contract for the term of that year by mailing the same to the Player at his address following his signature hereto, or if none be given, then at his last address of record with the Club. If prior to the March 1 next succeeding said January 15, the Player and the Club have not agreed upon the terms of such contract, then on or before 10 days after said March 1, the Club shall have the right by written notice to the Player at said address to renew this contract for the period of one year on the same terms, except that the amount payable to the Player shall be such as the club shall fix in said notice; provided, however, that said amount, if fixed by Major League Club, shall be an amount payable at a rate not less than 80% of the rate stipulated for the preceding year.

Removing the reserve clause from player contracts became the primary goal of negotiations between the Major League Baseball Players Association (MLBPA) and the owners. In December 1975, arbitrator Peter Seitz ruled that since pitchers Andy Messersmith and Dave McNally had played for one season without a contract, they could become free agents. That is, the unilateral renewal of a player's contract by his team was valid only once, not in perpetuity. The Seitz decision, as it became known, essentially dismantled the reserve clause and opened the door to widespread free agency in the major leagues.

== Basketball ==
The National Basketball Association (NBA) went through several phases of compensation and other arcane provisions before reaching almost unrestricted free agency. The first player in that league—and the first American major-league athlete—to challenge the reserve clause was Rick Barry. In 1969, he wanted to leave the San Francisco Warriors after his second season to play for the American Basketball Association’s (ABA) Oakland Oaks, who were coached by his father-in-law, Bruce Hale. Barry sat out a season before joining the Oaks.

== Football ==
On June 18, 1921, the National Football League (NFL) ratified its first constitution. The reserve clause ratified in the constitution was similar to that of baseball's at the time. The reserve clause stipulated that a team had the first opportunity to sign a player after the length of the contract had expired. If the team chose not to offer a contract, then the player could try to sign with a team of his choosing. Theoretically, the reserve clause bound the player "...to his employer in perpetuity". The reserve clause had been abolished in the NFL constitution in 1948 when the option clause was created. The option clause stated that a team may choose to automatically keep a player on their team for another year, at the same pay, after his contract had expired. The term, option clause, was not used by the print media and it was instead referred to as the reserve clause. Nevertheless, in the NFL's attempt to gain antitrust exemption from Congress in 1957, Bert Bell still referred to the clause as the option clause (and also as the "option and reserve clause").

Decades later, NFL players' mobility was limited by the so-called "Rozelle rule", named for the commissioner who first implemented it, which allowed the commissioner to "compensate" any team who lost a free agent to another team by taking something of equivalent value, usually draft picks, from the team that had signed the free agent and giving it to the team the player had left. Fear of losing several future high draft picks greatly limited free agency as no team wanted to sign a veteran player only to learn that it would lose, for example, its next two first-round draft picks.

The Rozelle rule was eventually replaced by "plan B", which allowed a team to name a thirty-seven man roster the reserve clause would apply to, and all players not included on this list were free agents. Few top-echelon players were left off this thirty-seven man roster unless they happened to be injured. Judge Earl R. Larson declared that the rule was a violation of antitrust laws in Mackey v. National Football League on December 30, 1975, and something resembling true free agency came to pro football. Now, exclusive rights to a player are only for the first three years after his selection in the college draft. At the end of the first three years, a player can be a "restricted free agent", allowing his former team to match any offer made to him by another. After four years in the NFL all contracts end with the player becoming an unrestricted free agent without reserve.

There is a franchise tag option that is similar to the reserve clause; however, teams can only tag one player each year, although they can tag the same player for consecutive years. Franchised players are eligible to receive at least 120% of their previous year's salary, and players tagged "non-exclusive" can accept offers from other teams; if the original team does not match the offer, they receive draft picks as compensation. In recent years, many teams have opted not to exercise their right to designate the franchise tag.

== Hockey ==
The reserve clause was the basis for the National Hockey League (NHL)'s injunction against the large number of players who had signed with the rival World Hockey Association in 1972, with all but one—against Chicago Black Hawks star Bobby Hull—ultimately thrown out by lower courts. The appellate court, however, sided strongly with the WHA and Hull, calling the NHL's business practices monopolistic, conspiratorial, and illegal. While the reserve clause was not explicitly struck down, the court did effectively block any further injunctions based on the reserve clause, meaning the NHL could not use it to maintain a monopoly on talent. The WHA, meanwhile, voted at its founding to not include any form of the reserve clause. The courts' refusal to enforce the reserve clause between leagues in hockey remains a significant part of the WHA's legacy, and it ultimately contributed to the evolution of the NHL's modern free agency system.

Nevertheless, the reserve clause remained in effect within the NHL itself. One notorious feature of the NHL version of the clause was that it remained enforceable notwithstanding whether a player was offered a new contract or not, as either way teams retained the NHL "rights" to no-longer-wanted players and could demand whatever compensation they saw fit in exchange for allowing such players to sign for another NHL team. Perhaps the most egregious example involved Toronto Maple Leafs veteran Dave Keon, who had developed a highly contentious relationship with Leafs owner Harold Ballard. Despite making it clear there was no place for Keon on the Leafs, Ballard insisted on an unreasonable compensation "price," including among other concessions at least one first round draft pick, and as such effectively blocked Keon from signing with any other NHL team. Keon was ultimately able to continue his career in the WHA, due to Ballard's aforementioned inability to enforce the reserve clause against the rival league.

The highly contentious negotiations between NHL owners and players that led to a lockout, wiping out the entire 2004–05 NHL season, were in part about free agency; the previous system precluded unrestricted free agency before the player reached 31 years of age. Most younger hockey free agents were restricted free agents whose teams could retain them by matching an offer from another club or making a "qualifying offer", which usually consisted of a ten percent raise above the pay in the former contract.

Following the 2004-05 lockout, owners eventually agreed to phase in a much lower age for unrestricted free agency (27 years of age or 7 years in the NHL, whichever comes first) in exchange for the players meeting owners' principal demand in the new NHL Collective Bargaining Agreement—an overall salary cap. Nevertheless, the league demanded the re-imposition of the 31-year-old threshold for free agency in the most recent lockout, but when union responded by threatening to disclaim interest and file antitrust suits against the league, the owners backed down.

== Soccer ==
Major League Soccer (MLS) is a professional soccer league representing the sport's highest level in both the United States and Canada. MLS constitutes one of the major professional sports leagues of the United States and Canada.

Unlike the other four major leagues of North American professional sport, MLS still retains a reserve clause in every player's contract. For Major League Soccer, this was initially to prevent clubs from competing with each other for player contracts, an aspect of single-entity designed to protect it from antitrust lawsuits. MLS is a single entity in which each team is owned and controlled by the league's investors. The investor-operators control their teams as owners control teams in other leagues, and are commonly (but inaccurately) referred to as the team's owners. In MLS's view of the global professional sports marketplace, internal bidding leads to increased costs. The league takes an additional step, imposing the reserve clause for players indefinitely, making player rights a commodity within the team structure for long after the player has left the league.

== See also ==
- Retain and transfer system, a similar system that restricted player movement in professional association football in England
- Bosman ruling, a European Court of Justice decision that ended a similar system in European association football

== Sources ==
- Algeo, Matthew (2006), Last Team Standing. Philadelphia: Da Capo Press. ISBN 978-0-306-81472-3
- Lyons, Robert S. (2010). On Any Given Sunday, A Life of Bert Bell. Philadelphia: Temple University Press. ISBN 978-1-59213-731-2
- Ruck, Rob; with Paterson, Maggie Jones and Weber, Michael P. (2010) Rooney:a Sporting Life. Lincoln: University of Nebraska Press. ISBN 978-0-8032-2283-0
- Willis, Chris (2010). The Man Who Built the National Football League:Joe F. Carr. Lanham, Maryland: Scarecrow Press, Inc. ISBN 978-0-8108-7669-9
