= United States v. International Boxing Club of New York, Inc. =

1955 United States Supreme Court case

United States v. International Boxing Club of New York
- Supreme Court of the United States

Argued November 10, 1954 Decided January 31, 1955
- Full case name: United States v. International Boxing Club of New York, Inc., International Boxing Club, Madison Square Garden Corporation, James D. Norris and Arthur M. Wirtz
- Citations: 348 U.S. 236 (more) 75 S. Ct. 259; 99 L. Ed. 2d 290; 1955 U.S. LEXIS 1544

Case history
- Prior: 123 F. Supp. 575 (S.D.N.Y. 1954)
- Subsequent: International Boxing Club of New York v. United States, 358 U.S. 242 (1959)

Holding
- Antitrust exemption granted by previous rulings to professional baseball is specific and unique to it and does not cover boxing despite similarities to baseball as currently exists

Court membership
- Chief Justice Earl Warren Associate Justices Hugo Black · Stanley F. Reed; Felix Frankfurter · William O. Douglas; Harold H. Burton · Tom C. Clark; Sherman Minton

Case opinions
- Majority: Warren, joined by Burton, Reed
- Dissent: Frankfurter, joined by Minton
- Dissent: Minton

Laws applied
- Sherman Antitrust Act

United States v. International Boxing Club of New York, 348 U.S. 236 (1955), often referred to as International Boxing Club or just International Boxing, was an antitrust decision of the U.S. Supreme Court. By a 7–2 margin, the justices ruled that the exemption it had previously upheld for Major League Baseball was peculiar and unique to that sport and that it did not apply to boxing. Since it met the definition of interstate commerce, the government could therefore proceed with a trial to prove IBCNY and the other defendants had conspired to monopolize the market for championship boxing in the United States.

It was the first time another sport had argued it was covered by the same exemption as baseball by virtue of being a professional sport. Chief Justice Earl Warren, writing for the majority, admitted that it would never have reached the Court but for the baseball exemption, and dissenting justices Felix Frankfurter and Sherman Minton were unsparing in their criticism of the arbitrary nature of this distinction.

The case was remanded for trial, which the government won, forcing the breakup of some of the defendant companies. An appeal of that decision also was ultimately decided by the Supreme Court four years later, upholding the wide discretion and scope of district court judges in shaping remedies for antitrust violations.

== Background of the case ==
In January 1949 James D. Norris and Arthur Wirtz, who controlled boxing at several major arenas including Madison Square Garden, Chicago Stadium and Detroit Olympia through the International Boxing Club of New York, paid the recently retired Joe Louis $100,000 for four fighters he managed. They agreed that those fighters would fight it out among themselves for the new heavyweight title, and in return fight only in matches Norris and Wirtz promoted for several years.

This gave them an effective monopoly on all major boxing matches save those in the flyweight and bantamweight divisions. From 1949 to 1955 all but two championship fights took place under their control. They also secured exclusive television contracts for twice-weekly fights at the Garden, at a time when boxing was increasingly coming to depend on television revenues.

== Trial and appeal ==
The Justice Department began investigating for possible antitrust violations and brought the IBCNY to trial in the Southern District of New York under the Sherman Antitrust Act in 1953. Before it started, the defendants moved to dismiss the complaint, citing the Court's recent decision in Toolson v. New York Yankees (346 U.S. 356 (1953)) to uphold the antitrust exemption granted Major League Baseball in 1922's Federal Baseball Club v. National League (259 U.S. 200 (1922)). Like baseball, they reasoned, the interstate travel required to facilitate boxing was incidental to the staging of fights and thus boxing was not subject to antitrust law as it was not interstate commerce.

The district court granted the motion. Immediately afterward, the government appealed the dismissal directly to the Supreme Court under the Expediting Act.

== Decision ==
Chief Justice Earl Warren wrote for the majority. Felix Frankfurter and Sherman Minton dissented, with Minton signing Frankfurter's opinion as well.

=== Majority ===
"The question is perhaps a novel one in that this Court has never before considered the antitrust status of the boxing business", Warren wrote. "Yet, if it were not for Federal Baseball and Toolson, we think that it would be too clear for dispute that the Government's allegations bring the defendants within the scope of the Act." Boxing clearly involved interstate arrangements, he said, particularly with broadcasting involved, and as early as Hart v. B.F. Keith Vaudeville Exchange (262 U.S. 271 (1923)) the Court had been clear that baseball's antitrust exemption could not be claimed by any other business.

Prior to the Court's consideration of Toolson, he recalled, Congress had considered and rejected other bills intended specifically to genericize the baseball exemption. "The issue confronting us is therefore not whether a previously granted exemption should continue," he concluded, "but whether an exemption should be granted in the first instance. And that issue is for Congress to resolve, not this Court."

=== Dissents ===
"It would baffle the subtlest ingenuity to find a single differentiating factor between other sporting exhibitions, whether boxing or football or tennis, and baseball", Frankfurter began. The Toolson majority, which he had been part of, had applied stare decisis, the legal doctrine under which flawed decisions can be upheld as the lesser of two evils. But here he found his colleagues irrational and inconsistent.

It can hardly be that this Court gave a preferred position to baseball because it is the great American sport. I do not suppose that the Court would treat the national anthem differently from other songs if the nature of a song became relevant to adjudication. If stare decisis be one aspect of law, as it is, to disregard it in identic situations is mere caprice ... I cannot translate even the narrowest conception of stare decisis into the equivalent of writing into the Sherman Law an exemption of baseball to the exclusion of every other sport different not one legal jot or tittle from it.

Minton, too, saw flawed logic. Unlike Frankfurter, he believed that boxing generally did not constitute interstate commerce, noting that the broadcasters and sponsors had not been named as defendants by the government, and that the Court was turning Federal Baseball's conclusion on its head.

When boxers travel from State to State, carrying their shorts and fancy dressing robes in a ditty bag in order to participate in a boxing bout, which is wholly intrastate, it is now held by this Court that the boxing bout becomes interstate commerce. What this Court held in the Federal Baseball case to be incident to the exhibition now becomes more important than the exhibition. This is as fine an example of the tail wagging the dog as can be conjured up.

He conceded that Louis had a monopoly on the championship when he retired and gave the defendants exclusives on the four fighters' championship contests, but from competition in the ring, not the marketplace. "As I see it, boxing is not trade or commerce. There can be no monopoly or restraint of nonexistent commerce or trade", he concluded.

== Legacy ==
The antitrust suit proceeded and the government won. The IBCNY appealed the divestitures proposed by the judge as having gone past the original offense, and that case came to the Supreme Court again as International Boxing Club of New York v. United States (358 U.S. 242 (1959)). Again the justices ruled in the government's favor, and Norris and Wirtz dissolved the organization and sold their interest in the other defendant organizations.

While they left boxing, they remained involved in professional sports as owners of the Chicago Blackhawks National Hockey League franchise. Wirtz's great-grandson Danny is today the team's principal owner.

== See also ==
- List of United States Supreme Court cases by the Warren Court
