= Simmons Bank Liberty Stadium =

Stadium in Memphis, Tennessee, United States

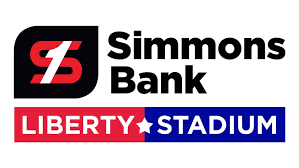

- The stadium as seen from above in 2026

- Location in Tennessee Location in the United States
- Former names: Memphis Memorial Stadium (1965–1975); Liberty Bowl Memorial Stadium (1975–2022)
- Address: 335 South Hollywood Street
- Location: Memphis, Tennessee
- Coordinates: 35.1210°N 89.9774°W
- Owner: University of Memphis
- Operator: University of Memphis
- Capacity: 45,632 (2026–present) List: 33,691 (2024-2025); 58,325 (2016–2023); 59,308 (2013–2015); 61,008 (2007–2012); 62,338 (2003–2006); 62,921 (1999–2002); 62,380 (1987–1998); 50,160 (1965–1986)
- Surface: AstroTurf (2011–present) Former: List: FieldTurf (2005–2011); Grass (1965–2004); AstroTurf (end zones only 1995 for CFL games)
- Record attendance: 66,487 (Tennessee vs. Ole Miss 1990)
- Public transit: MATA

Construction
- Groundbreaking: 1963
- Opened: September 16, 1965; 61 years ago
- Expanded: 1987
- Cost: $3.7 million (original) ($37.8 million in 2025 dollars) $19.5 million (1987 renovations) ($55.3 million in 2025 dollars) $38 million (improvements and Tiger Lane, 2013)
- Architects: Yeates, Gaskill & Rhodes; Bounds & Gillespie Architects (1987 renovations); Tom Marshall, O.T. Marshall Architects (2013 improvements and Tiger Lane)

Tenant
- Memphis Tigers (NCAA FBS) (1965–present); Liberty Bowl (NCAA FBS) (1965–present); Southern Heritage Classic (NCAA FCS) (1990–present); Former tenants: List: Memphis Southmen (WFL) (1974–1975); Memphis Rogues (NASL) (1978–1980); Memphis Showboats (USFL) (1984–1985); Memphis Mad Dogs (CFL) (1995); Tennessee Oilers (NFL) (1997); Memphis Maniax (XFL) (2001); Memphis Express (AAF) (2019); Memphis Showboats (USFL/UFL) (2023–2025)

Website
- simmonsbankstadium.com

Simmons Bank Liberty Stadium, originally named Memphis Memorial Stadium, and later Liberty Bowl Memorial Stadium, is a football stadium located at the former Mid-South Fairgrounds in the Midtown area of Memphis, Tennessee, United States. The stadium is the site of the annual Liberty Bowl, the annual Southern Heritage Classic, and is the home field of the University of Memphis Tigers football team of the American Athletic Conference. It has also been the host of several attempts at professional sports in the city, as well as other local football games and other gatherings.

== History ==
The stadium was originally built as Memphis Memorial Stadium in 1965 for $3 million, as a part of the Mid-South Fairgrounds, then home to one of the South's most popular fairs, but now conducted in neighboring DeSoto County, Mississippi. The fairgrounds also included the now-defunct Mid-South Coliseum (formerly the city's major indoor venue) as well as the now-closed Libertyland amusement park, which has been demolished and replaced with an amateur indoor sports venue. It was dedicated as a memorial to the citizens of Memphis who had served in World War I, World War II, and the Korean War.

The facility was built partially as a way to bring the Liberty Bowl to a permanent home in Memphis (the game had started in Philadelphia, but because of poor attendance as a northern bowl, it left the city, playing one year in Atlantic City before settling in Memphis). The game was such a success for Memphis that the stadium was renamed Liberty Bowl Memorial Stadium in December 1975. As originally built, the stadium was lopsided, with the southwest side being taller than the northeast side. A 1987 expansion brought it to its current, balanced configuration, although with a much greater hospitality building topping the northeast section.

Its design is similar to that of old Tampa Stadium ("The Big Sombrero"), with the endzone grandstands being much shorter than the sidelines. The stadium is designed in such a way that all of its seats have a relatively good view of most of the playing surface. This is due primarily to two design factors. The stands are relatively steep for a one-tier, true bowl stadium. Also, there is little space between the side and end lines of the playing surface and the stands.

In December 1983, the playing field was renamed Rex Dockery Field in honor of Rex Dockery, a former Memphis Tigers football coach who had recently died in a plane crash. The field, which had been natural grass since its inception, was replaced with a FieldTurf surface before the 2005 season; this was subsequently replaced with the modern version of AstroTurf.

On January 1, 2007, then-Memphis Mayor Willie Herenton proposed a new stadium be built in place of the old one, a proposal that was ultimately rejected.

In 2013, the Liberty Bowl and its setting received a $38 million facelift. It was repainted, and new lighting, new elevators, new turf, renovation of luxury boxes, better handicapped access, were added as part of the design by Memphis architect Tom Marshall of O.T. Marshall Architects. In addition, two new video boards were added, costing $2.5 million and including a Jumbotron, contributed by FedEx, which is headquartered in Memphis. In addition, 17-acre (6.9 ha) Tiger Lane was created as a green space for tailgating and community events.

In 2021, Simmons Bank become the title sponsor for the stadium and renaming it from Liberty Bowl Memorial Stadium to become Simmons Bank Liberty Stadium.

On May 12, 2022 officials revealed plans to renovate the stadium before the 2025 football season, costing around $200 million. Completed with help of architecture firm Populous, plans include the demolition and replacement of the west side tower and most of the west side of the bowl, new premium seating, renovation of the east side suites, and updating hospitality spaces around the stadium. Construction began after the 2023 football season; the Tigers and Showboats will continue to play in the stadium during renovations. Seating capacity will be temporarily reduced to 30,000, then restored to approximately 50,000 after the renovations are complete.

On January 9, 2024, the City of Memphis transferred ownership of the stadium to the University of Memphis and contributed $120 million to renovations of the stadium, with an additional $50 million coming from FedEx chairman Fred Smith, and $50 million from the university.

== Tenants ==
=== Major tenants ===
Since its opening, the stadium has hosted the Memphis Tigers football team from the University of Memphis. Before this, the team had spent 29 seasons at Crump Stadium. It was not the first time the team had played at the fairgrounds; before playing at Crump, the team had played two seasons there at a former park. As of the start of the 2006 season, the team had a 130-106-7 record at the stadium.

Also since its opening, the stadium has hosted the Liberty Bowl game. It annually hosts teams from the SEC and Big 12 Conferences, with the American Athletic Conference as an alternate if neither conference can fulfill its bowl allotment. In the past, the winner of the Commander in Chief's Trophy, the Conference USA champion, and the Mountain West Conference champion have all been awarded automatic bids.

The stadium is also the host of the "Southern Heritage Classic", a game between two historically black schools, University of Arkansas at Pine Bluff and Tennessee State University. The stadium also has hosted home games of the Tennessee Vols, Ole Miss Rebels, and Mississippi State Bulldogs.

The Memphis Express of the Alliance of American Football played in the stadium for its sole season in 2019.

The Memphis Showboats of the United Football League played in the stadium until folding after the 2025 season. The Houston Gamblers also played there as a hub team in 2023.

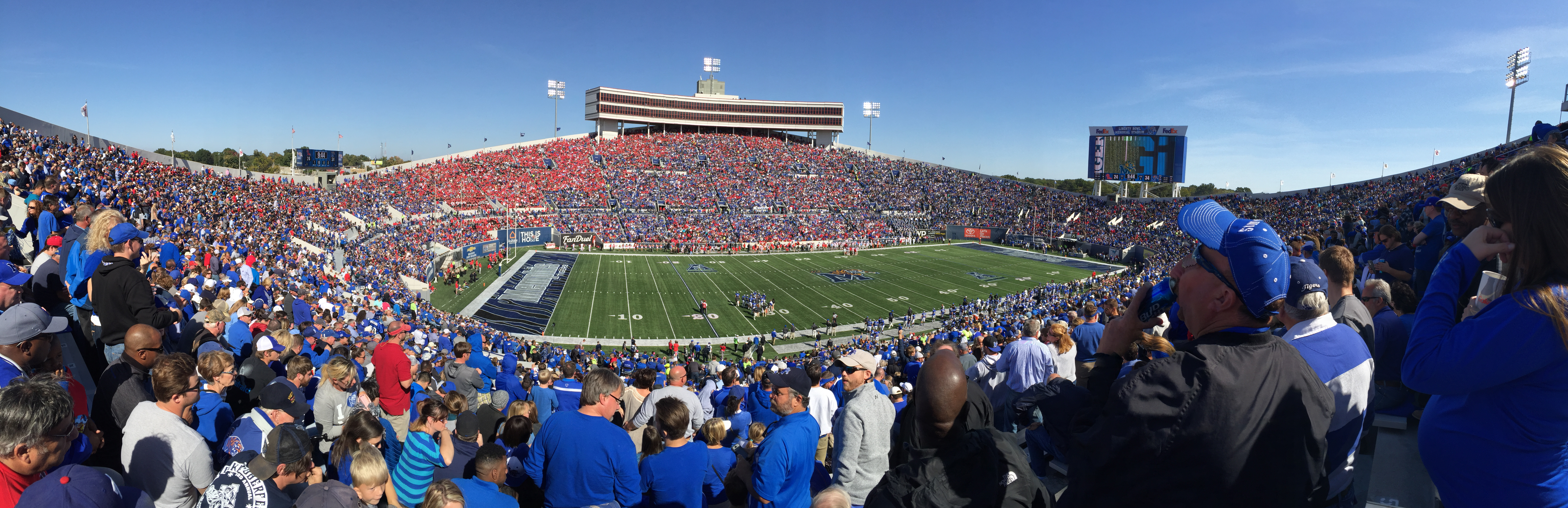
Panorama of Liberty Bowl Memorial Stadium during a Tigers game in 2015

=== Early professional football ===
In 1974 and 1975, the stadium hosted the Memphis Southmen, aka "Grizzlies", of the World Football League. The Southmen drew fairly well, at least by WFL standards, in part due to the presence on their roster of some well-known players recruited away from the NFL at considerable expense. By nearly all accounts, they would have been a viable venture had the WFL been better run.

Much, perhaps too much, was read into this relative success at the gate. When the WFL folded, the team formally changed its name to the Grizzlies and made a bid to join the NFL as an expansion team for the 1976 NFL season, with a telethon even being staged for this purpose. Over 40,000 people put down deposits for season tickets for the would-be NFL team. Despite this seemingly overwhelming show of support, the NFL ignored Memphis' pleas and the "Griz" folded. Owner John Bassett filed a lawsuit against the league, but was unsuccessful.

In 1984, the original United States Football League added the Memphis Showboats as an expansion team. The Showboats, featuring defensive end Reggie White and coached by flamboyant Memphian Pepper Rodgers, were one of the better draws in the league. They advanced to the semifinals in 1985. Much like the Southmen before them, it was generally believed the Showboats would have been a viable venture had their league been better organized.

However, this attempt caused the city of Memphis to decide on expanding the stadium, in the hopes of luring an NFL franchise to the city. To this end, the Liberty Bowl underwent a $12 million facelift. As mentioned above, the stands were built up to the same level as the west ones, adding about 12,000 seats, and a "skybox" of luxury suites was added to the top of those stands. After the renovation, the then-St. Louis Cardinals played an exhibition game there before a sellout crowd.

Despite its efforts, the city was unsuccessful in luring an NFL team (which would have been called the "Memphis Hound Dogs") to the Liberty Bowl.

=== Mad Dogs ===
Not willing to give up on pro football, in 1995 the Liberty Bowl welcomed the Memphis Mad Dogs as part of the Canadian Football League's attempt at bringing their league into American markets.

Due to the design features noted earlier, it was extremely difficult to shoehorn a Canadian football field onto the Liberty Bowl's playing surface. Canadian fields are 10 yards longer and 35 feet wider than in the U.S. version, and the end zones are 20 yards deep rather than 10; few U.S. football stadiums are designed to easily accommodate a playing surface of this size. Had the attempt to play the Canadian game included a CFL full-width field, players not participating in the game and the coaching staffs would have to have been seated in the stands. Likewise, 20 yards past the goal line at the Liberty Bowl puts one several rows up into the end zone stands. AstroTurf sections were added around the grass field to accommodate the required width, while the end zones became half AstroTurf/half grass pentagons in order to bring the field to the required length. However, the end zones were nowhere near regulation; they averaged around 9 yards in length, and no other American stadium had end zones shorter than 15 yards. The stands jutted into the corners of the end zones, creating a distinct safety hazard. The only real concession to the Canadian format that was feasible at the Liberty Bowl was the moving of the goal posts to the goal line, where they are in the Canadian game, as opposed to the end line. The result was what amounted to a hybrid game, played by Canadian rules on essentially a U.S. field.

Despite these limitations, the Mad Dogs, coached by Rodgers, drew fairly well during the early part of the season. However, they were tripped up by quirks in the CFL schedule. The CFL season runs from July to November so as to conclude before the harsh Canadian winters set in and make conditions unbearable for players, coaches, officials, and especially spectators. Its games were generally scheduled for Thursday, Friday and Saturday nights—the same nights on which high school and college football games are played in the United States. The Mad Dogs knew that once college football season started, most fans preferred to drive across Interstate 40 to watch Tennessee football or down Interstate 55 to watch Ole Miss or Mississippi State. (The Birmingham Barracudas faced similar problems due to competition from Alabama and Auburn.) With this in mind, the CFL moved the Mad Dogs and Barracudas' late season home games to Sunday afternoons. While this put both teams in direct competition with NFL television broadcasts, it was initially thought to be an acceptable risk since neither city was particularly loyal to one NFL team. However, even with these changes, the Liberty Bowl became a virtual ghost town late in the season, with several crowds well below 10,000. It soon became apparent that the Mad Dogs were not a viable venture. Although they finished one game out of the playoffs, their dreadful attendance figures caused them to fold at the end of the season along with the other American teams.

=== Oilers ===
In 1997, the NFL's Houston Oilers announced that they would play two seasons in Memphis as the Tennessee Oilers before the Adelphia Coliseum, their new stadium in Nashville (now Nissan Stadium), was completed in time for the 1999 season. The largest stadium in Nashville at the time, Vanderbilt Stadium, then seated only 41,000 fans—too few even for temporary use. Vanderbilt University was also unwilling at the time to let beer be sold at games. Although the Vols' Neyland Stadium in Knoxville was slightly closer to Nashville, it was deemed too big (at over 102,000 seats) for an NFL team. Pepper Rodgers was named the Oilers' "Director of Memphis Operations." The team was to live and practice in Nashville, commuting to Memphis only for games.

Although the idea seemed acceptable enough to the league and the team at the time, the 1997 season was a disaster, because of the lack of fan ownership for the temporary team. Many Memphians wanted nothing to do with a team which would be lost in two years —especially to longtime rival Nashville. For their part, Nashvillians were skittish about having to drive 210 miles (340 km) to see "their" team play. In an unfortunate coincidence, Interstate 40 was undergoing extensive repairs just east of Memphis at the time. This lengthened the normal three hour drive from Nashville to Memphis to five hours or longer. As a result, the Oilers played before some of the smallest home crowds seen in the NFL since the 1950s for most games, and the visiting teams often seemed to have more supporters than the Oilers.

Even though none of the Oilers' first seven games attracted more than 27,000 people, Oilers' owner Bud Adams was initially willing to stick it out in Memphis for one more season. However, that changed with the only game that drew more fans than could have comfortably been accommodated at Vanderbilt, the year's final game against the Pittsburgh Steelers. While 50,677 people showed up, the great majority of them (three-fourths of the crowd, by one estimate) were Steeler fans. Adams was so disgusted that he ripped up the Memphis agreement a year early in favor of playing at Vanderbilt in 1998.

=== Maniax ===
A subsequent major professional tenant was the Memphis Maniax of the first XFL. The Maniax finished tied for second place in the Western Division at 5–5 with the San Francisco Demons, but did not make the playoffs. The league folded after one season.

=== Other former tenants ===
From 1978 to 1980, the Memphis Rogues of the North American Soccer League called the stadium home. The playing surface is somewhat smaller than that generally favored by soccer, but that sport adapts to smaller playing surfaces better than some others (the preferred width of a soccer pitch is 70 to 80 yards, but the rules allow for a pitch as narrow as 50 yards wide). Like the Southmen, the Rogues seemingly did fairly well in a league that wasn't doing all that well as a whole. Despite their success, the team moved to Calgary, although this move was due more to the owner, Nelson Skalbania, a Canadian businessman, wanting to move the team to his home country.

One of the more interesting events held in the stadium was an exhibition Major League Baseball game involving the Atlanta Braves and Milwaukee Brewers during the 1975 season. The game was sponsored by the Memphis Blues minor league team. The right-field fence was only 174 feet (53 m) from home plate, about 125 feet (38 m) shorter than the dimensions of most major league parks.

== Concerts ==
Date	Artist	Opening Act(s)	Tour Name
July 28, 1974	Eric Clapton	Lynyrd Skynyrd; Foghat	Memphis Jam 1974
July 4, 1975	The Rolling Stones	The J. Geils Band; The Charlie Daniels Band; The Meters; Furry Lewis	The Rolling Stones' Tour of the Americas '75
July 4, 1976	ZZ Top	Lynyrd Skynyrd Blue Öyster Cult Outlaws Point Blank	Worldwide Texas Tour
September 4, 1982	REO Speedwagon	Kansas Joan Jett & the Blackhearts Survivor	Budweiser Superjam '82
July 9, 1988	Van Halen	Scorpions Dokken Metallica Kingdom Come	Monsters of Rock Tour 1988
April 27, 1993	Paul McCartney	--	The New World Tour
September 27, 1994	The Rolling Stones	Blind Melon	Voodoo Lounge Tour
May 14, 1997	U2	Rage Against the Machine	PopMart Tour

== In popular culture ==
Towards the end of the now iconic 2001 SpongeBob SquarePants episode "Band Geeks", the Liberty Bowl was featured in a brief clip of a 1984 USFL game between the Showboats and the Tampa Bay Bandits before cutting to Squidward and his band playing "Sweet Victory" on the field.

== See also ==
- List of NCAA Division I FBS football stadiums
- List of American football stadiums by capacity

Events and tenants
Preceded by Crump Stadium	Home of the Memphis Tigers; 1965 – present	Succeeded by Current
Preceded by Convention Hall	Home of the Liberty Bowl; 1965 – present	Succeeded by Current
Preceded by Astrodome	Home of the Tennessee Oilers; 1997	Succeeded by Vanderbilt Stadium
