= Ross Horning =

American historian and baseball player

- Born: October 10, 1920; Watertown, South Dakota, US
- Died: April 1, 2005 (aged 84); Omaha, Nebraska, US
- Awards: Fulbright scholarship

Academic background
- Education: Augustana College (BA); George Washington University (MA, Ph.D.)

Academic work
- Sub-discipline: Russian history
- Institutions: Wisconsin State College at Eau Claire; Saint John's University; Creighton University

Ross Charles Horning Jr. (October 10, 1920 – April 1, 2005) was an American historian and baseball player. He played professional baseball in the minor leagues while completing his studies. Horning was a professor of Russian history at Creighton University.

== Early life ==
Horning was born in Watertown, South Dakota, to Ross Sr. and Harriet Horning. He had seven siblings. Horning attended Watertown High School, where he earned letters in basketball and football and was captain of the basketball team.

== Baseball career ==
In 1941, Horning made his professional baseball debut with the Sioux Falls Canaries of the Class D Western League. He returned to Sioux Falls, now in the Class C Northern League, in the 1942 season. During the season, he was sold to the Duluth Dukes of the Northern League for the money Sioux Falls needed to finance their next road trip. He objected to the trade because Sioux Falls would cover players' living expenses on the road trip, while Duluth was going to be starting a homestand, meaning Horning would need to find a place to rent. After spending a few weeks with Duluth, Horning enlisted in the United States Army Air Corps, leaving during the 1942 season. In March 1944, while he was still in the service, Horning's contract was transferred to the Sacramento Solons of the Pacific Coast League.

When he returned to baseball in 1946, Horning reported to spring training with Sacramento, but he was given his outright release in spite of the national law that permitted members of the armed services to reclaim their previous jobs after returning from war. Horning returned to the Canaries during the 1946 season. He played in the Northern League's all-star game. In 1947, he was traded from Sioux Falls to the Hutchinson Cubs of the Class C Western Association. Horning refused to report to Hutchinson, Kansas, due to his schooling at Augustana College in Sioux Falls. After holding out for a few weeks, Horning reported to Hutchinson, but also continued to pay his boarding costs in Sioux Falls. When Hutchinson tried to assign Horning to the Visalia Cubs of the Class C California League in 1948, he said that he would not report to the team until after he graduated in June. Instead, Horning was released.

Horning continued to play baseball as a semi-professional in Minnesota in 1948. He also played for the Quebec Braves of the Canadian–American League in 1949 and as player-manager for the Pierre Cowboys of the Basin League. In the meantime, Horning studied for his Doctor of Philosophy at George Washington University.

=== Congressional testimony ===
In August 1951, Representative Emanuel Celler announced that he was calling Horning as a witness before the United States House Judiciary Committee to examine the anti-trust exemption granted to Major League Baseball (MLB). Celler entered the hearings believing that MLB needed laws to support the reserve clause. While star players, such as Lou Boudreau and Pee Wee Reese, indicated their support of the reserve clause. Horning described his experiences in baseball as more common for rank-and-file players and called for changing the reserve clause. Cy Block also testified regarding how the reserve clause limited his chances at playing in the major leagues. Celler's final report suggested that the U.S. Congress should take no action, allowing for the matter to be settled in the federal judiciary of the United States. The Supreme Court of the United States upheld MLB's anti-trust exemption and the reserve clause in Toolson v. New York Yankees, Inc. in 1953.

== Academic career ==
After Horning completed his Bachelor of Arts at Augustana College in 1948, he enrolled at George Washington University's Elliott School of International Affairs and studied for a Master of Arts in foreign affairs, which he earned in 1952. Horning began to pursue a Doctor of Philosophy in Russian history, international law, and European and American diplomacy. Horning completed his Doctor of Philosophy degree in October 1958 and became a professor at Wisconsin State College at Eau Claire that year. He also served as an assistant coach for their baseball team.

In September 1959, Horning became a faculty member of the history department at Saint John's University in Collegeville, Minnesota. He also served as the head coach for their baseball in 1960, leaving the position in 1961. In 1961, he was a visiting professor at the University of Ottawa. Horning became a professor of Russian history and international diplomacy at Creighton University in 1964. In 1967, he was awarded a Fulbright scholarship to spend two months studying in India. Horning was an unsuccessful candidate for a position on the University of Nebraska system's board of regents in 1970. In 1981, Horning won the Distinguished Faculty-Service Award from Creighton.

After his death, the Department of History at Creighton University launched the Annual Ross Horning Lecture in his honor. Speakers have included Chuck Hagel, George McGovern, Eric Schlosser, Margaret MacMillan, and Scott Simon.

== Personal life ==
His mother, Harriet Horning, was state auditor of South Dakota from 1959 to 1960. His brother, Bill, was a college baseball coach and worked in Creighton's athletic department. In 1980, Horning ran unsuccessfully to be Nebraska's member on the Democratic National Committee.

Horning married Maxine (née Spath), who was a classmate at Augustana College, on February 26, 1949. Horning died on April 1, 2005.
