= American Needle, Inc. v. National Football League =

American Needle v. NFL
- Supreme Court of the United States

Argued January 13, 2010 Decided May 24, 2010
- Full case name: American Needle, Inc., Petitioner v. National Football League, et al.
- Docket no.: 08-661
- Citations: 560 U.S. 183 (more) 130 S. Ct. 2201; 176 L. Ed. 2d 947; 94 U.S.P.Q.2d 1673

Case history
- Prior: 538 F.3d 736, 88 U.S.P.Q.2d 1358 (7th Cir. 2008)

Holding
- The National Football League's licensing of intellectual property in this case constitutes concerted action that is capable of violating Section 1 of the Sherman Antitrust Act.

Court membership
- Chief Justice John Roberts Associate Justices John P. Stevens · Antonin Scalia; Anthony Kennedy · Clarence Thomas; Ruth Bader Ginsburg · Stephen Breyer; Samuel Alito · Sonia Sotomayor

Case opinion
- Majority: Stevens, joined by unanimous

Laws applied
- Sherman Antitrust Act

American Needle, Inc. v. National Football League, 560 U.S. 183 (2010), was a United States Supreme Court case regarding the ability of teams in the National Football League to conspire for purposes of a violation of §1 of the Sherman Antitrust Act.

== Background ==
The alleged conspiracy involved the formation of the National Football League Properties (NFLP), an entity responsible for licensing NFL intellectual property (IP) and formed in 1963. Before that date the NFL teams marketed their IP rights individually. Proceeds from NFLP activity were evenly distributed among the teams.

Between 1963 and 2000, the NFLP granted nonexclusive licenses to various suppliers permitting the manufacture and resale of apparel bearing team insignias. The petitioner in this case, American Needle, Inc., was one of those license holders. In December 2000, the teams voted to authorize the NFLP to begin granting exclusive licenses. The NFLP granted a 10-year exclusive license to Reebok to manufacture and sell trademarked headwear bearing team insignia of all 32 teams. At that point, the NFLP did not renew American Needle's nonexclusive license.

== Opinion of the Court ==
In a unanimous decision, the Court held that NFL teams are distinct economic actors with separate economic interests that are capable of conspiring under §1 of the Sherman Act.

== See also ==
- Mid-South Grizzlies v. National Football League
- Radovich v. National Football League
