= Ward & Gow v. Krinsky =

- Supreme Court of the United States

Argued December 14, 1921 Decided June 5, 1922
- Full case name: Ward & Gow v. Krinsky
- Citations: 259 U.S. 503 (more) 42 S.Ct. 529; 66 L.Ed. 1033; 28 A.L.R. 1207

Case history
- Prior: Krinsky v. Ward & Gow, 231 N.Y. 525, 132 N.E. 873 (1921)

Court membership
- Chief Justice William H. Taft Associate Justices Joseph McKenna · Oliver W. Holmes Jr. William R. Day · Willis Van Devanter; Mahlon Pitney · James C. McReynolds; Louis Brandeis · John H. Clarke

Case opinions
- Majority: Pitney, joined by Taft, Holmes, Day, Van Devanter, Brandeis, Clarke
- Dissent: McReynolds, joined by McKenna

Ward & Gow v. Krinsky, 259 U.S. 503 (1922), is a United States Supreme Court case holding that state governments did not need to limit their worker's compensation programs to those in hazardous industries, allowing them to instead target medium and large employers.

== Background ==
New York Central Railroad Co. v. White (1916) had upheld a New York state worker's compensation program limited to employees of hazardous industries. In 1918, the New York State Legislature amended the underlying statute to cover all workplaces with at least four employees. In response to New York state courts successively upholding the expanded program, this case on the inclusion of newspaper salesmen was appealed to the United States Supreme Court.

== Supreme Court ==
Writing for the majority, Associate Justice Mahlon Pitney framed the hazardousness of employment as shown by the occupational injuries which produced claims under the expanded program. Defending the law against an Equal Protection Clause challenge that four employees is an arbitrary threshold, Pitney opined that the legislature had reasonably assumed that small employers could not bear the financial burden of contributing to worker's compensation.

Associate Justice James Clark McReynolds dissented, arguing that selling newspapers is insufficiently hazardous to justify the legislative assumption that injuries sustained while working are attributable to the employer.
