= Ng Fung Ho v. White =

- Supreme Court of the United States

Argued March 17–20, 1922 Decided May 29, 1922
- Full case name: Ng Fung Ho v. White
- Citations: 259 U.S. 276 (more) 42 S. Ct. 492; 66 L. Ed. 938

Case history
- Prior: 266 F. 765 (9th Cir. 1920)

Holding
- In habeas corpus proceedings to test the validity of a deportation order, the petitioner is entitled to a de novo judicial trial on a claim of citizenship.

Court membership
- Chief Justice William H. Taft Associate Justices Joseph McKenna · Oliver W. Holmes Jr. William R. Day · Willis Van Devanter; Mahlon Pitney · James C. McReynolds; Louis Brandeis · John H. Clarke

Case opinion
- Majority: Brandeis, joined by a unanimous Court

Ng Fung Ho v. White, 259 U.S. 276 (1922), is a United States Supreme Court decision holding that habeas corpus petitioners are entitled to a de novo judicial hearing to adjudicate claims that they are citizens of the United States.
