= International Boxing Club of New York =

Boxing organisation

The International Boxing Club of New York was a corporation formed by James D. Norris and Arthur M. Wirtz in 1949 to promote boxing bouts at Madison Square Garden, Polo Grounds, Yankee Stadium, St. Nicholas Arena, Chicago Stadium and Detroit Olympia.

== Monopoly ==
Control of Madison Square Garden

In 1949 Madison Square Garden paid Mike Jacobs of Twentieth Century Boxing Club $100,000 to relinquish his rights to promote fights at the Garden. Jacobs had become ill as a result of a stroke and the Garden wanted to turn over promotion to the IBC. The IBC had obtained the contracts of four contenders from Joe Louis for $160,000 on his retirement, and wanted to promote the fight in the Garden.

The IBC developed a stranglehold on championship boxing, promoting 47 out of 51 championship bouts in the United States from 1949 to 1955. Its major revenues were acquired through television of twice-weekly boxing bouts from the Garden.

Legal Troubles

Norris and Wirtz formed the International Boxing Club of Illinois to discourage the perception that the IBC monopolized boxing. Norris resigned as president of IBC of New York in favor of Truman Gibson and the IBC was bought by the Garden and operated as a wholly owned subsidiary. But Judge Sylvester Ryan of the U.S. District Court decided the IBC of New York was a monopoly and ordered its dissolution. Norris and Wirtz were given five years to divest themselves of their holdings (approximately 40%) in the Garden. Ryan also declared the IBC of Illinois a monopoly and ordered its dissolution as well. The decisions were appealed but confirmed on January 12, 1959 by the U.S. Supreme Court.

In a surprise move, on January 30, 1959 Norris and Wirtz announced they were selling their interest in the Garden to Graham-Paige Corporation, a New York investment company. The sale became official on February 19, 1959.

== Ties to the Mafia ==
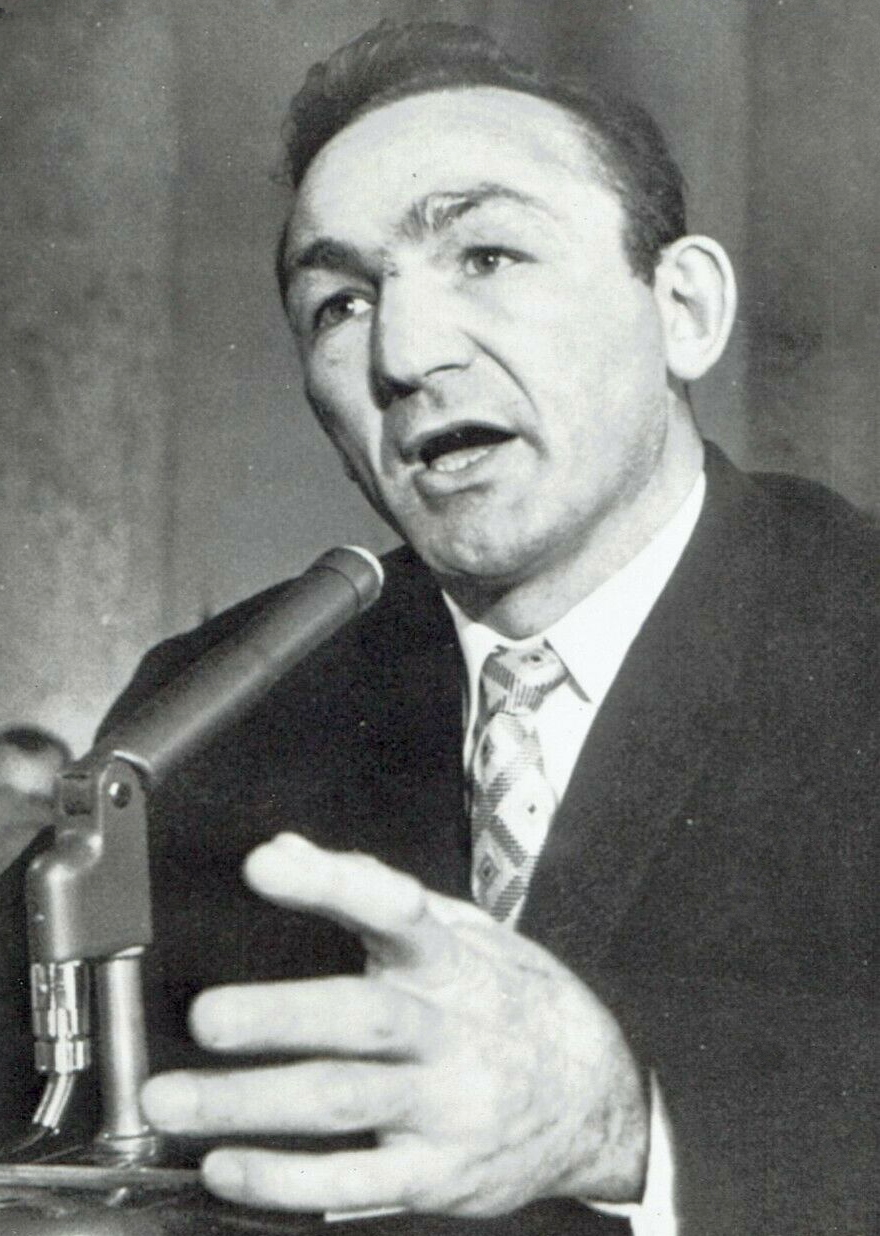
Basilio testifies to U.S. Senate about mafia in 1960

In 1960, the Senate Subcommittee on Antitrust and Monopoly chaired by Senator Estes Kefauver held hearings into organized crime and professional boxing. It was revealed that the IBC had ties to Mafioso Frankie Carbo, a soldier in New York's Lucchese Family who had been a gunman with Murder, Inc. At the time of the hearings, Carbo was imprisoned on Riker's Island, having been convicted of the undercover management of prizefighters and unlicensed matchmaking. The hearings revealed that Carbo's wife was employed by the IBC at a salary of $45,000 a year.

Former world welterweight and middleweight champion Carmen Basilio testified before the Subcommittee, giving evidence on Carbo, Carbo's partner Frank "Blinky" Palermo (a member of the St. Louis crime family) and Carbo's aide, Gabriel Genovese, a cousin of Mafia Don Vito Genovese who was convicted in 1959 of being an unlicensed boxing manager. Calling for a house cleaning of professional boxing, Basilio's testimony revealed that his former managers had to pay off organized crime for his title shots and that he essentially had a behind the scenes manager in Genovese. He also told of meeting with Carbo, who he had first met in the mid-1950s.

Evidence submitted to the subcommittee showed that Basilio's on-the-record managers, John DeJohn and Joseph Netro, paid Gabriel Genovese $39,334.41 and approximately $25,000, respectively, during the time Basilio fought for and defended his welterweight and middleweight titles.

The following year, Gibson Jr. and Carbo, Carbo's partner "Blinky" Palermo, and Los Angeles mobsters Joe Di Sica and Louis Dragna, were charged with conspiracy and extortion against National Boxing Association Welterweight Champion Don Jordan. After a three-month trial, in which U.S. Attorney General Robert Kennedy served as prosecutor, the defendants were convicted and sent to federal prison.

== See also ==
- United States v. International Boxing Club of New York
