= Cy Block =

American baseball player (1919–2004)

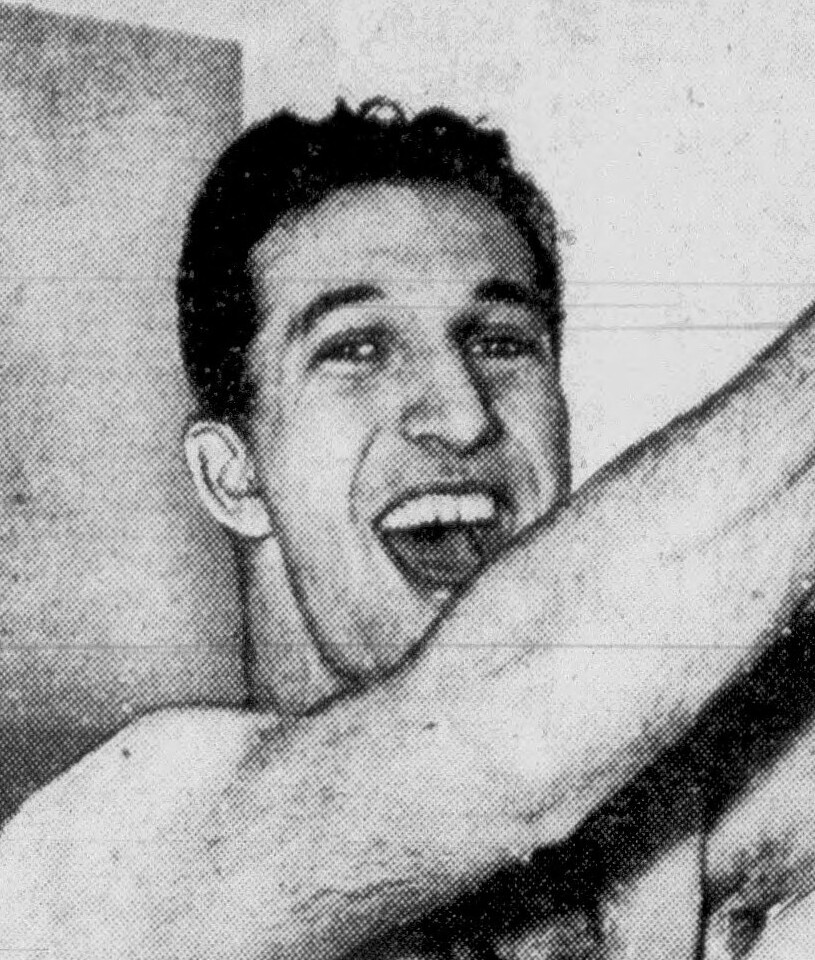
- Block in 1946
- Second baseman / Third baseman
- Born: May 4, 1919; Brooklyn, New York, US
- Died: September 22, 2004 (aged 85); Manhasset, New York, US
- Batted: Right Threw: Right

MLB debut
- September 7, 1942, for the Chicago Cubs

Last MLB appearance
- September 23, 1946, for the Chicago Cubs

MLB statistics
- Fielding percentage: .960
- Putouts: 19
- Batting average: .302
- Stats at Baseball Reference

Teams
- Chicago Cubs (1942, 1945–1946)

Seymour "Cy" Block (May 4, 1919 – September 22, 2004) was an American professional baseball second baseman and third baseman for the Chicago Cubs of Major League Baseball during the 1942, 1945, and 1946 seasons. He played in the minor leagues from 1938 to 1950, with the exception of his military service from 1943 to 1944. After his playing career, Block became an insurance salesman.

== Early life ==
Block was born on May 4, 1919, in Brooklyn, a borough of New York City. His parents, Abraham and Jenny (née Levitsky), were immigrants from Russia. He was raised in Flatbush, near Ebbets Field, the home of the Brooklyn Dodgers of Major League Baseball (MLB).

Block attended Boys High School in Bedford–Stuyvesant, where he was told that he was too small and not good enough to make the school's baseball team. He organized a sandlot ball team and played American Legion Baseball.

== Baseball career ==
=== 1937–1942 ===
In 1937, Block attended an open tryout for the Dodgers at Ebbets Field; though he survived the first cut and was invited to another tryout in Elmira, New York, the Dodgers opted not to sign him. In 1938, Block attended Joe Stripp's baseball academy in Orlando, Florida, where he received personal instruction from Joe Tinker.

Tinker recommended Block to the Memphis Chicks of the Class A1 Southern Association. They assigned him to the Paragould Rebels of the Class D Northeast Arkansas League for the 1938 season. Block was batting .331 for Paragould, the fourth-best average in the Northeast Arkansas League, when Memphis acquired Block from Paragould. In 1939, Memphis optioned Block to the Greenville Buckshots of the Class C Cotton States League. He had agreed to a salary of $125 per month with Memphis, but received $85 per month from Greenville. He appealed to William G. Bramham, the president of Minor League Baseball, who declined to intervene, and wrote to Kenesaw Mountain Landis, the Commissioner of Baseball, who did not meet with him for a year and a half.

In April 1940, Memphis sold Block to the Elmira Pioneers of the Class A Eastern League, a farm team for the Dodgers; later in the month, Elmira assigned Block to the Macon Peaches of the Class B South Atlantic League. He batted .311 in 1940. Landis met with Block after the 1940 season, who told him that Block would only have a case if he had the salary agreement in writing, which he did not. Elmira added Block to their reserve list going into the 1941 season. Playing for Macon in 1941, Block won the league's batting championship with a .357 batting average.

In January 1942, the Chicago Cubs purchased Block from Macon for $15,000. The Cubs gave Block and Glen Russell an opportunity to compete with Stan Hack, the incumbent third baseman of the Cubs, for playing time during spring training. The Cubs optioned Block to the Tulsa Oilers of the Class A1 Texas League before the start of the 1942 season. Block made his major league debut with the Cubs on September 7. He batted .364 (12-for-33) in nine games. Block enlisted in the United States Coast Guard during World War II and served at Ellis Island and on the USS Monticello.

=== 1945–1951 ===
In September 1945, Block was honorably discharged from the Coast Guard. Returning to the Cubs, Block appeared in two games during the 1945 season. He batted .143 (1-for-7). Block appeared in one game of the 1945 World Series, which the Cubs lost to the Detroit Tigers. He entered the game as a pinch runner and did not record an official at-bat. In 1946, the Cubs optioned Block to the Los Angeles Angels of the Pacific Coast League. In June, Los Angeles optioned Block to the Nashville Volunteers of the Class AA Southern Association, where he succeeded Pete Elko as their third baseman. Block batted .354 in 81 games for Nashville. He was again recalled to the Cubs in September 1946 and appeared in six games for the Cubs before the end of the season. Block batted .231 (3-for-13).

In April 1947, the Cubs released Block, who was out of options, to Nashville. He appealed to James T. Gallagher, the general manager of the Cubs, to sell him to another MLB team instead. Larry Gilbert, Nashville's owner, allowed Block to try to arrange a deal with an MLB team, but Block found that the Cubs refused to trade him. Block appealed to the new commissioner, Ford Frick, who told Block that there was nothing that he could do. Block reported to Nashville and batted .360. His average was the second-best in the league, behind Ted Kluszewski, who batted .377, and Block was named to the league's post-season all-star team. After the 1947 season, Nashville traded Block to the Buffalo Bisons of the Class AAA International League for a minor league pitcher and an undisclosed amount of money. Block played for Buffalo from 1948 to 1950 before he was released in April 1951.

Block played in 17 major league games in his career, finishing with a .302 batting average in the major leagues. He retired with a lifetime .325 batting average in professional baseball.

=== Congressional testimony ===
In 1951, Representative Emanuel Celler announced that he would hold hearings in the United States House Judiciary Committee to examine MLB's anti-trust exemption. Celler entered the hearings believing that MLB needed laws to support the reserve clause. Star players, such as Lou Boudreau and Pee Wee Reese, indicated their support of the reserve clause. Minor league veteran Ross Horning testified about his experiences in baseball, which he said were more common for rank-and-file players. Block testified about his experiences and how the reserve clause prevented him from getting an extended trial in the major leagues.

Celler's final report suggested that the U.S. Congress should take no action, allowing for the matter to be settled in the federal judiciary of the United States. The Supreme Court of the United States upheld MLB's anti-trust exemption and the reserve clause in Toolson v. New York Yankees, Inc. in 1953.

== Business career ==
Block began to sell life insurance after the 1950 season, and made $120,000 of sales. He sold $480,000 in 1951, reached $1 million in sales in 1952, and had sold $6 million in 1963. Block became a twelve-time member of the Million Dollar Round Table, which requires $1 million in sales for membership. He worked for Mutual Benefit Life Insurance Company before becoming chairman of his own firm, CB Planning Services Corp.

In December 1955, Block led a six-member syndicate which attempted to purchase the Detroit Tigers from Walter Briggs Jr. Though they made a good-faith $250,000 deposit to signify their interest, their offer to purchase the club was received by Briggs after the deadline.

== Personal life ==
In 1943, he married Harriet Block. Together they had three daughters. He also authored a book, So You Want to be a Major Leaguer, in 1980.

Block was Jewish. He was involved with B'nai B'rith and served on the board of directors for Israel Tennis Centers and the American Committee of the Maccabiah Games. Block also founded several Little League Baseball leagues in New York.

In 1997, Block and four other players from before 1947, Dolph Camilli, Frankie Crosetti, Al Gionfriddo, and Pete Coscarart, brought a class action lawsuit against MLB alleging that the league was profiting off of their likeness without compensating them. They were denied class certification.

Block developed Alzheimer's disease in 1995. He died in his home on Long Island on September 29, 2004.
