= Toolson v. New York Yankees, Inc. =

1953 United States Supreme Court case

Toolson v. New York Yankees
- Supreme Court of the United States

Argued October 13, 1953 Decided November 9, 1953
- Full case name: George Earl Toolson v. New York Yankees, Inc., et al.
- Citations: 346 U.S. 356 (more) 74 S. Ct. 78; 98 L. Ed. 64; 1953 U.S. LEXIS 2680; 1953 Trade Cas. (CCH) ¶ 67,602

Case history
- Prior: Cert. to the United States Court of Appeals for the Ninth Circuit

Holding
- Congressional intent to maintain antitrust exemption for professional baseball created by prior Court presumed as a result of congressional inaction since that decision; proper remedy is thus legislative action. Ninth Circuit affirmed.

Court membership
- Chief Justice Earl Warren Associate Justices Hugo Black · Stanley F. Reed; Felix Frankfurter · William O. Douglas; Robert H. Jackson · Harold H. Burton; Tom C. Clark · Sherman Minton

Case opinions
- Per curiam
- Dissent: Burton, joined by Reed

Laws applied
- Sherman Antitrust Act

Toolson v. New York Yankees, 346 U.S. 356 (1953), is a United States Supreme Court case in which the Court upheld, 7–2, the antitrust exemption first granted to Major League Baseball (MLB) three decades earlier in Federal Baseball Club v. National League. It was also the first challenge to the reserve clause which prevented free agency, and one of the first cases heard and decided by the Warren Court.

Since it presumed that Congress's failure to act in the years since Federal Baseball Club was an implicit expression of intent to keep baseball exempt from the Sherman Antitrust Act, it has been read as having done more to create that exemption than the older case. Two justices (Stanley Forman Reed and Harold Hitz Burton) dissented from the short, unsigned per curiam majority opinion, arguing MLB and its revenue sources had changed enough since 1922 that the logic of that case no longer applied. In 1972, a third justice (William O. Douglas) would express his regret at having joined the majority when Toolson was again upheld in the similar Flood v. Kuhn.

== Background ==
George Earl Toolson was a pitcher with the Newark Bears in 1949, a farm team for the New York Yankees in the AAA-class International League. He believed he was good enough to play in the major leagues, if not for the Yankees then for another team. But due to the reserve clause in his and every other player's contract, under which teams reserved rights to a player for a year after the contract expired, he was effectively bound to the talent-rich Yankees and could not negotiate a new contract with another team.

When the Newark franchise was dissolved prior to the 1950 season, he was demoted by the Yankees' organization to the Binghamton Triplets, an A-class team within its minor league system. He refused to report and instead filed suit, arguing the reserve clause was a restraint of trade and that baseball should not be exempt from antitrust laws.

=== Baseball antitrust exemption ===
In 1922, in an opinion by Justice Oliver Wendell Holmes Jr., a unanimous court held in Federal Baseball Club that professional baseball did not meet the definition of interstate commerce under the Constitution and the Sherman Act because, although teams traveled between states from game to game, that travel was "incidental" to the business and not an essential aspect, since all the revenue was generated from the actual games.

By the time Toolson filed his suit, baseball had grown greatly in popularity and as such had changed. Improved roads and public transportation meant that fans in some areas crossed state lines to attend games, and radio and television broadcasts, from which the teams derived substantial revenue, brought those games to the fans who did not leave home. The interstate aspects of the professional game had greatly increased.

In 1947, Commissioner of Baseball Happy Chandler was sued by former New York Giants outfielder Danny Gardella, who argued that the five-year ban Chandler imposed on players who, like Gardella, had jumped briefly to the rival Mexican League was an unfair use of monopoly power and that the Federal Baseball Club decision no longer applied. A preliminary ruling in favor of the baseball commissioner was reversed by the Second Circuit Court of Appeals, returning the case to the lower court for trial. In 1949, Chandler settled with Gardella for a reported $65,000 ($735,000 in 2025). Gardella initially sought $300,000, settling for less on his lawyers' advice he would lose on appeal to the Supreme Court.

In 1951, Representative Emanuel Celler, an advocate for strong antitrust enforcement, chaired a special Judiciary Committee subcommittee on monopoly power, which had looked into baseball, among other things. Celler entered the hearings believing that MLB needed laws to support the reserve clause. Star players, such as Lou Boudreau and Pee Wee Reese, indicated their support of the reserve clause. Minor league veteran Ross Horning testified about his experiences in baseball, which he said were more common for rank-and-file players. Cy Block, who appeared briefly in the major leagues, testified about his experiences and how the reserve clause prevented him from getting an extended trial in the major leagues. Celler's final report suggested that the Congress should take no action, allowing for the matter to be settled in the federal judiciary of the United States.

=== Trial and appeal ===
Both the district court in Los Angeles and the Ninth Circuit relied on Federal Baseball Club in ruling for the defendants. The Supreme Court granted certiorari to hear it and consider a number of other cases by former Mexican League players pending at the appellate level.

Among the lawyers working on the case for baseball was Bowie Kuhn, then of the prestigious firm Willkie Farr & Gallagher, who would later himself become baseball commissioner and the respondent in Flood v. Kuhn, the next case to challenge the reserve clause. When the case reached the Supreme Court, the Boston Red Sox filed an amicus curiae brief in support of the Yankees, their bitter rival. Since the Second Circuit, in reinstating Gardella's challenge, had called Federal Baseball "an impotent zombie" in light of recent Supreme Court antitrust decisions, baseball did not expect the Court to rule in its favor.

== Opinion of the Court ==
A one-paragraph unsigned per curiam opinion was followed by a longer dissent by Justice Harold Hitz Burton, joined by Stanley Forman Reed.

=== Majority ===
After briefly restating the conclusion of Federal Baseball Club, the majority continued:

Congress has had the ruling under consideration, but has not seen fit to bring such business under these laws by legislation having prospective effect. The business has thus been left for thirty years to develop on the understanding that it was not subject to existing antitrust legislation ... [I]f there are evils in this field which now warrant application to it of the antitrust laws, it should be by legislation. Without reexamination of the underlying issues, the judgments below are affirmed ... so far as that decision determines that Congress had no intention of including the business of baseball within the scope of the federal antitrust laws.

=== Dissent ===
Burton listed a number of aspects of contemporary baseball—the extensive farm system, broadcasting revenues, national advertising campaigns and even its reach beyond the borders of the United States—to justify his statement that "it is a contradiction in terms to say that the defendants in the cases before us are not now engaged in interstate trade or commerce as those terms are used in the Constitution of the United States and in the Sherman Act". He also cited a report by a House subcommittee that had come to a similar conclusion.

He conceded "the major asset which baseball is to our Nation, the high place it enjoys in the hearts of our people, and the possible justification of special treatment for organized sports which are engaged in interstate trade or commerce". But while it was certainly within Congress's power to repeal or specifically enact an antitrust exemption for baseball, it had not done so, "and no court has demonstrated the existence of an implied exemption from that Act of any sport that is so highly organized as to amount to an interstate monopoly or which restrains interstate trade or commerce". He concluded "The present popularity of organized baseball increases, rather than diminishes, the importance of its compliance with standards of reasonableness comparable with those now required by law of interstate trade or commerce."

== Subsequent developments ==
=== Jurisprudence ===
Within the next few terms, Toolson's logic was criticized directly and indirectly by other justices, including some who had been in the majority, in dissents from opinions in which the Court held that it was specific to baseball and that even other professional sports weren't covered.

Chief Justice Earl Warren admitted, writing for the majority two years later when denying boxing the exemption, that "this Court has never before considered the antitrust status of the boxing business. Yet, if it were not for Federal Baseball and Toolson, we think that it would be too clear for dispute." Dissenters Felix Frankfurter and Sherman Minton, who were in the Toolson majority, were harshly critical. "It would baffle the subtlest ingenuity to find a single differentiating factor between other sporting exhibitions ...and baseball insofar as the conduct of the sport is relevant to the criteria or considerations by which the Sherman Law becomes applicable to a 'trade or commerce.'", the former wrote. "I cannot translate even the narrowest conception of stare decisis into the equivalent of writing into the Sherman Law an exemption of baseball to the exclusion of every other sport different not one legal jot or tittle from it." Minton, in his dissent, added:

When boxers travel from State to State, carrying their shorts and fancy dressing robes in a ditty bag in order to participate in a boxing bout, which is wholly intrastate, it is now held by this Court that the boxing bout becomes interstate commerce. What this Court held in the Federal Baseball case to be incident to the exhibition now becomes more important than the exhibition. This is as fine an example of the tail wagging the dog as can be conjured up.

Another two years passed, and Radovich v. National Football League came before the Court. The circumstances of professional football at the time were almost identical to those of baseball, yet the Court ruled that the antitrust exemption was specific to the latter. Tom C. Clark, writing for a majority of six, defended the Toolson decision as preferable to the alternative: "[M]ore harm would be done in overruling Federal Baseball than in upholding a ruling which, at best, was of dubious validity" and admitted "were we considering the question of baseball for the first time upon a clean slate, we would have no doubts."

Frankfurter again expressed his incredulity. "...[T]he most conscientious probing of the text and the interstices of the Sherman Law fails to disclose that Congress, whose will we are enforcing, excluded baseball — the conditions under which that sport is carried on — from the scope of the Sherman Law, but included football", he said. He was joined in a separate opinion by John Marshall Harlan II signed by then-new justice William Brennan: " I am unable to distinguish football from baseball under the rationale of Federal Baseball and Toolson, and can find no basis for attributing to Congress a purpose to put baseball in a class by itself."

==== Flood v. Kuhn ====
In 1970, St. Louis Cardinals star center fielder Curt Flood decided to refuse a trade to the Philadelphia Phillies and challenge the reserve clause again. Due to his stature as a player, his case attracted wide attention, and reached the Court in 1972. Although Flood lost, widespread support for his suit paved the way for free agency.

William O. Douglas, who had been on the Toolson majority, had ruled in a 1971 emergency appeal from a suit brought by Spencer Haywood that basketball wasn't exempt, either, and suggested he was reconsidering his role in Toolson: "the decision in this suit would be similar to the one on baseball's reserve clause which our decisions exempting baseball from the antitrust laws have foreclosed." The following year he was the only justice from the Toolson court still sitting when Flood v. Kuhn was heard, and made his change of mind explicit in a footnote to his dissent: "While I joined the Court's opinion in Toolson ... I have lived to regret it; and I would now correct what I believe to be its fundamental error."

In that case's majority opinion, Harry Blackmun conceded that the facts no longer supported the exemption and that baseball was indeed interstate commerce, but echoed Clark in suggesting that the consequences of overturning the previous decisions would be worse than letting it stand. Chief Justice Warren Burger agreed in a short concurrence that also indicated his acceptance of Douglas's regret.

=== Legal analysis and criticism ===
Sports business historian Andrew Zimbalist attributes the unexpected outcome to "a game of cat and mouse" between Congress and the Court:

The Congress did not pass a bill lifting baseball's exemption because it thought it had already been lifted by the 1948 Gardella decision. The Supreme Court affirmed the Holmes decision because it thought Congress had given its sanction to the exemption by not passing new legislation in 1951.

Much of the criticism of Toolson over the years has viewed it as the middle term of the sequence that begins with Federal Baseball Club and ends with Flood, and considers it in that context. Its embrace of stare decisis and presumption of congressional inaction as a justification, is notably at odds with the position that Justice Felix Frankfurter took when writing for the Court in a 1940 trust-law case, Helvering v. Hallock, where prior flawed decisions had not been corrected through legislative action, that "it would require very persuasive circumstances enveloping Congressional silence to debar this Court from re-examining its own doctrines"

One critic, antitrust expert Kevin McDonald of Jones Day, singles out the 1953 case for having truly created the antitrust exemption by reading congressional intent into Holmes' original opinion. After quoting the per curiam's closing sentence, he writes:

With that baseless assertion, the baseball exemption was born. As we have seen, Federal Baseball said nothing about the Congress of 1890 intentionally excluding baseball from the Sherman Act. It is as if the majority in Toolson imagined Senator Sherman announcing that "today we enact the Magna Carta of the working class so that all American business will respect the right of consumers to free and open competition ... that is, um, except for organized baseball, of course." Indeed, what did it mean to affirm Federal Baseball "so far as that decision determines that Congress had no intention of including ... baseball within the ... antitrust laws", when Federal Baseball said no such thing?

Lower courts, he said, took the court's reasoning to mean that other professional team sports were also exempt, forcing the justices to clarify that it only applied to baseball, and criticize their earlier ruling, in order to sustain decisions that football and boxing were interstate commerce and within the scope of antitrust law.

=== Effect on baseball ===
Toolson's career was over, and MLB resumed its status quo ante. But the underlying issues remained, and a decade later began to be addressed when players unionized as the Major League Baseball Players Association, with free agency one of many goals.

Two years later, baseball held its first amateur draft, ending the system whereby wealthier and successful teams like the Yankees were able to keep their farm teams stocked with talent the way they had with Toolson, not only as insurance against player injuries but to prevent opposing teams from signing them. That ended the continuous domination of the Yankees.

Despite legal and judicial criticism and embarrassment, baseball's antitrust exemption remains in effect. Players in the major leagues won free agency with the Seitz decision in 1975, and the 1998 Curt Flood Act gave major league players, but not others involved in baseball, rights under the antitrust laws. But for players in the minor leagues, like Toolson, the reserve system persists, and they are still bound to the organization that initially signed them.

== See also ==
- 1953 in baseball
- Baseball law
- List of United States Supreme Court cases, volume 346
- List of United States Supreme Court cases by the Warren Court
