= Emanuel Celler =

American politician (1888–1981)

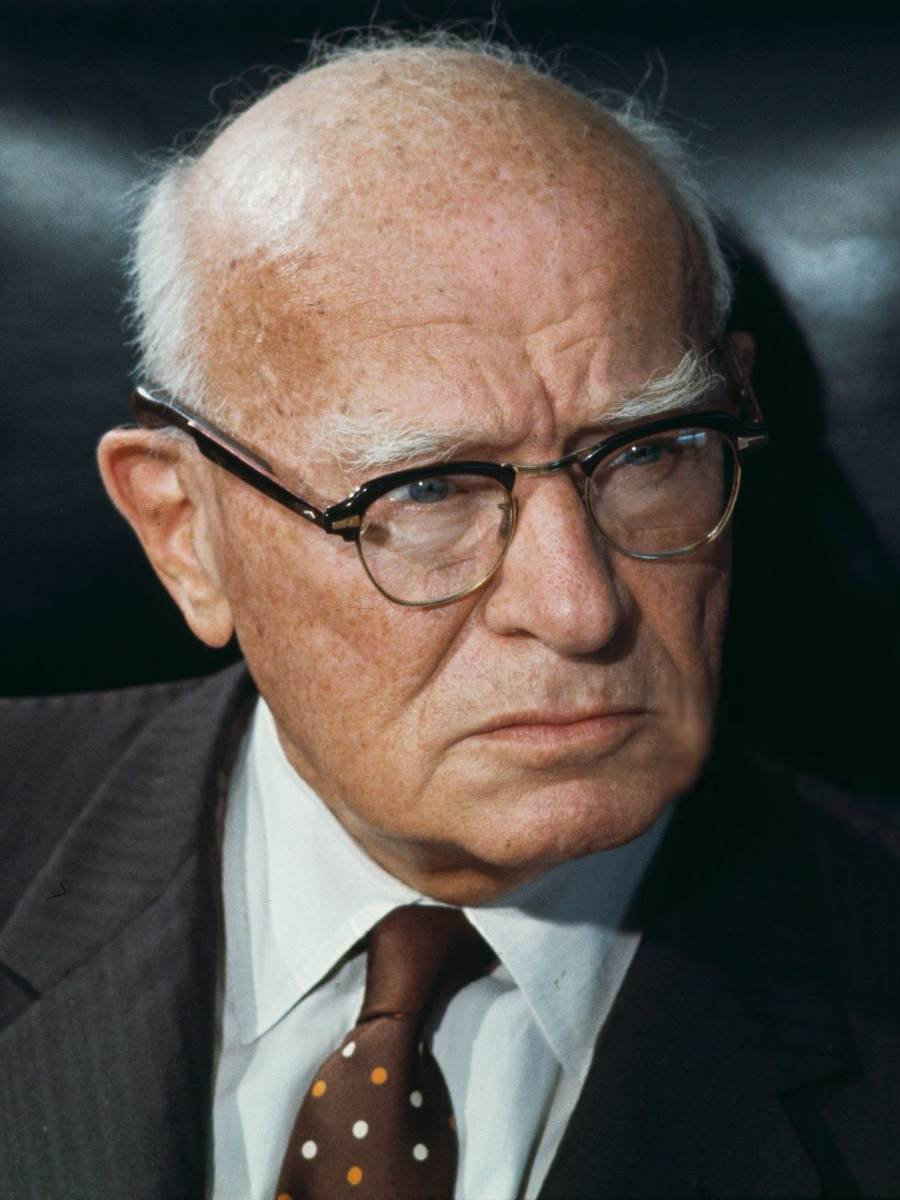
- Celler in 1967

39th Dean of the United States House of Representatives
- In office January 3, 1965 – January 3, 1973
- Preceded by: Carl Vinson
- Succeeded by: Wright Patman

Chair of the House Judiciary Committee
- In office January 3, 1955 – January 3, 1973
- Preceded by: Chauncey W. Reed
- Succeeded by: Peter W. Rodino
- In office January 3, 1949 – January 3, 1953
- Preceded by: Earl C. Michener
- Succeeded by: Chauncey W. Reed

Member of the U.S. House of Representatives from New York
- In office March 4, 1923 – January 3, 1973
- Preceded by: Lester D. Volk
- Succeeded by: Elizabeth Holtzman
- Constituency: 10th district (1923–1945); 15th district (1945–1953); 11th district (1953–1963); 10th district (1963–1973)

Personal details
- Born: May 6, 1888 Brooklyn, New York, U.S.
- Died: January 15, 1981 (aged 92) New York City, U.S.
- Party: Democratic
- Education: Columbia University (BA, LLB)
- Occupation: Lawyer

Emanuel Celler (May 6, 1888 – January 15, 1981) was an American attorney and Democratic politician from New York who represented parts of the New York City boroughs of Brooklyn and Queens in the United States House of Representatives for nearly 50 years, from March 1923 to January 1973. He served as the dean of the United States House of Representatives from 1965 to 1973. Celler chaired the House Committee on the Judiciary for eleven terms between 1949 and 1973 and was a leading advocate for the liberalization of immigration and naturalization laws, from his early stand against the Immigration Act of 1924 to his sponsorship of the Immigration and Nationality Act of 1965, which dramatically increased and diversified immigration to the United States. He ranks as the fifth longest-serving congressman in United States history (Note: Only John Dingell, Jamie Whitten, John Conyers, and Carl Vinson served longer.) and the longest-serving member of either house of Congress in New York state history.

Celler strongly supported help for Jewish refugees fleeing Europe during World War II. As chair of the House Judiciary Committee for all but two years between 1949 and 1973, he ushered the major civil rights legislation including the Civil Rights Act of 1964, Voting Rights Act of 1965, and the Immigration and Nationality Act of 1965.

In the early 1970s, Celler opposed the Equal Rights Amendment. He was defeated in the 1972 primary by Elizabeth Holtzman, becoming the most senior member of the House of Representatives ever to lose a party primary.

== Early life ==
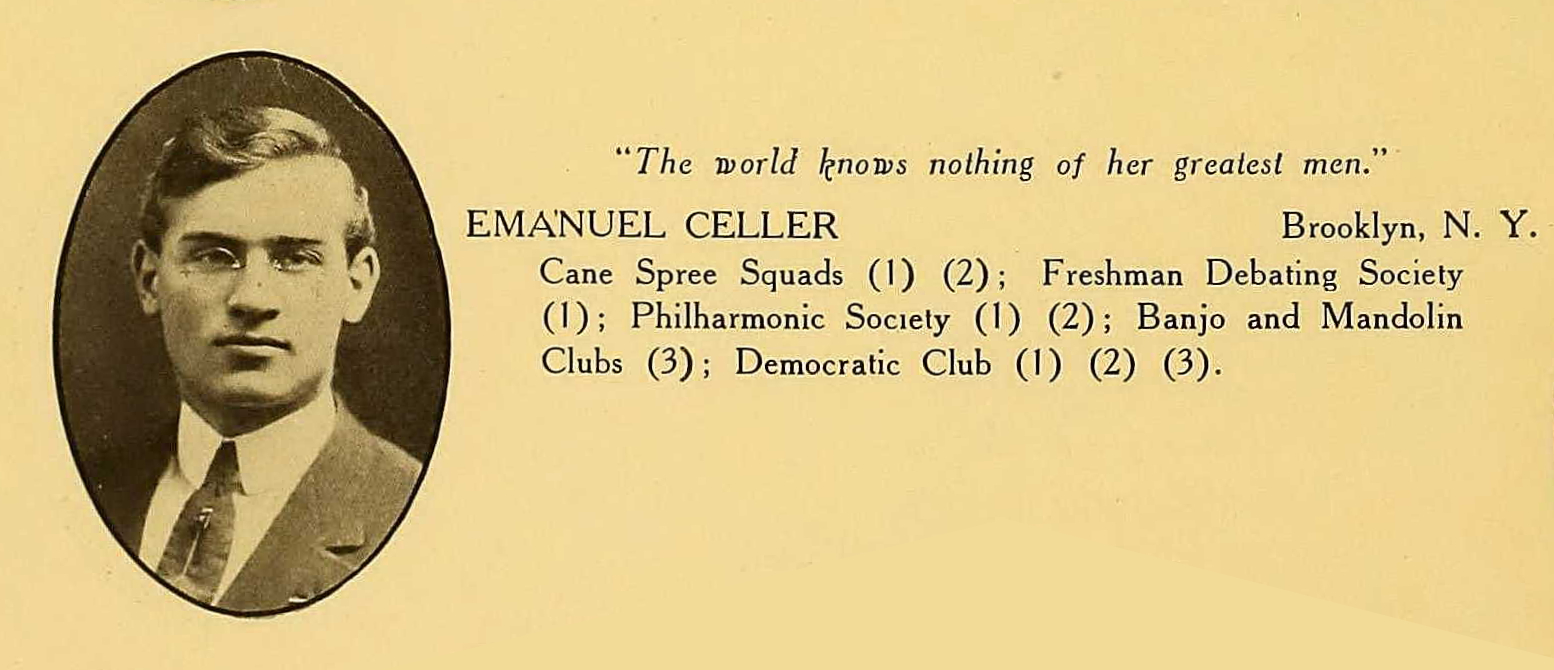
Celler in the Columbia University yearbook, 1910

Emanuel Celler was born on May 6, 1888, in Brooklyn, New York. His parents, Josephine (née Müller) and Henry H. Celler, were each the children of German immigrants. His paternal grandparents and maternal grandmother were Jewish, and his maternal grandfather was Catholic. He retrospectively described his family as "respectable and middle-class." his father operated a whiskey business that ultimately failed, compelling him to opt for a job as a wine salesman, which Celler inherited upon his father's abrupt death in 1910.

Celler graduated from Boys High School in Brooklyn in 1906 and studied at Columbia College, graduating in 1910, and Columbia Law School, graduating to 1912. Following his admission to the New York bar, he was involved in the examinatio of draft appeals during World War I.

== United States House of Representatives (1923–73) ==
Celler was first elected to the House in 1922, defeating incumbent Republican Lester D. Volk.

As a representative-elect in December 1922, Celler forcefully criticized the Second Ku Klux Klan as "a national menace," a "cancer and disease that is harassing our body politic," and "worse than Bolshevism."

During his first twenty-two years in Congress, 1923–1945, Celler's Brooklyn and Queens-based district was numbered as New York's 10th congressional district. Redistricting in 1944 put him into the 15th district from 1945 to 1953; from 1953 to 1963 his district was the 11th; and for his final decade in the United States Congress, 1963–1973, it was back to its 1922 designation as the 10th. For his final campaign in 1972, the district had been renumbered as the 16th.

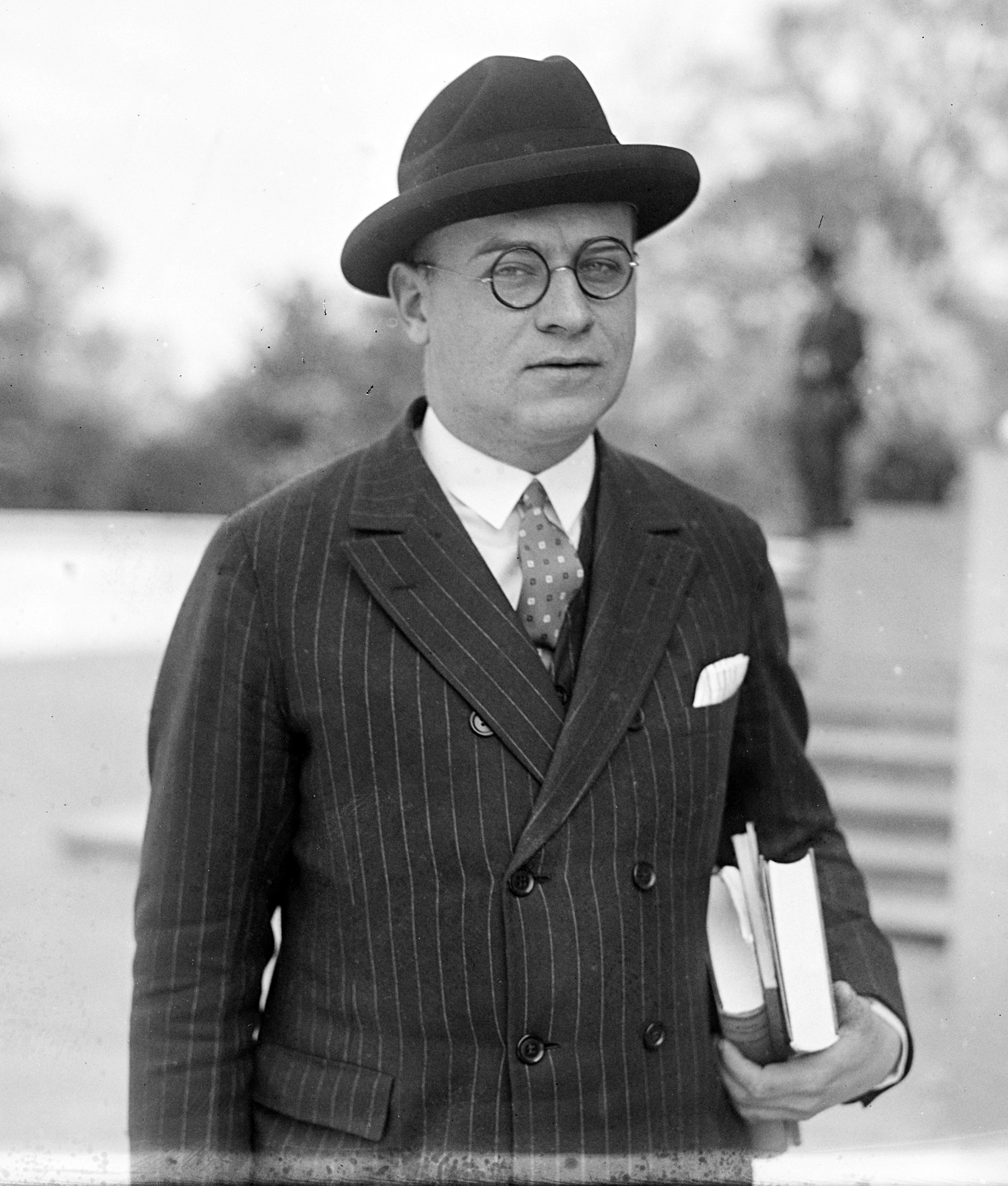
Emanuel Celler in 1924

Celler made his first important speech on the House floor during consideration of the Johnson–Reed Immigration Act of 1924. Three years earlier, Congress had imposed a quota that limited immigration for persons of any nationality to 3 percent of that nationality present in the United States in 1910, with an annual admission limit of 356,000 immigrants. This national origin system was structured to preserve the ethnic and religious identity of the United States by reducing immigration from Eastern and Southern Europe, thereby excluding many Jews, Catholics, among others. Celler was vehemently opposed to the Johnson-Reed Act, which passed the isolationist Congress and was signed into law. Celler had found his cause and for the next four decades he vigorously spoke out in favor of eliminating the national origin quotas as a basis for immigration restriction.

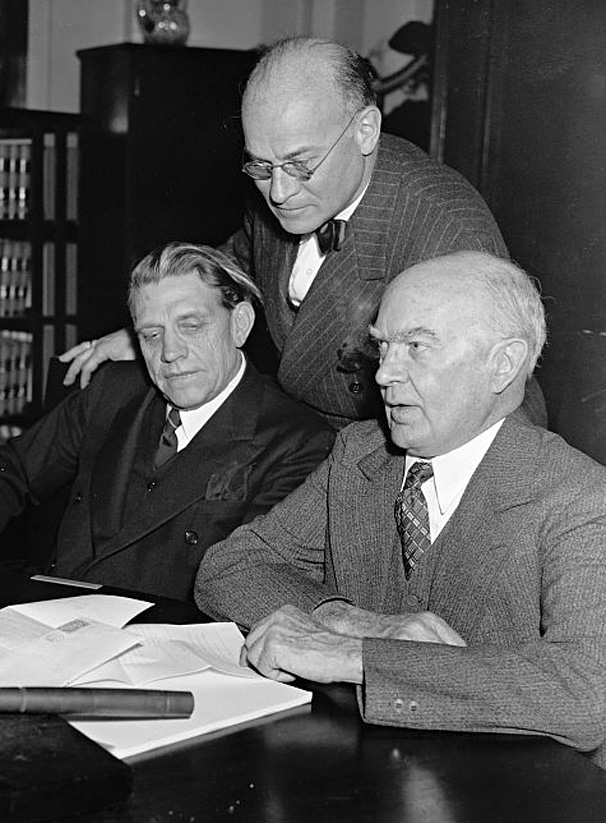
U.S. Guyer (left), Emanuel Celler (center), and Hatton W. Sumners (right) in 1937

In July 1939, a strongly worded letter from Celler to U.S. Secretary of State Cordell Hull helped set in motion an extremely prolonged process of 45 years that finally led in 1984, three years after Celler's death, to full, formal diplomatic relations between the United States and the Holy See.

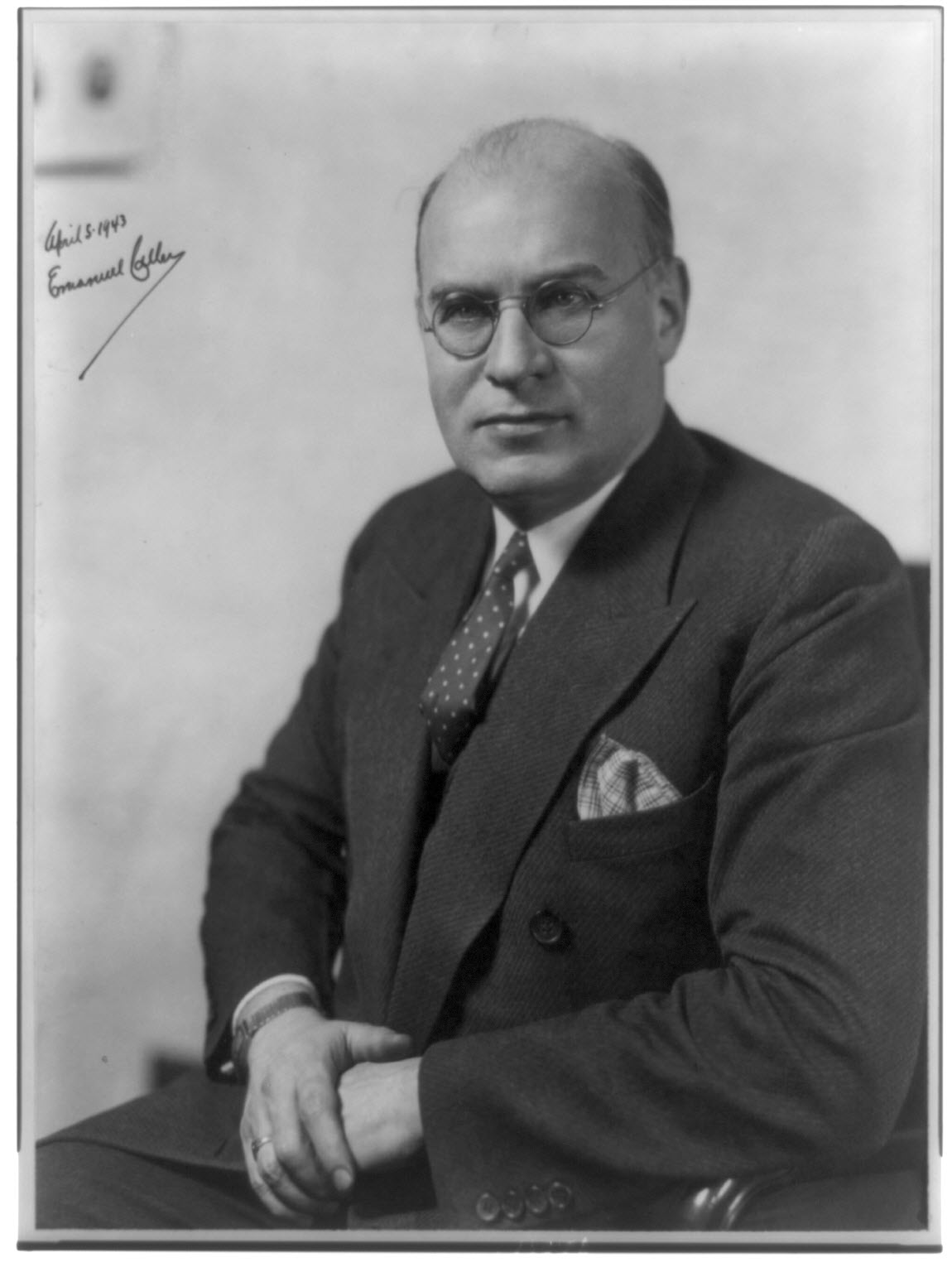
Emanuel Celler in 1943

In the 1940s, Celler opposed both the isolationists and the Franklin D. Roosevelt administration by forcefully advocating that the United States relax immigration laws on an emergency basis to rescue those fleeing the Holocaust. In 1943, he called President Roosevelt's immigration policy "cold and cruel" and blasted the "glacier-like attitude" of the State Department. Celler was also a Zionist who supported the recognition of Israel and requested the lifting of the American embargo imposed on both sides during the 1948 Palestine war.

In 1950, he was the lead House sponsor of legislation to strengthen the Clayton Antitrust Act of 1914; the bill, written with Tennessee Senator Estes Kefauver, became the Celler-Kefauver Act, which closed key regulatory loopholes, empowering the government to prevent vertical mergers and conglomerate mergers which could limit competition.

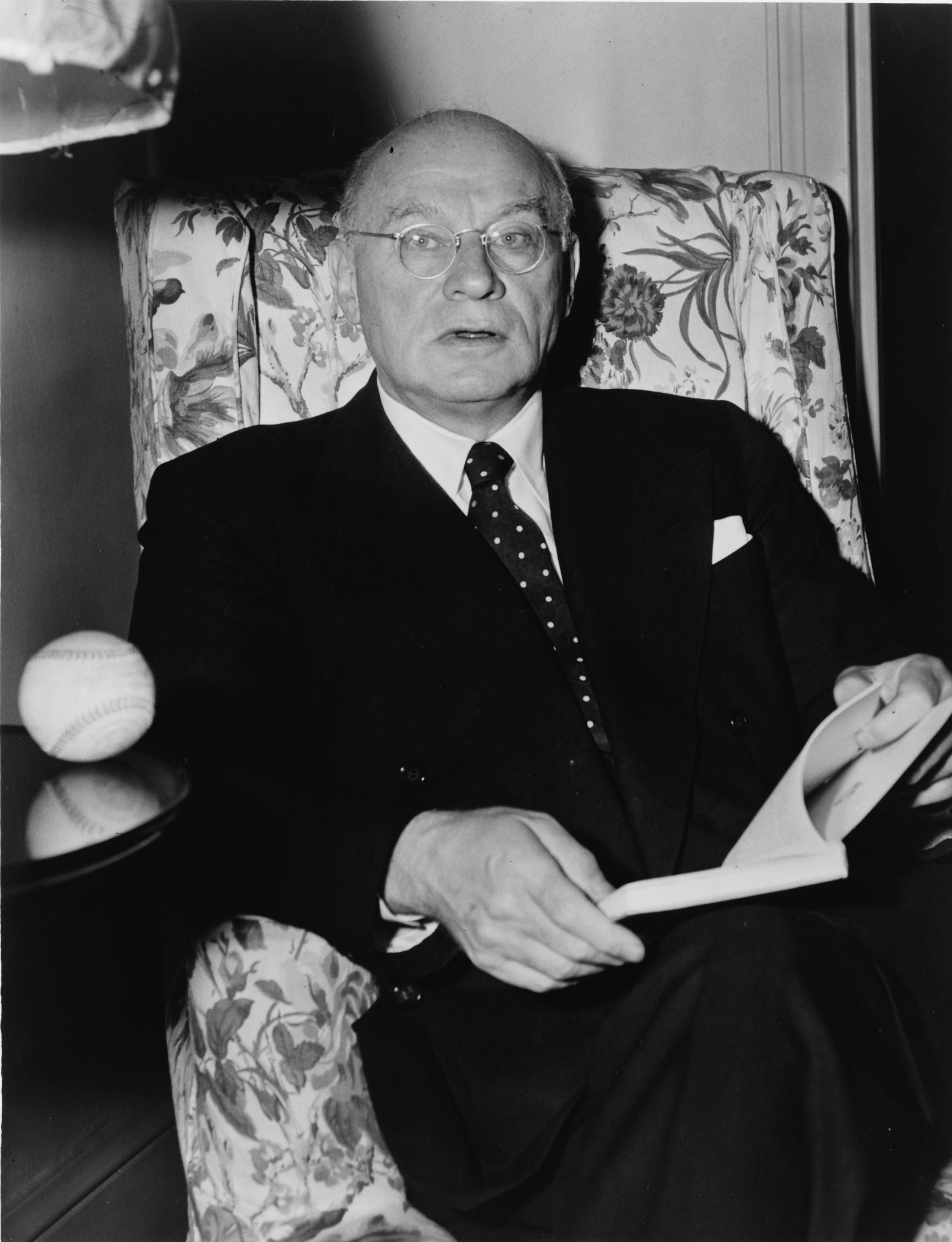
Emanuel Celler in 1951

In 1951, Celler conducted hearings in the United States House Judiciary Committee to examine the anti-trust exemption granted to Major League Baseball (MLB). Celler entered the hearings believing that MLB needed laws to support the reserve clause. Star players, such as Lou Boudreau and Pee Wee Reese, indicated their support of the reserve clause. Minor league veteran Ross Horning testified about his experiences in baseball, which he said were more common for rank-and-file players. Cy Block, who appeared briefly in the major leagues, testified about his experiences and how the reserve clause prevented him from getting an extended trial in the major leagues. Celler's final report suggested that the Congress should take no action, allowing for the matter to be settled in the federal judiciary of the United States. In 1953, the Supreme Court of the United States upheld MLB's anti-trust exemption and the reserve clause in Toolson v. New York Yankees, Inc..

In the early 1950s, the Republican Senator Joseph McCarthy attacked Celler's patriotism. At the 1952 Democratic National Convention, Celler gave a speech in which he responded to Sen. McCarthy, saying:

"Deliberately and calculatedly, McCarthyism has set before itself the task of undermining the faith of the people in their Government. It has undertaken to sow suspicion everywhere, to set friend against friend and brother against brother. It deals in coercion and in intimidation, tying the hands of citizens and officials with the fear of the smear attack."

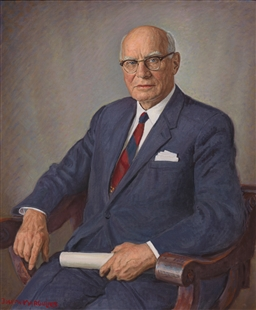
Celler's Judiciary Committee portrait by Joseph Margulies, 1963

As Chairman of the House Judiciary Committee from 1949 to 1973 (except for a break from 1953 to 1955 when the Republicans controlled the House), Celler was involved in drafting and passing the Civil Rights Act of 1964, the Civil Rights Act of 1968 and the Voting Rights Act of 1965. He worked closely with Rep. William Moore McCulloch (R-OH), the Ranking Member, to craft sufficient bipartisan support in the House to overwhelm Southern Democrat opposition in the Senate. In January 1965, Celler proposed in the House of Representatives the Twenty-fifth Amendment, which clarifies an ambiguous provision of the Constitution regarding succession to the presidency. Also in 1965, he proposed and steered to passage the Hart-Celler Act, which eliminated national origins as a consideration for immigration. This was the culminating moment in Celler's 41-year fight to overcome restriction on immigration to the United States based on national origin. The U.S. Gun Control Act of 1968 directly evolved from Celler's Bill H.R. 17735.

=== 1972 Democratic primary defeat ===
In June 1972, Celler (then the House of Representatives' most senior member) unexpectedly lost the Democratic primary to a somewhat more liberal Democrat, attorney Elizabeth Holtzman, who eked out a 635-vote victory over Celler, based chiefly on Celler's opposition to feminism and the Equal Rights Amendment. At the time, Celler was the most senior congressman ever to have been ousted in a primary. Even though Celler remained on the ballot as the candidate of the Liberal Party, he decided not to campaign and endorsed Holtzman in September. This allowed Holtzman to win the general election that November with 66% of the vote, versus 23% for her Republican opponent. Celler received 7%.

== Final years ==
In his final years, Celler remained busy, speaking about immigration and myriad other topics that occupied his half-century of public service. During the Watergate scandal of 1973–1974, he was a frequent guest on television and radio programs, discussing the hearings and the position of Chairman of the Judiciary Committee, which he held for a record number of years. If not for his electoral loss a few months before, Celler, not Peter Rodino of New Jersey, would have been conducting the hearings. Celler was on good terms with Richard Nixon and in the early part of the hearings indicated that he would have taken a less adversarial position than Rodino.

In 1978, shortly before his 90th birthday, he granted an interview in which he reflected on New York and national politicians.

=== Death ===
Emanuel Celler died in his home in Brooklyn on Jan 15, 1981 at the age of 92.

== See also ==
- List of Jewish members of the United States Congress

== Publications ==
=== Books ===
- —— (1953). You Never Leave Brooklyn: The Autobiography of Emanuel Celler. New York: John Day Co.

=== Academic publications ===
- —— (1952). "Congressional Apportionment—Past, Present, and Future". Law and Contemporary Problems. 17 (2): 268–275.
- —— (March 1961). "The Seniority Rule in Congress". The Western Political Quarterly. 14 (1): 160–167.
- —— (July 1961). "The Antimerger Act: An Estimate of Its Impact". American Bar Association Journal. 47 (7): 692–697.

=== Magazine articles ===
- —— (September 1941). "Jews in Government Employ". The Atlantic Monthly. Vol. 168, no. 3. pp. 289–292.
- —— (1950). "Case for the Clayton Act Amendments". Fortune. Vol. 41. p. 77.

U.S. House of Representatives
Preceded by Lester D. Volk	Member of the U.S. House of Representatives from New York's 10th congressional district 1923–1945	Succeeded by Andrew L. Somers
Preceded by Thomas F. Burchill	Member of the U.S. House of Representatives from New York's 15th congressional district 1945–1953	Succeeded by John H. Ray
Preceded by James J. Heffernan	Member of the U.S. House of Representatives from New York's 11th congressional district 1953–1963	Succeeded by Eugene Keogh
Preceded by Edna F. Kelly	Member of the U.S. House of Representatives from New York's 10th congressional district 1963–1973	Succeeded by Mario Biaggi
Political offices
Preceded by Earl Michener (1st time), Chauncey Reed (2nd time)	Chairman of the House Judiciary Committee; 1949–1953, 1955–1973	Succeeded by Chauncey Reed (1st time), Peter Rodino (2nd time)
Honorary titles
Preceded by Carl Vinson	Dean of the House; 1965–1973	Succeeded by Wright Patman
Preceded by William L. Dawson	Oldest member of the U.S. House of Representatives; 1970–1973	Succeeded by Ray Madden
