= Federal Baseball Club v. National League =

- Supreme Court of the United States

Argued April 19, 1922 Decided May 29, 1922
- Full case name: Federal Base Ball Club of Baltimore, Inc. v. National League of Professional Base Ball Clubs, et al.
- Citations: 259 U.S. 200 (more) 42 S. Ct. 465; 66 L. Ed. 898

Holding
- Major League Baseball is not considered interstate commerce under the Sherman Antitrust Act.

Court membership
- Chief Justice William H. Taft Associate Justices Joseph McKenna · Oliver W. Holmes Jr. William R. Day · Willis Van Devanter; Mahlon Pitney · James C. McReynolds; Louis Brandeis · John H. Clarke

Case opinion
- Majority: Holmes, joined by unanimous

Laws applied
- Sherman Antitrust Act

Federal Baseball Club v. National League, 259 U.S. 200 (1922), is a case in which the U.S. Supreme Court ruled that the Sherman Antitrust Act did not apply to Major League Baseball.

== Background ==
After the Federal League folded in 1915, most of the Federal League owners had been bought out by owners in the other major leagues, or had been compensated in other ways. For example, the owner of the St. Louis Terriers of the Federal League had been permitted to buy the St. Louis Browns of the American League. The owner of the Baltimore Terrapins had not been compensated, and sued the National League, the American League and other defendants, including several Federal League officials for conspiring to monopolize baseball by destroying the Federal League. In 1919, the defendants were found jointly liable, and damages of $80,000 assessed, which was tripled to $240,000 under the provisions of the Clayton Antitrust Act.

== Judgment ==
=== Court of Appeals ===
The Court of Appeals reversed the trial verdict, and held that baseball was not subject to the Sherman Act. The case was appealed to the Supreme Court.

=== Supreme Court ===
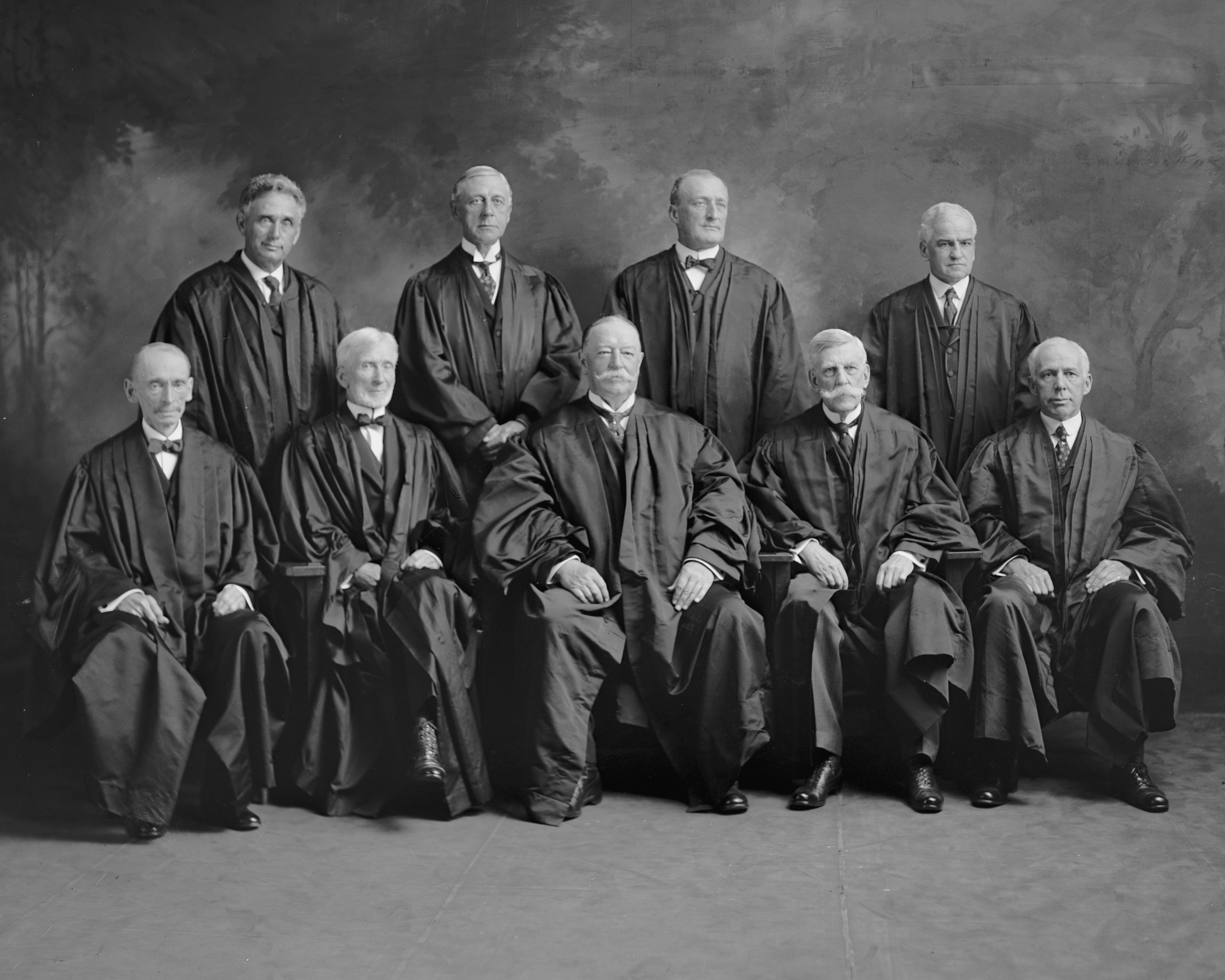
Taft Court in 1921.

In a unanimous decision written by Justice Oliver Wendell Holmes, the Court affirmed the Court of Appeals, holding that "the business is giving exhibitions of base ball, which are purely state affairs"; that is, that baseball was not interstate commerce for the purposes of the Sherman Act. Justice Holmes' decision was as follows:

The decision of the Court of Appeals went to the root of the case, and, if correct, makes it unnecessary to consider other serious difficulties in the way of the plaintiff's recovery. A summary statement of the nature of the business involved will be enough to present the point. The clubs composing the Leagues are in different cities and for the most part in different states. The end of the elaborate organizations and sub-organizations that are described in the pleadings and evidence is that these clubs shall play against one another in public exhibitions for money, one or the other club crossing a state line in order to make the meeting possible. When, as the result of these contests, one club has won the pennant of its league and another club has won the pennant of the other league, there is a final competition for the world's championship between these two. Of course, the scheme requires constantly repeated traveling on the part of the clubs, which is provided for, controlled, and disciplined by the organizations, and this, it is said, means commerce among the states. But we are of opinion that the Court of Appeals was right.

The business is giving exhibitions of baseball, which are purely state affairs. It is true that, in order to attain for these exhibitions the great popularity that they have achieved, competitions must be arranged between clubs from different cities and states. But the fact that, in order to give the exhibitions, the Leagues must induce free persons to cross state lines and must arrange and pay for their doing so is not enough to change the character of the business. According to the distinction insisted upon in Hooper v. California, 155 U. S. 648, 155 U. S. 655, the transport is a mere incident, not the essential thing. That to which it is incident, the exhibition, although made for money, would not be called trade of commerce in the commonly accepted use of those words. As it is put by defendant, personal effort not related to production is not a subject of commerce. That which in its consummation is not commerce does not become commerce among the states because the transportation that we have mentioned takes place. To repeat the illustrations given by the court below, a firm of lawyers sending out a member to argue a case, or the Chautauqua lecture bureau sending out lecturers, does not engage in such commerce because the lawyer or lecturer goes to another state.

If we are right, the plaintiff's business is to be described in the same way, and the restrictions by contract that prevented the plaintiff from getting players to break their bargains and the other conduct charged against the defendants were not an interference with commerce among the states.

== Significance ==
This case is the main reason why MLB has not faced any competitor leagues since 1922, and MLB, to date, remains the only American sports league with such an antitrust exemption.

The case was reaffirmed in Toolson v. New York Yankees, Inc.

In Flood v. Kuhn, the Court partially reversed, and found Major League Baseball to be engaged in interstate commerce. However, the justices refused to overturn baseball's original antitrust exemption from Federal Baseball, deeming it necessary to preserve precedent: in addition to Toolson, the case had already been heavily cited in Shubert, International Boxing, and Radovich.

In 2016's Direct Marketing Association v. Brohl, the Tenth Circuit's Neil Gorsuch cited Federal Baseball and Toolson in his concurrence as one of the "precedential islands", along with Bellas Hess, that] manage[s] to survive indefinitely even when surrounded by a sea of contrary law…. [that] would never expand but would, if anything, wash away with the tides of time".

== See also ==
- 1922 in baseball
- Baseball law
- List of United States Supreme Court cases, volume 259
