= List of United States Supreme Court cases, volume 259 =

Supreme Court of the United States
- Interactive map of Supreme Court of the United States
- 38°53′26″N 77°00′16″W
- Established: March 4, 1789; 237 years ago
- Location: Washington, D.C.
- Coordinates: 38°53′26″N 77°00′16″W
- Composition method: Presidential nomination with Senate confirmation
- Authorised by: Constitution of the United States, Art. III, § 1
- Judge term length: life tenure, subject to impeachment and removal
- Number of positions: 9 (by statute)
- Website: supremecourt.gov

This is a list of cases reported in volume 259 of United States Reports, decided by the Supreme Court of the United States in 1922.

== Justices of the Supreme Court at the time of volume 259 U.S. ==
The Supreme Court is established by Article III, Section 1 of the Constitution of the United States, which says: "The judicial Power of the United States, shall be vested in one supreme Court . . .". The size of the Court is not specified; the Constitution leaves it to Congress to set the number of justices. Under the Judiciary Act of 1789 Congress originally fixed the number of justices at six (one chief justice and five associate justices). Since 1789 Congress has varied the size of the Court from six to seven, nine, ten, and back to nine justices (always including one chief justice).

When the cases in volume 259 were decided the Court comprised the following nine members:

Portrait	Justice	Office	Home State	Succeeded	Date confirmed by the Senate (Vote)	Tenure on Supreme Court
	William Howard Taft	Chief Justice	Connecticut	Edward Douglass White	June 30, 1921 (Acclamation)	July 11, 1921 – February 3, 1930 (Retired)
	Joseph McKenna	Associate Justice	California	Stephen Johnson Field	January 21, 1898 (Acclamation)	January 26, 1898 – January 5, 1925 (Retired)
	Oliver Wendell Holmes Jr.	Associate Justice	Massachusetts	Horace Gray	December 4, 1902 (Acclamation)	December 8, 1902 – January 12, 1932 (Retired)
	William R. Day	Associate Justice	Ohio	George Shiras Jr.	February 23, 1903 (Acclamation)	March 2, 1903 – November 13, 1922 (Retired)
	Willis Van Devanter	Associate Justice	Wyoming	Edward Douglass White (as Associate Justice)	December 15, 1910 (Acclamation)	January 3, 1911 – June 2, 1937 (Retired)
	Mahlon Pitney	Associate Justice	New Jersey	John Marshall Harlan	March 13, 1912 (50–26)	March 18, 1912 – December 31, 1922 (Resigned)
	James Clark McReynolds	Associate Justice	Tennessee	Horace Harmon Lurton	August 29, 1914 (44–6)	October 12, 1914 – January 31, 1941 (Retired)
	Louis Brandeis	Associate Justice	Massachusetts	Joseph Rucker Lamar	June 1, 1916 (47–22)	June 5, 1916 – February 13, 1939 (Retired)
	John Hessin Clarke	Associate Justice	Ohio	Charles Evans Hughes	July 24, 1916 (Acclamation)	October 9, 1916 – September 18, 1922 (Retired)

== Notable cases in 259 U.S. ==
=== Child Labor Tax Case ===
In Bailey v. Drexel Furniture Co., 259 U.S. 20 (1922), the Supreme Court ruled that the 1919 Child Labor Tax Law was unconstitutional as an improper attempt by Congress to penalize employers using child labor. The Court concluded that the "tax" imposed by the statute was not a tax, but a penalty in disguise.

=== Federal Baseball Club of Baltimore, Inc. v. National League of Professional Baseball Clubs ===
Federal Baseball Club v. National League, 259 U.S. 200 (1922), is an antitrust decision in which the Supreme Court ruled the Sherman Antitrust Act did not apply to Major League Baseball because baseball was not deemed to be interstate commerce. This decision is the main reason why MLB has not faced any competitor leagues since 1922 and MLB, to date, remains the only professional sports league in the United States with such an antitrust exemption.

=== Ng Fung Ho v. White ===
In Ng Fung Ho v. White, 259 U.S. 276 (1922), the Supreme Court held that habeas corpus petitioners are entitled to a de novo judicial hearing to adjudicate claims that they are citizens of the United States.

== Citation style ==
Under the Judiciary Act of 1789 the federal court structure at the time comprised District Courts, which had general trial jurisdiction; Circuit Courts, which had mixed trial and appellate (from the US District Courts) jurisdiction; and the United States Supreme Court, which had appellate jurisdiction over the federal District and Circuit courts—and for certain issues over state courts. The Supreme Court also had limited original jurisdiction (i.e., in which cases could be filed directly with the Supreme Court without first having been heard by a lower federal or state court). There were one or more federal District Courts and/or Circuit Courts in each state, territory, or other geographical region.

The Judiciary Act of 1891 created the United States Courts of Appeals and reassigned the jurisdiction of most routine appeals from the district and circuit courts to these appellate courts. The Act created nine new courts that were originally known as the "United States Circuit Courts of Appeals." The new courts had jurisdiction over most appeals of lower court decisions. The Supreme Court could review either legal issues that a court of appeals certified or decisions of court of appeals by writ of certiorari. On January 1, 1912, the effective date of the Judicial Code of 1911, the old Circuit Courts were abolished, with their remaining trial court jurisdiction transferred to the U.S. District Courts.

Bluebook citation style is used for case names, citations, and jurisdictions.

- "# Cir." = United States Court of Appeals
  - e.g., "3d Cir." = United States Court of Appeals for the Third Circuit
- "D." = United States District Court for the District of . . .
  - e.g.,"D. Mass." = United States District Court for the District of Massachusetts
- "E." = Eastern; "M." = Middle; "N." = Northern; "S." = Southern; "W." = Western
  - e.g.,"M.D. Ala." = United States District Court for the Middle District of Alabama
- "Ct. Cl." = United States Court of Claims
- The abbreviation of a state's name alone indicates the highest appellate court in that state's judiciary at the time.
  - e.g.,"Pa." = Supreme Court of Pennsylvania
  - e.g.,"Me." = Supreme Judicial Court of Maine

== List of cases in volume 259 U.S. ==
Case Name	Page and year	Opinion of the Court	Concurring opinion(s)	Dissenting opinion(s)	Lower Court	Disposition
British Columbia Mills Tug and Barge Company v. Myrolie	1 (1922)	Taft	none	none	9th Cir.	affirmed
Atherton Mills v. Johnston	13 (1922)	Taft	none	none	W.D.N.C.	reversed
Bailey, Collector of Internal Revenue v. George	16 (1922)	Taft	none	none	W.D.N.C.	reversed
Child Labor Tax Case	20 (1922)	Taft	none	none	W.D.N.C.	affirmed
Hill v. Wallace	44 (1922)	Taft	Brandeis	none	N.D. Ill.	reversed
American Smelting and Refining Company v. United States	75 (1922)	Holmes	none	none	Ct. Cl.	affirmed
Grogan v. Hiram Walker and Sons, Ltd.	80 (1922)	Holmes	none	McKenna	E.D. Mich.	multiple
South Covington and Cincinnati Street Railway Company v. City of Newport	97 (1922)	McReynolds	none	none	E.D. Ky.	reversed
Newton v. New York and Queens Gas Company	101 (1922)	McReynolds	none	none	S.D.N.Y.	reversed
Union Tool Company v. Wilson	107 (1922)	Brandeis	none	none	9th Cir.	affirmed
Heald v. District of Columbia	114 (1922)	Brandeis	none	none	D.C. Cir.	affirmed
Pierce Oil Corporation v. Phoenix Refining Company	125 (1922)	Clarke	none	none	Okla.	affirmed
Ewert v. Bluejacket	129 (1922)	Clarke	none	none	8th Cir.	multiple
Kendall v. Ewert	139 (1922)	Clarke	none	none	8th Cir.	reversed
Rainier Brewing Company v. Great Northern Pacific Steamship Company	150 (1922)	Clarke	none	none	9th Cir.	affirmed
Continental Insurance Company v. United States	156 (1922)	Taft	none	none	E.D. Pa.	affirmed
California Industrial Accident Commission v. Davis	182 (1922)	McKenna	none	none	Cal. Ct. App.	reversed
Morrisdale Coal Company v. United States	188 (1922)	Holmes	none	none	Ct. Cl.	affirmed
Pine Hill Coal Company, Inc. v. United States	191 (1922)	Holmes	none	none	Ct. Cl.	affirmed
Santa Fe Pacific Railroad Company v. Fall	197 (1922)	Holmes	none	none	D.C. Cir.	reversed
Federal Baseball Club of Baltimore, Inc. v. National League of Professional Baseball Clubs	200 (1922)	Holmes	none	none	D.C. Cir.	affirmed
Mutual Life Insurance Company of New York v. Liebing	209 (1922)	Holmes	none	none	Mo.	affirmed
United States v. Southern Pacific Company	214 (1922)	Day	none	McKenna	D. Utah	reversed
Miles v. Safe Deposit and Trust Company	247 (1922)	Pitney	none	none	D. Md.	affirmed
Carlisle Packing Company v. Sandanger	255 (1922)	McReynolds	none	none	Wash.	affirmed
Olin v. Kitzmiller	260 (1922)	McReynolds	none	none	9th Cir.	affirmed
State Industrial Commission of New York v. Nordenholt Corporation	263 (1922)	McReynolds	none	none	N.Y. Sup. Ct.	reversed
Ng Fung Ho v. White	276 (1922)	Brandeis	none	none	9th Cir.	multiple
Great Northern Railroad Company v. Merchants Elevator Company	285 (1922)	Brandeis	none	none	Minn.	affirmed
Fidelity and Deposit Company of Maryland v. United States	296 (1922)	Brandeis	none	none	Ct. Cl.	remanded
Fidelity Title and Trust Company v. United States	304 (1922)	Brandeis	none	none	Ct. Cl.	affirmed
Collins v. Loisel	309 (1922)	Brandeis	none	none	E.D. La.	affirmed
City of Houston v. Southwestern Bell Telephone Company	318 (1922)	Clarke	none	none	S.D. Tex.	affirmed
United States ex rel. French v. Weeks, Secretary of War	326 (1922)	Clarke	none	none	D.C. Cir.	affirmed
United States ex rel. Creary v. Weeks, Secretary of War	336 (1922)	Clarke	none	none	D.C. Cir.	affirmed
United Mine Workers of America v. Coronado Coal Company	344 (1922)	Taft	none	none	8th Cir.	reversed
Ex parte Harley-Davidson Motor Company	414 (1922)	Day	none	none	3d Cir.	mandamus granted
Wyoming v. Colorado	419 (1922)	VanDevanter	none	none	original	riparian rights set
Weiland v. Pioneer Irrigation Company	498 (1922)	Clarke	none	none	8th Cir.	affirmed
Ward and Gow v. Krinsky	503 (1922)	Pitney	none	McReynolds	N.Y. Sup. Ct.	affirmed
Prudential Insurance Company of America v. Cheek	530 (1922)\	Pitney	none	none	Mo. Ct. App.	affirmed
Chicago, Rock Island and Pacific Railroad Company v. Perry	548 (1922)	Pitney	none	none	Okla.	affirmed
Lipke v. Lederer	557 (1922)	McReynolds	none	Brandeis	E.D. Pa.	reversed
Georgia v. South Carolina	572 (1922)	per curiam	none	none	original	boundary set
