= Frank L. McNamee =

American businessman and government official (1905–1995)

- Born: Francis Leo McNamee; February 3, 1892; Butler County, Pennsylvania, U.S.
- Died: November 6, 1974 (aged 82); Cleveland, Ohio, U.S.
- Education: Washington & Jefferson College; University of Pittsburgh School of Law
- Occupation: Movie theater owner President of United Artists President of the Philadelphia Eagles Commissioner of the Philadelphia Fire Department
- Years active: 1923–1964

Francis Leo McNamee (February 3, 1892 – November 6, 1974) was an American businessman and government official who was regional director of the War Manpower Commission, president of United Artists and the Philadelphia Eagles, and commissioner of the Philadelphia Fire Department.

== Early life ==
McNamee was born in Butler County, Pennsylvania, on February 3, 1892. He attended public school in Butler, Pennsylvania, and graduated from Washington & Jefferson College in 1915 and the University of Pittsburgh School of Law in 1918. He enlisted in the United States Army in 1918 and was assigned to the officer's training school at Camp Taylor, Louisville.

== Early career ==
In 1923, McNamee joined RKO Pictures as a branch manager based out of Washington D.C. He then worked as a salesman for Universal Pictures until 1932, when he became manager of RKO's Philadelphia branch, which covered Pennsylvania, New Jersey, and Delaware. In 1940, he became a partner of theatre manager Jay Emanuel. They owned and operated around 125 theaters and hotels, including the Rajah in Reading, Pennsylvania.

== World War II ==
In 1943, McNamee was appointed regional director of the War Manpower Commission for Pennsylvania, New Jersey, and Delaware. In August 1943, McNamee instituted a mandatory 48-hour work week in the Newark, New Jersey, area due to labor shortages. In August 1944, he order a 48-hour work week for the Philadelphia–Camden, New Jersey, area as well.

Due to the labor shortage in the city, McNamee ordered the Philadelphia Transportation Company to upgrade black employees to operating jobs. This led to a strike by white transit workers. McNamee refused to rescind his order and later issued an order barring any employer from hiring any PTC employee. The PTC was taken over by the United States Army under the authority of the Smith–Connally Act and the strike was resolved after Major General Philip Hayes directed strikers to return to work or lose their military draft deferments.

In 1944, McNamee was chosen by WMC chairman Paul V. McNutt to act as the agency's assistant deputy director while Vernon A. McGee was on vacation. From January to September 1945, McNamee was the deputy chairman of the War Manpower Commission.

In 1946, McNamee was appointed regional director of the War Assets Administration. He oversaw the sale of surplus military equipment and property in the Philadelphia area, including 125 factories and the Millville Army Air Field.

== Philadelphia Eagles ==
In 1949, McNamee was part of a syndicate, nicknamed the Happy Hundred, that purchased the Philadelphia Eagles from Alexis "Lex" Thompson for $250,000. In 1953, he succeeded majority shareholder James P. Clark as team president. McNamee also served as secretary of Clark's Liberty Bell Park Racetrack until Pennsylvania passed a law prohibiting public officials from operating horse tracks.

In 1958, the Eagles moved from Connie Mack Stadium to Franklin Field after McNamee reached a deal with the University of Pennsylvania. The Eagles were allowed to play at the stadium rent free, but made donations toward the maintenance of the field and allowed Penn to keep revenue from parking and concessions. The Eagles played the 1960 NFL Championship Game at Franklin Field and defeated the Green Bay Packers 17–13. In 1960, McNamee was one of four owners who blocked Marshall Leahy's appointment as Commissioner of the National Football League due to his desire to remain in San Francisco and move the league office to the west coast. After an eight-day deadlock, Leahy's supporters finally gave in and Los Angeles Rams general manager Pete Rozelle was elected as a compromise candidate. McNamee disagreed with Rozelle's decision to have the league play its normal schedule of games following the assassination of John F. Kennedy. McNamee refused to attend the game in favor of a memorial service at nearby Independence Hall, stating that "the game is being played by order of the commissioner". In December 1963, the "Happy Hundred" sold the club to Jerry Wolman for $5,505,000.

== United Artists ==
In 1950, McNutt led a syndicate that obtained control of United Artists. He reorganized the company with himself as chairman and McNamee as president and treasurer. The pair were unable to turn around the struggling company, which reportedly lost around $25,000 a week under their management. In 1951, management of UA was acquired by Arthur B. Krim and Robert Benjamin.

== Philadelphia fire commissioner ==
In 1952, mayor Joseph S. Clark Jr. appointed McNamee to the position of fire commissioner, which was created after the PFD became independent from the department of public safety. Under his leadership, the department underwent a modernization program that saw the closure or replacement of older fire stations, engine and ladder companies move from separate stations into the same building, the construction of a new fire training school, and the replacement of the city's firefighting apparatuses. He retired on April 24, 1964.

== Later life and death ==
McNamee spent his later years in Lakewood, Ohio. He died on November 6, 1974, at Fairview Park Hospital in Cleveland.

Business positions
Preceded by Gradwell Sears	President of United Artists; July 12, 1950–February 16, 1951	Succeeded by Arthur B. Krim
Fire appointments
Preceded by John C. Cost (as Chief Engineer)	Philadelphia Fire Commissioner; March 1, 1952–April 24, 1964	Succeeded by George E. Hink
Sporting positions
Preceded by James P. Clark	President of the Philadelphia Eagles; January 3, 1953–January 21, 1964	Succeeded by Jerry Wolman
