= Marshall Leahy =

American football executive

Personal information
- Born: October 10, 1910; San Francisco, California, U.S.
- Died: January 3, 1983 (aged 72); San Francisco, California, U.S.

Career information
- College: Santa Clara University; Hastings College of the Law

Career history
- San Francisco 49ers (1946–1959) Legal counsel; National Football League (1960–1982) Chief legal counsel

Marshall Edmund Leahy (October 10, 1910 – January 3, 1983) was an American attorney who was the chief legal counsel for the National Football League.

== Early life ==
Leahy was born on October 10, 1910, in San Francisco. He was an All-Pacific Coast guard for the Santa Clara Broncos men's basketball team and pitched for the school's baseball team. During his senior year he was the captain of the basketball team and president of the student congress. He earned a Bachelor of Philosophy from Santa Clara University in 1931 and Bachelor of Laws from the Hastings College of the Law in 1934.

== Legal career ==
Leahy was admitted to the bar in 1934. From 1943 to 1945, Leahy worked in the San Francisco District Attorney's Office as the assistant district attorney in charge of Grand Jury. In 1946 he formed a partnership with John F. O'Dea. That same year, Leahy helped found the Farmers' Rice Cooperative. He served for many years as the organization's vice president and legal counsel. He also served as general counsel of the San Francisco Warriors of the National Basketball Association.

== National Football League ==
Leahy became legal counsel for the San Francisco 49ers when the team was founded in 1946. When the 49ers joined the National Football League in 1950 he began representing the league as well. He represented the NFL before the Supreme Court of the United States in Radovich v. National Football League.

Following National Football League Commissioner Bert Bell's death in 1959, Leahy and acting commissioner Austin Gunsel were seen as the front-runners for the job. Before voting began, Leahy stated that he would not leave San Francisco if elected commissioner, which resulted in strong opposition from four owners (Carroll Rosenbloom, Art Rooney, George Preston Marshall, and Frank L. McNamee), who did not want the league office moved to the west coast. At the January 20, 1960 owners meeting, Leahy received 7 votes to Gunsel's 5, which was short of the two-thirds needed to be elected commissioner. After an eight-day deadlock, Leahy's supporters finally gave in and Los Angeles Rams general manager Pete Rozelle was elected as a compromise candidate. After the election, Rozelle appointed Leahy general counsel of the National Football League. He assisted Rozelle with the league's 1964 television contract and represented the NFL in Joe Kapp's antitrust suit against the league.
