= James P. Clark =

American businessman and political boss

James P. Clark (April 11, 1899 – April 17, 1962) was an American political boss, sportsman, and businessman. He was a leader of the Democratic Party in Philadelphia and owner of the Philadelphia Eagles of the National Football League.

== Early life ==
Clark was born in Pittsburgh, on April 11, 1899. He moved to Philadelphia at the age of five. As a youth, Clark worked for the American Bridge Company. In 1915, he joined the Electric Theatre Supplies Company. He then worked for the Kline Porter Company.

== Career ==
Clark eventually chose to start his own business, Clark Delivery Service, which specialized in the transportation of film reels and related products. In 1934, he merged his company with the Horlacher Delivery Service. He renamed the company Highway Express Lines and by 1950 had a fleet of over 400 trucks. By 1965, the company was one of the largest general cargo firms in the Mid-Atlantic. It operated more than 500 tractor trailers and had ten terminals and seven way stations in Pennsylvania, New Jersey, Maryland, and Virginia.

=== Politics ===
In 1941, Clark was elected chairman of the Philadelphia Democratic city committee. He succeeded a political ally, John B. Kelly, who had been appointed national physical fitness director. Clark helped shore up the financially strapped party with his own money. Soon after becoming chairman, Clark backed the "Big Truck" bill, a bipartisan piece of legislation favorable to the trucking industry also supported by Republican Joseph N. Pew Jr. that was ultimately defeated.

Democratic leaders wanted a candidate from Eastern Pennsylvania to be the party nominee in the 1944 United States Senate election. The heads of the county committees decided to allow Clark to select the party's preferred candidate. He selected U.S. representative Francis J. Myers, who went on to defeat Republican incumbent James J. Davis. In that same election, Philadelphia Democrats won all six of the city's seats in the United States House of Representatives and returned a strong delegation to the Pennsylvania General Assembly. The city also gave President Franklin Delano Roosevelt a 130,000 vote majority, which helped him carry the state of Pennsylvania. The success of Clark's candidates in the 1944 election led Robert Taylor of The Pittsburgh Press to put him on par with the two major Democratic leaders in the state; U.S. Senator Joseph F. Guffey and state party chairman David L. Lawrence.

Clark stepped down as party chairman in 1946 due to business pressures, but remained influential in Democratic party politics. In 1950, Clark offered to donate $25,000 to charity if Republican James H. Duff debated his opponent in that year's United States Senate election, Francis J. Myers. The debate never occurred and Duff defeated Myers. In 1952, Clark, a supporter of Estes Kefauver, led an unsuccessful attempt to remove city committee chairman James A. Finnegan, who backed Adlai Stevenson.

During the late 1950s and early 1960s, Clark was an ally of U.S. Representative and Philadelphia Democratic chairman William J. Green Jr. and served as finance chairman of the Philadelphia Democratic Committee. The two were credited with helping John F. Kennedy win the state in the 1960 presidential election.

In 1961, Clark fought against a bill in the Pennsylvania General Assembly that would ease restrictions on the size of trailers allowed on highways.

=== Sports ===
In 1949, Clark led a group of 100 Philadelphia businessmen who purchased the Philadelphia Eagles from Alexis Thompson for $250,000. Clark served as the team president from 1949 to 1953, but gave up the position due to business pressure. He was succeeded by Frank L. McNamee, but remained with the organization as vice president. In 1958, he was elected to the newly created position of chairman. The Eagles won the NFL Championships twice under the ownership of Clark's syndicate (1949 and 1960). In 1950, Clark's syndicate attempted to purchase the Philadelphia Athletics from Connie Mack, but was unsuccessful.

In 1961, the Pennsylvania harness racing commission voted 2–1 to grant Clark's Liberty Bell Racing Association the state's first parimutuel track license, with both Democratic members of the committee voting in favor of Clark and the Republican member voting against. Clark died before the track was completed, but his niece's husband, Michael J. O'Neill, saw the construction of the $12.5 million track through and Liberty Bell Park Racetrack opened on June 7, 1963.

== Death ==
In 1959, Clark suffered a heart attack at his apartment in Center City Philadelphia. On April 17, 1962, Clark died of a stroke at his home in Philadelphia. Clark left his estate, which included Highway Express Lines and his shares in the Philadelphia Eagles and the Liberty Bell Racing Association, to his wife, Margaret, and niece, Marie O'Neill, whom he raised from the age of nine. His will stipulated that if Highway Express Lines was sold, his employees would have the first opportunity to purchase it. The estate was valued at $4 million.

In 1963, Clark's syndicate, known as the "Happy Hundred", sold the Eagles to Jerry Wolman for $5,505,000. Two years later, Highway Express Lines was purchased by E. William Uttal.
