= Red Kellett =

American baseball player (1909–1970)

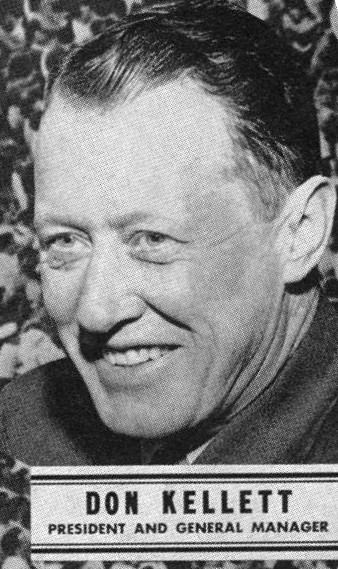
- Infielder
- Born: July 15, 1909; Brooklyn, New York, U.S.
- Died: November 3, 1970 (aged 61); Fort Lauderdale, Florida, U.S.
- Batted: Right Threw: Right

MLB debut
- July 2, 1934, for the Boston Red Sox

Last MLB appearance
- September 30, 1934, for the Boston Red Sox

MLB statistics
- Games played: 9
- At bats: 9
- Walks: 1
- Stats at Baseball Reference

Teams
- Boston Red Sox (1934)

Donald Stafford "Red" Kellett (July 15, 1909 – November 3, 1970) was the president and general manager of the Baltimore Colts franchise of the National Football League (NFL) from 1953 until 1966, during which time his teams won two NFL championships. Kellett is credited as the general manager who brought Pittsburgh Steelers cast-off Johnny Unitas from semi-professional sandlots to superstardom in the NFL.

A three sport star at the University of Pennsylvania from 1932 to 1934, Kellett also had a brief playing career in Major League Baseball as an infielder for the Boston Red Sox.

== Biography ==
=== Early life and college ===
Born in Brooklyn, New York, Kellett attended Erasmus Hall High School in Brooklyn and lettered in four sports. He then attended Peekskill Military Academy in Peekskill, New York, where he lettered in three sports.

Red Kellett (3) carrying the ball for Pennsylvania during his 1932 sophomore year.

Kellet enrolled at the University of Pennsylvania where he majored in economics. In his first year, he captained the freshman football, basketball, and baseball teams. He reached varsity level for all three of the sports the next year, and received a total of nine varsity letters while at Penn. He played quarterback on the football team, guard on the basketball team, and alternated between second baseman and shortstop on the baseball team.

As a senior, he was captain for the baseball team, and starting quarterback for the football team. He also was President of Kappa Sigma fraternity, was a member of Phi Beta Kappa society and served on the board of governors for Houston Hall.

=== Baseball career ===
Kellett batted .488 during his 1934 senior year at Penn and was regarded as one of the top collegiate hitters in the Northeast. This drew the attention of the Boston Red Sox, who signed him to a professional baseball contract which included a $5,000 bonus, a substantial sum for the era. He was quickly promoted to the majors, where he was a reserve infielder. Kellett appeared in nine games in 1934 season, going 0-for-9 with a walk in 10 plate appearances. In the field, he made 2 errors in 15 total chances for an .867 fielding percentage.

After his 1934 debut, Kellett would be sent to the minors, playing for Little Rock in the Southern Association and Albany in the International League. He also spent a brief amount of time with the Syracuse Chiefs before moving into coaching full-time.

=== Coaching career ===
In autumn 1935, he was named head coach for the freshmen football and basketball teams at Ursinus College in Collegeville, Pennsylvania. He became head coach of the varsity football team after his brief stint with the Chiefs ended.

In 1941, he left Ursinus to return to his alma mater. At Penn, he served as Director of Freshmen Athletics and head coach of the freshmen basketball and football teams. He later became head coach of the varsity basketball team, and won a conference title for the 1944–45 season.

=== Broadcast career ===
He left Penn after the 1947–48 season to become an administrative assistant to WFIL station manager Roger W. Clipp. He also worked as a play-by-play announcer at the station. The first game he announced was also the first commercial football telecast for the station. Kellett went on to head operations for WFIL's radio and (now defunct) television station. During the 1948–49 season, Kellett called New York Knicks games on WOR and WPIX.

=== Football executive ===
After being granted a new franchise in the National Football League for the 1953 season, the Baltimore Colts named Kellett their first team president and general manager. He and his wife, the former Dorothea L. Tevis, moved to Baltimore after being hired for the Colts job in 1952.

Kellett is credited for helping the team land Johnny Unitas, drafted by the Pittsburgh Steelers in the 1955 NFL draft before being unceremoniously cut from the team. Unitas became one of the superstars of his era and his championship-level play made the team a household name as the second winningest franchise of the 1960s.

In 1959, Kellett was a contender for NFL Commissioner. He was supported by four team owners who opposed the candidacy of Marshall Leahy due to his plan to move the league office to San Francisco. After eight days of deadlock, Los Angeles Rams general manager Pete Rozelle was selected as a compromise candidate.

=== Later life, death, and legacy ===
Kellett retired in January 1967 and relocated to Fort Lauderdale, Florida. He spent much of his free time playing golf, occasionally offering the Colts advice via telephone.

Although he had suffered one heart attack while still working for the Colts, his health was presumed excellent, commenting to reporters shortly before his death that he had his weight "back to where it was when I played football in college." However, he suddenly felt ill the evening of November 3, 1970, having just returned from a trip to Baltimore, and succumbed to a heart attack later that night.

Kellett was 61 years old at the time of his death. He was buried in Pikesville, Maryland.

== Head coaching record ==
=== Football ===
Year	Team	Overall	Conference	Standing	Bowl/playoffs
Ursinus Bears (Eastern Pennsylvania Collegiate Conference) (1938–1940)
1938	Ursinus	0–7–1	0–4	5th	
1939	Ursinus	2–5–1	0–3–1	5th	
1940	Ursinus	1–6–1	0–4	5th	
Ursinus:		3–18–3	0–11–1		
Total:		3–18–3			
