= Carrie Rozelle =

Canadian-American activist

- Born: Carrie Dike; October 31, 1937; Port Dalhousie, Ontario, Canada
- Died: October 29, 2007 (aged 69); Rancho Santa Fe, California, U.S.
- Occupation: Disability rights activist
- Spouse(s): Ralph Kent Cooke (1959–1972; divorce); Pete Rozelle (1973–1996; his death)

Carrie Rozelle (née Dike; October 31, 1937 – October 29, 2007) was a Canadian-born American disabilities activist, whose struggles with her own learning-disabled son, Jack, led her to establish the National Center for Learning Disabilities. Rozelle was married to former NFL commissioner Pete Rozelle, who died in 1996.

Born in Port Dalhousie, Ontario to Philip and Ziva Dyke, she was married to Ralph Kent Cooke, son of Jack Kent Cooke, a Canadian businessman and onetime owner of the Washington Redskins and Los Angeles Lakers, for thirteen years until their divorce in 1972. They had four children, three sons and a daughter. Jack, born with learning disabilities, died in 1990.

Jack Cooke's severe dyslexia and "sense of failure" created what Rozelle described as "a hurricane." These experiences led her to establish the Foundation for Children With Learning Disabilities in 1977, organizing a charity ball in Manhattan to raise funds.

In her twelve years as chairwoman, the organization provided grants for public awareness programs in schools, daycare centers, museums, and summer camps. It ran parent-education workshops, created book collections for children with matching tapes and film strips, and held training sessions for librarians.

The foundation, which became known as the National Center for Learning Disabilities in 1989, provides support to more than a million families a year and has an annual budget of four million dollars. It focuses on early screening programs (about three hundred fifty thousand children were tested in 2006); informing parents on how to deal with school systems, and promoting public policies connected with the rights of the learning disabled.

Rozelle died of cancer on October 29, 2007, at age 69, in Rancho Santa Fe, California.
