= Paul D. Staudohar =

American Labor Economist and Arbitrator

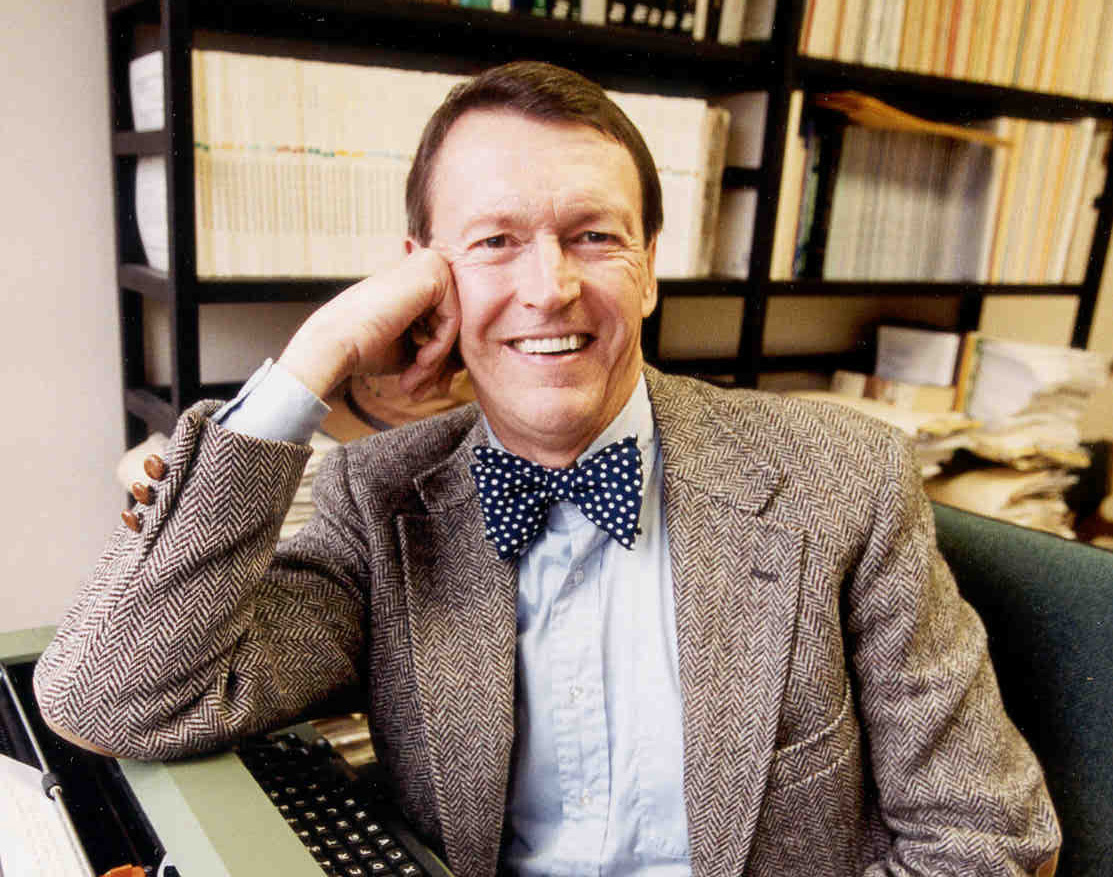
- Staudohar in 2002
- Born: December 3, 1940 (age 85); Duluth, Minnesota, U.S.

Academic background
- Education: University of Minnesota Duluth (BA); University of Southern California (MBA, MA, PhD)

Academic work
- Discipline: Labor economics
- Institutions: California State University, East Bay

Paul D. Staudohar (born December 3, 1940) is an American labor economist and arbitrator. He is a Professor Emeritus of Business Administration at California State University, East Bay, and is known for his research on collective bargaining in professional sports. Between 1988 and 2013, the Bureau of Labor Statistics published nine of his articles in the Monthly Labor Review on sports labor disputes. He co-founded the Journal of Sports Economics in 2000.

== Early life and education ==
Staudohar was born in Duluth, Minnesota, and attended the University of Minnesota, Duluth, where he earned a Bachelor of Arts degree in 1962. He played on the varsity hockey team.

He went on to the University of Southern California, completing a Master of Business Administration in 1966, a Master of Arts in 1968, and a Ph.D. in economics in 1969.

== Academic career ==
Staudohar joined the faculty at California State University, Hayward in 1969, after working as an administrative officer at United California Bank in Los Angeles (1964–1966) and as an economics instructor at USC (1967–1969). He taught in the College of Business and Economics for 38 years, becoming professor of business administration in 1978.

== Arbitration career ==
Staudohar began work as a labor arbitrator in 1974, taking cases in both private industry and public employment. He was approved to serve on several federal and state arbitration panels, including the Roster of Arbitrators of the Federal Mediation and Conciliation Service, the National Labor Panel of the American Arbitration Association, and the Panel of Neutrals of the California Public Employment Relations Board.

Over a career spanning four decades, Staudohar decided hundreds of grievance cases between unions and employers. His published decisions in Labor Arbitration Reports (Bureau of National Affairs) included cases involving Safeway, Shell Oil, Boeing, the University of California, Excalibur Hotel and Casino, AT&T, the City of Oakland, the US Border Patrol, and the County of Monterey.

Staudohar was a member of the National Academy of Arbitrators and served as editor of its annual meeting proceedings for 2008, 2009, and 2010.

By his retirement in 2018, he held permanent arbitrator appointments with Safeway/UFCW and the University of California.

== Sports Labor Economics ==
Roger Noll, Professor Emeritus of Economics at Stanford University, called Staudohar “the leading economist on collective bargaining in sports.”

=== Monthly Labor Review articles on sports labor disputes ===
From 1988 to 2013, Staudohar contributed nine articles to the Monthly Labor Review, the Bureau of Labor Statistics’ flagship publication, covering labor disputes across North American professional sports. The series opened with the 1987 NFL players’ strike, then the baseball lockout of 1990, and the 1994–95 baseball strike—at 232 days the longest work stoppage in professional sports history, and the one that canceled the World Series. The 1998–99 NBA lockout followed, as did a 2002 piece analyzing baseball’s first labor settlement in decades to conclude without a work stoppage. Later articles covered the 2004–05 NHL lockout, which wiped out an entire season, concurrent 2004–05 NFL lockout, 2011 NBA lockouts, and the 2012–13 NHL lockout.

=== Journal of Sports Economics ===
In 2000, Staudohar co-founded the Journal of Sports Economics with economists Leo H. Kahane and Stephen Shmanske. A 2003 content analysis described the JSE as "the first academic journal exclusively focused on the economics of sport." He co-authored the journal's inaugural article (Vol. 1, No. 1, 2000). Cornell labor economist Lawrence M. Kahn cited Playing for Dollars in a 2000 article in the Journal of Economic Perspectives.

=== International Association of Sports Economists ===
Staudohar served as the first president of the International Association of Sports Economists from 1999 to 2002, an organization founded in Limoges, France.

== Selected Publications ==
=== Books ===
- The Sports Industry and Collective Bargaining (2nd ed.). ILR Press, Cornell University, 1989.
- Labor Relations in Professional Sports (with Robert C. Berry and William B. Gould IV). Auburn House, 1986. Reviewed in the Journal of Sport History as "comprehensive," concluding the authors "have done a commendable job."
- Playing for Dollars: Labor Relations and the Sports Business. Cornell University Press, 1996. ALA Booklist called it "an enlightening and often enjoyable treatise on one of the least understood aspects of the modern sports scene." Republished by Cornell University Press, 2018.
