= Bert Bell =

American football player, coach, and executive (1895–1959)

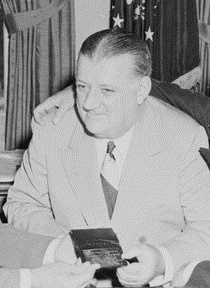
- Bell in 1949
- Born: De Benneville Bell; February 25, 1895; Philadelphia, Pennsylvania, U.S.
- Died: October 11, 1959 (aged 64); Philadelphia, Pennsylvania, U.S.
- Education: University of Pennsylvania (BA)
- Football career

Career information
- High school: Haverford (Haverford, Pennsylvania)
- College: Penn (1914–1919)

Career history

Coaching
- Penn (1920–1928) Assistant coach; Temple (1930–1932) Assistant coach; Philadelphia Eagles (1936–1940) Head coach; Pittsburgh Steelers (1941) Head coach

Operations
- Philadelphia Eagles (1933–1935) Owner; Philadelphia Eagles (1936–1940) Owner, president & general manager; Pittsburgh Steelers (1940–1946) Co-owner

Awards and highlights
- Philadelphia Eagles Hall of Fame

Head coaching record
- Career: 10–46–2 (.190)
- Military career
- Allegiance: United States
- Branch: United States Army
- Service years: 1917–1918
- Rank: First Sergeant
- Unit: Mobile Hospital Unit
- Conflicts: World War I; Western Front
- Coaching profile at Pro Football Reference
- Executive profile at Pro Football Reference
- Pro Football Hall of Fame

2nd Commissioner of the NFL
- In office January 11, 1946 – October 11, 1959
- Preceded by: Elmer Layden
- Succeeded by: Austin Gunsel (interim)

De Benneville "Bert" Bell (February 25, 1895 – October 11, 1959) was an American professional football executive and coach. He was the fifth chief executive and second commissioner of the National Football League (NFL) from 1946 until his death in 1959. As commissioner, he introduced competitive parity into the NFL to improve the league's commercial viability and promote its popularity.

Whereas Bell had become the chief executive in a sport that was largely seen as second-rate and heading a league still plagued by franchise instability, by his death the NFL was a financially sound sports enterprise and seriously challenging Major League Baseball for preeminence among sports attractions in the United States. Bell was posthumously inducted into the charter class of the Pro Football Hall of Fame.

Bell played football at the University of Pennsylvania, where as quarterback, he led his team to an appearance in the 1917 Rose Bowl. After being drafted into the US Army during World War I, he returned to complete his collegiate career at Penn and went on to become an assistant football coach with the Quakers in the 1920s. During the Great Depression, he was an assistant coach for the Temple Owls and a co-founder and co-owner of the Philadelphia Eagles.

With the Eagles, Bell led the way in cooperating with the other NFL owners to establish the NFL draft in order to afford the weakest teams the first opportunity to sign the best available players. He subsequently became sole proprietor of the Eagles, but the franchise suffered financially. Eventually, he sold the team and bought a share in the Pittsburgh Steelers. During World War II, Bell argued against the league suspending operations until the war's conclusion.

After the war, he was elected NFL commissioner and sold his ownership in the Steelers. As commissioner, he implemented a proactive anti-gambling policy, negotiated a merger with the All-America Football Conference (AAFC), and unilaterally crafted the entire league schedule with an emphasis on enhancing the dramatic effect of late-season matches. During the Golden Age of Television, he tailored the game's rules to strengthen its appeal to mass media and enforced a policy of blacking out local broadcasts of home contests to safeguard ticket receipts. Amid criticism from franchise owners and under pressure from Congress, he unilaterally recognized the NFLPA and facilitated in the development of the first pension plan for the players. He survived to oversee the "Greatest Game Ever Played" and to envision what the league would become in the future.

As commissioner, Bell oversaw the integration of the NFL. Although Fritz Pollard was the first African American to play in the NFL, appearing with three teams from 1922 to 1926, a “gentleman’s agreement” among the owners kept the sport segregated for another 20 years. In 1946, four black players began playing in the NFL.

== Early life (1895–1932) ==
Bell was born De Benneville Bell, on February 25, 1895, in Philadelphia to John C. Bell and Fleurette de Benneville Myers. His father was an attorney who served a term as the Pennsylvania Attorney General. His older brother, John C. Jr., was born in 1892. Bert's parents were very wealthy, and his mother's lineage predated the American Revolutionary War. His father, a Quaker of the University of Pennsylvania (class of 1884) during the early days of American football, accompanied him to his first football game when Bell was six years old. Thereafter, Bell regularly engaged in football games with childhood friends.

In 1904, Bell matriculated at the Episcopal Academy, the Delancey School from 1909 to 1911 and then the Haverford School until 1914. About this time, his father was installed as athletics director at Penn and helped form the National Collegiate Athletic Association (NCAA). At Haverford, Bell captained the school's football, basketball, and baseball teams, and "was awarded The Yale Cup [for being] 'The pupil who has done the most to promote athletics in the school.'" Although he excelled at baseball, his devotion was to football. His father, who was named a trustee at Penn in 1911, said of Bell's plans for college, "Bert will go to Penn or he will go to hell."

=== University of Pennsylvania (1914–1919) ===
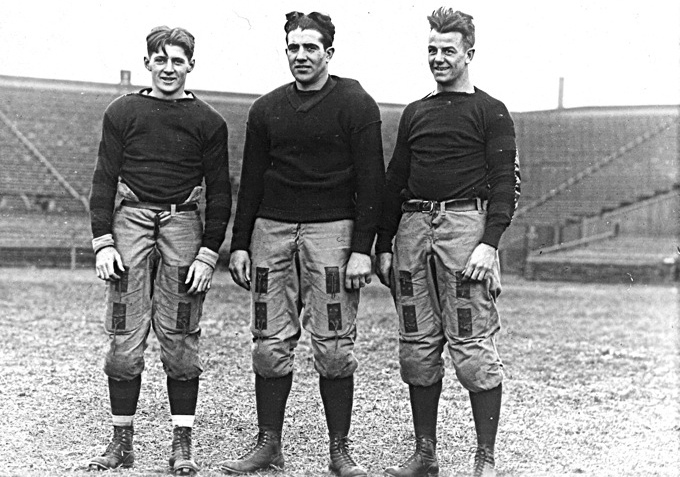
Bell (left) with Penn teammates Ben Derr (center) and Joe Berry in 1916

Bell entered the University of Pennsylvania in Philadelphia in the fall of 1914. He majored in English and joined the Phi Kappa Sigma fraternity. In a rare accomplishment for a sophomore, he was named the starting quarterback by Penn coach George H. Brooke. He also was a defender, punter, and punt returner. After the team's 3–0 start, Bell temporarily shared possession of his quarterbacking duties until he subsequently reclaimed them later in the season, as Penn finished with a record of 3–5–2.

Prior to Penn's 1916 season, Bell's mother died while he was en route to her bedside. He started the first game for the Quakers under new coach Bob Folwell, but mixed results left him platooned for the rest of the season. Penn finished with a record of 7–2–1. However, the Quakers secured an invitation to the 1917 Rose Bowl against the Oregon Ducks. Bell had the best offensive gain for Penn during their 0–14 loss to Oregon, a 20-yard run, but was replaced late in the game at quarterback after throwing an interception. In the 1917 season, Bell led Penn to a 9–2 record.

Following the 1917 season, Bell registered with a Mobile Hospital Unit of the United States Army for World War I and was deployed to France in May 1918. As a result of his unit participating in hazardous duty, it received a congratulatory letter for bravery from General John J. Pershing, and Bell was promoted to first sergeant. After the war, Bell returned to the United States in March 1919. He returned to Penn as captain of the team in the fall and again performed erratically. The Quakers finished 1919 with a 6–2–1 record. Academically, his aversion to attending classes forced him to withdraw from Penn without a degree in early 1920. His collegiate days ended with his having been a borderline All-American, but this period of his life had proven that he "possessed the qualities of a leader."

=== Early career (1920–1932) ===
Bell assembled the Stanley Professionals in Chicago in 1920, but he disbanded it prior to playing any games because of negative publicity received by Chicago due to the Black Sox Scandal. He joined John Heisman's staff at Penn as an assistant coach in 1920, where he remained for several years. At Penn, he was well regarded as a football coach, and after its 1924 season, he drew offers for, but declined, head-coaching assignments at other universities. At least as early as 1926, his avocation was socializing and frequenting Saratoga Race Course, where he counted as friends Tim Mara, Art Rooney, and George Preston Marshall. In 1928, Bell tendered his resignation at Penn in protest over the emphasis on in-season scrimmages during practices by Lud Wray, a fellow assistant coach. Bell's resignation was accommodated prior to the start of the 1929 season.

Bell was then an employee of the Ritz-Carlton in Philadelphia. At one point, he tried his hand as a stock broker and lost $50,000 (equivalent to $940,000 in 2025) during the Wall Street Crash of 1929. His father bailed him out of his deprivation, and he returned to working at the Ritz. From 1930 until 1932, he was a backfield coach for Temple in Philadelphia. In 1932, Marshall tried to coax Bell into buying the rights to an NFL franchise, but Bell disparaged the league and ridiculed the idea. When Pop Warner was hired to coach Temple for the 1933 season, Warner chose to hire his own assistants, and Bell was let go by Temple.

== NFL career ==
=== Philadelphia Eagles (1933–1940) ===
By early 1933, Bell's opinion on the NFL had changed, and he wanted to become an owner of a team based in Philadelphia. After being advised by the NFL that a prerequisite to a franchise being rendered in Philadelphia was that the Pennsylvania Blue Laws would have to be mollified, he was the force majeure in lobbying to getting the laws deprecated. He borrowed funds from his girlfriend, Broadway actress Frances Upton, partnered with Wray, and he procured the rights to a franchise in Philadelphia, purchasing the Frankford Yellow Jackets which he christened as the Philadelphia Eagles, inspired by Franklin Delano Roosevelt's use of the American eagle symbol in choosing that name.

After the inaugural 1933 Philadelphia Eagles season, Bell married Upton at St. Madeleine Sophie Roman Catholic Church in Philadelphia. Known for his wild social life in his younger years, Bell was told directly by Upton that "it's either alcohol or me" while at a lounge; he finished his drink, turned the glass over, and was teetotal for the remainder of his life. Days later, his suggestion to bestow the winner of the NFL championship game with the Ed Thorp Memorial Trophy was affirmed. In 1934, the Eagles finished with a 4–7 record, The Eagles' inability to seriously challenge other teams made it difficult to sell tickets, and his failure to sign a talented college prospect led him to adduce that the only way to bring stability to the league was to institute a draft to ensure the weakest teams had an advantage in signing the preeminent players. In 1935, his proposal for a draft was accepted, and in February 1936, the first draft kicked off, at which he acted as Master of Ceremonies. Later that month, his first child, Bert Jr., was born.

In the Eagles' first three years, the partners exhausted $85,000 (equivalent to $1,970,000 in 2025), and at a public auction, Bell became sole owner of the Eagles with a bid of $4,500 (equivalent to $104,000 in 2025). Austerity measures forced him to supplant Wray as head coach of the Eagles, wherein Bell led the Eagles to a 1–11 finish, their worst record ever. In December, an application for a franchise in Los Angeles was obstructed by Bell and Pittsburgh Steelers owner Rooney as they deemed it too far of a distance to travel for games. During the Eagles' 2–8–1 1937 season, his second child, John "Upton", was born. In the Eagles' first profitable season, 1938, they posted a 5–6 record. The Eagles finished 1–9–1 in 1939 and 1–10 in 1940.

=== Pittsburgh Steelers (1940–1945) ===
In December 1940, Bell conciliated the sale of Rooney's Steelers to Alexis Thompson, and then Rooney acquired half of Bell's interest in the Eagles. In a series of events known as the Pennsylvania Polka, Rooney and Bell exchanged their entire Eagles roster and their territorial rights in Philadelphia to Thompson for his entire Steelers roster and his rights in Pittsburgh. Ostensibly, Rooney had provided assistance to Bell by rewarding him with a 20% commission on the sale of the Steelers. Bell became the Steelers head coach and Rooney became the general manager.

During the training camp of Pittsburgh's inaugural season with the nickname Steelers, Bell was buoyant with optimism about the team's prospect, but he became crestfallen after Rooney denigrated the squad and flippantly remarked that they looked like the "[s]ame old Steelers" (SOS). After losing the first two games of the 1941 season, Rooney compelled Bell to resign as head coach. Bell's coaching career ended with a 10–46–2 record, his 0.179 winning percentage is second-lowest in NFL history to only Phil Handler's 0.105 for coaches with at least five seasons. And at 36 games under .500 he held the record for futility until John McKay passed him in 1983 and Marion Campbell passed him in 1988. His first daughter and last child, Jane Upton, was born several months after the season's conclusion.

By 1943, 40% of the NFL rosters had been drafted into the United States Armed Forces for World War II. The resulting difficulty in fielding a full-strength squad led some owners to recommend the league should shut down until the war ended. Bell auspiciously argued against this as he feared they might not be able to resume operations easily after the war, and since Major League Baseball was continuing unabated, then they should also.

Throughout Bell's affiliation with the Steelers, he suffered monetarily and Rooney bought an increasing allotment of the franchise from him. Compounding Bell's problems, Arch Ward organized the All-America Football Conference (AAFC) in 1944 to displace the NFL's sovereignty in professional football. Ward's AAFC promptly began luring players to join the league, which resulted in salaries being driven up drastically. In Bill Dudley's contract proceedings with the Steelers, he attributed Bell's anxiety during the negotiations to the rivalry from the AAFC. Furthermore, by the end of 1945, the Steelers were in their most economically perilous situation in its history.

=== NFL commissioner (1946–1959) ===
==== Election, Hapes-Filchock, and the NFL schedule (1946–1948) ====
Elmer Layden was appointed the first NFL commissioner in 1941, but Ward appeared as dictating his hiring. Layden tendered his resignation for personal reasons January 1946. Bell, who was not well respected in Pittsburgh, was elected to replace him. He received a three-year contract at $20,000 per year (equivalent to $330,000 in 2025), and transacted a sale of his stake in the Steelers to Rooney, albeit for a price Bell did not construe was full-value. He was then immediately placed at the center of a controversy wherein the owners denied Dan Reeves permission to relocate the Cleveland Rams to Los Angeles. Bell moderated a settlement, and, as a result, the Los Angeles Rams were formed. As a precondition to the Rams leasing the Los Angeles Coliseum, they signed Kenny Washington, which marked the beginning of the end of racial segregation on the field, but also caused "all hell to break loose" amidst the owners.

The drawing up of a regular-season schedule had been a perennial source of contention among the NFL owners since the league's inception. The crux of the problem was the scheduling of games meant weighing the interest of owners who, early in the season, wanted their franchises to confront teams that drew the largest crowds, versus owners who wanted to play the weaker franchises to pad their team's win–loss record. The resultant impasse coerced the owners, in 1946, to confer upon Bell the sole discretion in developing the league's schedule. He utilized this responsibility to, early in the season, pit the weaker teams against other weak teams, and the strong teams against other strong teams. His goal was to augment game attendances by keeping the difference in team standings to a minimum as deep into the season as possible.

On the eve of the 1946 championship game, Bell was notified that Merle Hapes and Frank Filchock of the New York Giants had been implicated in a bribing scandal. Filchock was sanctioned by Bell to play in the game but Hapes was suspended. At the next NFL owners' meeting, Bell was worried the repercussions from this event would lead to his firing. However, he was pleasantly surprised to learn that his contract would be elevated to five years at $30,000 per year. Reinvigorated with renewed support, he persuaded the owners to allow him to put sudden-death overtime into the playoffs.

Subsequently, he wrote an anti-gambling resolution into the league constitution, which empowered him with the ability to permanently ban any NFL associated personnel for betting on a game or for withholding information on a game being possibly fixed. Furthermore, to obstruct gamblers from getting inside information, he secreted the names of officials he would assign to games, and he directed each team to promulgate a precursory injury report which listed anyone who might not participate in a game. Eventually, he lobbied to get every state in the US to criminalize the fixing of sporting events and put employees on the payroll of the NFL to investigate potential betting scams.

==== AAFC–NFL merger (1948–1950) ====
The NFL's struggle against the AAFC generated stress on wages, attendance, marketing, and by 1949, it had prevented the NFL for showing a profit for three consecutive years. Bell and representatives from both leagues met to attempt a merger, but their efforts were fruitless. In an unrelated matter, he apprised the owners that attendance records had shown televising games locally had a negative impact on the sale of home tickets. Nevertheless, he actualized the NFL's first television contract—the 1949 championship game. Simultaneously, he dealt with a lawsuit from Bill Radovich, who had been blacklisted for leaving the Lions and gaining employment with the AAFC. Bell and the owners were advised by John C. Jr. that this lawsuit was potentially not winnable, and the ramifications from the outcome of the case weighed heavily on Bell.

One of the primary impediments in an AAFC–NFL merger was the supposed violation of "territorial rights" claimed by Marshall. Eventually, Bell gathered enough support to effectuate a compromise with the AAFC. In late 1949, the leagues merged, as three AAFC teams (the Cleveland Browns, San Francisco 49ers, and Baltimore Colts) joined the NFL; a fourth AAFC team (Los Angeles Dons) merged with the Los Angeles Rams, and the other AAFC teams disbanded. Bell stayed on as commissioner with his contract extended from five to ten years Seeking to capitalize on the publicity of the residual AAFC–NFL rivalry, he utilized "exquisite dramatic" and business sense and allocated the 1950 opening game to a contest between the 1949 champion Eagles versus the perennial AAFC champion Browns. Feeling financially secure after the merger, he purchased his first home for himself and his family in Narberth, Pennsylvania.

==== Marketing of the NFL (1950–1956) ====
In 1950, Bell originated a blackout rule into the NFL which forbid all teams to televise their home games within a 75-mile radius of their stadium – except for the Rams. Consequently, the United States Department of Justice (DOJ) opened an investigation into a violation of the Sherman Antitrust Act. Rams attendance for 1950 dropped off by 50%, and this signaled a potential financial disaster. In 1951, he licensed the DuMont Television Network to air the championship games for the next five years, and he stipulated that teams were free to develop their own television contracts independently.

However, preceding the 1951 season, he reimposed the blackout rule on all teams in the league. The DOJ filed suit over this and Bell publicly retorted, "You can't give fans a game for free on TV and also expect them to go to the ballpark"; nevertheless, the suit was ordered to trial for January 1952. After the 1951 season ended, he gained unilateral control over the setting of a television strategy for the NFL. He negotiated a deal with DuMont, which granted it the rights to nationally broadcast one regular-season game every week, and he directed that the income from this contract was to be shared equally between all the teams. In the DOJ's case, the judge ruled that the blackout policy was legal, but both Bell, and the franchises collectively, were enjoined from negotiating a TV contract; Bell was ecstatic. Later that year, Bell forced one of the owners of the Cleveland Browns to sell all of his shares in the team after Bell determined the owner had bet on Browns' football games. Although he hated to fly, at some indeterminate point, he visited the training camps of every team and lectured on the danger gamblers posed to the league.

Bell authorized a Pro Bowl to be held at the end of each season in order to showcase the talents of the best players. But in the early 1950s, on the field activities sometimes denigrated to borderline assault and battery with teams' star players being viciously targeted by opposing players. He answered charges the league was too savage by saying, "I have never seen a maliciously dirty football player in my life and I don't believe there are any." Nevertheless, he ordered broadcasts to follow a strict rule of conduct whereby TV announcers would not be permitted to criticize the game, and neither fights, nor injuries, could be televised by virtue in his belief that announcers were "salesman for professional football [and] we do not want kids believing that engaging in fights is the way to play football."

Bell was criticized for censoring TV broadcasts, a charge he dismissed as not pertinent because he believed he was not impeding the print media but only advertising a product. After CBS and NBC gained the rights to broadcast the games in 1956, he advised the franchises to avoid criticizing the games or the officials, and forewarned that TV would give "'us our greatest opportunity to sell the NFL and everyone must present to the public the greatest games ... combined with the finest sportsmanship.'" This relationship with television was the beginning of the NFL's rise to becoming America's most popular sport.

==== Compromise with the NFLPA (1956–1957) ====
In Radovich v. National Football League, the Supreme Court ruled in Radovich's favor and declared the NFL was subject to antitrust laws, and the implication was that the legality of the draft and reserve clause were dubious. Bell pressed a case in the media that the NFL should be exempted from antitrust regulations and proffered the league was a sport and not a business. He invited an investigation from Congress with respect to the court's ruling. The House Judiciary committee, chaired by Emanuel Celler—who believed the draft was illegal and should be abolished, convened in July 1957 to discuss the ramifications of the Radovich decision. Red Grange and Bell testified at the committee's solicitation and argued the draft was essential to the sport's success. Representatives of the NFLPA contradicted these statements and said the draft and the reserve clause were anti-labor, and it seemed as if Congress was going to accept their position. Faced with Congressional opposition, Bell formally recognized the NFLPA and declared he would negotiate with its representatives.

However, Bell was speaking only for himself and without the auspices of the owners. At the next owners' meeting, Rooney admonished they either had to recognize the NFLPA or remove Bell as commissioner. In order to do this, they had to agree in a vote that required a super-majority. Bell unsuccessfully attempted to persuade the owners to permit the NFLPA to act as a bargaining agent for the players. However, he did reach a compromise with the owners to get them to acquiesce to some of the NFLPA's requests for salary standards and health benefits.

==== Final days (1958–1959) ====
For the 1958 season, the duration of timeouts was extended from 60 to 90 seconds and Bell mandated officials call a few TV timeouts during each game — a change which triggered criticism from sportswriters. The 1958 championship game became the first NFL championship game decided in overtime, and it was considered to be the greatest football game ever played. The game further increased football's marketability to television advertising, and the drama associated with overtime was the catalyst. Years later, after witnessing Bell openly crying after the game, Raymond Berry attributed it to Bell's realization of the impact the game would have on the prevalence of the sport.

The death of Mara in February 1959 unsettled Bell and he experienced a heart attack later that month. He converted to Catholicism that summer because of the lifelong urging of his wife, Mara's death, and his enduring friendship with Rooney, a practicing Catholic. Bell was advised by his doctor to avoid going to football games, to which he quipped, "I'd rather die watching football than in my bed with my boots off." Bell and his children attended an Eagles game on October 11 at Franklin Field against the Steelers (both his old teams). The Eagles held complimentary box seats for him and guests to watch the game, but he preferred to buy his own tickets and sit with the other fans. Sitting towards the end of the field near the end zone during the fourth quarter of the game, he suffered a fatal heart attack and died later that day at the nearby university hospital. League Treasurer Austin Gunsel was named interim NFL commissioner for the rest of the season.

Afterwards, he was remembered as "a man of buoyant joviality, with a rough and ready wit, laughter and genuine humility and honesty, clearly innocent of pretense and [pretension]." His funeral was held at Narberth's St. Margaret Roman Catholic Church and Monsignor Cornelius P. Brennan delivered the eulogy, as close friends and admirers attended the mass. Dominic Olejniczak and all the extant owners of the NFL franchises were pallbearers. Bell was interred at Calvary Cemetery in West Conshohocken, Pennsylvania, northwest of Philadelphia.

Bell had named Baltimore Colts owner Carroll Rosenbloom as his executor. Bell had been Rosenbloom's backfield coach at Penn in the early 1950s, and later had convinced Rosenbloom to purchase the Colts after becoming commissioner. Rosenbloom owned the Colts in 1958 when they won the greatest game ever played, and brought greater national attention to the NFL. After Bell's death, Rosenbloom hired Bell's sons Upton and Bert Jr. to work for the Colts.

== Legacy and honors ==
Designations

Pennsylvania Historical Marker
- Official name: Bert Bell
- Type: City
- Designated: November 22, 1997
- Location: 224-226 Haverford Ave., Narberth
- Marker text: National Football League Commissioner, 1946-1959. Popularized professional football; elevated its ethical standards. Eagles owner; Steelers part-owner. Resided in Narberth. Frequented Davis's store here to discuss sport with local people, coaches, athletes.

Bell was inducted into the Professional Football Hall of Fame, the Penn Athletics Hall of Fame, the Philadelphia Sports Hall of Fame, and Haverford's Athletic Hall of Fame. The Maxwell Football Club, which he founded in 1937, has presented the best NFL player of the year with the Bert Bell Award since 1959. The Bert Bell Benefit Bowl was exhibited in his honor from 1960 through 1969. A statue of Bell will be unveiled on October 25, 2024, at the University of Pennsylvania's Franklin Field. The historical maker to Bell in Narberth, Pennsylvania is within blocks of his family's home at 323 Haverford Avenue.

Although he did not have the wherewithal to prevent the wholesale betting on games, he was proactive in ensuring games were not tampered with by gamblers, and he created the foundation of the contemporary NFL anti-gambling policy.

Bell was criticized as being too strict with his refusal to let sold-out games to be televised locally. Nevertheless, his balancing of television broadcasts against protecting game attendance made the NFL the "healthiest professional sport in America", and he was the "leading protagonist in pro football's evolution into America's major sport." He had understood that the league needed a cooperative television contract with revenue-sharing, but he failed to overcome the obstacles to achieve it. He was portrayed by sportswriters as ensuring the owners treated the players fairly, and his decision to recognize the NFLPA in the face of adversity from owners was a "master stroke" in thwarting Congressional intervention. After he initiated terms for a pension plan with the players in 1959, little progress was made with the NFLPA, but three years after his death, the first players' pension plan was approved in 1962, which currently carries the names of Bell and then-commissioner Pete Rozelle ("Bert Bell / Pete Rozell Retirement Plan"), which was initially funded by the Playoff Bowl in 1960.

Bell's implementation of the draft did not show immediate results, but it was "the single greatest contributor to the [league]'s prosperity" in its first eighty-four years. His original version of the draft was later ruled unconstitutional, but his anchoring of the success of the league to competitive balance has been "hailed by contemporaries and sports historians".

Bell's belief in the efficacy of parity for the financial health of the league is best summarized by his most famous quotation, made to the press in November 1952 to explain an uptick in stadium attendance:

"The teams are so closely matched that on any given Sunday, any one team can beat any other team. Professional football has come down to the point where the psychological edge is the determining factor. Physically these teams are even, so it depends on the mental outlook of the squads to determine the winner. It's this factor that has made the game close and is bringing fans out to the ball parks."

== Head coaching record ==
=== NFL ===
Team	Year	Regular season					Postseason			
Team	Year	Won	Lost	Ties	Win %	Finish	Won	Lost	Win %	Result
PHI	1936	1	11	0	.083	5th in NFL Eastern	–	–	–	–
PHI	1937	2	8	1	.227	5th in NFL Eastern	–	–	–	–
PHI	1938	5	6	0	.455	4th in NFL Eastern	–	–	–	–
PHI	1939	1	9	1	.136	5th in NFL Eastern	–	–	–	–
PHI	1940	1	10	0	.091	5th in NFL Eastern	–	–	–	–
PHI total		10	44	2	.196		–	–	–	–
PIT	1941	0	2	0	.000	5th in NFL Eastern	–	–	–	–
PIT total		0	2	–	.000		–	–	–	–
Total		10	46	2	.190		–	–	–	–

== Published works ==
- Bell, Bert, "The Money Game." Liberty Magazine, XIII (November 28, 1936), pp. 59–60.
- Bell, Bert, "Offensive Football." Popular Football, (Winter 1941), p. 111.
- Bell, Bert, "This is Commissioner Bell Speaking." Pro Football Illustrated, XII (1952), pp. 60–63.
- Bell, Bert; with Martin, Paul, "Do the Gamblers Make a Sucker Out of You?." Saturday Evening Post, CCXXI (November 6, 1948), p. 28.
- Bell, Bert; with Pollock, Ed, "Let's Throw Out the Extra Point." Sport, XV (October 1953), p. 24–25.
- Bell, Bert (1957). The Story of Professional Football in Summary. Bala Cynwyd, PA: National Football League.

== Bibliography ==
=== Primary materials ===
- Lyons, Robert S. (2010). On Any Given Sunday, A Life of Bert Bell. Philadelphia: Temple University Press. ISBN 978-1-59213-731-2

=== Secondary materials ===
- When Pride Still Mattered, A Life of Vince Lombardi, by David Maraniss, 1999, ISBN 978-0-618-90499-0
- Organized Professional Team Sports: Part 1. United States House Committee on the Judiciary I, Subcommittee on Antitrust (1957).
- Organized Professional Team Sports: Part 3. United States House Committee on the Judiciary III, Subcommittee on Antitrust (1957).
- District Judge Allan Kuhn Grim (November 12, 1953). "United States v. National Football League, 116 F. Supp. 319 – Dist. Court, ED Pennsylvania 1953".
- Algeo, Matthew (2006). Last Team Standing. Philadelphia: Da Capo Press. ISBN 978-0-306-81472-3
- Berry, Robert C.; with Gould, William B. and Staudohar, Paul D. (1986). Labor Relations in Professional Sports. Dover, MA: Auburn House Pub. Co. ISBN 0-86569-137-1
- Brown, Paul; with Clary, Jack (1979). PB, the Paul Brown Story. New York: Atheneum.
- Carroll, Bob; with Gershman, Michael, Neft, David, and Thorn, John (1999). Total Football:The Official Encyclopedia of the National Football League. New York: HarperCollins. ISBN 0-06-270174-6
- Carroll, John M. (1999). Red Grange and the Rise of Modern Football. Urbana, IL: University of Illinois Press. ISBN 0-252-02384-6
- Claassen, Harold (Spike) (1963). The History of Professional Football. Englewood Cliffs, NJ: Prentice-Hall, Inc.
- Coenen, Craig R. (2005). From Sandlots to the Super Bowl: The National Football League, 1920–1967. Knoxville, TN: The University of Tennessee Press. ISBN 1-57233-447-9
- Daley, Arthur (1963). Pro Football's Hall of Fame. New York: Grosset and Dunlap.
- Danzig, Allison (1956). The History of American Football: Its Great Teams, Players, and Coaches. Englewood Cliffs, NJ: Prentice-Hall, Inc.
- Davis, Jeff (2005). Papa Bear, The Life and Legacy of George Halas. New York: McGraw-Hill ISBN 0-07-146054-3
- DeVito, Carlo (2006). Wellington: the Maras, the Giants, and the City of New York. Chicago: Triumph Books. ISBN 978-1-57243-872-9
- Didinger, Ray; with Lyons, Robert S. (2005). The Eagles Encyclopedia. Philadelphia: Temple University Press. ISBN 1-59213-449-1
- Gifford, Frank; with Richmond, Peter (2008). The Glory Game: How the 1958 NFL Championship Changed Football Forever. New York: HarperCollins. ISBN 978-0-06-171659-1
- Herskowitz, Mickey (1990). The Golden Age of Pro Football. Dallas: Taylor Publishing Company. ISBN 0-87833-751-2
- Hession, Joseph (1987). The Rams: Five Decades of Football. San Francisco: Foghorn Press. ISBN 0-935701-40-0
- Hibner, John Charles (1993). The Rose Bowl, 1902–1929. Jefferson, NC: McFarland & Company, Inc. Publishers. ISBN 0-89950-775-1
- King, Joe (1958). Inside Pro Football. Englewood Cliffs, NJ: Prentice-Hall, Inc.
- Layden, Elmer; with Snyder, Ed (1969). It Was a Different Game: The Elmer Layden Story. Englewood Cliffs, NJ:Prentice-Hall, Inc.
- LaBlanc, Michael L.; with Ruby, Mary K. (1994). Professional Sports Team Histories: Football. Detroit: Gale Research Inc. ISBN 0-8103-8861-8
- Levy, Alan H. (2003). Tackling Jim Crow, Racial Segregation in Professional Football. Jefferson, NC: McFarland and Co., Inc. ISBN 0-7864-1597-5
- Littlewood, Thomas B. (1990). Arch: A Promoter, not a Poet: The Story of Arch Ward. Ames, IA: Iowa State University Press. ISBN 0-8138-0277-6
- Lomax, Michael E. (April 2001). "Conflict and Compromise: The Evolution of American Professional Football's Labour Relations 1957–1966" (PDF). Football Studies. 4 (1): 5–39. Archived from the original (PDF) on June 9, 2012.
- MacCambridge, Michael (2005). America's Game. New York: Anchor Books. ISBN 978-0-307-48143-6
- MacCambridge, Michael (2009). ESPN College Football Encyclopedia: The Complete History of the Game. New York: ESPN Books, Inc. ISBN 1-4013-3703-1
- Marquis, Albert Nelson (1934). Who's Who in America: A Biographical Dictionary of Notable Living Men and Women of the United States, Vol., 18, 1934–1935, Two Years. Chicago: The A. N. Marquis Company.
- Maule, Tex (1964). The Game; The Official Picture History of the National Football League. New York: Random House
- Oriard, Michael (2007). Brand NFL: Making and Selling America's Favorite Sport. Chapel Hill: The University of North Carolina Press. ISBN 978-0-8078-3142-7
- Patton, Phil (1984). Razzle-Dazzle: The Curious Marriage of Television and Professional Football. Garden City, NY: The Dial Press. ISBN 0-385-27879-9
- Paul, William Henry (1974). The Gray-Flannel Pigskin: Movers and Shakers of Pro Football. Philadelphia: Lippincott.
- Pervin, Lawrence A. (2009). Football's New York Giants. Jefferson, NC: McFarland and Company, Inc. ISBN 978-0-7864-4268-3
- Peterson, Robert W. (1997). Pigskin: The Early Years of Pro Football. New York: Oxford University Press. ISBN 0-19-507607-9
- Piascik, Andy (2007). The Best Show in Football: The 1946–1955 Cleveland Browns. Lanham, MD: Taylor Trade Publishing. ISBN 978-1-58979-360-6
- Powers, Ron (1984). Supertube: The Rise of Television Sports. New York: Coward-McCann. ISBN 0-698-11253-9
- Rader, Benjamin G. (1984). In its Own Image: How Television Has Transformed Sports. New York: The Free Press. ISBN 0-02-925700-X
- Rathet, Mike; with Smith, Don R. (1984). Their Deeds and Dogged Faith. New York: Balsam Press. ISBN 0-917439-02-3
- Ratterman, George; with Deindorfer, Robert G. (1962). Confessions of a Gypsy Quarterback; Inside the Wacky World of Pro Football. New York: Coward-McCann, Inc.
- Riger, Robert; with Maule, Tex (1960). The Pros. New York: Simon and Schuster.
- Rooney, Dan; with Halaas, David F. and Masich, Andrew E. (2007). My 75 Years with the Pittsburgh Steelers and the NFL. Cambridge, MA: Da Capo Press. ISBN 978-0-7867-2603-5
- Rothe, Anna; with Prodrick, Elizabeth (1951). "Bert Bell" in Current Biography: Who's News and Why 1950. New York: The H.W. Wilson Company.
- Ruck, Rob; with Patterson, Maggie Jones and Weber, Michael P. (2010). Rooney: A Sporting Life. Lincoln, Neb.: University of Nebraska Press. ISBN 978-0-8032-2283-0
- Smith, Myron J. Jr. (1993). Professional Football: The Official Pro Football Hall of Fame Bibliography. Westport, CT: Greenwood Press. ISBN 0-313-28928-X
- Staudohar, Paul D. (1986). The Sports Industry and Collective Bargaining. Ithaca, NY: ILR Press. ISBN 0-87546-117-4
- Sullivan, George (1968). Pro Football's All Time Greats. New York: G. P. Putnam's Sons.
- Summerall, Pat; with Levin, Michael (2010). Giants: What I Learned about Life from Vince Lombardi and Tom Landry. Hoboken, NJ: John Wiley & Sons, Inc. ISBN 978-0-470-90908-9
- Umphlett, Wiley Lee (1992). Creating the Big Game: John W. Heisman and the Invention of American Football. Westport, CT: Greenwood Press. ISBN 0-313-28404-0
- Westcott, Rich (2001). A Century of Philadelphia Sports. Philadelphia: Temple University Press. ISBN 1-56639-861-4
- Whittingham, Richard (2002). What a Game They Played: An Inside Look at the Golden Era of Pro Football. Lincoln, Neb.: University of Nebraska Press, Inc. ISBN 978-0-8032-9819-4
- Williams, Pete (2006). The Draft: A Year Inside the NFL's Search for Talent. New York: St. Martin's Press. ISBN 978-0-312-35438-1
- Willis, Chris (2010). The Man Who Built the National Football League: Joe F. Carr. Lanham, MD: Scarecrow Press, Inc. ISBN 978-0-8108-7669-9
- Yost, Mark (2006). Tailgating, Sacks and Salary Caps. Chicago: Kaplan Publishing. ISBN 978-1-4195-2600-8
