= Carl Storck =

American football player, coach, and executive (1892–1950)

- Storck in 1935
- Born: Carl H. Storck; November 14, 1892; Dayton, Ohio, U.S.
- Died: March 13, 1950 (aged 57); Dayton, Ohio, U.S.
- Education: Stivers (OH)

3rd President of the NFL
- In office May 20, 1939 – April 4, 1941
- Preceded by: Joseph Carr
- Succeeded by: Elmer Layden

Vice president of the NFL
- In office 1928–1939

Secretary–Treasurer of the NFL
- In office 1921–1927

Treasurer of the NFL
- In office 1927–1939
- Football career

Career history
- Dayton Triangles (1922–1926)

Head coaching record
- Career: 8–26–4 (.263)
- Coaching profile at Pro Football Reference
- Executive profile at Pro Football Reference

Carl H. Storck (born November 14, 1892 – March 13, 1950) was a co-founder of the National Football League (NFL), as well as the founding owner of the Dayton Triangles. He was also the Triangles coach from 1922 to 1926. Storck served as the NFL's secretary-treasurer from 1921 to 1939 and president from 1939 to 1941.

== Biography ==
=== Early life ===
Carl Storck was born November 14, 1892, in Dayton, Ohio. He lived in that city throughout his life, attending Stivers High School, where he was a three sport athlete — a football halfback, basketball guard, and a sprinter and shot-putter on the track and field squad.

After graduating from high school in 1913, Storck pursued a career in the YMCA movement. He attended the YMCA's preparatory training course at Lake Geneva before accepting a position as second assistant physical education director for the Dayton YMCA in July 1914.

On October 1, 1916, Storck left for Chicago to attend the YMCA Training School there. He was simultaneously made the physical director of the Sears and Roebuck Company YMCA club in Chicago.

Storck returned to Dayton in 1919, where he took a position with the personnel department of the General Motors Corporation there. He remained in that professional capacity in addition to his football avocation through the first half of the 1930s.

After his return, Storck took the reins as manager of the Dayton Triangles professional basketball team. While successful on the court, the team was plagued by poor attendance, however, resulting in an abrupt shutting down of home games and completion of a truncated schedule on the road. It would not be the last time that lack of fan support in Dayton interfered with Storck's best-laid plans.

=== Dayton Triangles ===
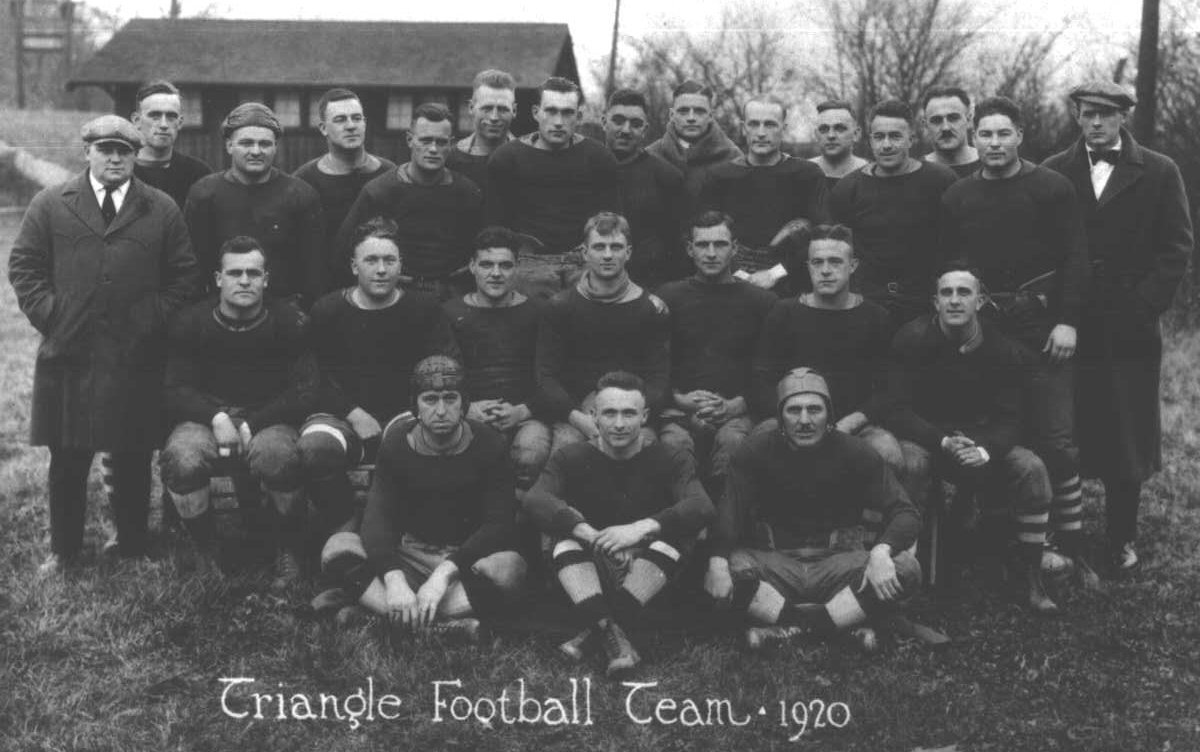
Storck (top left) with the Triangles in 1920.

After his return to Dayton from Chicago, Storck tried his hand at professional football, playing weekends for the St. Marys Cadets before assuming the helm of the venerable Dayton Triangles as player-coach. In this capacity as head of the Triangles, Storck became a founder of the National Football League, representing the club at the September 17, 1920, meeting at Ralph Hay's Hupmobile dealership which formally organized the American Professional Football Association, forerunner of the NFL.

The Triangles would have trouble competing in the increasingly competitive NFL, however, and would be plagued by poor attendance throughout their existence.

Storck would remain head of the Triangles franchise until its sale in 1928 to Bill Dwyer, who moved the team to Brooklyn and renamed them the Brooklyn Dodgers.

=== League officer ===
Storck served as secretary-treasurer of the National Football League from 1921 to 1939.

Upon the death of Joe Carr, Storck served as president of the NFL during its 1939 and 1940 seasons.

=== The NFL restructures ===
As the public presence of the NFL grew, it sought to professionalize its apparatus. The ten owners of the NFL came to a decision in 1940 to supplant the role of league president by following the path blazed by Major League Baseball by hiring and empowering a prominent Commissioner. Corinne Griffith, wife of Washington Redskins owner George Preston Marshall, recalled this process in her 1947 memoir: "A big name was desired by all. Draft meetings were postponed, schedules sidetracked, and football players forgotten. The hunt for a big name began. Every living famous name in the United States was suggested, I believe."

Elmer Layden as NFL Commissioner in 1941.

Former Notre Dame great Elmer Layden, an undersized fullback who gained fame as a member of Knute Rockne's legendary "Four Horsemen" backfield of 1924, was decided upon. A lucrative five-year contract was bestowed upon Layden to induce him to leave his comfortable position as head coach and athletic director of Notre Dame.

The restructuring changed the league's leadership, and Carl Storck's position was removed. As a result, Storck later resigned from his role as president. He had given twenty years of his life to the NFL as a league official and had performed his duties capably. He was not the subject of criticism during his tenure as president. Now he was seemingly rendered a veritable minister without portfolio or even function.

Initially, Storck stated that he would remain on the job as league president if the owners defined his duties in a contract. However, on April 4, 1941, he abruptly reversed course and announced that he would be resigning the position "for the best interests of the game".

=== Life outside football ===
Storck worked full-time as a foreman in the Inspection and Packing Department of the National Cash Register Company. He then worked as assistant manager at Delco.

In 1939, Storck served as president of the Dayton Wings baseball franchise of the Middle Atlantic League.

=== Illness and death ===
At the time of his resignation, Storck was seriously ill with Neurasthenia. He had been bedridden for seven weeks prior to his resignation and was partially paralyzed on the right side of his body. He retired from Delco in 1942 due to ill health. Storck died on March 13, 1950, at a nursing home in Dayton.
