= Edwin C. Moon =

District Attorney of Mercer County, Pennsylvania
- In office 1936–1948
- Preceded by: J. W. Nelson
- Succeeded by: John R. Boland

Personal details
- Born: July 7, 1902 Mercer, Pennsylvania, U.S.
- Died: January 3, 1989 (aged 86) Greenville, Pennsylvania, U.S.
- Resting place: Mercer Citizens Cemetery; Mercer, Pennsylvania
- Party: Republican
- Occupation: Lawyer; Harness track manager

Edwin C. Moon (July 7, 1902 – January 3, 1989) was an American attorney and harness racing executive who was district attorney of Mercer County, Pennsylvania and general manager of Fairmount Park, Randall Park, and Liberty Bell Park.

== Early life ==
Moon was the son of J. C. Moon, a leading harness racing trainer and driver in Western Pennsylvania. Edwin Moon followed in his father's footsteps, with his most successful season as a driver coming in 1931, when he won four of the five races he competed in that year. He owned a stable of horses that competed in Pennsylvania and Ohio.

== District attorney ==
Moon was admitted to the Mercer County bar in 1930 and joined the firm of Stranahan & Sampson in Mercer, Pennsylvania. In 1935, Moon defeated Hiram Drake 20,046 votes to 13,176 to become district attorney of Mercer County. He was sworn in on January 6, 1936. Moon's highest profile case came in 1943, when he tried 20-year old farmhand William A. Morell for the murders of Helen Wilson, Catherine Wilson, and Robert McKay. Morell had allegedly killed the three after he found out that his girlfriend, Janice Graham, was having an affair with their boss, Everett Wilson. Morell contented that Graham had strangled Helen Wilson after she confronted her about the affair with her husband, then shot Catherine Wilson (Everett Wilson's mother) and Robert McKay (another farmhand). Morell was found guilty of voluntary manslaughter in the death of Helen Wilson, but acquitted on the two other counts. Moon then tried Graham for the murders, but she was found not guilty on all counts. Everett Wilson, who was out of the state during the murders and refused to return to testify at Morell's trial, was found guilty of absconding as a witness. Moon did not run for reelection in 1947 and returned to private practice.

== Harness racing ==
In 1947, Moon and his brother-in-law Dan Parish acquired a lease on Fairmount Park in Collinsville, Illinois. Parish served as the track's president while Moon was the vice president and track manager. The pair later purchased the track and continued to manage it until 1954, when the sold it to James F. Edwards.

In 1957, Parish led a group of Pittsburgh businessmen that purchased Randall Park from Saul Silberman for a reported $4 million. Moon was once again brought on board as vice president and general manager. In 1960, the track was purchased by Edward J. DeBartolo Sr., who also owned the neighboring Thistledown thoroughbred race track, for $4.2 million.

In 1962, Moon was named assistant to the president in charge of operations at the soon-to-open Liberty Bell Park. He later returned to Fairmount Park under the ownership of Ogden Recreation. He retired in 1975.

== Death ==
Moon died on January 3, 1989 at Greenville Regional Hospital in Greenville, Pennsylvania.
