= Happy Hundred =

Group of NFL investors

The "Happy Hundred", also known as the "100 Brothers", and officially known as Eagles Sports, Inc. was a group of investors who owned the Philadelphia Eagles franchise of the National Football League (NFL) from 1949 to 1963. The group was headed by Philadelphia trucking magnate James P. Clark, the majority owner. Clark rounded up 100 Philadelphia investors to invest $3,000 each to purchase the team for $250,000 from Alexis "Lex" Thompson on January 15, 1949.

The Happy Hundred included

- James P. Clark, trucking magnate and former chairman of the Philadelphia Democratic city committee
- Frank McNamee, theater manager and former regional director of the War Assets Administration
- Austin Meehan, sheriff of Philadelphia County, Pennsylvania
- Vincent P. McDevitt, legal counsel for the Philadelphia Electric Company
- Al Paul Lefton, advertising executive
- Paul C. Lewis, owner of a vending machine company
- James Peterson, banker
- Harry Sylk, pharmaceutical company executive
- Potter Wear, newspaper publisher
- John Tyson, insurance executive

Clark served as the team president from 1949 to 1953, but gave up the position due to business pressure. He was succeeded by Frank McNamee, but remained with the organization as vice president and chairman. In 1950, the group attempted to purchase the Philadelphia Athletics Major League Baseball team.

The Eagles won two NFL Championships while under ownership of the "Happy Hundred," in 1949 and 1960. By his death in 1962, Clark owned 20 percent of the team, and only 65 investors of the original "Happy Hundred" remained. In December 1963, the "Happy Hundred" sold the club to Jerry Wolman for $5,505,000, and each investor received more than $60,000. One member of the "Happy Hundred", Leonard Tose, tried to buy the team from the majority owners in 1956 with a group of his own, but was unsuccessful. In 1969, Tose eventually bought the Eagles from Wolman and owned the team until 1985.

Bill Mackrides, the starting quarterback for the Eagles in 1948, claimed that the "Happy Hundred" was a sham. He said, "That's all pure myth. It made for a good story and headlines but the truth is Lex Thompson sold about 60 shares to Jim Clark. Clark had a friend who owned another 20 shares. To this day, no one knows that."

Such an ownership group would not be permitted under current NFL bylaws, which requires that one general partner hold at least a 30% stake in the team and limits the number of people who can hold interest in a club organized as a corporation to 25.
