= 1959 NFL season =

American football season

Regular season
- Duration: September 26 – December 13, 1959
- East Champions: New York Giants
- West Champions: Baltimore Colts

Championship Game
- Champions: Baltimore Colts

NFL teams: West, East

The 1959 NFL season marked the 40th regular season of the National Football League. It was the 14th and final season overseen by commissioner Bert Bell, as he died of a heart attack on October 11.

A twelve-game season was played, culminating in a league championship game between the Western Division winning Baltimore Colts and the New York Giants, winners of the Eastern Division. The Colts emerged victorious in the battle between the league's best offense and its best defense with a fourth quarter comeback, winning by a score of 31–16.

Colts quarterback Johnny Unitas, who led the league in passing yards and passing touchdowns, was selected as the Most Valuable Player of the 1959 NFL season.

== Season history ==
=== Draft ===
The 1959 NFL draft was held on December 1, 1958, and January 21, 1959, at Philadelphia's Warwick Hotel. Thirty rounds of selections were conducted, with a total of 360 players selected by the 12 teams of the league.

With the first pick, the Green Bay Packers selected quarterback Randy Duncan from the University of Iowa.

=== Significant events ===
In September, roster limits were increased by one, to 36 players per team.

Tragedy struck on October 11 as commissioner Bert Bell suffered a fatal heart attack at Philadelphia's Franklin Field while watching the Eagles host the Pittsburgh Steelers. He died at age 65 at the nearby university hospital; league treasurer Austin Gunsel was named interim commissioner for the rest of the season.

The Chicago Cardinals played their final season in Chicago before relocating to St. Louis for the following season.

In the NFL Championship Game on December 27, the Baltimore Colts defeated the New York Giants for the second year in a row.

=== Statistical leaders ===
For the third consecutive season, running back Jim Brown of the Cleveland Browns lead the NFL in rushing, gaining a total of 1329 yards on 290 touches, an average of 4.6 yards per carry. Brown's 14 touchdowns scored tied for the league high with wide receiver Raymond Berry of the Colts.

Leading the NFL with 3,899 yards passing was Colts quarterback John Unitas, who also lead all quarterbacks with 32 passing touchdowns against 14 interceptions. Unitas also led the league in both attempts and completions, going 193 for 367 (52.6%) for the year. The best completion percentage in the league (58.64%) was posted by Milt Plum of the Browns, who narrowly edged out Bill Wade of the Los Angeles Rams (58.62%).

Topping the league in receiving was Raymond Berry of the Colts, who hauled down 66 passes for 959 yards, an average of 14.5 yards per reception. Berry's closest competitor was 6'3" end Del Shofner of the Rams, who posted 936 yards gained on 47 receptions, for an average of 19.9 yards per catch.

The leading punter for 1959 was Yale Lary of the Detroit Lions, with an average of 47.1 yards on his 45 punts, according to official statistics.

Defensive statistics like sacks and tackles were not recorded during this era of professional football, with interceptions the sole metric recorded. Three players tied with 7 interceptions during the 12-game season — Dean Derby of the Steelers and a pair of Colts, defensive halfback (cornerback) Milt Davis and linebacker Don Shinnick.

The top defense of the 1959 season was that of the New York Giants, who allowed just 170 points for the year (14.2 points per game). The top offense belonged to the Baltimore Colts, who racked up 374 total points (31.2 points per game) during the regular season.

=== Division races ===
The NFL had six teams in each division; each played a home-and-away game against the other five division teams, and two games outside the division. The Bears and Cardinals, and the Redskins and Colts, faced each other in an interdivision game each year, as they were close geographic rivals.

After the second week, when the 1–1–0 Giants had to share the Eastern Division lead with all five of the other clubs, the Giants won seven of the next eight games to clinch the title in Week Ten. In the Western Division, the San Francisco 49ers, who had come close (1952, 1953, 1954, and 1957) 4 times since joining the NFL, were 6–1 and had a two-game lead over their closest rival, the 4–3 Colts. In Week Nine, though, the 49ers lost in Baltimore, 45–14 (November 22) and they shared the lead at 6–3–0. Two weeks later, San Francisco had the home field advantage when they faced the Colts for a rematch. Baltimore won again, 34–14 and clinched the title the following week.

Week	Western		Eastern	
1	3 teams (Bal, GB, SF)	1–0–0	3 teams (Cards, NYG, Pit)	1–0–0
2	Tie (GB and SF)	2–0–0	6 teams (Cards, Cle, NYG, Phi, Pit, Was)	1–1–0
3	Green Bay Packers	3–0–0	3 teams (NYG, Phi, Was)	2–1–0
4	3 teams (Bal, GB, SF)	3–1–0	New York Giants	3–1–0
5	Tie (Bal, SF)	4–1–0	New York Giants	4–1–0
6	San Francisco 49ers	5–1–0	New York Giants	5–1–0
7	San Francisco 49ers	6–1–0	New York Giants	6–1–0
8	San Francisco 49ers	6–2–0	Tie (Cle, NYG)	6–2–0
9	Tie (Bal, SF)	6–3–0	New York Giants	7–2–0
10	Tie (Bal, SF)	7–3–0	New York Giants	8–2–0
11	Baltimore Colts	8–3–0	New York Giants	9–2–0
12	Baltimore Colts	9–3–0	New York Giants	10–2–0

== Final standings ==
NFL Eastern Conference
	W	L	T	PCT	CONF	PF	PA	STK
New York Giants	10	2	0	.833	8–2	284	170	W4
Philadelphia Eagles	7	5	0	.583	6–4	268	278	L1
Cleveland Browns	7	5	0	.583	6–4	270	214	W1
Pittsburgh Steelers	6	5	1	.545	6–4	257	216	W1
Washington Redskins	3	9	0	.250	2–8	185	350	L5
Chicago Cardinals	2	10	0	.167	2–8	234	324	L6

Note: Tie games were not officially counted in the standings until 1972.

NFL Western Conference
	W	L	T	PCT	CONF	PF	PA	STK
Baltimore Colts	9	3	0	.750	9–1	374	251	W5
Chicago Bears	8	4	0	.667	6–4	252	196	W7
San Francisco 49ers	7	5	0	.583	5–5	255	237	L2
Green Bay Packers	7	5	0	.583	6–4	248	246	W4
Detroit Lions	3	8	1	.273	2–8	203	275	L1
Los Angeles Rams	2	10	0	.167	2–8	242	315	L8

== NFL Championship Game ==
Baltimore 31, NY Giants 16 at Memorial Stadium in Baltimore, Maryland, on December 27.

== Awards ==
Most Valuable Player	Johnny Unitas, quarterback, Baltimore Colts
Coach of the Year	Vince Lombardi, Green Bay

== Coaching changes ==
- Green Bay Packers: Ray McLean was replaced by Vince Lombardi.
- San Francisco 49ers: Frankie Albert was replaced by Red Hickey.
- Washington Redskins: Joe Kuharich was replaced by Mike Nixon.

== Stadium changes ==
- The Chicago Cardinals decided to not play at Comiskey Park during the 1959 season, and instead play four games at Soldier Field and two at Metropolitan Stadium in Bloomington, Minnesota
