= Journal of Sports Economics =

- Discipline: Economics
- Language: English
- Edited by: Dennis Coates

Publication details
- History: 2000-present
- Publisher: SAGE Publications in association with the North American Association of Sports Economists
- Frequency: 8/year
- Impact factor: 1.107 (2017)

Standard abbreviations
- ISO 4: J. Sports Econ.

Indexing
- ISSN: 1527-0025 (print); 1552-7794 (web)
- LCCN: sn99009381
- OCLC no.: 928509968

Links
- Journal homepage; Online access; Online archive

The Journal of Sports Economics is a peer-reviewed academic journal published by SAGE Publications in association with the North American Association of Sports Economists covering the economics of sports. It was established by economist Leo "Harold" Kahane in 2000. The editor-in-chief is Dennis Coates (University of Maryland, Baltimore).

== Abstracting and indexing ==
The journal is abstracted and indexed in Scopus and the Social Sciences Citation Index. According to the Journal Citation Reports, the journal has a 2017 impact factor of 1.107.
