= Austin Gunsel =

American football executive, former FBI agent (1909–1974)

3rd Commissioner of the NFL (interim)
- In office October 11, 1959 – January 26, 1960
- Preceded by: Bert Bell
- Succeeded by: Pete Rozelle

Investigative chair of the NFL
- In office 1952–1956

Treasurer of the NFL
- In office 1956–1966

Personal details
- Born: Austin H. Gunsel; April 2, 1909 Irvington, New Jersey, U.S.
- Died: June 17, 1974 (aged 65) Wynnewood, Pennsylvania, U.S.
- Education: University of Pennsylvania (BS)

Austin H. Gunsel (April 2, 1909 – June 17, 1974) was the interim Commissioner of the National Football League from 1959 to 1960, following the death of Bert Bell on October 11, 1959.

== Education ==
Gunsel was born in Irvington, New Jersey and is a graduate of the Wharton School of the University of Pennsylvania.

== Career ==
Gunsel joined the Federal Bureau of Investigation in 1939. He served as both J. Edgar Hoover's administrative assistant and as a special agent for the Bureau, and during his crime-fighting career, served in the New York City, Detroit and Chicago field offices.

In 1952, Gunsel was hired by the NFL to head the league's investigative department, a move made in response to commissioner Bert Bell's fear of a scandal damaging the league's image. Gunsel became league treasurer in 1956, holding the post until his retirement ten years later. He served as acting commissioner of the NFL after Bell's death in October 1959.

Gunsel and San Francisco 49ers attorney Marshall Leahy were seen as the front-runners for commissioner. On January 20, 1960, Leahy received 7 votes to Gunsel's 5, which was short of the two-thirds needed to be elected commissioner. Gunsel was soon dropped from consideration and after an eight-day deadlock, the owners selected Los Angeles Rams general manager Pete Rozelle as a compromise candidate. Gunsel stayed on as NFL treasurer until his retirement on July 1, 1966.

== Personal life ==
At the age of 65, Gunsel died at Lankenau Hospital in Wynnewood, Pennsylvania.
