= Commissioner of the NFL =

CEO of the National Football League in the US

Commissioner of the National Football League
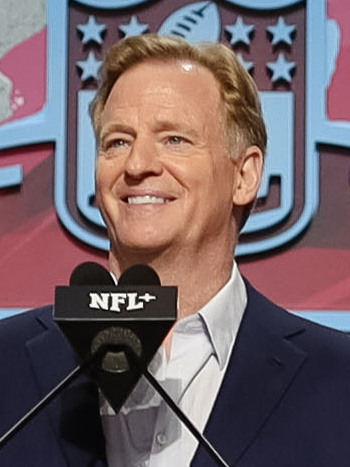
- Incumbent; Roger Goodell since September 1, 2006
- Inaugural holder: Elmer Layden
- Formation: January 17, 1941
- Website: nfl.com

The commissioner of the National Football League is the chief executive of the National Football League (NFL). The position was created in 1941. The current commissioner is Roger Goodell, who assumed office on September 1, 2006. Since the death of Paul Tagliabue on November 9, 2025, Goodell is the only living NFL commissioner.

Until 1941, the NFL's chief executive was the league president. On January 17, 1941, the NFL franchise owners amended the league's constitution to change the chief executive's title from "president" to "commissioner".

== Temporary Secretary ==
=== Ralph Hay (1920) ===
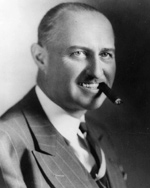
Ralph Hay

In 1920, the Canton Bulldogs were one of 14 teams to form the American Professional Football Association (APFA), which would become the National Football League (NFL) two years later. Bulldogs owner Ralph Hay was named the first head of the league (the title was officially "Temporary Secretary" until a permanent president could be chosen).

Hay did make one notable contribution in his short tenure as Temporary Secretary. Vernon Maginnis, who operated one of Akron's professional teams in 1919, wanted to field a team under the name of the Massillon Tigers in 1920. Hay was unimpressed with Maginnis, as the team he had led in 1919 was not a success and Hay did not believe that a traveling team was deserving of the Massillon Tigers name. Hay sought another investor for the Tigers, but because the Tigers of the 1910s had been operating at major financial losses (Hay's primary reason for seeking a credible Tigers team was that Tigers games were major financial successes—for their opponents) and most of its players had defected to start the Cleveland Tigers, potential owners such as F.J. Griffiths and Cupid Black either balked at or ignored overtures to run the Tigers in 1920. With no credible owner stepping forward, Hay claimed the Massillon Tigers as his own, immediately announced it would not play in 1920, and prohibited all teams in the league from playing "any other Massillon Tigers team" such as Maginnis's. The Tigers, while technically listed as a charter member of the league, never played in it, and became the first team to be rejected as a member.

== Presidents ==
=== Jim Thorpe (1920–1921) ===
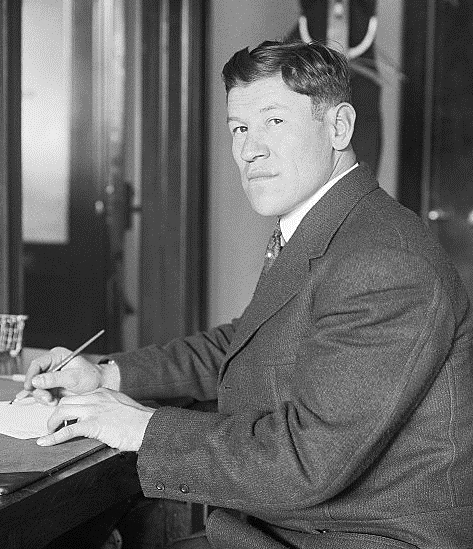
Jim Thorpe

Hay chose his own running back, Jim Thorpe, as the league's inaugural President; Hay believed Thorpe's status and fame as an athlete would bring instant credibility to the league. Thorpe was nominally the APFA's first president; however, he spent most of the year playing for Canton.

Thorpe nominally oversaw what was in its first year a haphazard and somewhat informal league, not unlike the loose coalitions of squads such as the Ohio League, Western Pennsylvania League and New York League that had played prior to the APFA's formation. League teams regularly played those outside the league, and Thorpe allowed those games to be counted in the standings. As a result, there is some dispute whether a handful of teams, including the Chicago Tigers and Buffalo All-Americans, ever actually joined the league at all. His greatest personal achievement as league president was bringing his Bulldogs to New York City for a game against the All-Americans; this game, in which the All-Americans won 7–3, was played in front of approximately 20,000 fans at the Polo Grounds, a rousing success for the nascent league.

By the April 1921 league meetings, the question of who had actually won the league championship (and thus the rights to the Brunswick-Balke Collender Cup) was still unresolved, as three teams (possibly four) laid claim to the title; there were even questions as to whether the league would survive beyond its first season, as the meeting had been postponed three months. Thorpe was missing from that meeting, never to return to his post, as was vice-president Stan Cofall, leaving secretary Art Ranney to preside over the meeting (and future league president Carl Storck as secretary).

=== Joseph Carr (1921–1939) ===
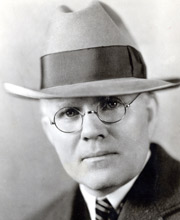
Joseph Carr

At the same meeting where this dispute was resolved in favor of Ranney's own Akron Pros, Joseph Carr, owner of the Columbus Panhandles, was named league president. Carr moved the Association's headquarters to Columbus, drafted a league constitution and by-laws, gave teams territorial rights, developed membership criteria for the franchises, and issued formal standings for the first time, so that the APFA would have a clear champion. The Association's membership increased to 22 teams. Carr first set a deadline for the season to be completed and a minimum number of league games to be played in order to win the league championship. This led to standardized schedules and prevented teams from scheduling non-league teams to pad their win columns.

==== Contracts ====
After taking office, Carr began cleaning up the problems surrounding professional football. By 1925, he introduced a standard player's contract, fashioned after the ones being used in pro baseball, so players could not jump from one team to another. Carr also declared that players under contract from the previous season could not be approached by another team unless first declared a free agent, thus introducing the reserve clause to professional football.

==== Amateur issues ====
In the early days of professional football, the game was shunned by many in the college ranks. Fearing that the pro game tainted the college game, many college administrators barred players from having anything to do with the pros. Carr would try to attack this problem and bring a peace between the pros and amateur ranks.

==== Green Bay Packers ====
The first major challenge to Carr's authority came at the end of the 1921 season, when the Green Bay Packers, who had joined the APFA that year, admitted to having used college players under assumed names. Carr immediately issued the Packers an indefinite suspension from the league, declaring that the Packers had breached both APFA rules and the public trust. However, a few months later, a group headed by Packers coach and future Hall of Famer Curly Lambeau applied for, and was granted, the Green Bay franchise.

Prior to the 1923 season, Lambeau made an initial public offering selling shares of stock in the franchise; the Green Bay Packers Board of Directors has since become the only publicly held corporation to own a franchise in the league.

While the league has since imposed rules that require a controlling owner to hold a minimum 30% stake in the team, limit the number of owners a franchise can have to a maximum of 24, and bans any publicly owned companies from owning teams, the Packers are exempt from these rules under a grandfather clause.

==== Grange rule ====
When Red Grange, a star player at the University of Illinois, turned pro by joining the Chicago Bears immediately after his final college football game, college officials everywhere criticized the league. Ernie Nevers, another All-American player, did the same thing a few days later. To help ease tensions and promote the professional game in the college circles, Carr established a rule prohibiting college players to sign with professional teams until after their class had graduated. These decisions gave the NFL credibility and much needed support from the colleges and universities from across the country.

==== Milwaukee Badgers ====
In 1925 it was revealed that the Milwaukee Badgers used four high school boys in a hastily arranged game with the Chicago Cardinals. As a result, the Badgers were fined $500 and given 90 days to dispose of its assets and retire from the league. Though finding no evidence to suggest the Cardinals management was aware of the status of the four youths before the game, Carr nonetheless fined the club $1000 for participating in the game. Art Foltz, the Cardinals player who confessed to having made the “introductions", was banned from play in the NFL for life.

==== Pottsville Maroons ====
As in 1925, the Pottsville Maroons, a first year NFL team, played an exhibition game against a team of former Notre Dame stars including the famous "Four Horsemen”. The game was played at Philadelphia's Shibe Park which was within the protected territory of the Frankford Yellow Jackets, who were playing a league game just a few miles away at Frankford Stadium. On three occasions prior to the game, Carr reportedly warned the Pottsville management not to play the game, "under all penalties that the league could inflict”. Ignoring Carr's warnings, the game was played as scheduled. However, the Maroons stated that Carr knew of the game and had allowed it to take place. For this act, the Pottsville Maroons were fined $500 and had their franchise forfeited; as a result, the team was stripped of their NFL title, and it was given to the Chicago Cardinals. However, Carr's decision and handling of the situation are still being protested by many sports historians, as well as by the people of Pottsville, Pennsylvania, and controversy still surrounds who actually won the 1925 NFL Championship, since the Maroons had earlier beaten Chicago and were actually awarded the league championship before they were suspended.

==== Franchise stability ====
Carr also knew that for the league to survive, franchises needed to have a sense of stability. In his early years as president, NFL franchises constantly were setting up and then folding. From 1920 through 1932 more than 40 NFL franchises went through the league. The only two charter members to stay with the league by 1932 were the Chicago Bears and the Chicago Cardinals. In those first years, 19 teams lasted one year (one, the Tonawanda Kardex, lasted only one game) and 11 teams lasted two years. Carr envisioned the day the NFL could compete with Major League Baseball as America's favorite spectator sport. While few really took him seriously (Leo Lyons, the owner of the Rochester Jeffersons, was one of the few who had the same belief), he thought in time it could happen and devised a plan to make it happen.

Carr knew that the NFL's success rested on franchise stability. He also believed that franchises had to be located in the biggest cities, just like those in major league baseball. This resulted in the NFL shaking off its "town team" roots. His own Panhandles, for instance, disappeared by 1929 (after playing as the Tigers from 1923 onward).

Carr went out of his way to recruit financially capable owners. Beginning with New York City, the largest city in the country and a market the NFL had tried to enter since the first season (see, for instance, the ill-fated first incarnation of the New York Giants), Carr convinced successful bookmaker Tim Mara to start a club. The club became known as the New York Giants and it is still partly owned by Mara's family.

He continued to recruit stable owners and eventually placed teams in larger cities by moving the Dayton Triangles to become the Brooklyn Tigers in 1930, establishing the Pittsburgh Steelers and Philadelphia Eagles in 1933, moving the Portsmouth Spartans to become the Detroit Lions, establishing the Cleveland Rams in 1937, and the Washington Redskins in 1937 after that franchise moved from Boston. By 1937 the National Football League and Major League Baseball were almost identical, with 9 out of 10 NFL franchises in MLB cities. Only Green Bay, Wisconsin, did not have a major league baseball team. By placing teams in big cities the NFL gained the stability it needed and established a game plan for a bright future.

=== Carl Storck (1939–1941) ===
Carl Storck

Upon Carr's death, former Dayton Triangles owner Carl Storck, the league's secretary-treasurer since 1921, was named to succeed him. His most notable act was the refusal to allow the creation of the Pennsylvania Keystoners, a proposed merger of the Philadelphia Eagles and what would become the Pittsburgh Steelers. Storck remained president after the position of Commissioner was created. He was upset by the owners' decision to replace him, as he had served in the league office for 20 years (fifteen without pay) and had not received any criticism from the owners during his tenure as president. He stated that he would stay on as president if the owners defined his duties in a contract. However, on April 4, 1941, he suddenly announced that he was resigning "for the best interests of the game". After Storck's resignation, the owners chose to make Layden president as well as Commissioner.

== Commissioners ==
On January 17, 1941, the NFL franchise owners amended the league's constitution to change the chief executive's title from "president" to "commissioner." This was part of an attempt to bring all professional football leagues under the authority of a single commissioner with powers similar to those of Commissioner of Baseball Kenesaw Mountain Landis. The owners had already reached working agreements with the American Football Association and the Dixie League and invited all other leagues, including the American Football League, to join.

=== Elmer Layden (1941–1946) ===
Elmer Layden

==== Election ====
At their January 17 meeting the owners also narrowed the list of candidates to eight people. They pledged not to reveal who the finalists were, although it was reported that former United States Postmaster General and Democratic National Committee Chairman James Farley was considered for the job. National reports also linked baseball executive Branch Rickey, at the time working for the St. Louis Cardinals in the National League, with the post. Chicago Tribune journalist Arch Ward was offered the position of commissioner, but he turned it down and suggested Elmer Layden for the position.

Layden, famous from his playing days as a member of the Four Horsemen, resigned as head coach of the Notre Dame Fighting Irish football team on February 3, 1941, to accept the position of Commissioner of Professional Football. His appointment was not voted on by the entire league, which upset owners Alexis Thompson, Bert Bell, and Dan Topping. Bell stated that Layden had been "railroaded" into office over other finalists (Philadelphia political leader John B. Kelly Sr. and University of Minnesota athletic director Frank G. McCormick, the latter of whom had yet to be interviewed). Chicago Bears owner George Halas contended that Layden's hiring was legal because it had been agreed upon by a majority of owners. Layden was signed to a five-year contract with an annual salary of $20,000.

==== Tenure as commissioner ====
In five years as Commissioner, Layden saw the NFL through the World War II years, in which teams had to use many men of inferior abilities as replacements while most of the regulars were fighting in the war (as did Major League Baseball). During this period a few teams temporarily merged due to lack of manpower, most notably the Pittsburgh Steelers, who merged with the Philadelphia Eagles and earned the nickname the Phil-Pitt Steagles (unlike the Keystoners idea, which was intended to be permanent, the Steagles lasted only one year) in 1943 and then merged with the Chicago Cardinals to form Card-Pitt in 1944. The Cleveland Rams ceased operations for the 1943 season.

Layden's tenure as NFL commissioner came to an end in January 1946. After Brooklyn owner Dan Topping withdrew his team from the league to join the new All-America Football Conference, some owners opposed renewing Layden's contract, as they felt that he was too much of a gentleman and not forceful enough to deal with the competing league. Layden resigned on January 11, 1946.

=== Bert Bell (1946–1959) ===
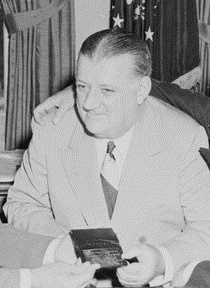
Bert Bell

On the day of Layden's resignation, Pittsburgh Steelers co-owner Bert Bell was elected commissioner and given a three-year contract at $20,000 per year. He subsequently sold his stake in the Steelers to co-owner Art Rooney. A year later, the contract was changed to a five-year pact at the same salary, a move that was followed in 1949 by a ten-year agreement that boosted his annual pay to $30,000.

Bell's salary was raised to $40,000 in 1951, which was extended for a dozen years in 1954.

Before his appointment, Bell had been active in the NFL since its beginning, first occasionally playing against them as a member of the Union Quakers of Philadelphia, then a decade later as co-founder, owner, general manager and head coach of the Eagles, then as part-owner of the Steelers.

Among his accomplishments as commissioner, Bell merged the league with the All-America Football Conference, and did battle with the Canadian Football League over scheduling and player rights. He also coined the phrase, "On any given Sunday, any team can beat any other team."

One of his first major acts dealt with a gambling scandal that marred the 1946 NFL Championship game. In response, he successfully lobbied legislators in virtually every state to enact laws that made it a crime for an athlete not to report a bribe attempt.

In addition to all these duties, he also single-handedly plotted out league schedules each season on his dining-room table by using a giant checkerboard. He created the revenue-sharing system that enables the small-market teams to make larger profits and remain competitive.

He also embraced the idea of television blackouts for home teams, especially after watching the Los Angeles Rams lose money after they televised all of their 1950 season games. However, he was seen as being a little too strict when he refused to lift a blackout for Detroit viewers to watch the sold out 1957 NFL Championship between the Lions and the Cleveland Browns, claiming it would be considered "dishonest" to the paying customers.

Bell died of a heart attack on October 11, 1959, at Philadelphia's Franklin Field, while watching a game between the team he co-founded, the Eagles, and the Steelers. The Eagles actually scored the game-winning touchdown the moment Bell died, as fans were paying more attention to Bell than the game. He had been under a doctor's care for two years and had recovered from a heart attack the previous February. Few knew that at the time, Bell was planning to retire as commissioner in order to regain ownership of the Eagles before the next season.

==== Austin Gunsel (acting commissioner, 1959–1960) ====
In 1952, Gunsel was hired by the NFL to head the league's investigative department, a move made in response to commissioner Bert Bell's fear of a scandal damaging the league's image. Gunsel became league treasurer in 1956, holding the post until his retirement ten years later.

He served as acting president of the NFL after Bell's death in October 1959. In January 1960 at a meeting of NFL owners, he was the early frontrunner to retain the commissioner's job, but Los Angeles Rams general manager Pete Rozelle was ultimately elected to the post on January 26 after 23 ballots.

=== Pete Rozelle (1960–1989) ===
==== Election ====
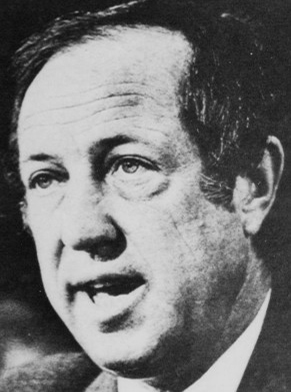
Pete Rozelle

After Bert Bell's death in 1959, Rozelle was the surprise choice for his replacement as NFL commissioner. The owners first met on January 20, 1960, and took eight ballots without any candidate receiving the two thirds vote needed to be elected. On the first ballot San Francisco 49ers attorney Marshall Leahy defeated interim commissioner Austin Gunsel 7 to 5. Gunsel was soon dropped from consideration in favor of Baltimore Colts general manager Don Kellett. On the final ballot of the day, Leahy defeated Kellett 7 to 4, but once again did not receive enough votes to be elected. Los Angeles Times special events director Paul J. Schissler and Detroit Lions President Edwin J. Anderson were proposed as compromise candidates but neither received enough support. Anderson's candidacy was thwarted by his own team, as Detroit's representative at the owners' meeting, treasurer D. Lyle Fife, believed Anderson had mismanaged the Lions. Leahy received strong opposition from four owners, Carroll Rosenbloom, Art Rooney, George Preston Marshall, and Frank McNamee, who objected to his plan to move the league office to San Francisco if he was elected. Conversely, seven other owners remained supportive of Leahy as they felt he was the best man for the job. George Halas chose to abstain from voting, as he was afraid that if he took sides he would lose support for his expansion plan.

The second owners meeting resulted in six more ballots taken without electing a commissioner. On the final ballot, Leahy once again led Kellett seven to four.

In an attempt to end the stalemate, Rooney suggested seven compromise candidates to the owners; former Congressman and NFL deputy commissioner Samuel A. Weiss, Sportsman's Park general manager and former Chicago Cardinals executive Ray Bennigsen, former Cleveland Rams general manager Chile Walsh, Philadelphia attorney Frank Sullivan, former Kentucky Governor and Baseball Commissioner Happy Chandler, Detroit Pistons general manager W. Nicholas Kerbawy, and attorney Don Miller. None of these candidates were able to end the stalemate and for the third day in a row the owners were unable to elect a commissioner.

On the fourth day of the owners meetings, the issue of electing a commissioner was not brought as the owners chose to address other league business. Two more ballots were held on day five, both ending with seven for Leahy and four for Kellett.

On the sixth day, the anti-Leahy group switched their support from Kellett back to Gunsel. However, the voting still ended 7–4–1. By the seventh day, 23 ballots had been taken without electing a commissioner.

By day eight, Leahy supporters Wellington Mara and Paul Brown realized that their candidate would not be able to win and they offered Los Angeles Rams general manager Pete Rozelle, who had been able to keep peace among his team's feuding partners, as a compromise candidate. He received eight votes to Leahy's one and three abstentions and was elected Commissioner. Rozelle gained the support of the four anti-Leahy owners by pledging to move the league office from Philadelphia to New York City instead of the West Coast.

Rozelle's original contract in 1960 was $50,000 annually for three years. In May 1962, he was granted a $10,000 bonus for 1961 and a new five-year contract at $60,000 per year.

==== 1960s ====
When Rozelle took office there were twelve teams in the NFL playing a twelve-game schedule to frequently half-empty stadiums, and only a few teams had television contracts. The NFL in 1960 was following a business model that had evolved from the 1930s. NFL sources credit Rozelle with originating gate and television profit-sharing. However, it was the rival American Football League which initiated both concepts at its formation in 1959. The revenue-sharing was a major factor in stabilizing the AFL and guaranteeing the success of its small-market teams. Rozelle recognized the value of such an arrangement, and following the lead of the rival AFL, Rozelle negotiated large television contracts to broadcast every NFL game played each season. In doing so, he not only deftly played one television network against the other, but also persuaded NFL team owners — most notably Carroll Rosenbloom of the Baltimore Colts and George Preston Marshall of the Washington Redskins — to agree to share revenues between teams, as the American Football League (AFL) had done since its inception. His business model, which emulated that of the AFL, was essentially a cartel that benefited all teams equally, from revenue sharing to the player draft.

==== JFK assassination ====
On November 24, 1963, only two days after the assassination of President John F. Kennedy, the NFL played its full schedule of seven games (untelevised due to uninterrupted coverage of the assassination, but well-attended), while the rival American Football League (AFL) postponed its four games out of respect for the fallen president. Rozelle soon came to regret his decision to have the NFL play, and frequently stated publicly that it had been his worst mistake. However, Rozelle and White House Press Secretary Pierre Salinger had been classmates at the University of San Francisco years before, and Rozelle had consulted with him. Salinger urged Rozelle to play the games. Rozelle felt that way, saying that "it has been traditional in sports for athletes to perform in times of great personal tragedy." He also said that football was Kennedy's game and the late president thrived on competition. Rozelle's "aptitude for conciliation" with the league's owners and his work in expanding the NFL, however, led to his receiving Sports Illustrated magazine's 1963 "Sportsman of the Year" award. The award was ironic, since it was the existence of the AFL that expanded the sport and forced the NFL to grant franchises to Dallas and Minnesota.

==== The AFL ====
By 1965, the rival American Football League was firmly established, with a new NBC-TV contract, and a new superstar in New York Jets quarterback Joe Namath. After an NFL team (the Giants) had signed an AFL player (the Buffalo Bills' Pete Gogolak) in early 1966, American Football League commissioner Al Davis had shaken the NFL. Davis had immediately started signing NFL stars such as Roman Gabriel, John Brodie and Mike Ditka to contracts with AFL teams. Fearful of their league's collapse, NFL owners, without the knowledge of Rozelle, approached AFL owners (without the knowledge of Davis) and requested merger talks. AFL and NFL executives including Lamar Hunt, founder of the AFL and owner of the Kansas City Chiefs, completed a plan. Rozelle is erroneously credited with forging the merger. In October 1966, he did testify to Congress to convince them to allow the merger, promising that if they permitted it, "Professional football operations will be preserved in the 23 cities and 25 stadiums where such operations are presently being conducted."; and "Every franchise of both leagues will remain in its present location." The merger was allowed, but despite Rozelle's promises, numerous NFL teams have since moved, or used the threat of moving to have cities build or improve stadiums. Following the urging of American Football League commissioner Al Davis, Rozelle also agreed to the creation of the Super Bowl and later supported the concept of Monday Night Football. NFL sources have since aggrandized Rozelle's part in both the merger and Monday Night Football. Rozelle is also often erroneously credited with introducing the concept of shared television revenues to professional football. He did advocate it for the merged NFL, but he was simply embracing the concept which had been implemented by the AFL ten years before the merger.

Following the two leagues' agreement to merge, owners of both leagues agreed in principle to follow the 1941 model of professional football governance. AFL owners agreed to recognize Rozelle as the overall chief executive of the sport and appoint a league President to serve under the NFL Commissioner. Although Rozelle was never formally invested with a title such as Commissioner of Football or Football Commissioner, he was often referred to as such by the media for the rest of the AFL's existence. AFL owners had intended for Davis to continue serving as AFL President, but he flatly refused to consider serving as a subordinate to Rozelle. After Davis resigned as AFL Commissioner, Milt Woodard (who had served as assistant commissioner under Foss and Davis) was appointed AFL President. Woodard would serve in that role for the rest of the AFL's existence.

==== 1970s ====
The 1970s saw Rozelle at the peak of his powers as a sports league commissioner. He presided over a decade of league expansion. Monday Night Football became a staple of American television viewing, and the Super Bowl became the single most watched televised event of the year. During this decade, the upstart World Football League organized, pushing player salaries higher even as it ended up in bankruptcy. Towards the end of the decade, labor unrest and litigation over issues such as the NFL Players Association and team movement to new markets foreshadowed Rozelle's decline as commissioner.

In February 1974, Rozelle agreed to a ten-year contract at $200,000 per year, effective January 1973 through December 1982. It was replaced and updated in 1977.

==== 1980s ====
The 1980s saw drug scandals and further struggle with powerful owners over team movement. Rozelle, again according to Monday Night Football commentator Howard Cosell, pushed the NFL into an internecine struggle with Al Davis concerning the movement of the Oakland Raiders franchise to Los Angeles. Other owners, such as Leonard Tose of the Philadelphia Eagles, sought to move their franchises elsewhere. Ultimately, the NFL lost its court case with Davis, and the Oakland franchise moved to Los Angeles in 1982. The sports world was very aware of the men's dislike for one another, going back to Davis' brief time as AFL commissioner in 1966. In early 1981, the Oakland Raiders won Super Bowl XV; as commissioner, Rozelle presented the Vince Lombardi Trophy to Davis. It was said by some that he used both hands to give Davis the trophy so that he wouldn't have to shake his enemy's hand. Additionally, the United States Football League launched in early 1983, pushing player salaries higher, and ultimately embroiled the league in further legal troubles; under Rozelle, the league lost an antitrust suit to the USFL in 1986 (nevertheless, the token amount of money awarded as a result forced the money-bleeding USFL to cease operations).

For nearly three decades under Rozelle, the NFL thrived and had become an American icon, despite two players' strikes and two different upstart leagues. He announced his retirement in March 1989 and stepped down in November; the number of teams in the league had grown to 28 (in 1976), and team owners presided over sizable revenues from U.S. broadcasting networks. Rozelle's annual salary in the late 1980s exceeded $1 million.

=== Paul Tagliabue (1989–2006) ===
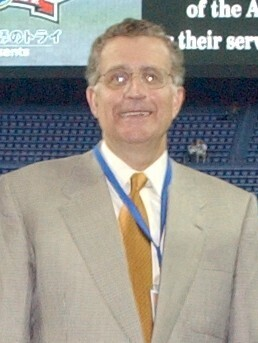
Paul Tagliabue

After serving as a lawyer for the NFL, Tagliabue was selected by NFL owners to succeed Pete Rozelle as Commissioner of the NFL in 1989.

==== Election ====
On March 22, 1989, Pete Rozelle announced that he would retire as commissioner as soon as a successor was elected. Many owners wanted Rozelle to be succeeded by two equally responsible chiefs; a president that would oversee the business aspects of the game, and a commissioner responsible for maintaining the game's integrity. A six-owner search committee consisting of Wellington Mara, Lamar Hunt, Art Modell, Robert Parins, Dan Rooney, and Ralph Wilson was formed to find candidates for the job and the firm of Heidrick & Struggles was hired to assist in the search. The committee narrowed the candidates to five finalists; New Orleans Saints general manager and minority owner Jim Finks, New Jersey Sports and Exposition Authority President and CEO Robert E. Mulcahy III, former Green Bay Packers defensive end and businessman Willie Davis, former Democratic National Committee Chairman Paul G. Kirk, and league attorney Paul Tagliabue. Housing and Urban Development Secretary and former Buffalo Bills quarterback Jack Kemp was considered for the job, but chose to remain in his cabinet post. Although committee chairman Mara had said they would present the owners with three or four candidates, the committee unanimously endorsed Finks and reached an agreement with him on a five-year contract. Although Finks ran unopposed for the job at the July 7 owners meeting, a group of eleven newer owners abstained from voting, which prevented Finks from receiving the nineteen votes necessary to become Commissioner. This group did not object to Finks' candidacy, but abstained on principle because they wanted more of a voice in the selection process, felt that they had not given enough information on the search process from the committee, were upset that the committee only recommended Finks despite promising several candidates, and were upset by the fact that the committee had begun contract negotiations with Finks before he was even elected to the post.

A second search committee was formed consisting of Mara, Hunt, Mike Lynn, Ken Behring, John Kent Cooke, and Al Davis. This committee presented the owners with four finalists; Willie Davis, Jim Finks, Paul Tagliabue, and former New York Republican State Committee Chairman J. Patrick Barrett. The second owners meeting ended in deadlock with 13 votes for Finks and 13 for Tagliabue.

A third committee, made up of five owners, was formed to present the owners with a unanimous candidate for commissioner. It was chaired by neutral owner Dan Rooney, who was joined by Finks supporters Mara and Modell and Tagliabue supporters Lynn and Pat Bowlen. At the third meeting, a compromise was reached by the two groups that would make Tagliabue commissioner and Finks president in charge of football operations. However, Finks declined this position and Tagliabue was elected commissioner by an undisclosed number of votes.

==== Tenure ====
In 1998, Tagliabue's $2.5 million annual salary was doubled to $5 million. His final contract, signed in 2004, paid Tagliabue about $8 million per year.

Two days after the terrorist attacks on the original World Trade Center and the Pentagon, Tagliabue announced that the games scheduled for the upcoming weekend were canceled. Tagliabue said the NFL was acutely aware of Commissioner Pete Rozelle's well-publicized regret not to cancel the games on the weekend following the assassination of John F. Kennedy in 1963.

During Tagliabue's tenure, the Carolina Panthers and Jacksonville Jaguars joined the league in 1995, while the Los Angeles Rams moved to St. Louis and the Los Angeles Raiders returned to Oakland, leaving Los Angeles without an NFL team; in 1996, the Cleveland Browns relocated to Baltimore and were renamed as the Baltimore Ravens; in 1997, the Houston Oilers relocated to Tennessee and became the Tennessee Titans prior to the start of the 1999 season; in that same year, the Cleveland Browns returned to the league. In 2002, the Houston Texans became the 32nd team. Both the AFC and the NFC were formed in four divisions (North, South, East and West) of four teams each. The Seattle Seahawks switched from the AFC to the NFC in 2002. New stadiums were built in Atlanta, St. Louis, Jacksonville, Charlotte, Tampa, Cleveland, Cincinnati, Pittsburgh, Denver, Foxborough, Houston, Seattle, Detroit and Philadelphia between 1992 and 2003.

=== Roger Goodell (2006–present) ===
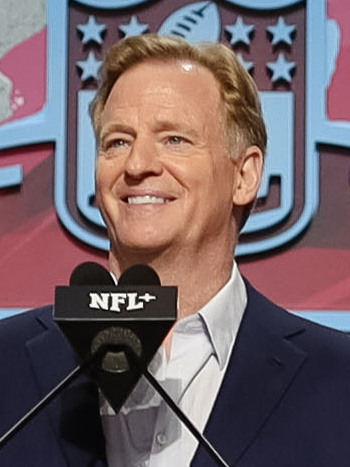
Roger Goodell

In 1987, Goodell was appointed assistant to the president of the American Football Conference (Lamar Hunt), and under the tutelage of Commissioner Paul Tagliabue filled a variety of football and business operations roles, culminating with his appointment as the NFL's Executive Vice President and Chief Operating Officer in December 2001.

As the NFL's COO, Goodell took responsibility for the league's football operations and officiating, as well as supervised league business functions. He headed NFL Ventures, which oversees the league's business units, including media properties, marketing and sales, stadium development and strategic planning.

Goodell was heavily involved in the negotiation of the league's current collective bargaining agreement. He had worked extensively with Tagliabue since the latter became commissioner in 1989. He has played an extensive role in league expansion, realignment, and stadium development, including the launch of the NFL Network and securing new television agreements as well as the latest collective bargaining agreement with the National Football League Players Association.

Goodell was chosen on August 8, 2006, to succeed Paul Tagliabue and assumed office on September 1 — the date Tagliabue set to leave office.

In November 2006, amid rumors that the NFL may expand outside the United States, Goodell stated, "I don't know if it will become a reality, but it is certainly a possibility."

In April 2007, following a year of significant scandal surrounding some NFL players' actions off-the-field, Goodell announced a new NFL Personal Conduct Policy. Tennessee Titans cornerback Pacman Jones and Cincinnati Bengals wide receiver Chris Henry were the first two players to be suspended under the new policy, and Chicago Bears defensive lineman Tank Johnson was suspended months later due to his conduct involving weapon ownership and drunk driving. On August 31, 2007, Goodell suspended Dallas Cowboys quarterbacks coach Wade Wilson for five games and fined him $100,000, and suspended New England Patriots safety Rodney Harrison four games without pay, after they admitted the use of banned substances for medical purposes and to accelerate healing, respectively. The league indicated to Wilson that his more severe penalty was because they held "people in authority in higher regard than people on the field."

On September 13, 2007, Goodell disciplined the New England Patriots and head coach Bill Belichick after New England attempted to videotape the defensive signals of the New York Jets on September 9. Belichick was fined the league maximum of $500,000 and the team itself was fined $250,000 and the loss of their first round 2008 draft pick. Goodell said he considered suspending Belichick, but decided against it because he felt the penalties were "more effective" than a suspension. He never considered forfeiture of the affected games.

In response to the New Orleans Saints bounty scandal, where players had allegedly been encouraged during previous seasons to knock certain players out of games, Goodell suspended New Orleans head coach Sean Payton (the entire 2012 season), general manager Mickey Loomis (first eight games of the 2012 season), assistant head coach Joe Vitt (first six games of the 2012 season), and former defensive coordinator Gregg Williams (indefinitely). It was the first time in modern NFL history that a head coach has been suspended for any reason. The Saints organization was fined $500,000, and forced to forfeit their second-round draft selections in 2012 and 2013. Four former Saints players (Jonathan Vilma, Anthony Hargrove, Will Smith, and Scott Fujita) were suspended after being named as ringleaders in the scandal. The players' suspensions were vacated by Goodell's designated appeals officer, former Commissioner Paul Tagliabue.

In the late summer and early autumn of 2014, a series of domestic-violence scandals broke, tarnishing Goodell's reputation, as he was seen as initially not having reacted quickly or severely enough to them. The first two players embroiled in these scandals, both running backs, were Ray Rice, whose tenure with the Baltimore Ravens was terminated and who was indefinitely suspended from the NFL after the scope of his scandal broadened, forcing Goodell to change NFL policy on its handling of domestic-violence cases, and Adrian Peterson of the Minnesota Vikings, against whom child-abuse charges were filed.

On May 11, 2015, the NFL announced that it suspended New England Patriots quarterback Tom Brady without pay for four games of the upcoming season based on "substantial and credible evidence" that Brady knew Patriots employees were deflating footballs and that he failed to cooperate with investigators. The Patriots were also fined $1 million and lost their first round pick in the 2016 NFL draft and their fourth round pick in the 2017 NFL draft. On May 14, the National Football League Players Association (NFLPA) filed an appeal of Tom Brady's four-game suspension. The NFL also announced that Goodell would preside over Brady's appeal, despite objections from the NFLPA, which requested a neutral arbitrator. On July 28, Goodell upheld the four-game suspension, citing Brady's destruction of his cell phone as a critical factor. On July 29, the NFLPA announced that they filed an injunction to prevent the NFL from enforcing the four-game suspension that commissioner Roger Goodell confirmed. On September 3, Judge Richard M. Berman threw out Brady's suspension due to a lack of fair due process for Brady. The NFL appealed the decision, eventually having Brady's suspension reinstated for 2016. Brady dropped further appeals and served the suspension .

Goodell's compensation from the league for the 2021 season was $63.9 million, more than any other professional sports commissioner in North America.

== List of presidents/commissioners ==
Heads of the NFL
Image	Holder	Start	End	Title
	Ralph Hay	1920	1920	Temporary Secretary (1920)
	Jim Thorpe	1920	1921	Presidents (1920–1941)
	Joseph Carr	1921	1939	Presidents (1920–1941)
	Carl Storck	1939	1941	Presidents (1920–1941)
	Elmer Layden	1941	1946	Commissioners (1941–present)
	Bert Bell	1946	1959	Commissioners (1941–present)
	Austin Gunsel (interim)	1959	1960	Commissioners (1941–present)
	Pete Rozelle	1960	1989	Commissioners (1941–present)
	Paul Tagliabue	1989	2006	Commissioners (1941–present)
	Roger Goodell	2006	--	Commissioners (1941–present)

== See also ==
Commissioners of major professional sports leagues in the United States and Canada:

- Commissioner of the NBA
- Commissioner of Baseball
- NHL commissioner
