= Liberty Bell Park Racetrack =

American race track

Liberty Bell Park
- Interactive map of Liberty Bell Park
- Location: Philadelphia, Pennsylvania, U.S.
- Coordinates: 40°05′15″N 74°57′41″W
- Date opened: 1963
- Date closed: 1985
- Race type: Harness racing (1963–1985); Thoroughbred racing (1969–1974)

Liberty Bell Park was an American race track in Northeast Philadelphia that held harness racing from 1963 to 1985 and Thoroughbred horse racing from 1969 to 1974.

== Development ==
In 1961, the Pennsylvania harness racing commission voted 2-1 to grant Liberty Bell Racing Association, led by Philadelphia Democratic Party and Philadelphia Eagles owner James P. Clark, the state's first parimutuel track license, with both Democratic members of the committee voting in favor of Clark and the Republican member voting against. Clark would never see the track open, as he died on April 17, 1962. His niece's husband, Michael J. O'Neill, saw the construction of the track through and was elected its first president. Edwin C. Moon, a former Mercer County, Pennsylvania district attorney who had managed tracks in Missouri and Ohio, was the track's first director of operations and Rosecroft Raceway general manager James M. Lynch became the track's first racing secretary.

Liberty Bell Park was constructed over a ten-month period at a cost of $12.5 million. The track featured a double-decker grandstand that could hold 30,000 people and a parking lot with room for 10,000 cars. As it was believed that parimutuel wagering on thoroughbred racing would soon be legalized, two tracks were constructed; a mile and 5/8 oval for trotters and a mile track with the same back and home stretch for thoroughbreds.

== Opening ==
Liberty Bell Park opened on June 7, 1963. Its first meet ran from June 7, 1963 through August 3, 1963 and attracted 510,646 patrons over 50 days of racing. In the fall of 1963, the track was leased to Art Rooney's William Penn Racing Association. That meet featured a Grand Circuit race.

In 1964, Edward J. Dougherty, O’Neill's college roommate took over as track president. That December, the widow of William J. Green Jr. (a U.S. Representative and political ally of the track's founder) announced that she would exercise an option her husband held to purchase 50% of the track's shares. The purchase price specified in the option ($50,000) was far less than their actual estimate value ($2 million).

Pennsylvania legalized parimutuel wagering on thoroughbred racing in 1968. Liberty Bell Park signed five year leases with the Eagle Downs Racing Association and Continental Thoroughbred Racing Association, who planned on racing at Liberty Bell until construction on their track in Bensalem Township, Pennsylvania was completed. $800,000 was spent to convert the track for thoroughbred racing. The track's first thoroughbred race occurred on May 31, 1969. It attracted 15,396 spectators who bet $1,160,154. Thoroughbred racing at Liberty Bell Park ended when Keystone Park opened in November 1974.

On February 6, 1971, a track-record 24,988 fans turned out to watch thoroughbred races at Liberty Bell Park. Phil Baker, general manager of the Eagle Downs and Continental Thoroughbred Racing Associations, believed that attendance would have been greater if the track had a greater capacity.

In 1973, the Hambletonian Society voted to move the Hambletonian Stakes from the DuQuoin State Fairgrounds Racetrack to Liberty Bell Park, effective 1975. The track backed out of its three-year deal the following year due to disagreements between the Hambletonian Society and John J. Rooney, whose William Penn Racing Association was to host the race.

In 1982, Raymond A. Birkbeck became president of both Liberty Bell Park and the William Penn Racing Association. He succeeded Louis J. Goffman, who died earlier that year.

== Closure ==
In 1983, Liberty Bell Park reported a deficit, which led to Governor Dick Thornburgh signing legislation to lower taxes on the state's harness tracks. Track officials contended that they would not be able to run in 1984 without the break. On October 13, 1985, Liberty Bell Park announced that it would not run in 1986 and that the property was for sale. Competition from Atlantic City casinos and the rebuilt Garden State Park Racetrack was blamed for the track's demise. On May 12, 1986, the 288-acre property was sold to Western Development Corp. for $23.3 million. The Franklin Mills shopping mall, later known as Philadelphia Mills and now known as Franklin Mall, was constructed on the site.
