= Pete Rozelle =

American football executive (1926–1996)

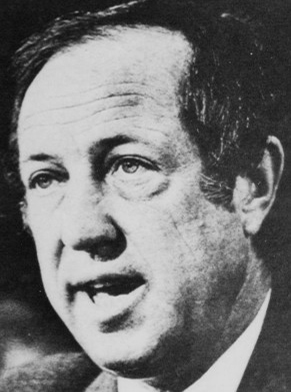
- Rozelle in 1975

4th Commissioner of the NFL
- In office January 26, 1960 – November 5, 1989
- Preceded by: Austin Gunsel (interim)
- Succeeded by: Paul Tagliabue

Personal details
- Born: Alvin Ray Rozelle; March 1, 1926 South Gate, California, U.S.
- Died: December 6, 1996 (aged 70) Rancho Santa Fe, California, U.S.
- Spouses: Jane Coupe (m. 1949–1972); Carrie Cooke (m. 1973)
- Children: 1
- Education: Compton College
- Awards: Sportsman of the Year (1963)
- Military career
- Allegiance: United States
- Branch: United States Navy
- Service years: 1944-1945
- Conflicts: World War II; Pacific Ocean Theater
- Football career
- Pro Football Hall of Fame

Alvin Ray "Pete" Rozelle (/roʊˈzɛl/; March 1, 1926 – December 6, 1996) was an American professional football executive. Rozelle served as the commissioner of the National Football League (NFL) for nearly thirty years, from January 1960 until his retirement in November 1989. He became the youngest commissioner in NFL history at the age of just 33. He is credited with making the NFL into one of the most successful sports leagues in the world.

During his tenure, Rozelle saw the NFL grow from 12 teams to 28, oversaw the creation of large television-rights deals and the creation of Monday Night Football in 1970, oversaw the 1970 AFL–NFL merger and the creation of the Super Bowl, and helped the NFL move from a twelve-game schedule to a sixteen-game schedule. By the time of his retirement, many people considered him the most powerful commissioner in sports. He was inducted into the Pro Football Hall of Fame in 1985.

== Early life ==
Born in South Gate, California, Rozelle grew up in neighboring Lynwood during the Great Depression. He graduated from Compton High School in 1944, with Duke Snider, lettering in tennis and basketball. He was drafted into the U.S. Navy in 1944 and served 18 months in the Pacific on an oil tanker.

Rozelle entered Compton Community College in 1946. While there, he worked as the student athletic news director and also worked part-time for the Los Angeles Rams as a public relations assistant. Pete Newell, head coach for the University of San Francisco Dons basketball team, came to Compton in 1948 for a recruiting visit. Impressed by Rozelle, Newell helped arrange for him to get a full scholarship to work in a similar capacity at USF.

Rozelle enrolled at USF that year and worked as a student publicist for the USF Dons athletic department. In addition to promoting the school's football team he was able to draw national attention to the Dons' 1949 National Invitation Tournament (NIT) championship basketball team. After graduating from USF in 1950, he was hired by the school as the full-time athletic news director.

In 1952, he re-joined the Rams as a PR specialist. Leaving after three years, he held a series of public relations jobs in southern California, including marketing the 1956 Olympics in Melbourne, Australia for a Los Angeles-based company. In 1957, he returned to the Rams, a disorganized, unprofitable team, lost in the growing L.A. market, as their general manager. In spite of continued struggles on the field, including a league-worst 2–10 record in 1959, he turned them into a business success in just three years.

== NFL commissioner ==
=== 1960s ===
After Bert Bell's death in October 1959, the 33-year-old Rozelle was the surprise choice for his replacement as NFL commissioner. According to Howard Cosell in his 1985 book I Never Played the Game, the owners took 23 ballots before settling on Rozelle as NFL Commissioner at a January 26, 1960, meeting.

When he took office following the 1959 season, there were twelve teams in the NFL playing a twelve-game schedule to frequently half-empty stadiums, and only a few teams had television contracts. The NFL in 1960 was following a business model that had evolved from the 1930s. One of Rozelle's early accomplishments was helping the league adopt profit-sharing of gate and television revenues. The revenue-sharing was a major factor in stabilizing the NFL and guaranteeing the success of its small-market teams. Another important contribution was Rozelle's success in negotiating large television contracts to broadcast every NFL game played each season. In doing so, he deftly played one television network against the other. In early 1962, Rozelle was re-elected to a five-year contract to remain as commissioner, with a salary continuing at $50,000 per year. Less than five months later, he was granted a $10,000 bonus (for 1961) and his annual salary was increased by $10,000 to $60,000.

==== John F. Kennedy assassination ====
After the assassination of President John F. Kennedy on November 22, 1963, Rozelle wrestled with the decision of whether to cancel that Sunday's games. Rozelle and White House press secretary Pierre Salinger had been classmates at the University of San Francisco, so Rozelle consulted with him. Salinger urged Rozelle to play the games, so he agreed for the schedule to proceed. Rozelle felt that way, saying: "It has been traditional in sports for athletes to perform in times of great personal tragedy. Football was Mr. Kennedy's game. He thrived on competition." After their win over the Philadelphia Eagles in Philadelphia, players on the Washington Redskins asked Coach Bill McPeak to send the game ball to the White House, thanking Rozelle for allowing the games to be played that weekend, saying that they were "playing...for President Kennedy and in his memory." There were players and news outlets that disagreed with the decision, and Rozelle subsequently thought it might have been wiser to cancel those games. The American Football League (AFL) and most major colleges did not play games that weekend.

Citing his "aptitude for conciliation" with the league's owners, his work in expanding the NFL, and his crackdown on player gambling, Sports Illustrated named Rozelle their "Sportsman of the Year" for 1963.

==== The AFL ====
By 1965, the rival American Football League obtained a new NBC-TV contract and had signed a new superstar in Joe Namath. As the leagues battled to sign top talent, bonuses and salaries grew dramatically, especially after a series of "raids" on each other's talent, both signed and unsigned. The leagues agreed to a merger in 1966. Among the conditions were a common draft and a championship game played between the two league champions first played in early 1967, the AFL-NFL World Championship Game, which would eventually become known as the Super Bowl. Rozelle led negotiations with AFL and NFL executives to merge the two leagues. In October 1966, he testified in front of Congress and convinced them to allow the merger. Rozelle played an important role in making the Super Bowl the most watched sporting event in the United States.

Due to television contracts, the AFL and NFL operated as separate leagues until 1970, with separate regular season schedules, but they met in the preseason and in the championship game. Although Rozelle nominally remained the NFL commissioner, he was given broad authority over both leagues after AFL Commissioner Al Davis was forced to resign and ultimately replaced by an AFL President subordinate to the NFL Commissioner. During this time, the NFL Commissioner's office came to resemble that of the Commissioner of Baseball and Rozelle unofficially became known as the Football Commissioner although that was never an official title. Meanwhile, the AFL expanded, adding the Miami Dolphins in 1966, and the Cincinnati Bengals in 1967. Also during this period, the NFL added the Atlanta Falcons in 1966, and the New Orleans Saints in 1967. In 1970, the AFL was absorbed into the NFL and the league reorganized with the ten AFL franchises along with the previous NFL teams Baltimore Colts, Cleveland Browns, and Pittsburgh Steelers becoming part of the newly formed American Football Conference (AFC), with all of the remaining pre-merger NFL teams forming the National Football Conference (NFC). By 1970, the newly reconstituted NFL stood at 26 teams.

=== 1970s ===
In 1970, Rozelle proposed his week-night prime time television concept, Monday Night Football, to Roone Arledge, then the president of ABC Sports. After selling his idea to ABC, Monday Night Football premiered in September 1970 with the Cleveland Browns against the New York Jets; the Browns won the game, 31–21. The program is still broadcast today. Monday Night Football aired on ABC for 36 seasons (1970–2005). Except for the 1998 season in which games aired at 8:20 p.m. Eastern Time, games aired at 9:00 p.m. Eastern Time. The first broadcast announcing team was Don Meredith, Howard Cosell, and Keith Jackson. In 2006, Monday Night Football was moved to ABC's sister network ESPN. The NFL expanded by two more teams in 1976, with the addition of the Tampa Bay Buccaneers and Seattle Seahawks; this brought the league to 28 teams, which would stand as such for the rest of Rozelle's tenure as commissioner.

He enacted in 1963 and was the namesake of the Rozelle rule which required a team signing a free agent to compensate that player's former ballclub with other players and/or draft selections and that he was the lone arbiter in determining the compensation package. Exercised only four times, the rule was declared a violation of antitrust laws by Judge Earl R. Larson in Mackey v. National Football League on December 30, 1975. The plaintiffs had successfully contended that the rule deterred teams from signing free agents out of fear of not knowing the compensation that would have to be surrendered.

=== 1980s ===
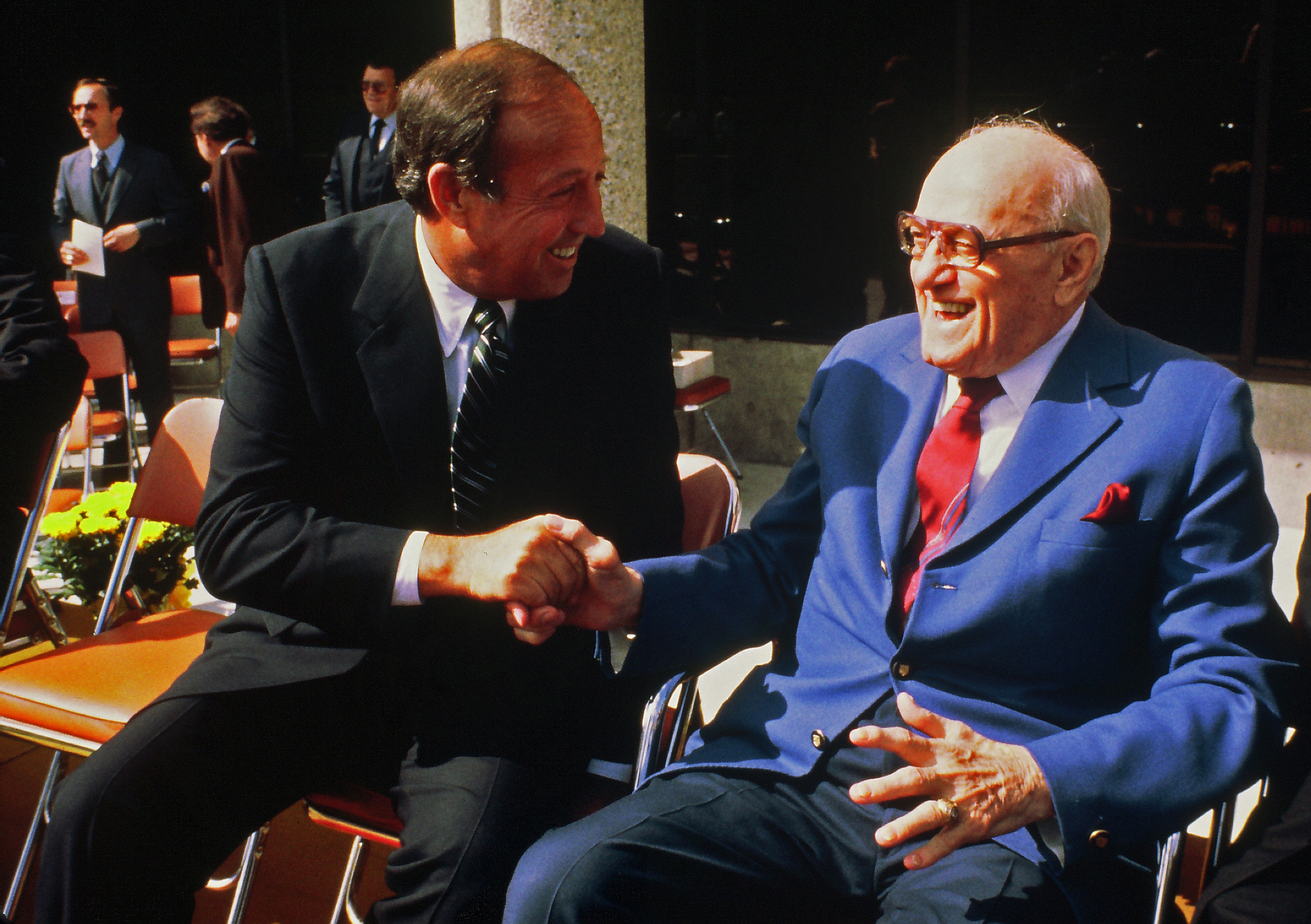
Rozelle (left) with George Halas in the early 1980s

In the 1980s, Al Davis, owner of the Oakland Raiders franchise, sued the NFL in order to relocate the team to Los Angeles. Rozelle represented the NFL, testifying in court to block the Raiders' move. Ultimately, the NFL lost its court case with Davis, and the Oakland franchise moved to Los Angeles in 1982. The tension between Rozelle and Davis, who had wanted to be NFL commissioner, was apparent throughout the case. In January 1981, just after the case was settled, the Oakland Raiders won Super Bowl XV and Rozelle as commissioner was tasked with handing the Super Bowl Trophy to Davis. The Raiders moved back to Oakland in 1995.

=== Influence ===
Under Rozelle the NFL thrived and became an American institution, despite two players' strikes and two different competing leagues. He retired as commissioner on November 5, 1989. By the time of his resignation, the number of teams in the league had grown to 28, and team owners presided over sizable revenues from American broadcasting networks.

Rozelle's legacy of equalization has been felt not only in the NFL, but also in the Australian Football League, the major Australian-rules football competition. In 1986, The AFL Commission adopted a policy of equalization based on the method pioneered by Rozelle in the NFL. It is because of this decision that expansion clubs have been able to survive, as well as older clubs with smaller support bases. An example of this is the 1996 AFL Grand Final between North Melbourne and the Sydney Swans, two teams with small supporter bases.

=== Honors ===
Rozelle was inducted into the Pro Football Hall of Fame in 1985 while still serving as its commissioner. The NFL's annual Pete Rozelle Radio-Television Award was established in 1989 to recognize "longtime exceptional contributions to radio and television in professional football", and is awarded annually by the Pro Football Hall of Fame.

In 1990, the league instituted the Pete Rozelle Trophy to honor the Super Bowl MVP, first awarded in the 1990 season at Super Bowl XXV on January 27, 1991. A month after Rozelle's death in December 1996, the NFL honored his legacy with a decal on the back of the helmets of the teams competing in Super Bowl XXXI.

In 1990, Rozelle received the Golden Plate Award of the American Academy of Achievement. He was honored with the "Lombardi Award of Excellence" from the Vince Lombardi Cancer Foundation in 1991.

For his contribution to sports in Los Angeles, Rozelle was honored by Los Angeles Memorial Coliseum commissioners with a "Court of Honor" plaque at the Coliseum.

== Personal life and death ==
Rozelle married Jane Coupe, an artist, in 1949. The couple had one child, Anne Marie, born in 1958. Rozelle was awarded full custody of Anne Marie after his 1972 divorce due to Coupe's alcoholism. Rozelle remarried in December 1973 to Carrie Cooke, a former daughter-in-law of Jack Kent Cooke, owner of the Washington Redskins.

On December 6, 1996, seven years after his retirement in 1989, Rozelle died of brain cancer at the age of 70 at Rancho Santa Fe, California, and was interred at El Camino Memorial Park in San Diego.

== See also ==
- List of notable brain tumor patients
