= Jerry Wolman =

American developer (1927–2013)

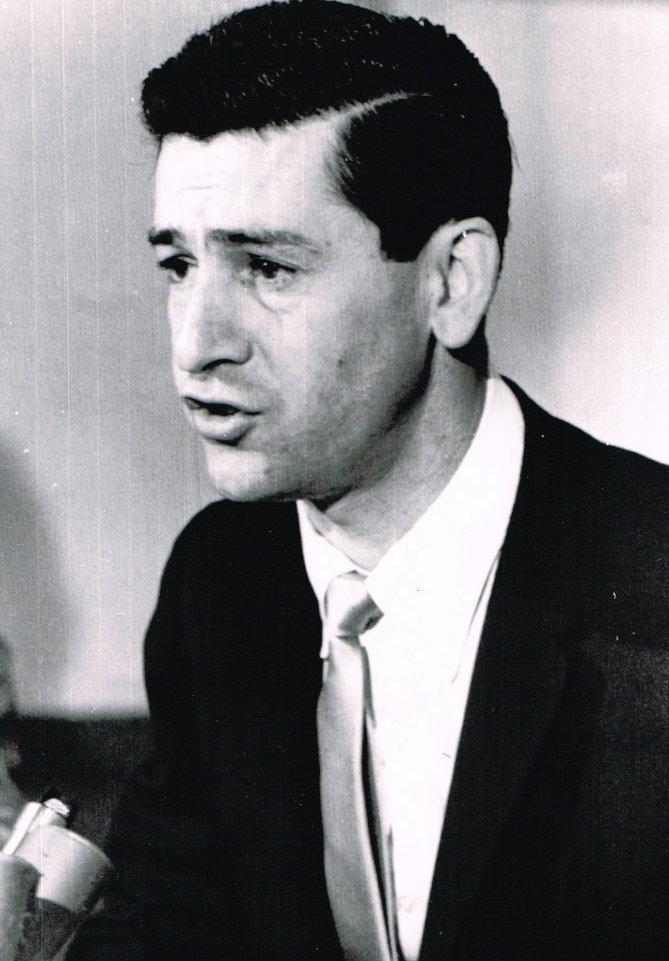
- Wolman in 1965
- Born: Jerry Wolman; February 14, 1927; Shenandoah, Pennsylvania, U.S.
- Died: August 6, 2013 (aged 86); Potomac, Maryland, U.S.
- Resting place: King David Memorial Gardens, Falls Church, Virginia
- Occupations: Property developer Owner, Philadelphia Eagles (NFL), Philadelphia Flyers (NHL)
- Spouse: Bobbie Wolman
- Children: 2

Jerry Wolman (February 14, 1927 – August 6, 2013) was an American developer in Washington, D.C. and owned the Philadelphia Eagles of the National Football League in the 1960s.

== Early years ==
Wolman was born to an Orthodox Jewish family in Shenandoah, Pennsylvania, the son of a grocer. He worked in the family business into his high school years, when his father had a stroke. Not graduating, Wolman joined the Merchant Marine, returned home, and moved to Washington, D.C. In the 1950s, he began his own construction company, building apartment units and offices.

== Sports owner ==
In late 1963, 36-year-old Wolman bought the Eagles franchise for $5,505,000 from the "Happy Hundred," a group of investors that owned the team from 1949–1963, and became the youngest owner in the league. He also owned Connie Mack Stadium in Philadelphia, the ballpark of the Phillies through 1970.

Wolman was also one of the founding owners, briefly in 1967, of the expansion Philadelphia Flyers of the National Hockey League. Over the next two years, his $100-million financial empire crumbled into bankruptcy, and he was forced to give up his interests in both teams. In 1967, he sold his Flyers interest to his co-owners, with Ed Snider assuming control, along with his partners, Bill Putnam and Joe Scott. In 1969, he sold the Eagles to Leonard Tose for a reported $16.1 million, then a record price for a professional sports team.

Wolman was a member of the Pennsylvania Sports Hall of Fame; one of its chapters is named after him. Wolman was a philanthropic individual who never forgot his coal mining town roots. He kept in contact with his Pennsylvania hometown of Shenandoah through good and bad times.

Wolman also initiated the development of the John Hancock Center, a 100-story skyscraper in Chicago, Illinois.

== Personal ==
Wolman lived in the Washington suburb of Potomac, Maryland, with his wife, Bobbie. A father of two and a grandfather of eight, he died at age 86 on August 6, 2013.
