= Alexis Thompson =

American football owner

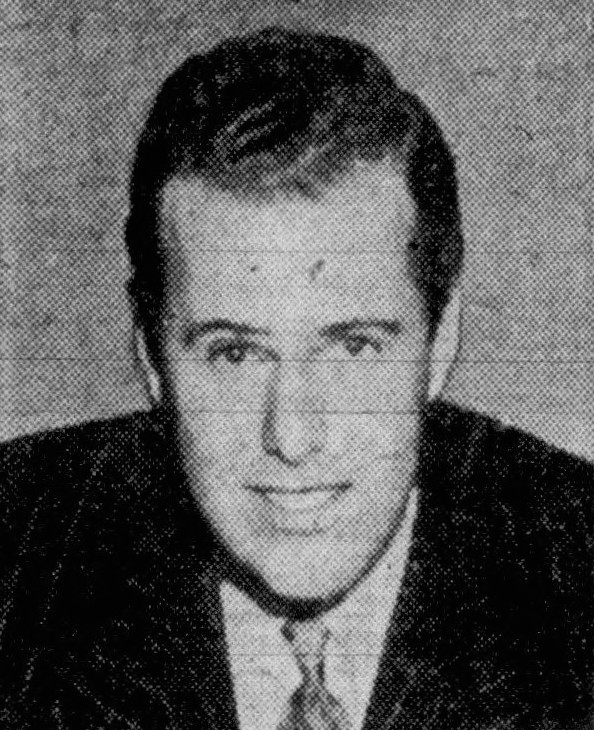
Thompson, circa 1942

Alexis Thompson (May 20, 1911 – December 20, 1954) was the owner of the National Football League (NFL)'s Philadelphia Eagles, Pittsburgh Steelers, and Philadelphia-Pittsburgh Steagles. Before his executive career, he was a field hockey player who competed in the 1936 Summer Olympics for the United States team, which was eliminated in the group stage of the Olympic tournament. He played one match as a forward.

Thompson was born in Chicago, Illinois. A graduate of Yale University, he was the grandson of the founder of Republic Iron and Steel, also named Alexis Thompson, and the son of David Thompson. When David died in March 1929, the younger Alexis inherited $6 million. A U.S. Army corporal, Thompson was an entrepreneur who made millions more selling eye care products.

In December 1940, Steelers owner Art Rooney sold the Steelers franchise (including the players) to 28-year-old Thompson for $160,000, and then used half of that to buy a half-interest in the Eagles franchise from his friend Bert Bell. Thompson changed the team's name to the Iron Men. After having second thoughts, the owners traded their cities back to each other before the start of the 1941 season, so that the Steelers franchise moved to Philadelphia and became the Philadelphia Eagles, and the Eagles franchise moved to Pittsburgh and became the Pittsburgh Steelers. As part of the deal, part of the series of franchise transactions that was known as the Pennsylvania Polka, eleven members of the 1940 Steelers were traded to the Eagles franchise (and thereby continued to play in Pittsburgh), while seventeen of the 1940 Eagles were traded to the Steelers franchise (and thereby continued to play in Philadelphia).

In late 1941, Thompson organized a professional head-to-head tennis tour of North America with a troupe of players including Don Budge, Fred Perry, Bobby Riggs, and Frank Kovacs, which lasted 71 stops until it was disbanded in April 1942.

In the hospital for appendicitis while the Eagles won their first NFL title in a snowstorm in 1948, Thompson sold the franchise a few weeks later to a group of investors known as the "Happy Hundred" for $250,000 on January 15, 1949.

Thompson's body was discovered on December 20, 1954, in his six-room apartment in Englewood, New Jersey. He died at age 43 of an apparent heart attack.

== Bibliography ==
- Ruck, Rob; Patterson, Maggie Jones; Weber, Michael P. (2010). Rooney: A Sporting Life. Lincoln, Neb.: University of Nebraska Press. ISBN 978-0-8032-2283-0.
