= Flood v. Kuhn =

1972 U.S. Supreme Court decision on baseball antitrust exemption

- Supreme Court of the United States

Argued March 20, 1972 Decided June 19, 1972
- Full case name: Curt Flood v. Bowie Kuhn, et al.
- Citations: 407 U.S. 258 (more) 92 S. Ct. 2099; 32 L. Ed. 2d 728; 1972 U.S. LEXIS 138

Case history
- Prior: Preliminary injunction denied, 309 F. Supp. 793 (S.D.N.Y. 1970); 316 F. Supp. 271 (S.D.N.Y. 1970); affirmed, 443 F.2d 264 (2d Cir. 1971); cert. granted, 404 U.S. 880 (1971).

Holding
- Professional baseball is in fact interstate commerce under the Sherman Antitrust Act, but congressional acquiescence in previous jurisprudence to the contrary make it the legislative branch's responsibility to end or modify antitrust exemption unique among professional sports. Second Circuit affirmed.

Court membership
- Chief Justice Warren E. Burger Associate Justices William O. Douglas · William J. Brennan Jr. Potter Stewart · Byron White; Thurgood Marshall · Harry Blackmun; Lewis F. Powell Jr. · William Rehnquist

Case opinions
- Majority: Blackmun, joined by Stewart, Rehnquist (in full); Burger, White (all but part I)
- Concurrence: Burger
- Dissent: Douglas, joined by Brennan
- Dissent: Marshall, joined by Brennan
- Powell took no part in the consideration or decision of the case.

Laws applied
- Sherman Antitrust Act, 15 U.S.C. §§ 1291–1295

Flood v. Kuhn, 407 U.S. 258 (1972), was a decision by the Supreme Court of the United States that preserved the reserve clause in Major League Baseball (MLB) players' contracts. By a 5–3 margin, the Court reaffirmed the antitrust exemption that had been granted to professional baseball in 1922 under Federal Baseball Club v. National League, and previously affirmed by Toolson v. New York Yankees, Inc. in 1953. While the majority believed that baseball's antitrust exemption was anomalous compared to other professional sports, it held that any changes to the exemption should be made through Congress and not the courts.

The National League had instituted the reserve clause in 1879 as a means of limiting salaries by keeping players under team control. Under that system, a baseball team reserved players under contract for a year after the contract expired, preventing them from being taken by other teams in bidding wars. MLB team owners argued that the clause was necessary to ensure a competitive balance among teams, as otherwise wealthier clubs would outbid teams in smaller markets for star players. The reserve clause was not addressed in Federal Baseball, where Ned Hanlon, owner of the rival Federal League's (FL) Baltimore Terrapins, had argued that MLB had violated the Sherman Antitrust Act through anticompetitive practices meant to force the FL out of business. The Supreme Court ruled that baseball did not qualify as interstate commerce for the purposes of the Sherman Act, a ruling that remained even after it denied boxing and American football the same exemption.

In 1969, Curt Flood, a center fielder for the St. Louis Cardinals, was traded to the Philadelphia Phillies. Flood was unhappy with the trade, as the Phillies were not known to treat players well, but the reserve clause required him to play for Philadelphia. He retained attorney Arthur Goldberg, a former Supreme Court justice, through Marvin Miller and the Major League Baseball Players Association (MLBPA) and took the case to court, arguing that the reserve clause was a collusive measure that reduced competition and thus an antitrust violation. The reserve system was upheld by all three courts under the principle of stare decisis and the precedents set by Federal Baseball and Toolson.

Legal scholars have criticized the Court's decision in Flood both for its rigid application of stare decisis as well as Section I of Harry Blackmun's majority opinion, an "ode to baseball" that contains little legal matter. The reserve clause was settled outside the Supreme Court three years later through the arbitration system created by the collective bargaining agreement between MLB and the MLBPA. Peter Seitz ruled in favor of Andy Messersmith and Dave McNally that their contracts could only be renewed without their permission for one season, after which they became free agents. Free agency in MLB was codified the following year after the 1976 Major League Baseball lockout, while the Curt Flood Act of 1998, signed by Bill Clinton, ended baseball's antitrust exemption as it related to interactions between players and owners, but preserved it in other areas such as franchise relocation. Courts have continued to differ over the extent of the exemption; a 2021 suit filed over that year's minor league reorganization asks that it be rescinded entirely.

== Background ==
=== Reserve clause ===
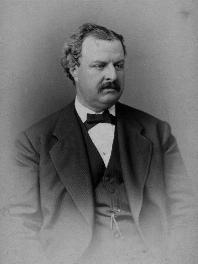
William Hulbert instituted the reserve system in the National League in 1879.

William Hulbert, then the president of the National League (NL), instituted the first reserve clause in professional baseball in 1879. Under Hulbert's system, each NL team could "reserve" five players for its roster, and owners from opposing clubs could not offer contracts to reserved players. This provision extended to 11 players per team in 1883, 12 per team in 1885, 14 per team in 1887, and by 1890, all players under active contract with an NL team were subject to the reserve clause. Any player who signed with an NL team was placed under that team's control until they retired, were traded to another club, or were released outright. This latter qualification also made it easier for teams to discipline players by voiding their contracts, and it was sometimes referred to as the "reserve and release" clause. In 1883, the American Association entered into the first national agreement with the NL, extending the reserve system to the Association as well. In 1903, the American League (AL) signed its own national agreement, forming the two-league system known as Major League Baseball (MLB). The reserve clause extended cross-league, with reserved NL players prevented from joining AL teams and vice versa.

The primary rationale for instituting the reserve clause was to limit player salaries for the struggling NL by keeping players under team control. Many of the players that the owners reserved for the 1880 season had been, at the time, the best-paid in the league, such as Cap Anson, Paul Hines, and Tommy Bond, and these players saw their salaries drop once they remained bound to their respective teams. Once the reserve system was extended to all players, those players were categorized into five categories under the Brush Classification System, with each group receiving a salary that ranged between $1,500 and $2,500 annually. While the league owners supported the reserve system as a cost-cutting measure, they also defended its use as a way to ensure a competitive balance in baseball. Without a reserve clause, the wealthiest teams could stockpile star players simply by outbidding smaller teams. This sentiment was echoed by federal district court judge William P. Wallace in 1890, who quoted Albert Spalding in arguing that the rule "takes a manager by the throat and compels him to keep his hands off his neighbor's enterprise". The owners also argued that the reserve clause justified a team's investment in its players, who were drafted with little experience and required years of development to reach the major leagues.

One of the first players to challenge the reserve clause was Sam Wise, who in 1882 left the Cincinnati Red Stockings of the American Association for the NL's Boston Red Caps. The Massachusetts General Court denied Cincinnati's request for an injunction, and Wise spent the remainder of the season with Boston. The reserve clause's most vocal opponent, however, was John Montgomery Ward, known as Monte Ward, who compared the system to slavery in 1885. In 1890, he helped to found the Players' League (PL), which promised a three-year contract to all players and no pay cuts after the first year. Players' salaries were the same as what the NL had paid them in either 1888 or 1889, whichever was higher. Players who had joined the PL, like Jim O'Rourke, were able to convince their colleagues that the reserve clause only prevented players from joining teams in those leagues that had it, and that they were legally free to join teams in new leagues.

When Ward left the New York Giants to join the PL, the team took him to New York Supreme Court (Note: Not New York's highest court, which is the New York Court of Appeals) to prevent him from playing with his new club. While Justice Morgan J. O'Brien disagreed with Ward and O'Rourke's assessment that the reserve clause did not apply to the Players' League, the court was most concerned about the vague phrasing of the clause: Ward was technically under contract with the Giants for the 1890 season, but the perpetual reserve clause meant that major aspects of his contract, including his salary, were not addressed, and the court decided that the reserve clause was "too indefinite" to be properly enforced. The decision in Metropolitan Exhibition Co. v. Ward also criticized the uneven system by which a team could hold a player theoretically indefinitely but terminate them with only 10 days' notice. This legal victory was not enough to sustain the Players' League, as many of its financial backers pulled out after suffering considerable losses during that premiere season.

Hall of Famer Nap Lajoie was taken to court in 1901 by the Philadelphia Phillies, an NL team, after he joined their crosstown AL rival, the Philadelphia Athletics, who were not yet bound by the reserve clause. The Supreme Court of Pennsylvania ruled the next year in Philadelphia Ball Club, Ltd. v. Lajoie that he possessed a unique skill set, much like Johanna Wagner, the defendant in the seminal 1852 English contract law decision Lumley v Wagner. This skill set meant that, while the Phillies could not require Lajoie to play for them, they could prevent him from playing for other teams.

=== Baseball's antitrust exemption ===
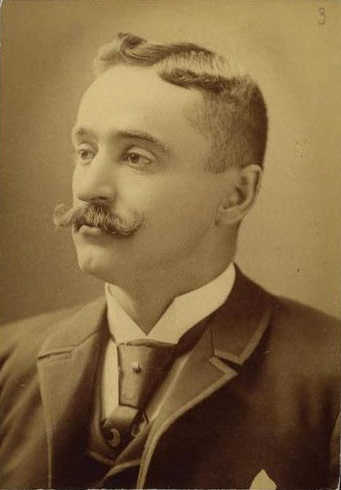
Ned Hanlon took MLB to court for antitrust violations in Federal Baseball Club v. National League.

The United States Congress had enacted the Sherman Antitrust Act which prohibited the type of anticompetitive collusion under which the reserve clause has been argued to fall, in 1890. This policy was extended even further by the Clayton Antitrust Act of 1914, which allowed private parties to sue for damages caused by anticompetitive conduct. The same year that the Clayton Act became law, the Federal League (FL) was created as a challenger to MLB. Despite the new league prohibiting players from signing if they were under contract with a major league team and MLB threatening to blacklist players who defected, players such as Joe Tinker nonetheless left MLB to join the FL, and many of these defections led to litigation. While the lower courts typically ruled in favor of players who joined the Federal League during the offseason, when they were under reserve but not an active contract, the owners did win some cases where players had abandoned their MLB team midseason.

Dave Fultz, the president of the FL, was primarily focused on improving the working conditions of minor league players and improving player safety. He was not radically against the reserve system, and he feared that eliminating it from his league would incur retribution from MLB. Instead, he proposed that FL players remained under reserve for five years, after which owners and players could mutually agree to extend the reserve option.

==== Federal Baseball Club of Baltimore v. National League ====
In January 1915, the Federal League owners sued the major leagues and three members of the National Commission for antitrust violations, hoping that noted trustbuster Kenesaw Mountain Landis would rule in their favor. Landis, however, announced that "any blows at the thing called baseball would be regarded by this court as a blow to a national institution", and he took the case under advisement for a year to stall any action. Meanwhile, the FL incurred great financial losses that season, and came to a settlement with MLB at the end of the year.

Most FL owners were bought out by MLB teams or allowed to buy interests in existing major league clubs. The one exception was Ned Hanlon of the Baltimore Terrapins. Hanlon and his partners brought an antitrust lawsuit in D.C. District Court, alleging that MLB had colluded to "wreck and destroy" the FL by purchasing and dissolving its teams. Judge Wendell Phillips Stafford ruled in Hanlon's favor, agreeing that baseball games constituted interstate trade and commerce under the Sherman Act and that MLB had engaged in impermissibly monopolistic behavior. Hanlon was awarded $80,000 in damages, which was increased to $240,000 ($7.64 million in modern dollars) under the treble-damages provision of the Clayton Act.

On appeal, Judge George W. Pepper of the D.C. Circuit held that sports like baseball, "a spontaneous product of human activity", were "not in [their] nature commerce", and thus not subject to antitrust legislation. The circuit's chief judge, Constantine Joseph Smyth, wrote in his opinion that "sport" such as professional baseball fell outside the realm of business and thus monopoly. Hanlon then brought his claim to the Supreme Court, where former US president and baseball fan William Howard Taft was Chief Justice.

In May 1922, the Court unanimously affirmed the appellate decision in Federal Baseball Club v. National League. The Sherman Act required that businesses be engaged in interstate commerce to incur government intervention, and Justice Oliver Wendell Holmes Jr. interpreted commerce to include only physical goods. Because baseball exhibitions did not fall under this definition, the sport consisted of "purely state affairs". (Note: Although the decision did not explicitly exempt baseball from antitrust regulation, saying only that its nature did not fall under the Sherman Act, Federal Baseball has become known as "baseball's antitrust exemption". The understanding that baseball was exempt from the antitrust laws regarding other sports did not come into effect until the 1950s, when sports such as boxing and football lost cases that would have given them the same protections.)

The next term the Court considered Hart v. B.F. Keith Vaudeville Exchange, a Clayton Act suit brought by a talent agent alleging the defendants had conspired to exclude the plaintiffs' clients from the many theaters they controlled in order to extract large payments to them, arguing that since their productions depended on the interstate transport of sets and costumes, the vaudeville circuit was interestate commerce. It had been filed before Federal Baseball; afterwards, the defendants had argued that their industry, too, was similarly not interstate commerce since its main business activity was selling admission to performances it had arranged rather than transport of goods for sale, with the shipments of materials required for those productions merely an incident to their business, just as with baseball teams' travel. The Southern District of New York agreed and dismissed the case. Justice Holmes wrote for a unanimous Court that reversed the trial court on jurisdictional grounds, holding that a federal question existed over whether the vaudeville circuit was interstate commerce, and that until that question was resolved the case was not to be disposed even if the arguments for federal jurisdiction themselves seemed weak. "[I]t may be that what in general is incidental, in some instances may rise to a magnitude that requires it to be considered independently", Holmes wrote.

==== Gardella v. Chandler ====
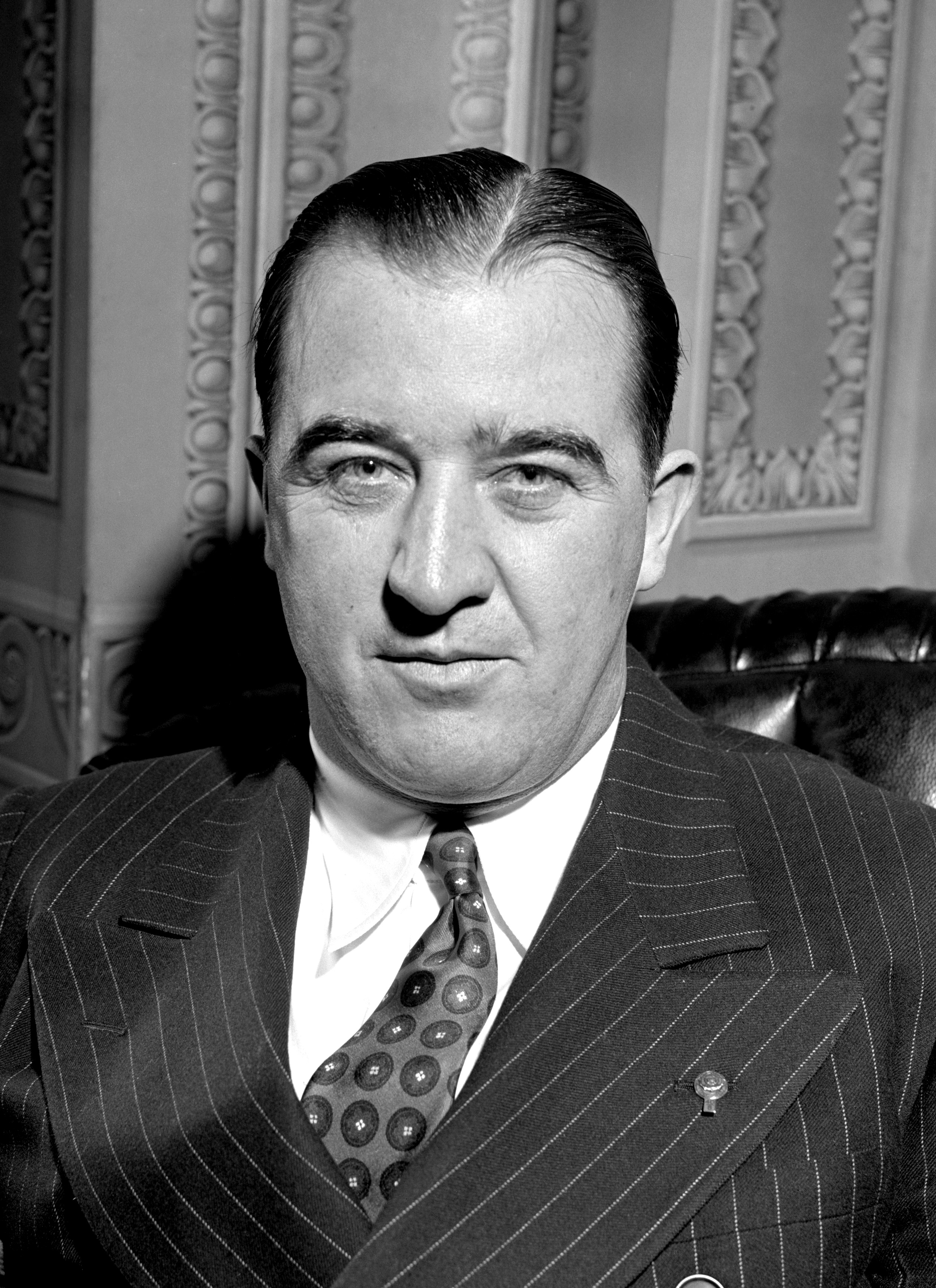
Happy Chandler was the Commissioner of Baseball when Danny Gardella almost overturned baseball's antitrust exemption.

The case that came closest to overturning the reserve system and antitrust exemption was brought by Danny Gardella, who left the New York Giants in 1946 to play for the Azules de Veracruz of the Mexican League. He returned to New York in 1947 to play in MLB again but found himself blacklisted. Gardella's attorney Frederic Johnson tried to distinguish his client from Nap Lajoie by arguing his client was not an exceptional player or "unique performer", but a standard-quality professional athlete being denied an opportunity to make a living.

Judge Henry W. Goddard of the Southern District of New York (Note: Hereafter referred to in this article as just the Southern District. Many cases involving MLB have been filed here since the organization is headquartered in Manhattan.) ruled in favor of the owners, dismissing Gardella's lawsuit under the precedent set by Federal Baseball, The United States Court of Appeals for the Second Circuit overturned this decision, however, with Jerome Frank ruling that baseball's television and radio presence made it a matter of interstate commerce that thus fell under the Sherman Act. The case never reached the Supreme Court, as Happy Chandler, then the Commissioner of Baseball, soon reinstated the blacklisted Mexican League players. Gardella settled out of court for $60,000 in damages and a trade to the St. Louis Cardinals.

With Gardella's case settled, there was little pressure on the league to alter the reserve system or any other anticompetitive measures. Some members of Congress, however, were worried about the potential challenge to baseball's antitrust exemption, as well as the instability to the sport caused when Chandler was replaced by Ford Frick. In 1951, four bills were introduced to Congress that would have further codified the antitrust laws concerning baseball. (Note: The Court's 1944 decision in United States v. South-Eastern Underwriters Ass'n reversing 75 years of regularly reaffirmed precedent that had held the insurance business and thus any industry that did business mainly by negotiating contracts with clients was not interstate commerce, thus putting it within the ambit of the Sherman and Clayton Acts, led to some reconsideration of whether baseball's antitrust exemption would survive renewed scrutiny, since not only did its interstate aspect in part depend on contracts, its exemption had stood for less time and Congressional debates about the Sherman Act had not discussed insurance much and baseball not at all. John Neville, an attorney with the Department of Justice's antitrust division, speculated in 1947 that if the opportunity presented itself, four of the sitting justices at the time would probably vote to overrule Federal Baseball, with two likely opposed, and the three judges who had joined the Court since South-Eastern the unknowns. "The Federal Baseball case is a decision on baseball of another age", he concluded. "It antedates the era of nationally sponsored coast to coast broadcasts, television, million dollar gate receipts, and $80,000 salaries. It represents the legalistic approach rather than the realistic appreciation that organized baseball is a business and not merely a spectacle.")

==== Toolson v. New York Yankees, Inc. ====
Congress ultimately took no action on the antitrust exemption, as the House Subcommittee on the Study of Monopoly Power decided that enacting official legislation would affect the Supreme Court's decision on another case that had come its way, Toolson v. New York Yankees, Inc. George Toolson, a minor league player in the Yankees' farm system, had been reassigned from the Newark Bears, their Triple-A affiliate, to the Low-A Binghamton Triplets in 1949. He refused to report to the new club and brought the reserve clause to court as an antitrust violation. In a 7–2 ruling, the Court upheld the Federal Baseball precedent that the "business of giving exhibitions" was "purely state affairs" and thus exempt from the antitrust protections built into the Sherman Act. The one-paragraph per curiam majority opinion in Toolson held that any changes to the Federal Baseball precedent would have to go through Congress and not the courts. Justice Harold Hitz Burton dissented, arguing that organized baseball was obviously engaged in interstate trade and commerce and thus should be subject to federal antitrust enforcement.

==== Shuster and International Boxing ====
The Court did not revisit baseball's antitrust exemption, although other lower courts would. In the years after Toolson, three other antitrust cases involving other industries, including other professional sports, made baseball's exemption problematic when the Court declined to extend the logic of Federal Baseball to them.

Early in 1955, two cases decided the same day involved federal Sherman Act cases against companies alleged to have nearly monopolized theatrical performances and professional boxing. Both defendants had argued that the Federal Baseball precedent applied to them as well since the interstate travel required to stage performances and fights was equally incidental to those events, and judges in the Southern District of New York hearing the cases granted defense motions to dismiss. The government appealed directly to the Supreme Court under the Expediting Act.

In both cases, the Court allowed the cases to proceed. The theater case, United States v. Shuster, was decided unanimously. After citing many precedents which had held industries which did not ship goods for sale across state lines to be interstate commerce, Chief Justice Earl Warren wrote that Federal Baseball and Toolson applied only to baseball and thus Hart controlled in the instant case: "[It] established, contrary to the defendants' argument here, that Federal Baseball did not automatically immunize the theatrical business from the antitrust laws." Any holding that it did required a trial on that question. Justices Burton and Reed referred to their Toolson dissents in statements indicating their concurrence with Warren's opinion.

The two would also join Warren's majority opinion in United States v. International Boxing Club of New York, Inc., where he conceded that "if it were not for Federal Baseball and Toolson, we think that it would be too clear for dispute that the Government's allegations bring the defendants within the scope of the Act." Again he deferred to Congress to resolve the issue if it desired. Justices Felix Frankfurter and Sherman Minton dissented this time, with Minton also joining Frankfurter's dissent.

"It would baffle the subtlest ingenuity to find a single differentiating factor between other sporting exhibitions, whether boxing or football or tennis, and baseball insofar as the conduct of the sport is relevant to the criteria or considerations by which the Sherman Law becomes applicable to a 'trade or commerce'", Frankfurter wrote. "It can hardly be that this Court gave a preferred position to baseball because it is the great American sport. I do not suppose that the Court would treat the national anthem differently from other songs if the nature of a song became relevant to adjudication."

Minton, conversely, believed that the Court should have held boxing equally beyond the reach of antitrust law. Accusing the majority of having misread Toolson, he wrote:

When boxers travel from State to State, carrying their shorts and fancy dressing robes in a ditty bag in order to participate in a boxing bout, which is wholly intrastate, it is now held by this Court that the boxing bout becomes interstate commerce. What this Court held in the Federal Baseball case to be incident to the exhibition now becomes more important than the exhibition. This is as fine an example of the tail wagging the dog as can be conjured up.

==== Radovich v. National Football League ====
Two years later, the Court heard Radovich v. National Football League (NFL), in which another player, like Gardella, who believed himself to have been blacklisted from the major league in his sport due to his decision to play in a team in the competing All-America Football Conference (AAFC), had brought suit. The NFL asserted at trial that baseball's antitrust exemption applied equally to it, and the district judge dismissed the case on those grounds. (Note: But see United States v. National Football League, 116 F.Supp. 319 (E.D.Pa. 1953), where Judge Allan Kuhn Grim held that certain of the NFL's restrictions on its member clubs' radio and television broadcasting contracts such as those allowing clubs to prevent the broadcast of games played elsewhere in the league in their home market and (where applicable) a 75-mile (121 km) radius when they themselves are playing away games during the same time period, and allowing the league's commissioner final authority over any broadcast, were violative of the Sherman Act. While Grim recognized the league's interest in, like baseball, limiting competition for players to offset the economic strength of teams in larger markets and thus provide competitive games for fans, (at 324), he held that this interest did not justify all restrictions on broadcasting since radio and television had already been held to constitute interstate commerce under the Act (327). Grim thus distinguished the instant case from Federal Baseball and Toolson by noting that those cases concerned only MLB's internal operations and not any business exterior to it. "It is obvious that whether professional football itself is or is not engaged in interstate commerce is immaterial in the present case and that the decisions in the baseball cases referred to do not control the present case." (328). In footnote 6 to Grim's opinion, he discussed the possible methods of preserving the league's competitive balance by limiting competition for players, such as a draft and/or salary cap. While he reserved judgement on whether it might be acceptable in football, given the league's less extensive history than MLB, and that it had only recently emerged victorious from its struggle with the AAFC that would later be at issue in Radovich, he unequivocally believed baseball should strongly consider such measures:(324n6) The professional baseball team which has the only American League franchise in the New York area, the New York Yankees, has dominated professional baseball so much in the last thirty years that most of the other teams no longer have any real hope of winning a championship. This is harmful to professional baseball generally. Certainly it is not merely a coincidence that the professional baseball team which draws from a population area twice as large as its nearest competitor wins almost all the championships. At the time, the Yankees had appeared in 16 of the last 30 World Series and won 14 of them, the bulk in two runs: four straight championships in the late 1930s and a run of five, previously unequaled in any other major American team professional sport, that had just ended a month before Grim's decision. Congress eventually passed the Sports Broadcasting Act of 1961, allowing not just football but all televised professional team sports to pool their broadcast rights in a manner Grim had found unlawful.) At appeal, Radovich argued that International Boxing had held otherwise, but the Ninth Circuit distinguished boxing by noting that football, like baseball, was a team sport where "very good arguments do exist for the indulgence of restraints on individual players."

The Court reversed. After reiterating Shuster's holding that Toolson was limited to baseball and did not automatically extend to any other business despite any apparent similarities, Justice Tom C. Clark wrote for a majority of six that "the volume of interstate business involved in organized professional football places it within the provisions of the Act". He admitted that "were we considering the question of baseball for the first time upon a clean slate, we would have no doubts."

Frankfurter again dissented. "[T]he most conscientious probing of the text and the interstices of the Sherman Law fails to disclose that Congress, whose will we are enforcing, excluded baseball—the conditions under which that sport is carried on—from the scope of the Sherman Law, but included football", he wrote. Newer justices John Marshall Harlan II and William J. Brennan Jr., who had replaced Minton, also dissented. "What was foreshadowed by International Boxing has now come to pass", Harlan lamented. "The Court, in holding that professional football is subject to the antitrust laws, now says in effect that professional baseball is sui generis so far as those laws are concerned."

==== State v. Milwaukee Braves ====
Within a decade, a case would be brought alleging MLB came under state antitrust laws when Wisconsin sought to block the Braves' move from Milwaukee to Atlanta. The state alleged that baseball had exercised its monopoly power in an unreasonable way that had a substantially negative effect on business within the state, and sought to either have the move prevented or an expansion team be located in Milwaukee. A lower court agreed, and granted an injunction that delayed the Braves' move until their appeal, arguing that federal preemption and the Dormant Commerce Clause put baseball out of reach of Wisconsin's antitrust laws, could be heard by the state's Supreme Court.

A narrowly divided court lifted the injunction. After reviewing the Supreme Court's precedents at length, Justice Thomas E. Fairchild wrote for the four-justice majority that while baseball's antitrust exemption might not cover all the businesses a baseball team could and did engage in, "it does seem clear that the exemption at least covers the agreements and rules which provide for the structure of the organization and the decisions which are necessary steps in maintaining it." Since Congress had not explicitly barred the states from regulating baseball, "the ultimate question is whether the state action conflicts with national policy", Fairchild concluded, noting that either preventing the Braves' move or requiring MLB to locate an expansion team in Wisconsin would have nationwide implications, particularly if other states similarly brought their laws to bear.

The majority, Fairchild said, either found it "unrealistic to interpret these decisions of the supreme court of the United States plus the silence of Congress as creating a mere vacuum in national policy, leaving the states free to regulate the membership of the baseball leagues" or followed Toolson in deferring to the reliance interests the federal antitrust exemption had established and Congress's sole power to change that. It did, however, note in its conclusion that "[t]he record strongly suggests that the defendants gave little heed to the interests of the Milwaukee community, and to the injury which the move would cause", expressing a wish for Congress to deal with the issue.

Justice Nathan Heffernan, writing for the three dissenters, castigated the majority for ignoring well-established Supreme Court precedent that Congressional inaction is never to be taken as proscribing state action without an express provision to that effect. (Note: H.P. Welch, Inc. v. New Hampshire, 306 U.S. 79, 85 (1939), quoting Illinois Central Railway Co. v. State Public Utilities Commission, 245 U.S. 493, 510 (1918) ("In construing federal statutes enacted under the power conferred by the commerce clause of the Constitution the rule is that it should never be held that Congress intends to supersede or suspend the exercise of the reserved powers of a State, even where that may be done, unless, and except so far as, its purpose to do so is clearly manifested.").) "Can we conclude that congressional silence amounts to a manifestation that it is the national policy and the congressional will that baseball be free of all regulation? We think not", he wrote. "The most that possibly can be concluded from the failure of Congress to enact some regulation of baseball is that it reveals a congressional complacency with its own policy of nonaction and inertia." The majority had similarly disregarded a recent reiteration of an older admonition from the Supreme Court not to infer federal intent to pre-empt the states merely from congressional inaction, Heffernan added. (Note: Huron Portland Cement Co. v. City of Detroit, 362 U.S. 440, 443 (1960), quoting Savage v. Jones, 225 U.S. 501, 533 (1912) ("[T]he intent to supersede the exercise by the State of its police power as to matters not covered by the Federal legislation is not to be inferred from the mere fact that Congress has seen fit to circumscribe its regulation and to occupy a limited field. In other words, such intent is not to be implied unless the act of Congress fairly interpreted is in actual conflict with the law of the State.").)

To the dissenters, the other majority theory, that the reliance interests nationally precluded any exercise of state authority, was at odds with another Supreme Court precedent, California v. Thompson. Recalling "the cavalier disregard of either law or reasonableness in the exercise of the baseball monopoly" (Note: "The record, as the majority indicates, strongly suggests that the defendant gave little heed to the Milwaukee community and to the injury which the move of the Braves out of Wisconsin would cause ... It is not contradicted that as a result of the Braves' presence in Wisconsin, transportation facilities were expanded, municipal services were augmented, and industries of various types were created or expanded to support organized baseball in Milwaukee. The record shows, and the findings of the court are not disputed by the majority, that the National League baseball team was a profitable enterprise during the time that it was located in Wisconsin ... The record shows that the Braves organization is no innocent that has unexpectedly run afoul of an unreasonable state's efforts to preserve its share of a monopoly. The record is rife with evidence that the corporation acted surreptitiously and deceitfully in an effort to prevent a timely exercise of Wisconsin's jurisdiction. The officers of the club represented that no change in location was contemplated when, in fact, the negotiations for that change were substantially complete. The contract with Atlanta contained an exculpatory clause allowing the team to terminate its contract with Atlanta if litigation should force it to remain in Milwaukee. It is apparent that the baseball club contemplated the likelihood of being called to task for its conduct.") that the majority had itself taken note of, "[w]e cannot conclude that the state is less able to resist this treatment of its legitimate interests by organized baseball than it is to prevent the entrance into its boundaries of contagious disease, although such disease is carried in interstate commerce", Heffernan wrote. "It is difficult to see what national interest is preserved by immunizing this organization from the consequences of its violation of state law."

==== Salerno v. American League ====
In 1970, the Second Circuit affirmed the dismissal of Salerno v. American League, a case brought by two umpires who contended that their terminations for incompetence actually resulted from their attempts to organize their colleagues, held that their antitrust claims were largely irrelevant to a case they had failed to make even if baseball were not exempt. But on that matter, Judge Henry Friendly wrote for the court, "[t]he ground upon which Toolson rested was that Congress had no intention to bring baseball within the antitrust laws, not that baseball's activities did not sufficiently affect interstate commerce. We freely acknowledge our belief that Federal Baseball was not one of Mr. Justice Holmes' happiest days, that the rationale of Toolson is extremely dubious and that, to use the Supreme Court's own adjectives, the distinction between baseball and other professional sports is 'unrealistic,' 'inconsistent' and 'illogical'". But it remained the Supreme Court's prerogative to overrule those cases, and "[w]hile we should not fall out of our chairs with surprise at the news that [they have] been overruled, we are not at all certain the Court is ready to give them a happy despatch."

==== Spencer Haywood cases ====
After leading the U.S. team to a gold medal at the 1968 Olympics, 19-year-old Spencer Haywood sought to play professionally but was stymied by a National Basketball Association (NBA) rule that players were not eligible to be drafted until four years after their high school class had graduated. He chose to instead play for the rival American Basketball Association's (ABA) Denver Rockets for two seasons, then attempted to switch to the NBA with the Seattle SuperSonics for the 1970–71 season when he was dissatisfied with the Rockets' latest salary offer. The league fined Sonics owner Sam Schulman; individual teams formally protested the result of every game Haywood played in regardless of the outcome. Haywood filed suit, seeking an injunction against the NBA on the grounds that its actions were a group boycott illegal under antitrust law.

The case came before Justice Douglas for an expedited appeal after the Ninth Circuit stayed the injunction pendente lite Haywood had won in the Central District of California, in order to allow him to take the floor for the Sonics in the impending playoffs. "The college player draft binds the player to the team selected", Douglas conceded. "Basketball, however, does not enjoy exemption from the antitrust laws. Thus, the decision in this suit would be similar to the one on baseball's reserve clause which our decisions exempting baseball from the antitrust laws have foreclosed." He said the group boycott issue was "significant" in professional sports.

The full Court, en banc, declined to reverse Douglas. On remand, District Judge Warren J. Ferguson took note and held the NBA subject to the Sherman Act. "[B]y pooling their economic power, the individual members of the NBA have, in effect, established their own private government", he wrote, permanently enjoining the league from enforcing the four-year rule and sanctions against Haywood, Schulman and the Sonics.

=== Curt Flood ===
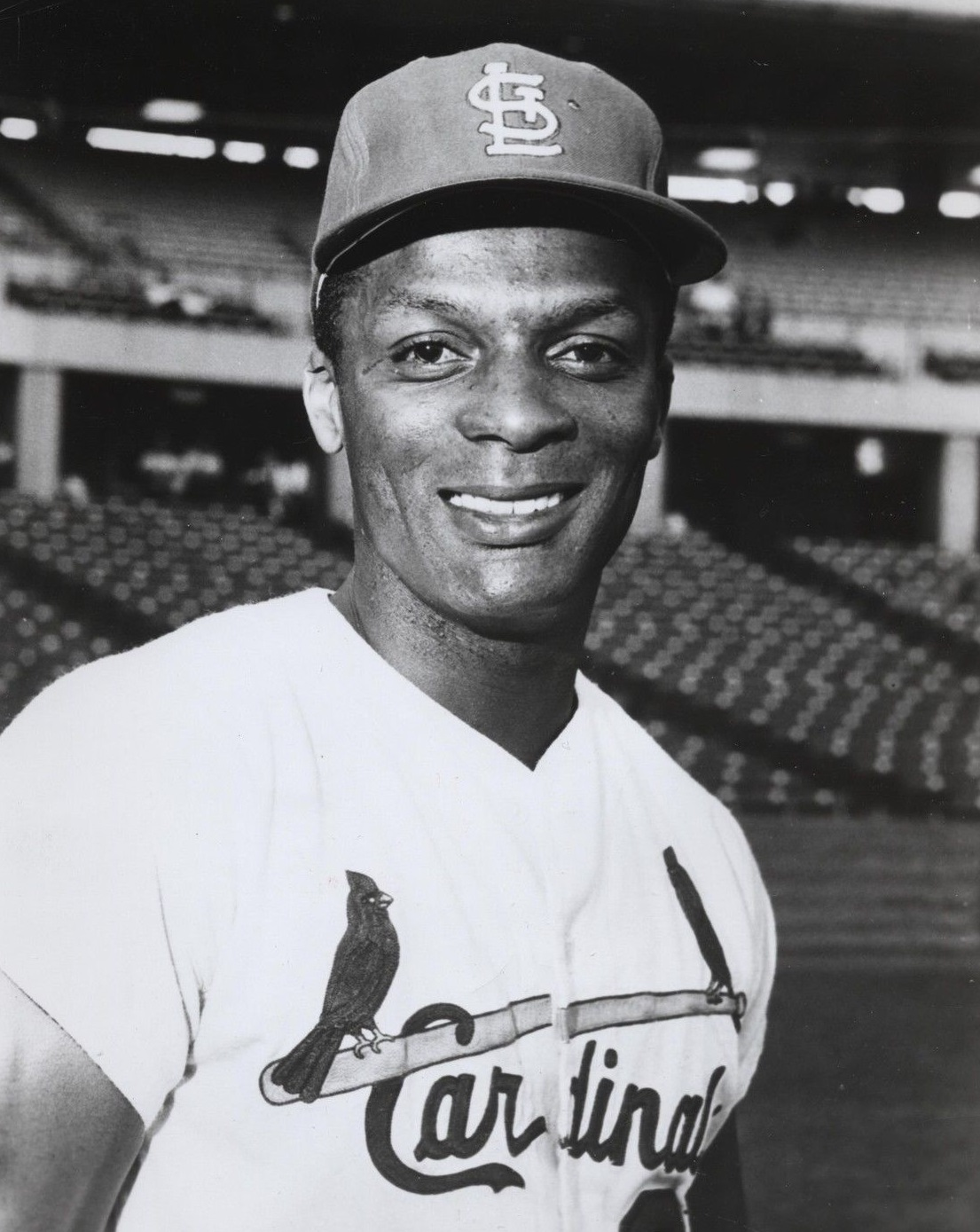
Flood with the St. Louis Cardinals

Charles Curtis Flood was born on January 18, 1938, in Houston, Texas, the youngest of Laura and Herman Flood's six children. The family moved to Oakland, California, two years later in search of the naval jobs that had been created by the United States's pending entry into World War II. Flood began playing baseball around the age of seven or eight, and he joined his first organized team in 1947, catching for Junior's Sweet Shop. In addition to playing American Legion Baseball, Flood attended McClymonds High School with future MLB player Frank Robinson, who was two years his senior. Throughout his adolescence, Flood transitioned from catcher to shortstop and finally center fielder. Outside of baseball, his primary passion was in the visual arts, inspired by his high school art teacher Jim Chambers. Flood knew that he wanted a career in either art or baseball, but he had been warned by coach George Powles that his diminutive size and his race would impede his progression in professional baseball.

On January 30, 1956, three days after graduating from high school, Bobby Mattick, a scout for the Cincinnati Reds, offered Flood a $4,000 contract to join the team. Flood was assigned to the minor league High Point-Thomasville Hi-Toms, where he encountered segregation and racist chants from the fans. He was successful on the field, however, batting .340 with 29 home runs and 128 runs scored, and he was promoted to the Reds as a September call-up. Flood made his major league debut on September 9, pinch running for Smoky Burgess in a 6–5 loss to the St. Louis Cardinals.

Once the season ended, Flood met with Reds general manager Gabe Paul, who explained that while the team had been impressed by Flood's performance, they were not in a financial position to increase his salary, which would stay at $4,000 ($46,000 in modern dollars) again for the 1957 season. Flood realized after this meeting the gravity of the reserve system, later saying, "I could only play where they elected to send me. This was baseball law. It was beyond question or dispute. It was taken entirely for granted." The Reds assigned Flood to the Dominican Winter League to teach him third base, which they hoped he would play in the future. When he returned, he was assigned to the Savannah Reds of the South Atlantic League. Flood's batting average fell significantly in Savannah, which Paul used as a reason not to raise his salary for the 1958 season. Paul also informed Flood that he would have to report to the Venezuelan Winter League and learn how to play second base.

On December 5, 1957, the Reds traded Flood and Joe Taylor to the St. Louis Cardinals in exchange for Marty Kutyna, Ted Wieand, and Willard Schmidt, a trade which came with a 25 percent raise. The Cardinals' owner, Gussie Busch, was motivated to acquire more black baseball players to increase the team's local popularity, and he had failed to acquire Willie Mays and Ernie Banks. Flood spent three weeks in the Cardinals' farm system before debuting with his new team on May 2, 1958, where he faced the team that traded him. He did not become an everyday player in St. Louis until midway through the 1961 season, when manager Solly Hemus was fired and replaced by Johnny Keane.

From 1965 to 1967, Flood had a reputation as an all-star defensive center fielder, setting an MLB record for playing 226 consecutive games without making an error in 555 chances. Flood's salary increased throughout this period as well: he made $45,000 in 1966, significantly more than the average MLB player's $13,000 salary. After making $50,000 in 1967, Flood came to offseason negotiations demanding that his salary be doubled for 1968. When general manager Bing Devine refused, Flood threatened to retire from baseball entirely, and the two parties settled on a $72,000 salary. That season, Flood appeared on the cover of Sports Illustrated, where he was deemed the best center fielder in baseball.

The Cardinals faced the Detroit Tigers in the 1968 World Series. The matchup was fairly even, and both teams remained scoreless through the first six innings of Game 7. Both Norm Cash and Willie Horton singled for the Tigers in the seventh inning, leaving Cash in scoring position. Next up to bat, Jim Northrup hit a long fly ball to center field. Flood slipped on the wet outfield turf, his stumble causing the ball to miss his glove and roll towards the outfield wall. That error allowed both Cash and Horton to score, putting the Tigers up 2–0. Flood apologized to pitcher Bob Gibson after the inning, but Gibson insisted, "It was nobody's fault." The Tigers won the game 4–1, defeating the Cardinals and becoming World Series champions.

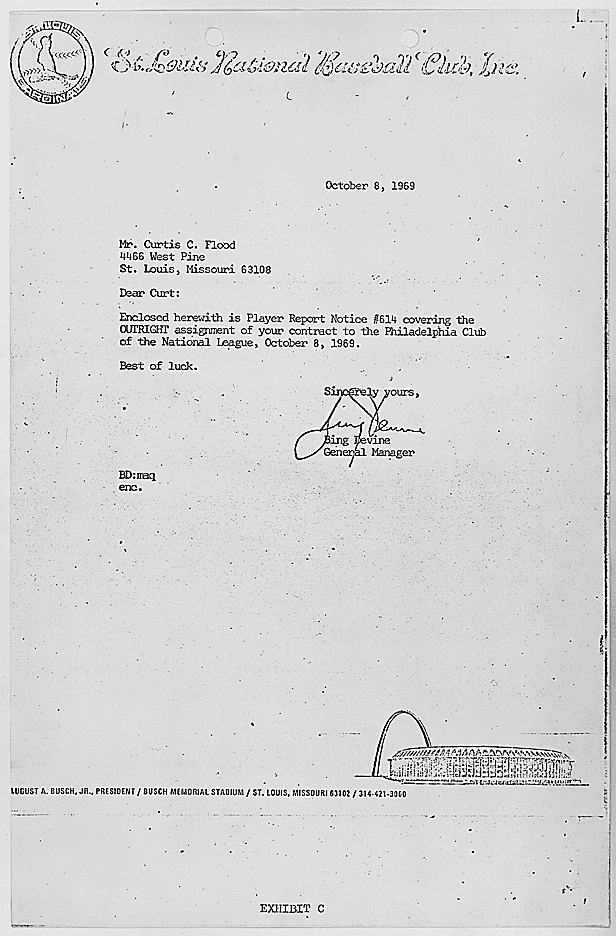
The letter sent by Bing Devine informing Flood he was traded to the Phillies

During offseason contract negotiations, Flood rejected the Cardinals' proposed salary of $77,500 ($680,000 in modern dollars) for the 1969 season. He insisted on $90,000, telling Busch that number "is not $77,500 and is not $89,999". Although he acquiesced, Busch was upset that the negotiations had turned sour at all, as he believed he had a good relationship with Flood. Busch was the first to ask Keane to give Flood a regular playing opportunity in the outfield, he had provided Flood's family with financial assistance, and Flood had once painted Busch's portrait.

Overall, the team's relationships with each other and with management suffered in 1969. The on-field camaraderie that Flood had previously praised seemed to have diminished, while the players were unhappy with Busch after he accused them of being greedy for boycotting spring training in the name of higher wages. Also during spring training, Flood had suffered an injury during an exhibition game against the New York Mets, and the sedatives he was provided by a team doctor caused him to sleep through the Cardinals' annual season ticketholder banquet. Flood was fined $250 for missing the banquet, at which point he began to publicly criticize the Cardinals' front office to local news media. On the field, MLB had made several changes that were meant to increase hitting, including lowering the pitcher's mound and expanding the strike zone. While Flood batted .285 for the year, he was no longer one of the top 50 hitters in the league.

Early one morning in October 1969, a sportswriter notified Flood that he, Tim McCarver, Joe Hoerner, and Byron Browne had been traded to the Philadelphia Phillies in exchange for Dick Allen, Cookie Rojas, and Jerry Johnson. Shortly afterwards, he received the official phone call from Jim Toomey, an executive for the Cardinals that he later referred to as "a middle-echelon coffee drinker in the front office". After hanging up the phone, Flood began to cry, and he spent the remainder of the day waiting for another call with more information.

The next day, Flood, who had been preparing for a vacation in Copenhagen, received a one-sentence letter from Devine saying that he had been traded outright to the Phillies. Flood responded by announcing his retirement from baseball and embarking on his previously scheduled vacation. Devine did not immediately believe Flood, who had previously threatened to retire in order to improve his own salary.

After returning from Copenhagen, Flood scheduled a meeting with Phillies general manager John Quinn, who attempted to convince him that the team was better than its reputation. At the time, the Phillies were known for their lackluster treatment of their players, sending them on red-eye commercial propeller flights where other teams would charter private jets for away games. Flood was particularly concerned about Philadelphia's reputation for mistreating its black players, as Allen had been vocal about the racism he experienced from management, fans, and the press during his time with the Phillies. Flood was not active in the Black Power movement, but he was sympathetic to the cause, and he remained sensitive to the racism and segregation that he had experienced earlier in his baseball career.

== Path to the Supreme Court ==
=== Initial meetings ===
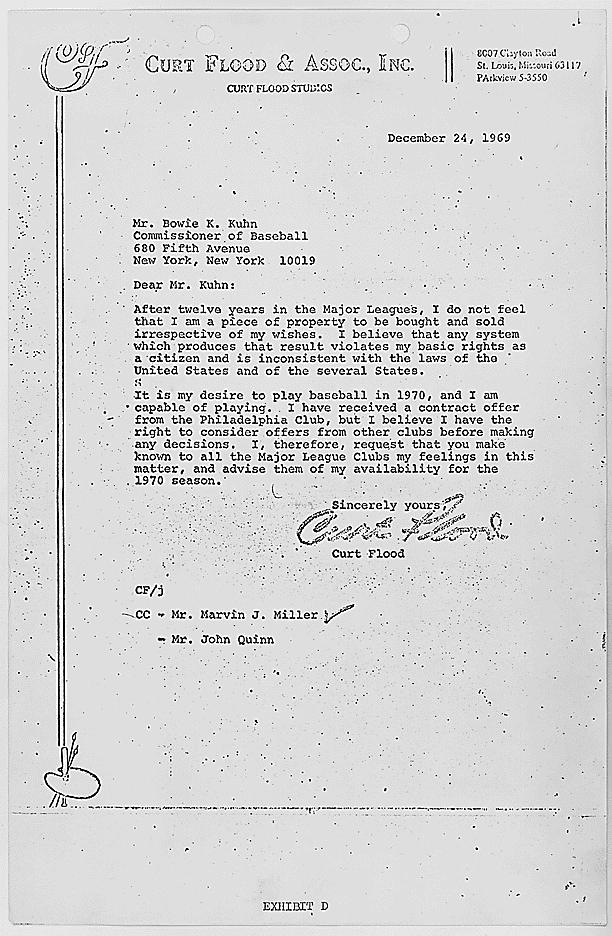
Curt Flood's letter to Bowie Kuhn, dated Christmas Eve of 1969.

After his meeting with Quinn, Flood contacted Allan H. Zerman, the attorney who had helped him set up his photography business in St. Louis, to ask for advice. Zerman suggested that Flood sue, and so he contacted Marvin Miller, the executive director of the Major League Baseball Players Association (MLBPA). In their first meeting, Miller explained to Flood and Zerman that Federal Baseball and Toolson had created a precedent that would make it difficult to eliminate the reserve clause, but that Gardella's case had given them an opening. While Miller warned Flood that he would inevitably lose the court decision and his baseball career, he also provided Flood with attorney Arthur Goldberg, a former U.S. Supreme Court justice. Miller and Goldberg had known each other from their time in the United Steelworkers labor union, and Goldberg had written the majority opinion on several Supreme Court cases relating to antitrust, which Miller believed would help Flood's case.

In December 1969, the MLBPA questioned Flood for two hours at its annual meeting in San Juan, Puerto Rico. Some team representatives, including Los Angeles Dodgers catcher Tom Haller, asked if Flood's case was primarily a race issue, to which Flood responded that his concerns about race were secondary to his belief that there should be a free market of players. Other players worried that Flood was only threatening legal action as a ploy to increase his salary with the Phillies. He assured the union that he was singularly opposed to the reserve clause, promised that he would not drop the case no matter what pressure he received from the owners, and offered to donate any damages he might be awarded to the union. All 25 representatives voted to provide Flood with the funds needed to mount his lawsuit. Despite the unanimous vote, Carl Yastrzemski sent a letter to Miller complaining that his voice had not been heard and fearing legal action would irreparably harm the relationship between owners and players.

The day afterwards, baseball commissioner Bowie Kuhn met with the players, an opportunity he had asked Miller for. He recalled years later that he was surprised none of them brought up the reserve issue, and only later when he learned of the lawsuit did he surmise (correctly) that Miller had told the players not to bring it up with him as it was "too sensitive". This course of action led Kuhn to believe that Miller had already committed to litigating the issue. Kuhn believed the MLBPA had had its chance at contract negotiations two years earlier and should wait until the next contract to try again rather than get free agency through the courts, which he believed alienated the owners. (Note: Kuhn wrote in his memoirs that while he understood that Miller and the players might have given up on negotiated free agency, time was on their side as the older owners most resistant to it were likely to give way to younger executives more open to it within a few years.)

During this time, Paul A. Porter, one of MLB's top lawyers, met with the Players Association and denied any amendments to the reserve clause. When Jim Bouton asked the league's attorneys if they would consider terminating a player's reservation upon their 65th birthday, long after the player would have retired, Louis Carroll replied, "No, next thing you'll be asking for is a fifty-five limit." Meanwhile, in a final effort to avoid legal action, Flood sent a letter to Kuhn on December 24 petitioning the commissioner to let him become a free agent. Kuhn responded that his contract remained under Philadelphia's control and could not be changed. (Note: Kuhn reached out to Flood in March 1970 to see if they could meet informally before trial and resolve the issue somehow; Flood never responded.)

Shortly after the New Year, Flood appeared on Wide World of Sports for an interview with newscaster Howard Cosell. Cosell asked Flood, "What's wrong with a guy making $90,000 being traded from one team to another? Those aren't exactly slave wages", to which Flood replied, "A well-paid slave is nonetheless a slave."

=== District Court ===
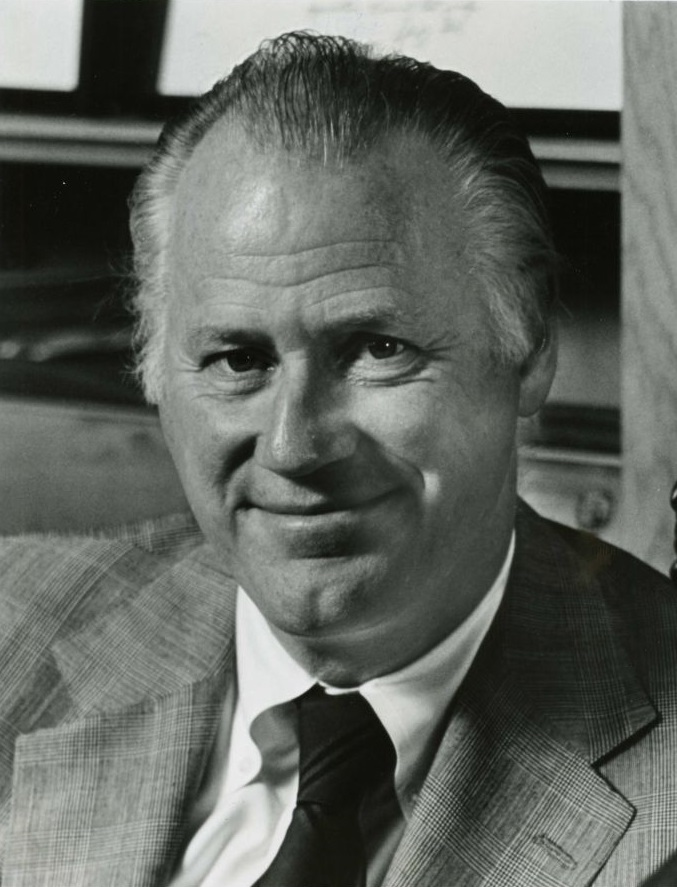
Bowie Kuhn, the Commissioner of Baseball during Flood's litigation.

Flood filed a complaint in federal district court for the Southern District of New York in January 1970. He named Kuhn, the presidents of the NL and AL, and all 24 MLB team presidents as defendants. While Flood did not seriously believe he would be awarded the $1 million in damages that he requested, he was more concerned with having the reserve clause struck down. The following day, Joe Cronin and Chub Feeney, the presidents of the AL and NL, respectively, issued a statement reiterating that the clause was "absolutely necessary", and that without it, "professional baseball would simply cease to exist". Three of the five causes of action in Flood's suit related directly to the reserve system as an antitrust violation. The fourth suggested that the system was a violation of the Thirteenth Amendment, as it "subjects plaintiff to peonage and involuntary servitude". The final cause of action suggested that the Cardinals and Yankees were engaged in additional antitrust violations unrelated to the reserve clause. The Cardinals, owned by Anheuser-Busch, sold only that brewery's products at Busch Stadium, while the Yankees, owned by CBS, only broadcast their games on that network.

At the first hearing, held before Judge Dudley Baldwin Bonsal, the owners were granted an additional two weeks to prepare their reply. Flood sought a preliminary injunction at a February hearing, which Judge Irving Ben Cooper rejected a month later. The injunction was the only recourse Flood's attorneys had to block his trade to Philadelphia, making him either a free agent or reverting his rights back to the Cardinals, and so in April, the Phillies placed Flood on the restricted list for failure to report. Flood's attorneys chose not to appeal Cooper's ruling on the injunction, not wanting to delay the trial further.

Flood's federal bench trial began in May. Shortly beforehand, he received a call from Monte Irvin telling him that Kuhn was willing to give Flood a limited free agency where he would be allowed to negotiate a contract with any NL team. Flood rejected the offer, realizing that to accept it would damage his legal argument. Goldberg, meanwhile, had announced his candidacy for Governor of New York earlier that year, and his campaign afforded him little time to prepare for the trial.

Flood was the first to testify. He was nervous on the witness stand and struggled to recall his salaries and playing statistics from previous years, often using his own baseball card, provided by attorney Jay Tompkins, as a reference. Flood said that he wanted to continue playing in St. Louis, where his photography and portrait businesses were located, but fundamentally wanted the option to accept the best deal that any team offered him. When defense attorney Mark Hughes directly asked Flood if he wanted to abolish the reserve clause, as had been his position throughout, Flood misspoke and said he simply wanted it modified. At the end of his testimony, Hughes asked Flood what he believed would happen if every MLB player became a free agent at the end of the season, to which Flood responded, "I think then every ballplayer would have a chance to really negotiate a contract just like in any other business." Cooper asked Goldberg if he would like his client's response struck from the record, to which Goldberg replied, "No, I like that answer."

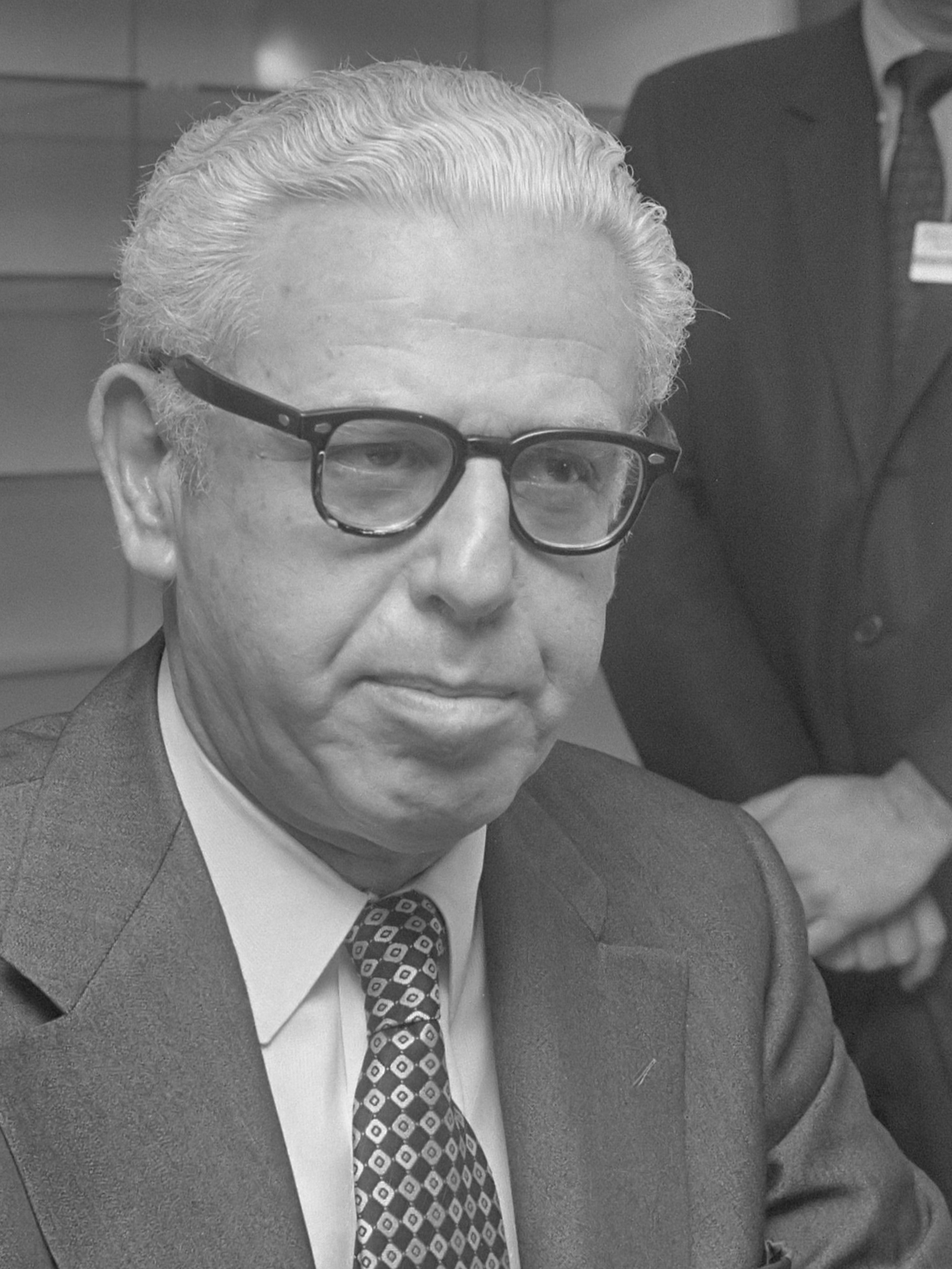
Arthur Goldberg, Flood's attorney

Miller was the next to testify, arguing to abolish the reserve clause. He referred to it exclusively as the "reserve clause system", as the specific clause was no longer included in contracts but was a fundamental aspect of MLB, and he critiqued the fairness of such a system. Flood and Miller were supported by former baseball players such as Jackie Robinson, who testified that without "some change in the reserve system, I can see nothing else but that the players go on strike". Hank Greenberg, a former Detroit Tiger, recalled that he had been notified of his trade to the Pittsburgh Pirates by telegram, and he testified that the "reserve clause should be eliminated entirely, thereby creating a new image for baseball". The one MLB owner to testify in Flood's favor was Bill Veeck, who declared that every player "at least once in his career should be able to determine his own future and not be held in perpetuity".

Defense witnesses included Kuhn, Feeney, Pro Football Commissioner Pete Rozelle, and several MLB executives. One day of the trial consisted entirely of the testimony of Robert R. Nathan, an economic consultant who said that the reserve system did stifle competition, but that the alternative would lead to smaller-market teams like the Milwaukee Braves being choked out by teams in large markets like Philadelphia and New York. This sentiment was later echoed by team owners including Bob Reynolds of the Los Angeles Angels, Frank Dale of the Cincinnati Reds, John McHale of the Montreal Expos, and Ewing Kauffman of the Kansas City Royals, all of whom insisted that the reserve system was necessary to preserve the "economic health" of their respective franchises. On the sixth day of the trial, Kuhn argued in favor of the historical precedents set by the reserve clause and Supreme Court. He was careful not to criticize Flood personally, instead attacking the MLBPA as acting in bad faith and not committing to "realistic negotiations" with the owners.

The trial ended in June, and both sides were given a month to submit post-trial briefs to Cooper. By this time, Flood appeared to have lost interest in the proceedings. He had been absent from Veeck's testimony, having gone to Shea Stadium to watch Gibson pitch against the New York Mets. Flood's team produced an 88-page document detailing the inconsistencies on baseball's position: while baseball may have been exempted from federal antitrust laws under Federal Baseball and Toolson, it was still subject to state antitrust laws. The 133-page brief from MLB's attorneys, meanwhile, suggested that Flood was acting as a pawn of the Players Association. In August, Cooper delivered a 47-page opinion in which he upheld the reserve clause under the precedent set by Toolson. He also rejected the Thirteenth Amendment cause of action, saying that Flood was under no obligation to actually play for Philadelphia: while retiring from baseball would bring him financial harm, that option was still open.

Flood had also argued that if federal antitrust state law did not reach baseball, then equivalent state laws had to. Cooper disagreed, citing the Wisconsin Supreme Court's ruling for the Braves and the Second Circuit's in Salerno, the latter of which was binding precedent on the Southern District. Noting that the reserve clause had not been at issue there, Cooper concluded that "[the] application of various and diverse state laws here would seriously interfere with league play and the operation of organized baseball.

=== Court of Appeals ===
Shortly after Cooper rendered his decision, Flood appealed it to the Second Circuit. In April 1971, a unanimous opinion by Judge Sterry R. Waterman upheld Cooper's decision under Federal Baseball and all subsequent rulings on the principle of stare decisis. It also cited Radvovich to suggest that while baseball's exemption from the antitrust laws under which other sports leagues fell was "unrealistic", "inconsistent", and "illogical", it was still the Supreme Court's prerogative to overrule it and Toolson. Judge Leonard P. Moore wrote a concurring opinion tracing in greater detail the history of baseball and its antitrust exemption, which he did not believe the Supreme Court would revoke. He concluded that, aside from the Chicago Black Sox scandal baseball had managed to grow and retain the public's interest remarkably well without judicial intervention. "[I] would limit the participation of the courts in the conduct of baseball's affairs to the throwing out by the Chief Justice (in the absence of the President) of the first ball of the baseball season."

In July, Flood's attorneys filed a certiorari petition with the clerk of the U.S. Supreme Court, the first step towards asking the Court to hear the case. MLB's attorneys submitted their response to the writ in August, and the Court agreed to hear the case two months later, a decision that troubled Kuhn since it indicated that at least four justices saw a potential issue with the case and might be inclined to reverse.

In his absence from the Phillies as the case moved through the courts, Flood's rights returned to the Cardinals, who negotiated another trade with Philadelphia. The Phillies received two minor league prospects and placed Flood on their voluntary retirement list, which meant that he did not count against their 40-man roster, but if he chose to return to baseball, he could only play for Philadelphia. The Washington Senators acquired Flood's rights from Philadelphia partway through the 1971 season, and Flood accepted a one-year, $110,000 contract to recoup the financial losses that came with missing the 1970 season. Senators owner Bob Short promised Flood that accepting a deal with the team would not damage his court case, as he could argue that he had already accrued damages from missing the previous season.

Flood played only 13 games with the Senators, quitting on April 28 after performing poorly, and moved to Madrid to distance himself from baseball and the stress of his court case, but still collecting $55,000 in salary. "I tried", he wrote in a telegram to Short. "Very serious problems mounting every day. A year and a half is too much."

== Before the Court ==
Once the Supreme Court agreed to hear the case, both sides submitted briefs. Flood's attorneys received a two-week extension from Justice Thurgood Marshall and submitted theirs in December 1971, while MLB responded at the end of January 1972. Goldberg's brief had eliminated the Thirteenth Amendment concerns entirely and focused on how the reserve system had become "drastically more restrictive" since its introduction and previous litigation. Paul Porter and Lou Hoynes responded to Goldberg's antitrust assertions by arguing that Flood's case was a labor dispute that should have been settled in a collective bargaining agreement (CBA) between league and union, not in court.

=== Oral arguments ===
Oral arguments in Flood v. Kuhn were heard on March 20, with both sides allowed to speak for 30 minutes. Goldberg, appearing before the Court since he had left it in 1965, went first on Flood's behalf, speaking of the unfairness of the reserve clause and how it had in 1965 been made worse through its extension to rookie players signing their first contracts to play in the minor leagues. He told Justice William J. Brennan Jr. that Flood would oppose the reserve clause even if it had been the result of collective bargaining. Justice Byron White asked if playing baseball was not covered under the labor exemption to antitrust law; Goldberg noted that Kuhn himself had described baseball as entertainment, which the Court had previously ruled was interstate commerce. "Every commentator has said it's an anomaly in the law to adhere to Federal Baseball and Toolson as wrongly decided", Goldberg concluded, commenting that if the steelworkers union, a former client, had agreed to similar terms with any employers binding a member or members to them for his entire working life, that contractual provision would clearly be seen as a per se violation of the law.

Paul A. Porter came next, arguing for Kuhn and MLB in rebuttal that baseball was unique, even compared to other sports, in the antitrust context because of the portion of its revenues invested in player development through their extensive farm systems. Louis Hoynes, counsel for the NL, argued MLB's case. (Note: Hoynes, who had never argued a case before the Court, was Kuhn's personal choice for the assignment. Los Angeles Dodgers owner Walter O'Malley had tried to persuade Kuhn to argue the case himself. "While I would have loved the challenge", he wrote, "I knew perfectly well that my executive responsibilities precluded me from giving the matter the kind of single-minded dedication it required.") He placed great emphasis on the MLBPA, which he said "has in fact controlled this litigation from beginning to end", to suggest that the real goal of the lawsuit was to make far more sweeping changes to the business aspect of baseball, and that these matters were far better addressed at the bargaining table.

=== Deliberations ===
Following oral arguments, the Court took an unofficial voice vote in order of seniority. Chief Justice Warren E. Burger began by admitting that "Toolson is probably wrong", but he did not say whether he believed the lower courts' rulings should be reversed. William O. Douglas voted to reverse the previous decisions and wanted to remand the case to district court for a new trial. Brennan agreed that Toolson should be overturned, but he also believed that Flood was primarily a labor dispute that should remanded for a new trial that did not focus on antitrust concerns. Justice Potter Stewart voted to uphold the lower courts' rulings under Congress's explicit decision to exempt baseball from antitrust laws, and his position was joined by Marshall and Justice Byron White. Justice Harry Blackmun also saw the case as a labor dispute and tentatively voted to affirm. Justice Lewis F. Powell Jr. recused himself, as he owned stock in Anheuser-Busch. While waiting for confirmation that the Cardinals were a subsidiary of the company, he stated in a voice vote that he believed the lower courts' rulings should be reversed, as it made "no sense" that baseball received different treatment in antitrust cases than other sports such as football. Justice William Rehnquist, the last to vote, affirmed the decision of the lower courts.

Without Powell, the court remained at a 4–4 deadlock until Burger changed his vote in favor of MLB. On June 19, 1972, the Court delivered its decision, with both parties notified by telegram that the lower courts' rulings had been upheld by a 5–3 margin. Blackmun, Stewart, Rehnquist, Burger, and White formed the majority, with Douglas, Marshall, and Brennan dissenting. Had the 4–4 tie remained, the decision of the lower courts would have been affirmed, but the Court would not have published any opinions. None of the opinions specifically addressed the reserve clause; all instead focused on baseball's antitrust exemption.

== Decision ==
=== Blackmun's opinion ===
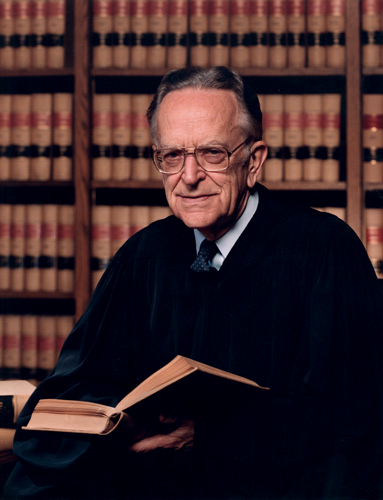
Harry Blackmun wrote the majority opinion in Flood v. Kuhn, with the first section described as an "ode to baseball".

Stewart had been asked to select the writer for the majority, a duty which he imparted on Blackmun, a noted baseball fan and the only member of the majority whose opinions seemed to have wavered on the case. Stewart told Blackmun to "do it very briefly ... Write a per curiam and we'll get rid of it". Blackmun's draft was over 20 pages long and divided into five sections. Rather than rewriting the majority opinion after seeing a draft of the dissenting opinions, as is custom, Blackmun's only major alteration between his first and second drafts was in expanding his list of notable baseball players from 74 to 88.

Section I of Blackmun's opinion has been described as an "ode to baseball". The first three paragraphs detail the history of the sport, beginning with the first organized game in 1846 and continuing through the formation of the MLBPA in 1966. This is followed by a list of 88 players he considered great. Some of them were beyond an average fan's knowledge, including Heinie Groh, Dan Brouthers, and Chief Bender. While Blackmun never explicitly cited the origins of his list, he kept a copy of the Encyclopedia of Baseball on his chambers desk, and many of the players he lists are found in The Glory of Their Times by Lawrence Ritter. It is rumored that Marshall called Blackmun after seeing the original draft of the opinion to ask why no black players were included. Blackmun responded that there were no great black players in the golden age of baseball, but he ultimately included Jackie Robinson, Satchel Page, and Roy Campanella. Blackmun denied this rumor, saying that Campanella had been on his original list, and he later said that the one player he had forgotten was Mel Ott. Section I concludes with various baseball arcana, including Ring Lardner's reference to the "World Serious", a line from the poem "Baseball's Sad Lexicon", and quotes from George Bernard Shaw, Franklin Pierce Adams, and "Casey at the Bat".

The remainder of Blackmun's opinion proceeds as standard. Section II, titled "The Petitioner", outlines Flood's career, salary history, and the trade that had provided the impetus for the lawsuit. Section III, titled "The Present Litigation", summarized Flood's lawsuit. Section IV discusses the legal precedents set by Federal Baseball and Toolson. Finally, Section V presents the rationale of the court, with eight specific findings concluding that baseball, while a type of interstate commerce, is also a unique industry exempt from antitrust laws. Blackmun's opinion focuses primarily on stare decisis, conceding that while the decision in Federal Baseball to exempt the sport from antitrust status was an "anomaly", its precedent was sufficient that changes could only be made through Congress.

=== Concurrences ===
White indicated his concurrence in a note, and Burger with a short written opinion. Both explicitly said that they did not concur with Blackmun's Section I. White, a former football star at the University of Colorado, believed that Blackmun's rambling ode to baseball was demeaning to the Court. Burger, meanwhile, showed his sympathy for Douglas's dissent but argued that Toolson had been precedent for so long that he could not support Flood and the upheaval that would cause. "The error, if such it be, is one on which the affairs of a great many people have rested for a long time", he wrote. "Courts are not the forum in which this tangled web ought to be unsnarled." Bob Woodward and Scott Armstrong's 1979 Supreme Court biography, The Brethren, claimed that many justices were embarrassed by Section I's overt sentimentality.

=== Dissenting opinions ===
The three remaining justices wrote two dissents. Justice Douglas, with Brennan concurring, called Federal Baseball "a derelict in the stream of the law that we, its creator, should remove. Only a romantic view of a rather dismal business account over the last 50 years would keep that derelict in midstream." (Note: In a footnote, Douglas stated that he had come to regret joining the Toolson majority and was ready to correct it.) Douglas directly critiqued the assertion that baseball had remained the same in the 50 years following the decision in Federal Baseball, and that the sport had become "big business that is packaged with beer, with broadcasting, and with other industries". He particularly rebuked Blackmun's assurance that Congress would handle any alterations to the antitrust exemption, writing that they had not done so to this point. Douglas was the only member of the Court who had also been on the bench for the Toolson decision, in which he had voted in favor of upholding Federal Baseball. He used his dissent in Flood to express his regret for that decision, writing that "the unbroken silence of Congress should not prevent us from correcting our own mistakes".

Brennan also concurred in Marshall's dissent, a reversal of his voice vote, in which he had implied that he would affirm the appellate ruling on the basis of Congress's antitrust exemption for baseball. "This is a difficult case", he admitted, "because we are torn between the principle of stare decisis and the knowledge that Federal Baseball and Toolson are totally at odds with more recent and better reasoned cases." Marshall focused his dissent on the issue of Flood as an individual, whose rights he believed were impinged upon by a system that held players in perpetuity. He would have overruled both precedents and reversed.

He explicitly invoked Radovich and International Boxing, as cause for the Court to reverse its rulings on baseball to consistently apply antitrust legislation across all professional athletics:

The importance of the antitrust laws to every citizen must not be minimized. They are as important to baseball players as they are to football players, lawyers, doctors, or members of any other class of workers. Baseball players cannot be denied the benefits of competition merely because club owners view other economic interests as being more important, unless Congress says so.

Marshall clarified that he believed the particulars of Flood's case belonged at the level of the district courts as a labor dispute, where that lower court could investigate whether the antitrust violations practiced by MLB circumvented the league's CBA with the Players Association.

== Aftermath ==
The ruling in Flood v. Kuhn came as a surprise to many sportswriters and scholars who were following the case. Harold Spaeth, a political scientist at Michigan State University, had predicted that Flood would prevail either unanimously or with Rehnquist as the sole dissent. Sportswriter Tom Dowling, who had been present for the oral arguments, believed that the case would be remanded, Flood awarded damages, and Kuhn would have to work with the players to create a free agency system. Despite the owners' legal victory, popular opinion had turned against the league, with some polls showing baseball fans favoring Flood by an 8:1 margin.

Kuhn called the decision "constructive" and said he looked forward to discussing free agency with the players in the next contract negotiation. "The last thing I wanted was for the clubs to view the Flood decision as an excuse for doing nothing," he wrote later. "Change was in the wind. Other sports were changing; we could not possibly sit still." (Note: In retrospect he lamented that baseball did not take full advantage of the opportunity: "... the Flood decision provided an ideal climate within which to negotiate a free-agency system that would have better served baseball and its fans than the system that ultimately developed.")

Flood never returned to professional baseball. He lived in Spain for four years, owning a bar and laying carpet. Upon his return to the United States, he worked as a broadcast announcer for his hometown Oakland Athletics, as a Little League Baseball coach, and as commissioner of a senior baseball league. While working for the Athletics, he ran into Kuhn at a 1980 pregame party at Yankee Stadium. During an amicable conversation, Kuhn told Flood that while he had never doubted Flood's sincerity in pursuing the case and did not take it personally, Flood should still not have taken his Senators' salary.

The Gold Glove Award Flood had won for the 1969 season but not formally received due to his legal dispute was presented to him in 1994. He was diagnosed with throat cancer in 1996 and died of pneumonia at a Los Angeles hospital in January 1997. The year after his death, he was posthumously elected to the Baseball Reliquary, which honors players both for their on-field statistics and for their off-field character.

The breakdown of Busch's relationship with Flood was compounded by the Cardinals' decision to terminate Harry Caray's announcer contract. These upheavals left Busch emotionally disturbed, with his son Adolphus Busch IV later writing, "[s]omething had occurred that made him question whether he should stay on as CEO of the company or retire". In 1975, his other son, August Busch III, began a boardroom coup to oust his increasingly erratic father from Anheuser-Busch. While August took over the brewing industry, he allowed Gussie to remain president of the Cardinals as long as he accepted his son's usurpation and publicly announced that he was retiring of his own accord. Busch died of pneumonia and congestive heart failure in September 1989.

== Move toward free agency in baseball ==
=== Seitz decision ===
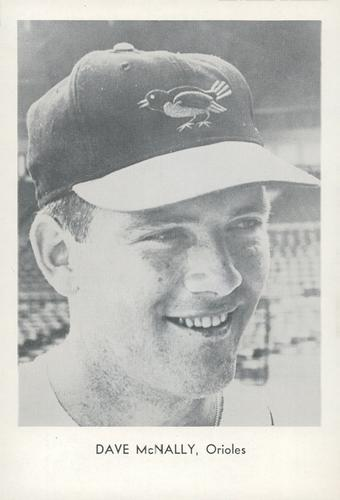
Dave McNally was one of the first players to attain free agency through the Seitz decision.

Their loss in Flood signalled to the MLBPA that any serious revisions to the league's operations could not go through the courts. The original CBA between the league and Players Association had created an arbitration system for labor disputes. Miller used it to the players' advantage, encouraging them not to sign contracts and arbitrate their salary disputes. MLB's first official free agent was Catfish Hunter, who in 1974 took the Oakland Athletics to arbitration over a breach of contract. Arbitrator Peter Seitz declared Hunter's contract with the Athletics void, allowing him to sign with whatever team he wished. The $3.2 million contract he eventually signed with the Yankees, along with a $1 million signing bonus, was at the time the largest of any major league player.

Also in 1974, Los Angeles Dodgers pitcher Andy Messersmith, who had led the NL in wins that season, asked owner Walter O'Malley for both a raise and a no-trade clause added to his 1975 contract. O'Malley granted Messersmith the raise, but he could not offer a no-trade contract, arguing that it was against league rules. Messersmith refused to sign his contract until the clause was added, and the Dodgers renewed his previous contract without his consent. When O'Malley refused to include a no-trade clause again at the end of the 1975 season, Messersmith discussed his options with Miller. The union director connected him with Dave McNally, who had retired partway through the previous season after the Baltimore Orioles traded him to the Montreal Expos. If McNally ever chose to unretire from baseball, the reserve clause meant that he would have to play for the Expos. McNally, a strong union supporter, joined Messersmith to ensure the case went to arbitration rather than letting the Dodgers negotiate independently.

In October 1975, the MLBPA filed grievances on behalf of Messersmith and McNally, arguing that their contracts with the Dodgers and Expos had expired after the 1975 season, leaving both players essentially free agents. The central argument around Messersmith's case regarded the Uniform Player's Contract of the Basic Agreement, which stated that "the Club shall have the right ... to renew his contract for the period of one year on the same terms". Messersmith understood the contract to mean that the Dodgers had the right to extend his contract unilaterally for the 1975 season, but now that the season had passed, he was no longer under contract with the team. The Dodgers front office argued that renewing Messersmith's contract also renewed the one-year option, and that they could continue to extend his contract in perpetuity.

On December 23, 1975, Seitz ruled in favor of the two pitchers that the Basic Argument only allowed unilateral extensions for a period of one year. Moments after issuing his ruling, the owners fired him as an arbitrator. Seitz's decision was based on the question of whether the reserve clause extended to players whose contracts had expired. Rule 4-A(a) suggested that reservations only applied to players under active contract, while Major League Rule 3(g) prohibited opposing owners from approaching reserved players regardless of their contract status. Seitz rested his decision on the Cincinnati Peace Compact that had united the National and American Leagues in 1903, which applied the reserve clause only to players under active contract.

Seitz never addressed the antitrust exemption in his ruling, focusing on the CBA, particularly this provision of the 1970 version: "Regardless of any provision herein, this Agreement does not deal with the reserve system." Because the CBA did not directly deal with the system, any challenges to it were allowed to pass through arbitration. After Seitz's ruling, the owners challenged his decision in federal court for the Western District of Missouri before Judge John Watkins Oliver.

The case turned on the three 1960 Supreme Court cases known collectively as the "Steelworkers Trilogy", (Note: United Steelworkers v. American Manufacturing Co., 363 U.S. 564 (1960), United Steelworkers v Warrior & Gulf Navigation Co., 363 U.S 574 (1960) and United Steelworkers v. Enterprise Wheel & Car Corp., 363 U.S. 593 (1960)) which define the role and scope of arbitration in resolving labor disputes. MLB, through the plaintiff Kansas City Royals, argued that a more recent Court decision modified the Steelworkers precedents such that the issue of the reserve clause was not arbitrable because the agreement demonstrated an intent to exclude it from arbitration. Oliver did not find the record to support that claim and reiterated the dictum from one of the trilogy cases that doubts as to arbitrability are to be resolved in its favor.

Oliver's decision was upheld again by the Eighth Circuit, where Judge Gerald Heaney wrote for a unanimous panel that found no fault with his reasoning. The owners decided against taking their case to the Supreme Court.

=== 1976 collective bargaining agreement ===
Kuhn did not consider the Flood decision to be a victory for MLB's ownership, as it made the reserve clause a target for future contract negotiations. The MLB collective bargaining agreement made its first amendment to the reserve system after the 1973 Major League Baseball lockout. The "Curt Flood rule" provided that any player with 10 years of major league service, five of which had been with their current team, could veto a proposed trade. This CBA expired at the end of 1975, requiring the owners and players to negotiate a new one. After clashing with the players over many aspects of this agreement, the owners instituted another lockout in March 1976 and came to an agreement in July.

Under the 1976 agreement, players who had signed a contract with their team before August 9 of that year would become free agents at the end of that season. The club was allowed to extend their contract for one year, at which point the player would enter free agency in 1977. All players who signed contracts after that date would automatically reach free agency after six years of major league service. Any player with five seasons of service, meanwhile, could demand a trade from the owner and provide a list of teams he did not wish to be traded to. If that player was not moved to an agreeable team by March 15, he would also become a free agent.

=== Congressional response ===
While Congress responded to Flood with two bills that would have repealed baseball's antitrust exemption, they were unpopular with legislators, and the only immediate legal effect was a 1973 bill expanding the broadcast of sold-out regular-season professional sporting events. Their next move was to create the Select Committee on Professional Sports in May 1976, which was presided over by California Democrat B. F. Sisk.

The Sisk Committee explored several contemporary issues in professional sports, including baseball's antitrust exemption. The league argued that the exemption was necessary to maintain a competitive balance among teams, and the Committee was also tempted to uphold the exemption through veiled promises that new MLB franchises would expand into their districts. While the Sisk Committee ultimately found that there was no adequate justification for baseball's antitrust exemption and recommended that it be lifted accordingly, no bills to that effect were introduced. The committee also recommended a successor committee be established on sports antitrust law, but it was never established; a study was done in 1981. Representative Gillis Long attempted to pass a bill that would strip MLB of its "favorite son treatment", which he announced in a hearing with NBA Commissioner Larry O'Brien, but it died in committee.

In January 1995, a bill that would have eliminated baseball's antitrust exemption was introduced to the Senate, where it died in committee soon after the resolution of the 1995 strike. Senator Orrin Hatch reintroduced the bill the day after Flood's death as the "Curt Flood Act of 1997". The bill amended the Clayton Act to "clarify that major league baseball players and owners have the same legal rights, and the same restrictions, under the antitrust laws as the players and owners in other professional sports leagues". The bill was voted out of committee that October and was approved by Congress the following January. President Bill Clinton signed the Curt Flood Act of 1998 (CFA) into law on October 28, 1998. While the relationships between major league players and ownership now fell under federal antitrust protections, (Note: The act explicitly applied only to major league players, and in 2017 the Ninth Circuit held minor-league player relations were still under the exemption.) other aspects of professional baseball, including franchise expansion, relocation, ownership, and ownership transfers, as well as "the marketing and sales of the entertainment product", remained exempt.

The Furthering Access and Networks for Sports Act, known as the FANS Act, initially proposed to further limit the exemption. Introduced in the Senate by Richard Blumenthal, Democrat of Connecticut, in 2013, with cosponsorship by Republican John McCain of Arizona, it was primarily motivated by fan anger over the control exerted over cable and Internet broadcasts of games by all four professional sports leagues and major cable providers. While its greatest changes were proposed for the SBA, primarily affecting the NFL's blackout policies, it also would have repealed the language of the CFA that keeps the reserve clause in force for minor league players and the language that applies to broadcasting. The Judiciary Committee held hearings on it over a year later, but it never came to any vote. In the next Congress the two senators reintroduced the bill, but without the provisions amending the CFA. It was again referred to the Judiciary Committee and died there.

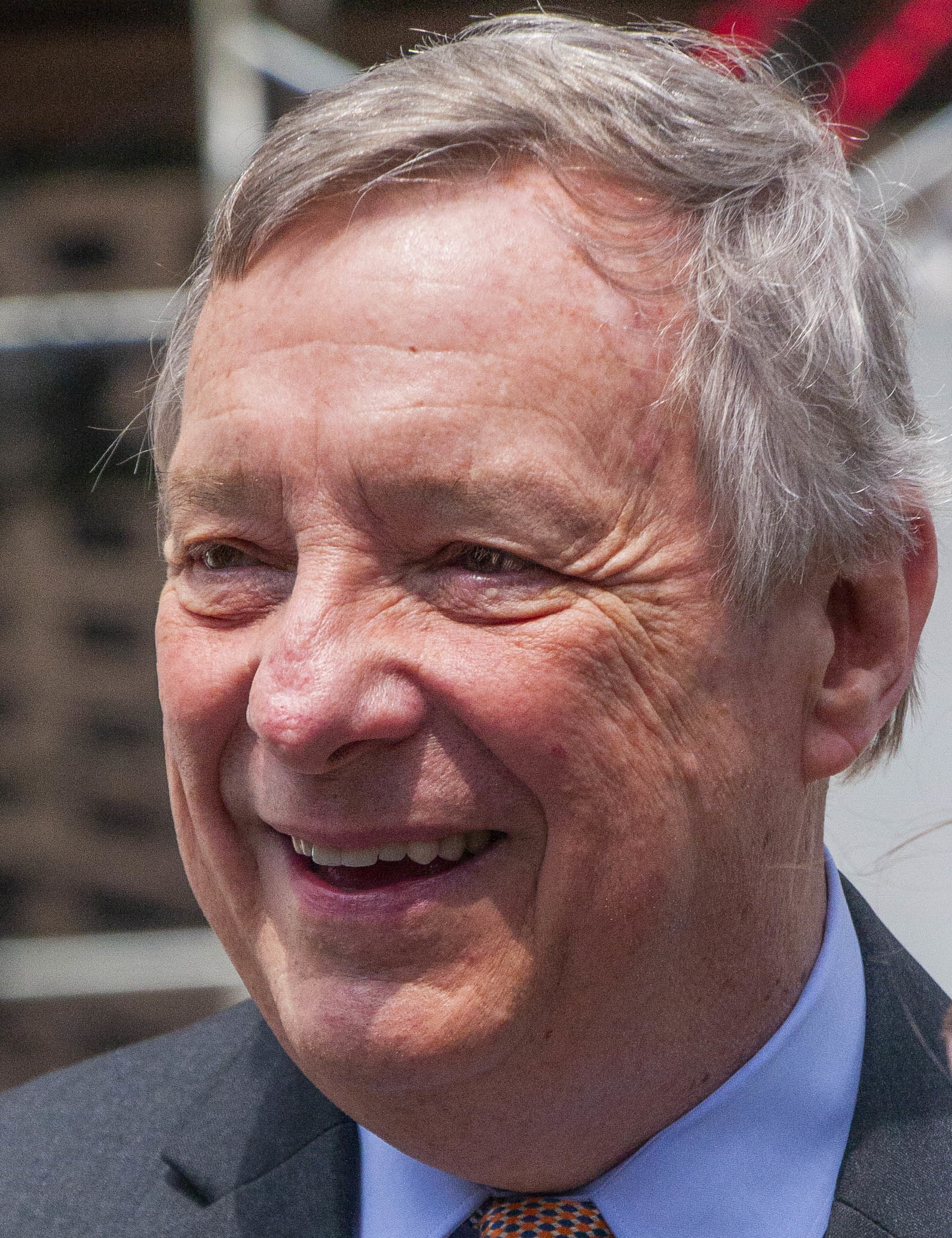
Sen. Dick Durbin, in 2019

Seven years later, in the wake of the 2021–22 lockout, MLB's first work stoppage in a quarter-century, Democratic Senator Dick Durbin of Illinois, chairman of the Judiciary Committee, said that "at this moment in time we should be revisiting this issue" of baseball's antitrust exemption. A Republican member of the committee, Mike Lee of Utah, had already introduced a bill to end the exemption the year before. "There's no reason that Major League Baseball should be treated any differently than any other professional sports leagues in America" he had said then. Other Republicans on the committee, such as Ted Cruz of Texas, supported the bill because they were upset about MLB's decision to move the 2021 All-Star Game from Atlanta following protests over the Georgia legislature's passage of a controversial electoral reform law.

== Subsequent jurisprudence ==
=== Philadelphia Hockey case ===
Later in 1972, Judge Leon Higginbotham of the Eastern District of Pennsylvania became the first to consider an extension of the baseball antitrust exemption in the wake of Flood. Philadelphia World Hockey Club, Inc. v. Philadelphia Hockey Club, Inc. was brought by the Philadelphia Blazers of the World Hockey Association (WHA) against the National Hockey League's (NHL) Philadelphia Flyers. The WHA, the first league to attempt to compete with the NHL in offering major league professional ice hockey, alleged that the older league had violated the Sherman Act with its attempts to deter its players from signing with WHA teams. Higginbotham easily found that the NHL was not exempt from antitrust law:

Maybe in 1922 when the Supreme Court decided the baseball case, hockey was also, as Mr. Justice Holmes then described baseball, primarily an effort to give exhibitions with profits and interstate commerce contacts as mere incidentals. But today, as I review the instant record, hockey is primarily a multi-state, bi-national business, where the fundamental motive is the making of money. From its multiple interstate contacts it is a business in commerce subject to the federal anti-trust laws.

In a footnote, Higginbotham acknowledged that the Supreme Court had never had to decide whether hockey shared baseball's exemption. He based his decision on the cases that had denied it to other sports and similar industries, such as Shuster, International Boxing and Radovich. From the text of Flood, he took further note of Blackmun's passing statement that hockey was "presumably" among the other major professional team sports subject to antitrust law.

=== Piazza v. Major League Baseball ===
Two decades later, another judge of the Eastern District, John R. Padova, heard a case claiming baseball's antitrust exemption sufficed to make it a private-party state actor. The plaintiffs, two Philadelphia-area members of a partnership that sought to acquire the San Francisco Giants and move the team to Florida, alleged that MLB had not only conspired with other defendants at the behest of the federal government, the city of San Francisco and other local governmental entities in the Bay Area to prevent the move but, in the process, defamed plaintiffs by insinuating that they had connections to organized crime. Padova cited Jackson v. Metropolitan Edison Co., in which the Supreme Court had held that the extensive regulation of a public utility does not make it a state actor, and San Francisco Arts & Athletics, Inc. v. United States Olympic Committee, which held the same regarding the respondent's trademark on the term "Olympic" regarding athletic contests, denying its use by the organizers of the Gay Games. "Simply uttering the word 'encouraged,' however, is not enough to equate Baseball's actions with those of the federal government", Padova wrote. "[T]he governmental involvement alleged here can, at best, be viewed as mere acquiescence, as opposed to the 'significant,' active encouragement required to adequately link defendants' actions to the federal government."

=== Postema v. National League ===
A 1992 suit by a female minor league umpire alleging gender discrimination revisited the question Salerno had brought but in the post-Flood era: does the antitrust exemption extend to baseball's relationships with its non-player employees? Finding that the baseball trilogy offered "little guidance" in that area, Judge Robert P. Patterson Jr. of the Southern District took note of Flood's reference to the exemption being rooted in baseball's "unique characteristics and needs" and the Wisconsin Supreme Court's Braves dictum that the antitrust exemption probably did not cover all business activities related to baseball. "[T]he exemption does not provide baseball with blanket immunity for anti-competitive behavior in every context in which it operates", Patterson concluded. "Anti-competitive conduct toward umpires is not an essential part of baseball and in no way enhances its vitality or viability." (Note: But see Wyckoff v. Office of the Commissioner of Baseball, 211 F.Supp. 615, 626–628 (S.D.N.Y. 2016), aff'd 705 Fed.Appx. 26 (2nd Cir., 2017), holding that scouts are integral to the game in their capacity as talent evaluators and thus their employment relations are covered by the antitrust exemption.)

=== Major League Baseball v. Crist ===
Florida officials again attempted to investigate MLB in the wake of its 2001 contraction plan, which would have shut down two franchises that conducted spring training in the state. Again MLB responded that the antitrust exemption applied to quash the state's civil investigative demands (CIDs). On appeal, an Eleventh Circuit panel revisited the issue of Milwaukee Braves: what aspects of baseball can state antitrust law regulate?

Judge Gerald Bard Tjoflat wrote that the number of teams that play was another decision "integral to the business of baseball" and thus beyond the reach of federal law. A paragraph in Flood that briefly addressed the state antitrust issue was, while "hardly a model of clarity", led him to accept MLB's theory that under the Supremacy Clause, "the Supreme Court's Commerce Clause jurisprudence, when applied to professional baseball, must be read to establish a unique per se rule that prohibits the application of state antitrust laws when the federal exemption is triggered ... [F]ederal law establishes a universal exemption in the name of uniformity." (Note: In a 1997 dictum, Richard Posner, Chief Judge of the Seventh Circuit, read Flood as a rare instance where Congress had, through conferring an antitrust exemption, barred state antitrust enforcement.) In his conclusion, Tjoflat conceded that while "[t]he exemption was founded upon a dubious premise, and it has been upheld in subsequent cases because of an equally dubious premise", and it was thus understandable that Florida should seek a more limited exemption, that was nevertheless the prerogative of the Supreme Court or Congress.

=== Right Field Rooftops v. Chicago Cubs ===
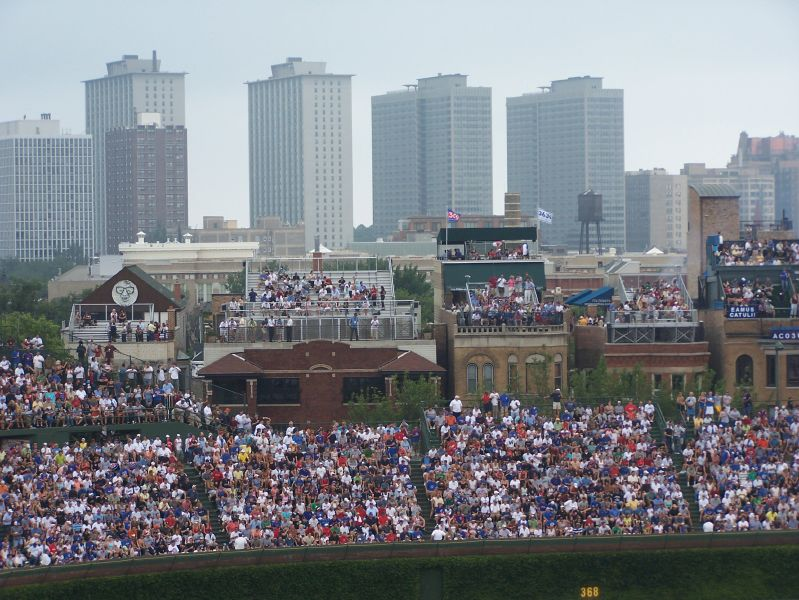
Wrigley Rooftops during a game

In 2013 the owners of two of the Wrigley Rooftops, the viewing areas erected atop privately owned buildings on the streets adjacent to Wrigley Field, from which Chicago Cubs games and other events at Wrigley Field can be seen, sued the team alleging its owners, the Ricketts family, had been indulging in anticompetitive practices to force the sale of some of the remaining rooftops to the team in violation of an earlier agreement. The plaintiffs anticipated the team's likely invocation of the baseball antitrust exemption by arguing that it applied only to MLB and not individual franchises. Judge Virginia M. Kendall of the Northern District of Illinois rejected that argument in denying them a preliminary injunction, noting that Toolson had affirmed Federal Baseball with a team as defendant, as well as the Cincinnati Reds in its companion case, Corbett v. Chandler.

=== Scope of exemption ===
Since Flood lower courts have divided over whether baseball's antitrust exemption was limited in scope to the reserve clause (the minority position, taken by only two courts) or covered baseball generally. To resolve this question, some courts have generally turned the inquiry to the role the reserve clause played in the original Federal Baseball case, or looked to the text of the three Supreme Court decisions establishing and affirming the exemption.

==== Broad "business of baseball" exemption ====
The first court to consider this question after Flood (Note: In 1971, the District of Oregon had heard Portland Baseball Club Inc. v. Kuhn, in which the Pacific Coast League's (PCL) Portland Beavers sought to force MLB to offer the PCL and its teams compensation for the loss of territory to the expansion Seattle Pilots and San Diego Padres, who had paid $10 million between them to join the AL and NL respectively while offering the PCL nothing to compensate for the loss of territory, which had led Portland's ownership to sell the team. Judge Gus J. Solomon held for the defendants on every count and cited the existing law as a reason why, including the district court holding in Flood. The club appealed, and in 1974, two years after Flood the Ninth Circuit affirmed in a per curiam opinion that deferred to Solomon's and affirmed his dismissal of the antitrust claim, citing Flood with no explication.) was the Seventh Circuit, when it heard Charles O. Finley & Co. Inc. v. Kuhn on appeal in 1977. The plaintiff, the Oakland Athletics (A's), had sued over the commissioner's decision to block the sales of three players before the 1976 season as "not in the best interests of baseball", a power of the office rarely invoked; Kuhn believed that Finley was almost giving away star players in a "fire sale" in advance of free agency to other teams already rich in talent that did not have to part with any of their stars. The A's argued that Kuhn and Major League Baseball had engaged in restraint of trade and sought damages, in part under antitrust law, which they argued covered the commissioner's actions as Flood had only held the reserve clause covered by the antitrust exemption as outlined in Federal Baseball and affirmed in Toolson.

After the district court had granted summary judgement for defendants on all counts, Judge Robert Arthur Sprecher wrote for a panel that unanimously affirmed. In considering the scope of the antitrust exemption, Sprecher looked to Radovich and the three baseball cases. In all of them, the Court had regular referred to "the business of baseball" as the subject of the exemption, leading Sprecher to conclude that "it appears clear ... that the Supreme Court intended to exempt the business of baseball, not any particular facet of that business, from the federal antitrust laws." In a short concurrence, Thomas E. Fairchild, now the circuit's chief judge, referred to his majority opinion from Milwaukee Braves during his time on the Wisconsin Supreme Court to support his belief that Federal Baseball had not been concerned with the reserve clause.

In 1982 Judge Gabrielle Kirk McDonald of the Southern District of Texas heard a suit brought against the Houston Astros by KYST-AM after the team cancelled its radio broadcasting contract with the station in favor of KENR (now KNTH), also a defendant. The Astros moved to dismiss on the basis of the antitrust exemption, but McDonald noted that Gardella had left unresolved the question, alluded to in later cases, of whether the exemption reached broadcasts of baseball games. She observed that the Sports Broadcasting Act of 1961 (SBA), granting all professional team sports including baseball an exemption from the Sherman Act to allow leagues to negotiate television broadcast rights contracts on behalf of all member clubs. "The fact that interstate broadcasting has on the one hand subjected other professional sports to the antitrust laws, but has not on the other hand affected the baseball exemption, is perplexing."

McDonald decided that there was nothing in the Supreme Court's jurisprudence on the baseball exemption to show that it was anything more than an "aberration" to be left undisturbed. As for Congress, reports prepared prior to Toolson and, later, during the passage of the SBA, showed that it read Federal Baseball as concerned primarily with protecting baseball's right to protect its own league structure, which was not an issue in the instant case. "Congress has not exempted radio broadcasting from the antitrust laws, and there is no reason to believe Congress intended to exempt radio broadcasting of baseball from those laws." (Note: Also in 1982, the newly-created Eleventh Circuit upheld the antitrust exemption in a case brought by a minor league team owner over player assignments, franchise location and scheduling. It held in a short per curiam opinion that those were "an integral part of the business of baseball".)

While Finley had held the exemption broadly applicable to the business of baseball, McDonald pointed to where the Seventh Circuit had qualified it as "not apply[ing] wholesale to all cases which may have some attenuated relation with the business of baseball". Other lower court cases demonstrated this with two recent examples of lawsuits involving baseball and allegations of unfair trade practices in concession stand operations (Note: Sam Ehrlich, a legal studies professor at Boise State who has written extensively about the baseball exemption, notes that the exemption may not have been raised in Twin City because the team itself was a plaintiff, having responded to the suit with a counterclaim of its own alleging antitrust violations by the defendant.) and baseball trading cards, in which she noted that neither defendant had raised the antitrust exemption. (Note: See also Nishimura v. Dolan, 599 F.Supp. 484 (E.D.N.Y. 1984), a suit by one Long Island cable provider alleging another had resorted to anti-competitive practices to prevent it from carrying cable sports channels. Four of the New York metropolitan area's professional sports teams were named as defendants as well, including the Yankees and the Mets, but none raised baseball's antitrust exemption as a defense.) "The baseball exemption today is an anachronism" she concluded. "Defendants have not presented a reason to extend it."

Three cases in the 21st century have dealt with the scope of the antitrust exemption following the CFA. In the early 2010s a group of fans brought suit against MLB, the NHL and several cable companies and regional sports networks (RSNs) over their out-of-market (OOM) sports packages. At the time those who wished to watch all their favorite teams' away games could only do so if they bought a costly OOM package which included virtually all games; many of them were only interested in a small fraction of them and thus found the expense of an OOM package undesirable. Cablecast agreements between the leagues, cable providers and RSNs blacked out OOM games in the team's home markets if they were cablecast on national cable networks. The fans alleged these arrangements were an antitrust violation meant to force them to buy the OOM packages.

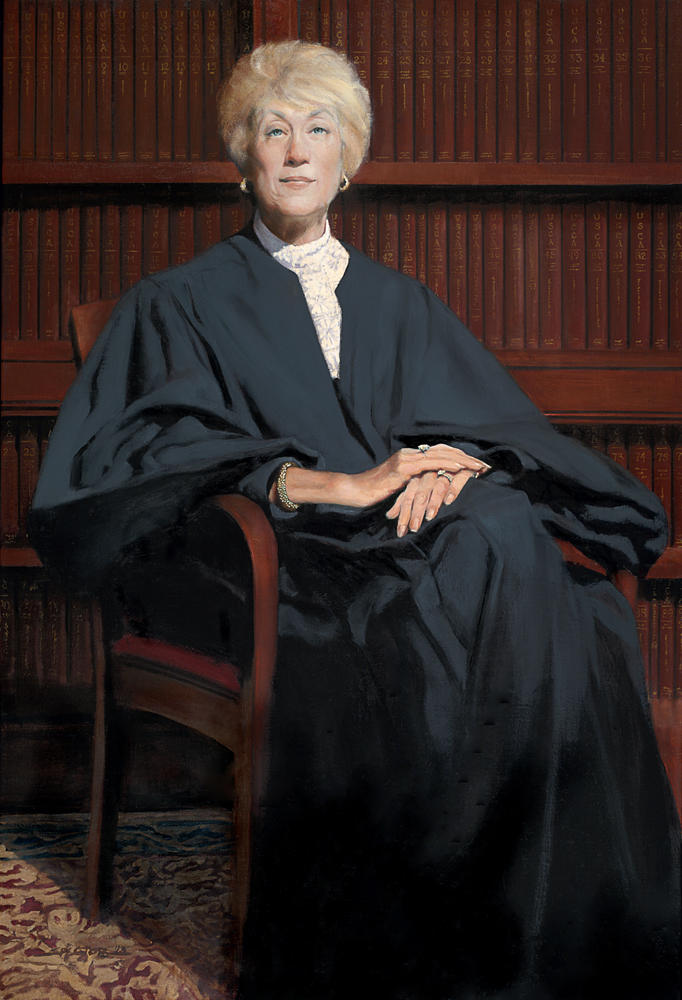
Judge Scheindlin

MLB had raised its antitrust exemption and the Federal Baseball–Toolson–Flood trilogy as a defense. Judge Shira Scheindlin of the Southern District rejected it in 2014. "The continued viability and scope of the baseball exemption are far from clear", she wrote. MLB had argued the language of Toolson applied to all aspects of its business, not just the reserve clause, which had been rendered moot by the CFA. But she responded that none of the cases consolidated with Toolson had mentioned broadcasting. "Indeed, because television broadcasting is an interstate industry by nature, it cannot fall within the exemption defined by Federal Baseball", she wrote. "It would be strange to read Toolson to expand Federal Baseball's holding to territorial broadcasting restrictions sub silentio."

Case law had not resolved the issue. While most courts had found that after Flood the exemption still applied to all aspects of baseball, another had found in 1993 that it only applied to the reserve clause. The SBA indicated to Scheindlin that Congress at that time understood the broadcast of baseball games was not covered by the exemption. She was also unpersuaded by a Congressional Budget Office cost estimate of the CFA that included broadcast rights, since that could not be seen as sufficiently indicative of congressional intent, and language in the Act listing aspects of the baseball business that would not be affected by the law were also too vague to conclude that they were intended as specifically targeted at broadcast rights.

"Exceptions to the antitrust laws are to be construed narrowly", Scheindlin wrote, citing Supreme Court precedent to that effect. Noting again that outside Flood the Supreme Court had indicated baseball's antitrust exemption to be so legally dubious that it could not extend it to other sports, "I therefore decline to apply the exemption to a subject that is not central to the business of baseball, and that Congress did not intend to exempt—namely baseball's contracts for television broadcasting rights. (Note: This holding has been criticized, at least as far as its application to the division of the market into home television territories (HTTs), as misinterpreting the SBA, CFA and existing case law.)

A year later, another case reached the appellate courts seeking to apply state antitrust law to baseball, when the Ninth Circuit heard City of San Jose v. Office of the Commissioner of Major League Baseball. The case concerned an effort by the Athletics to move to a new stadium proposed to be built in San Jose in order to remain in the Bay Area. In order to do so, the Giants had to give their assent as Santa Clara County was within their exclusive territory, and they had not been willing to. The city claimed that MLB was conspiring with other defendants to prevent the move.

The circuit's chief judge, Alex Kozinski, wrote for a panel that unanimously held for MLB. He rejected the city's argument that the antitrust exemption was limited to the reserve clause by pointing out that the circuit had held otherwise in deciding the Portland Beavers case (Note: See note r, above) shortly before Flood, which had turned on franchise relocation, the same issue at hand in the instant case. Further, the CFA had specifically exempted franchise relocation. " Flood's clear implication" Kozinski wrote, "is that the scope of the baseball exemption is coextensive with the degree of congressional acquiescence, and the case for congressional acquiescence with respect to franchise relocation is in fact far stronger than it was for the reserve clause at issue in Flood itself."

In 2017, hearing the appeal of Right Field Rooftops, the Seventh Circuit considered its Finley precedent and held that the sale of seats at locations outside the ballpark was within the antitrust exemption as well. "This exemption protects the general 'business of baseball' from antitrust laws, and the public display of baseball games is integral to that business", wrote Judge William J. Bauer. "By attempting to set a minimum ticket price, purchasing rooftops, threatening to block rooftops with signage that did not sell to the Cubs, and beginning construction at Wrigley Field, the Cubs' conduct is part and parcel of the 'business of providing public baseball games for profit' that Federal Baseball and its progeny exempted from antitrust law."

==== Limited to reserve clause ====
In Piazza, Judge Padova found Finley's reading of Flood and the cases leading to it incorrect. The more expansive reading sought by MLB to bar suit in the instant case, he allowed, might have been correct prior to Flood. But since that case had conceded that the factual basis for the exemption was no longer consistent with the Court's broadened reading of the Commerce Clause, Padova saw Federal Baseball and Toolson's continuing value as precedent to rest solely on those aspects covered by stare decisis in Flood.

For Padova, the "gravamen" of Federal Baseball, as shown in the D.C. Circuit's decision affirmed in that case, was MLB's use of the reserve clause to hamper the FL's efforts to sign players. The Flood Court, he noted, had more than once referred to the clause as the specific issue in Toolson as well, and saw its instant case as similarly limited: "For the third time in 50 years the Court is asked specifically to rule that professional baseball's reserve system is within the reach of the antitrust laws."(emphasis Padova's).

Padova identified two shortcomings with the Seventh Circuit's Finley opinion. First, it downplayed the role the Flood Court saw the reserve clause playing in the previous cases, wrongly suggesting it had only been mentioned twice, and peripherally, in the majority, omitting the quotations he had found significant. Second, "[a]pplication of the doctrine of stare decisis simply permits no other way to read Flood than as confining the precedential value of Federal Baseball and Toolson to the precise facts there involved."

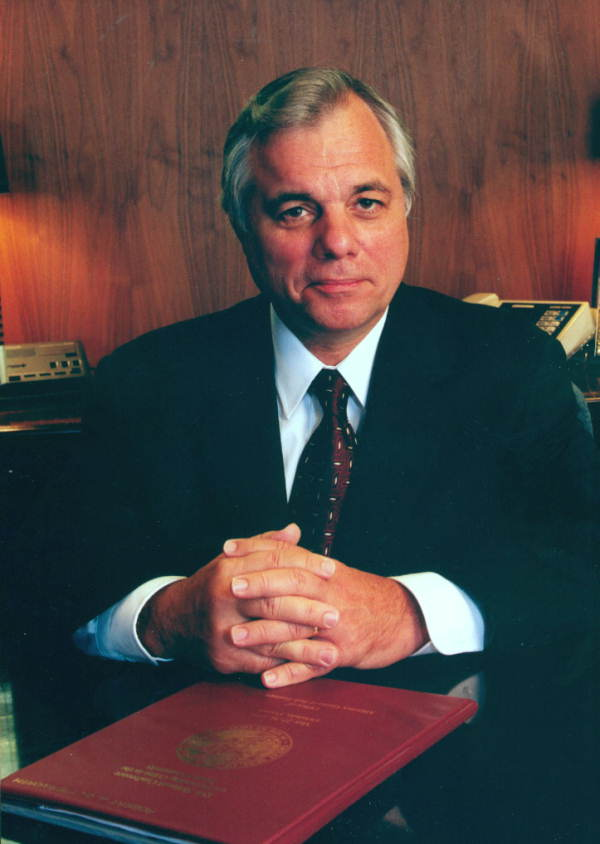
Bob Butterworth

A year later, the Florida Supreme Court was considering another case related to the Giants' possible move to that state. The state's attorney general, Bob Butterworth, had issued civil investigative demands (CIDs) to the NL and other parties in an attempt to find out whether any of them broke Florida state antitrust law to keep the team from moving. The NL argued the antitrust exemption meant they would not have to comply. A trial court agreed, as did the state's Fifth District Court of Appeal, but it certified the question to the state's Supreme Court.

Writing for the six majority justices, Major B. Harding found Piazza more convincing than Finley and other cases that had held similarly. "There is no question that Piazza is against the great weight of federal cases regarding the scope of the exemption. However, none of the other cases have engaged in such a comprehensive analysis of Flood and its implications", he wrote. "In fact, many of the cases simply state that baseball is exempt and cite to one or more of the baseball trilogy without any discussion at all." (Note: In 1999, hearing another case related to the potential Giants' move, Judge Steven Douglas Merryday of the Middle District of Florida commented that the Florida Supreme Court's decision here was "utterly foreign to the unquestionable weight of governing federal authority" and seemed premised on the expectation that the Supreme Court would eventually revoke baseball's exemption. "Perhaps so. However, the boundaries of the federal antitrust laws in general and the baseball exemption in particular are not subject to accretion or reliction in response to a change of the tide at the Florida Supreme Court.")

Concurring justice Ben Overton said that Piazza had changed his mind on the issue. He called on the U.S. Supreme Court to take the case and settle the question. The one dissenter, Parker Lee McDonald, mostly quoted at length from the trial judge's opinion holding that the question of franchise relocation was an essential part of the business of baseball and thus the antitrust exemption applied, barring the CIDs.

The following year, in dismissing a suit against MLB brought by fans and businesses claiming to have been adversely affected by the recent strike, Judge Carolyn R. Dimmick of the Western District of Washington rejected the plaintiffs' reliance on Piazza and Butterworth as attacks on the validity of the antitrust exemption as a bar to their claims. She conceded that the Florida Supreme Court's complaint that Finley and the other precedents supporting a broad exemption were deficient in their reasoning, but noted that both they and Padova had omitted from their analysis the Flood Court's concluding statement quoting from Toolson: "Congress had no intention of including the business of baseball within the scope of the federal antitrust laws."

==== Major League Baseball v. Butterworth ====
But after Butterworth raised Piazza again in a 2001 suit over CIDs he issued again in response to MLB's plan to eliminate two teams the following season, federal judge Robert Lewis Hinkle of Florida's Northern District was unimpressed. Engaging in the same close reading of the baseball trilogy, he held that "[t]he assertion that [Federal Baseball] was solely a reserve clause case is simply not true", noting that the case discussed a wide range of allegedly unlawful trade practices. He criticized Piazza in a footnote: "Whatever the lower court might have thought, the Supreme Court thought Federal Baseball dealt with other issues, over and above the reserve clause. It is an odd approach to interpreting Supreme Court cases to disregard that Court's own description of a case in favor of a lower court's description."

The brief per curiam opinion in Toolson had not mentioned the reserve clause. The later cases in the 1950s—Shuster, International Boxing and Radovich—also lent support to a broad scope for baseball's antitrust exemption. Hinkle observed that the first mentioned only "the business of baseball", and the latter two, as they had also concerned sports, would likely have mentioned the reserve clause in declining to extend baseball's exemption to those sports (The judge found International Boxing particularly on point as the reserve clause has no equivalent in that sport, and thus the Court would have said that if it saw baseball's exemption as so confined).

In Flood, "[n]ot once did the Court intimate in any way that it was only the reserve clause that was exempt", Hinkle wrote. "To the contrary, the Court's articulation of the exemption was always phrased as the business of baseball, never as simply the reserve clause." He followed this with a detailed review of the Flood Court's view of all the predecessor cases. "Not once did the Court intimate in any way that it was only the reserve clause that was exempt. To the contrary, the Court's articulation of the exemption was always phrased as the business of baseball, never as simply the reserve clause."

Hinkle read Flood as establishing that it was up to Congress to modify or repeal baseball's antitrust exemption, rather than defining the scope of that exemption:

... Flood was a ruling not about whether the antitrust exemption should be terminated but about who should make that decision. The Court determined that the decision whether to terminate baseball's antitrust exemption should be made by Congress, not by the Court. That was explicitly the basis for Flood's holding. The Court's rationale remains every bit as valid today as it was when Flood was decided...Flood constitutes an unequivocal, binding decision of the United States Supreme Court, establishing that the business of baseball is exempt from the antitrust laws, as it has been since 1922, and as it will remain unless and until Congress decides otherwise. Period.

=== Alston and Nostalgic Partners ===
In 2021 the Supreme Court ruled in National Collegiate Athletic Association v. Alston that the petitioner did not have the same antitrust exemption as baseball. Justice Neil Gorsuch disparaged that exemption in his opinion for a unanimous Court:

To be sure, this Court once dallied with something that looks a bit like an antitrust exemption for professional baseball. In Federal Baseball Club of Baltimore, Inc. v. National League of Professional Baseball Clubs, [citations omitted], the Court reasoned that "exhibitions" of "base ball" did not implicate the Sherman Act because they did not involve interstate trade or commerce—even though teams regularly crossed state lines (as they do today) to make money and enhance their commercial success.[citations omitted] But this Court has refused to extend Federal Baseball's reasoning to other sports leagues—and has even acknowledged criticisms of the decision as "'unrealistic'" and "'inconsistent'" and "aberration[al]."

That passage set off speculation that the next time the baseball exemption, almost a century old, came before the Court, it might be ready to finally overrule Federal Baseball. Baseball America noted that the opinion also took the unusual step of citing, inline, the amicus curiae brief filed by Advocates for Minor Leaguers, which has sought to have the antitrust exemption overturned. "I think that today's opinion signals that the current composition of the Supreme Court has a significant skepticism about baseball's antitrust exemption", said Harry Marino, director of that organization. "I read their segment of the opinion about the antitrust opinion as an invitation to litigants to raise the issue in front of the court".

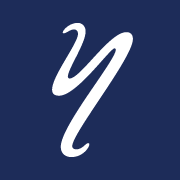
Staten Island Yankees' logo

The case that has been seen as possibly giving the Court that opportunity was already in the courts. As a result of the Minor League Baseball consolidation plan, the Staten Island Yankees' ownership group, Nostalgic Partners, decided late in 2020 that they had no choice but to fold the team after the parent New York Yankees revoked their affiliation with the club. They were not the only minor league team so affected. Since they had bought the club's majority interest 10 years earlier under the promise that the major-league Yankees, who owned a 5 percent stake, would retain that affiliation in perpetuity, Nostalgic brought suit in state court for breach of contract, promissory estoppel and tortious interference. MLB and its commissioner's office were also named as defendants. A month later the Tri-City ValleyCats, based in the upstate city of Troy, who had moved to the independent Frontier League after their MLB parent, the Houston Astros, similarly ended their affiliation, filed a similar suit.

Later in 2021 the court dismissed most, but not all, of both teams' claims. The ValleyCats lost on breach of contract, since their agreement with the Astros had ended in 2020, but prevailed on tortious interference. Conversely, the Staten Island Yankees lost their tortious interference claims while the court found the parent Yankees, from whom Nostalgic had bought the team, had represented at the time of sale that they would never de-affiliate regardless of the status of the contract. Both teams called the results a success and indicated they would proceed with discovery. The parent Yankees noted how many of the Staten Island Yankees' claims had been dismissed and anticipated that the remaining ones would fall on appeal.

In December, both teams, joined by the similarly de-affiliated Norwich Sea Unicorns and Salem-Keizer Volcanoes, filed a federal antitrust suit in the Southern District against MLB. The plaintiffs pointed to the skeptical passage in Alston and said "[we] thus have objectively good reasons to believe that the Supreme Court would no longer apply the 'unrealistic' and 'inconsistent' and 'aberration[al]' baseball antitrust exemption if presented with a proper case for reconsidering it ... This is that case." One of the lawyers involved told a sports podcast that since it seemed that the Court had been inviting a challenge in Alston, "[w]e've decided we're going to accept that invitation."

Sam Ehrlich, a Boise State legal studies professor whose writings about the baseball antitrust exemption include an amicus brief in Alston, told The Washington Post that claim was more than just talk. "Everything in the complaint is compelling. Everything they said is a clear antitrust violation. Baseball, the way it's been operating in the minor leagues, is a clear violation of antitrust law except that it has this exemption."

In a University of Cincinnati Law Review article, Ehrlich was more equivocal. He called the case "arguably the most compelling threat to the baseball exemption in nearly two decades", and suggested two paths to victory once the case reached the Supreme Court, as it likely would have to. One was for the Court to accept Piazza and Butterworth's reading of Flood that limited it to the reserve clause and that the CFA thus merely left the existing exemption intact without clarifying it or defining it in any way. The other way was to follow the "changing market realities" line of thinking that had led to Alston from its predecessor, NCAA v. Board of Regents of the University of Oklahoma, and hold similarly that the changes in baseball since Flood justified setting that decision aside.

But he also pointed to reasons why the case might fail to overturn the exemption. Six of the current justices at that time had been part of a Court that had denied certiorari to recent cases challenging the exemption such as San Jose and Right Field. Also, Alston had targeted a "quasi-exemption" aimed at preserving amateurism in college athletics by one previous decision, whereas Flood reaffirmed an exemption established in two earlier decisions and addressed to some degree by legislation. Lastly, Gorsuch's language in Alston may also have been meant to affirm how unique and special the baseball exemption is: "To this end, Alston and other cases which declined to extend the baseball exemption to other sports only serve to strengthen the baseball exemption even more." Ehrlich described this as the "better read" rather than an invitation to bring a case bringing down the exemption.

== Analysis ==
Blackmun's opinion was immediately unpopular among sportswriters such as Arthur Daley of The New York Times, who decried it as revealing "a total lack of logic". It has retrospectively been criticized by legal scholars as well, who are unhappy both with the rigid application of stare decisis and with the continued exemptions received by baseball for its reputation as the "national pastime".

William Eskridge has referred to Flood v. Kuhn and the other cases in the "baseball trilogy" as "the most frequently criticized example of excessively strict stare decisis" among legal scholars. For Kevin D. McDonald, the case is both "indefensible as a matter of fact or policy" and "an embarrassment to the Court". Roger Ian Abrams, at Northeastern, wrote that the Court had "boxed itself in" by insisting on upholding Federal Baseball in Flood despite acknowledging the different circumstances regarding those two cases. David Snyder went so far as to say that in arguing Flood, "the Supreme Court had completely lost sight of the factual, legal and conceptual underpinnings of Federal Baseball". Morgen Sullivan notes that there is a contradiction in the Flood ruling, as the opinion explicitly states that baseball's antitrust exemption is limited to the reserve system, but ends by quoting a line in Toolson that expands the exemption to "the business of baseball". Mitchell Nathanson, meanwhile, states that the Supreme Court "finally acknowledged the absurdity of Holmes' contention ... but then inserted its own absurdity when it concluded that the fact that baseball is engaged in interstate commerce was nevertheless irrelevant".

Some judges upholding Flood have said they do so reluctantly, only out of duty to precedent, and have criticized it themselves. In Crist, after calling Toolson "shaky" and questioning its divination of Congressional intent from its inaction, Judge Tjoflat called the Court's "beneath that consistency is a layer of inconsistency" defense of the baseball exemption in Flood "puzzling ... [T]he reasoning behind the present rule seems to be a rigid notion of stare decisis, coupled with a hesitancy to render a decision that would operate prospectively only."

Of particular contention to scholars is the Court's assertion that Congress would undo baseball's antitrust exemption. Citing their previous inaction, Abrams argues that Congress had sufficiently demonstrated its refusal to act, leaving the matter to the Courts. William Basil Tsimpris has contrasted the application of stare decisis in Flood with the Court's ruling in Helvering v. Hallock, in which it was stated that Congress was unlikely to take action on a precedent, giving the Court the burden of self-correction. For McDonald, the decision to leave baseball's antitrust status to Congress was a poor interpretation of Federal Baseball, as Holmes never specified that legislation was the only pathway to undo his ruling.

=== Section I ===
In attempting to understand why MLB repeatedly enjoyed antitrust exemptions not afforded to other sports, scholars have largely targeted baseball's romantic reputation in American culture, as exemplified by Flood's Section I. Abrams wrote that Blackmun "may have confused the business of baseball with the glorious game of baseball, thus explaining the sentimentality of Section I, which has been criticized as "rambling and syrupy", "juvenile", and even "bizarre". Savanna Nolan observed that even "the more serious elements of the opinion have a touch of ridiculousness" due to Blackmun's feelings towards the sport. Abrams also argued that Blackmun had likely used Lawrence Ritter's 1966 book The Glory of Their Times as his primary source, and showed how the careers of many of the players Blackmun listed had been impacted, often adversely, by the reserve system.

Stephen Ross takes a slightly more positive view, justifying Section I as a means "to establish the unique role that baseball plays in American culture", but nevertheless rationalizes that romantic picture influenced the Court's decision to exempt baseball from other business rules. Another commentator, Paul Campos of the University of Colorado Law School, has defended it as a "trace of resistance to the hyperrationality of contemporary legal discourse". Blackmun, he wrote:

attempts to evoke the mysterious, inexplicable hold that baseball has on the core of American culture through a kind of prelapsarian naming of names that will both provide the uninitiated with insight into the special nature of baseball history, and represent a transrational justification for his—in the best sense—deeply conservative impulse not to tamper with the traditional social order of the game.

"If Flood is seen ... as a decision grounded in a desire to adopt sound legal rules for sports leagues, Part I makes eminent sense", says Illinois law professor Stephen F. Ross. He reads it as doing exactly that, countering critics who charge it with being an overly strict application of stare decisis by showing how Blackmun and the other majority justices could reasonably, at that time, have been convinced that "contemporary antitrust doctrines would condemn many arrangements among owners that are arguably essential to baseball".

Blackmun himself acknowledged in 1987, that his colleagues on the Court had, as Burger and Douglas's opinions suggest, seen it as "beneath [our] dignity". But he expressed no regrets, save the discovery by his clerks that, after the decision had issued, he had forgotten Mel Ott. In his personal copy of the decision he penciled Ott's name in.

== See also ==
- 1972 in baseball
- Baseball law
- List of United States Supreme Court cases by the Burger Court
- Bosman ruling – 1995 European Court of Justice decision that allowed unrestricted free agency in the European Union

== Works cited ==
- Abrams, Roger I. (1998). Legal Bases: Baseball and the Law. Philadelphia, PA: Temple University Press. ISBN 1566395992.
- Roger I. Abrams, Blackmun's List, 6 Virginia Sports and Entertainment Law Journal 181-208 (2006).
- Banner, Stuart (2013). The Baseball Trust: A History of Baseball's Antitrust Exemption. New York, NY: Oxford University Press. ISBN 9780199930296.
- Belth, Alex (2006). Stepping Up: The Story of Curt Flood and His Fight for Baseball Players' Rights. New York, NY: Persea Books. ISBN 0892553219.
- Crepeau, Richard (2007). "The Flood Case". Journal of Sport History. 34 (2): 183–191. JSTOR 43610015.
- Duquette, Jerold J. (1999). Regulating the National Pastime: Baseball and Antitrust. Westport, CT: Praeger. ISBN 027596535X.
- Sam Ehrlich, Probing for Holes in the 100-Year-Old Baseball Exemption: A New Post-Alston Challenge, 90 U. Cinn. L. Rev. 1172 (2022).
- William N. Jr. Eskridge, Overruling Statutory Precedents, 76 Georgetown Law Review 1361–1440 (1988).
- Goldman, Robert M. (2008). One Man Out: Curt Flood versus Baseball. Lawrence, Kansas: University Press of Kansas. ISBN 9780700616039.
- Knoedelseder, William (2012). Bitter Brew: The Rise and Fall of Anheuser-Busch and America's Kings of Beer. New York, NY: HarperCollins. ISBN 9780062009272.
- Kuhn, Bowie (1997). Hardball: The Education of a Baseball Commissioner. Lincoln, Nebraska: University of Nebraska Press. ISBN 9780803277847.
- D. Logan Kutcher, Overcoming an 'Aberration': San Jose Challenges Major League Baseball's Longstanding Antitrust Exemption, 40 The Journal of Corporation Law 233–258 (2014).
- Lowenfish, Lee (2010). The Imperfect Diamond: A History of Baseball's Labor Wars. Lincoln, Nebraska: Bison Books. ISBN 9780803233607.
- Philip L. Martin, The Aftermath of Flood v. Kuhn: Professional Baseball's Exemption from Antitrust Regulation, 3 Western State University Law Review 262–283 (1976).
- Kevin D. McDonald, There's No Tying in Baseball: On Illinois Tool and the Presumption of Market Power in Patent Tying Cases, 5 The Antitrust Source 1–20 (2005).
- Nathanson, Mitchell (2006). "Gatekeepers of America: Ownership's Never-ending Quest for Control of the Baseball Creed". NINE: A Journal of Baseball History and Culture. 15 (1): 68–87. doi:10.1353/nin.2006.0050. S2CID 155014784.
- John Neville, Baseball and the Antitrust Laws, 16 Fordham L. Rev. 208 (1947).
- Nolan, Savanna L. (2020). "Inside Baseball: Justice Blackmun and the Summer of '72". Green Bag Almanac & Reader. 10 (2): 383–393.
- Stephen F. Ross, Reconsidering Flood v. Kuhn, 12 U. Miami Ent. & Sports L. Rev. 169 (1994).
- Snyder, Brad (2006). A Well-Paid Slave: Curt Flood's Fight for Free Agency in Professional Sports. New York, NY: Viking. ISBN 0-670-03794-X.
- David L. Snyder, Anatomy of an Aberration: An Examination of the Attempts to Apply Antitrust Law to Major League Baseball through Flood v. Kuhn (1972), 4 DePaul J. Sports L. & Contemp. Probs. 177 (2008).
- Morgen A. Sullivan, Derelict in the Stream of the Law: Overruling Baseball's Antitrust Exemption, 48 Duke L.J. 1265 (1999).
- John Tehranian, It'll Break Your Heart Every Time: Race, Romanticism and the Struggle for Civil Rights in Litigating Baseball's Antitrust Exemption, 46 Hofstra L. Rev. 947 (2018).
- Thornton, Patrick K. (2012). Legal Decisions That Shaped Modern Baseball. Jefferson, NC: McFarland & Company, Inc. ISBN 9780786437801.
- William Basil Tsimpris, A Question of (Anti)Trust: Flood v. Kuhn and the Viability of Major League Baseball's Antitrust Exemption, 8 Rich. J.L. & Pub. Int. 69 (2004).
- Weiss, Stuart L. (2007). The Curt Flood Story: The Man Behind the Myth. Columbia, MO: University of Missouri Press. ISBN 9780826217400.
