= 1976 Major League Baseball lockout =

Labor dispute in Major League Baseball history

The 1976 Major League Baseball lockout occurred from March 1 to March 17. The lockout was instituted after the expiration of the league's Basic Agreement. A primary issue addressed during lockout negotiations was the longstanding reserve clause and the players' desire to become free agents. The lockout did not result in any regular season games being canceled.

== Background ==
Following the expiration of the league's Basic Agreement between the owners and the players, there were rumors of a potential lockout due to the inability of the two sides to negotiate a new deal in a timely manner. The Major League Baseball Players Association asked a caucus of team owners if a lockout would happen, but the group told union director Marvin Miller that it "wasn't their decision to make." Commissioner of Baseball Bowie Kuhn stated in a meeting with the league's 24 owners that because there was no agreement in place between the owners and players, dates and times for the upcoming spring training had not been set. On January 15, 1976, Miller met with the Owners-Players Relations Committee for three hours to discuss issues in an attempt to work towards a deal before a potential lockout. The league's pension plan was discussed and Miller advocated for spring training games not to be cancelled in any circumstance. No deal was met at that meeting.

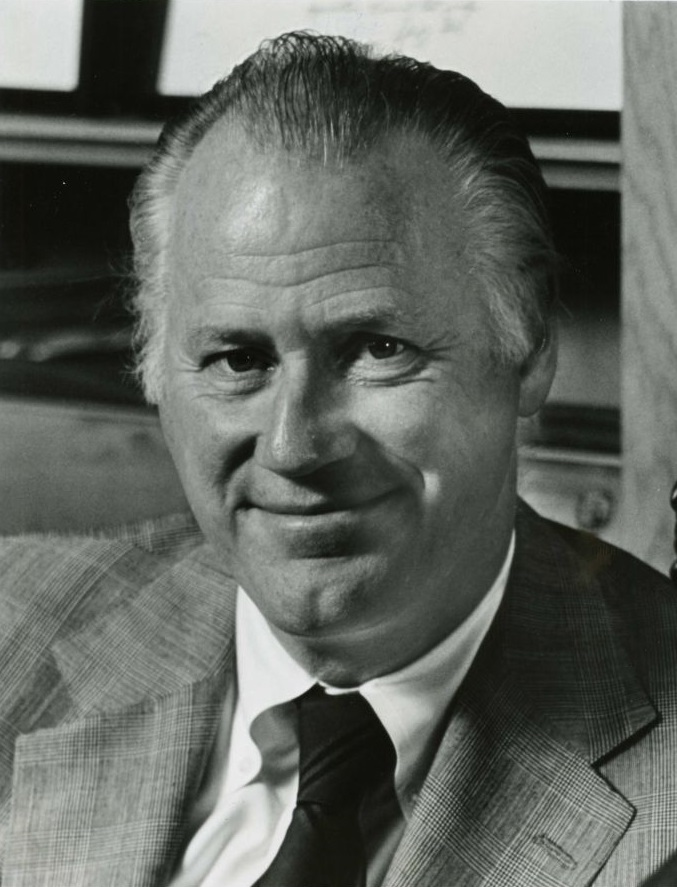
Bowie Kuhn, the Commissioner of Baseball during the lockout

One of the largest issues looming over negotiations was the prospect of free agency. Baseball's longstanding reserve clause began to fall into question as players sought to have more freedom in where they played. The first instance of the reserve clause being challenged was the Supreme Court case Flood v. Kuhn where St. Louis Cardinals outfielder Curt Flood refused to be traded to the Philadelphia Phillies in 1969. The court ultimately ruled against Flood in 1972, but comments made by the justices on the case were used to later nullify the reserve clause in the December 1975 Seitz decision, effectively creating free agency in baseball. With the possibility of a lockout less than a month after the decision, free agency rules and guidelines became a key issue to be negotiated between the owners and players.

Tensions rose as the two sides could not agree to come to a new deal. Marvin Miller claimed that a refusal by the league's team owners to open spring training camps to the players would be a violation of their contracts, thus making them free agents, comparing it to the Catfish Hunter breach of contract scenario from 1974.

The team owners were often blamed as the agitator in the dispute, receiving criticism from various sports media members. Newsday writer William Nack wrote in a February edition that "the owners have since carried on ad nauseam, to put it with charity, and contrived to emerge ironically as graceless, irrational fugitives running naked through the streets of perhaps the most graceful, rational of American games." Longtime sportswriter Red Smith called the owners' actions "childish" in his column for The New York Times.

== Lockout ==
The lockout was initiated by the owners on March 1, 1976. The lockout was not total as Chicago White Sox owner Bill Veeck opened spring training camp to some of his players. MLB and the MLBPA met for five hours on March 2 in Fort Lauderdale, Florida to discuss the reserve clause amongst other issues, but little progress was reportedly made. MLB offered that players must have eight years of service time before being eligible for an option year in their contract, a proposal that union director Marvin Miller deemed "unacceptable." American League president Lee MacPhail rebutted by saying that Miller was "making a mountain out of a molehill." Early in the lockout, there was alleged indication that the ownership group was backing down. On March 2, the Atlanta Braves opened spring training camp to a handful of non-roster players, and several other teams reportedly told their players to get ready for spring training.

The two sides met again on March 3 in Miami Beach for two and a half hours. The players argued that they should be able to have an option year after one year of service, colloquially dubbed the "one-one rule." The owners argued that they could not allow the Seitz decision that granted Andy Messersmith and Dave McNally free agency become the norm. The owners made a revised proposal that would allow players to seek free agency after six years of service time, but Marvin Miller said that MLB was not willing to hear out the MLBPA's counter-proposal.

More owners began to ease their lockout stance; Jim Kaat and Steve Carlton were among 22 Phillies players at spring training camp by March 4.

MLB and the MLBPA conducted another meeting on March 5 in New York City. The meeting lasted for one hour and was abruptly ended in a reportedly negative fashion. The reserve clause was once again discussed but no notable concessions were made. Marvin Miller conducted an MLBPA press conference March 6 to address the meeting, stating that the dealings were professional but not progressive. He announced that the MLBPA was setting April 25 as a deadline for negotiations to conclude, threatening that they would argue breach of contract otherwise and seek to grant players free agency. MLB released a statement, claiming that the players were obligated to comply in the creation of a new reserve system. Following the March 5 meeting, no further meetings were scheduled but the two sides stayed in contact through the phone.

Commissioner of Baseball Bowie Kuhn, who largely separated himself from the dispute between MLB owners and the MLBPA, began to receive calls to alleviate the problem before regular-season games were cancelled. As commissioner, Kuhn held the power to open up the spring training camps and effectively end the lockout.

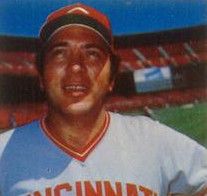
Johnny Bench was among the most vocal of players during the lockout

By March 9, strife developed between MLBPA director Marvin Miller and several players. Some players began to call for Miller to ease up in negotiations and give more credence to the owners' stances. Cincinnati Reds superstars Johnny Bench and Pete Rose claimed that Miller was not listening to the players. Bench joined Tom Seaver and Joe Torre in a trio advocating for a quick resolution so that play could resume. Montreal Expos pitcher Woodie Fryman said that he did not care which way the negotiations swung, just that he wanted to play.

MLB and the MLBPA met again on March 9 in New York City to no avail. The meeting reportedly featured "raised voices" and obscenities coupled with no progress towards a deal. Miller alleged that MLB was misleading the players on the status of the negotiations. Despite the hostile nature of the meeting, the sides agreed to meet again in Florida on March 11 and 12.

On March 10 in Tampa, Florida, MLB met with a contingent of roughly 50 players for two and a half hours to discuss the situation. Johnny Bench, who was among the group of players in the meeting, shared a sense of pessimism, as did MLBPA director Marvin Miller. Bench noted that many players were training on high school and collegiate fields in Florida and paying their own housing fees because they did not have access to team facilities. The groups reconvened in St. Petersburg, Florida on March 11, meeting for two hours but leaving disappointed. A group of players decided to cancel the voluntary practices they were holding at Eckerd College as they believed practicing during the lockout could only stand to benefit the owners.

On March 14, Commissioner of Baseball Bowie Kuhn announced that the regular season would occur and that the regular season would commence on the scheduled April 8 opening day. At the time, Kuhn stated that he had would open spring training once he saw considerable progress between MLB and the MLBPA. At a meeting, Marvin Miller made a new proposal that would institute a one-year test trial of the "one-one rule" so that the two camps could witness its cost-effectiveness and make a later decision. The meeting lasted into the night and negotiators were seen walking around the hotel premises and discussing, leading the media to believe an agreement was imminent. Another meeting was set for the morning of March 15.

On March 16, the ownership group gave their final offer which included an acceptance of the players' much-desired one-one rule. AL President Lee MacPhail said that MLB "bit the bullet" on the rule and added that spring training camps would not be opened until the deal was accepted. MLBPA Director Marvin Miller described the offer as a sudden turnaround from previously hostile negotiations and said that the players would convene to discuss the following day. On March 17, Commissioner of Baseball Bowie Kuhn ordered that training camps be opened immediately, effectively ending the lockout. At the time, the MLBPA had not accepted or declined the owners' "best and final" offer. Miller stated that the MLBPA did not vote on the owners' proposal because it did not address issues that were important to the players' union.

== See also ==
- 1976 Major League Baseball season
