= United Steelworkers v. Warrior & Gulf Navigation Co =

United Steelworkers v Warrior & Gulf Navigation Co
- Court: US Supreme Court
- Citation: 363 US 574 (1960)

Keywords
- Preemption

United Steelworkers v Warrior & Gulf Navigation Co 363 US 574 (1960) is a US labor law case, concerning arbitration over collective agreements for labor rights.

== Facts ==
Warrior & Gulf Co had a steel transportation company from Chickasaw, Alabama. Its employees had a collective agreement through United Steelworkers. In 1956 and 1958 the company laid off workers, from 42 to 23 workers in the bargaining unit as it outsourced maintenance work to other companies which hired some laid off employees at reduced wages, but doing the same work. The workers filed a grievance, the company refused to go to arbitration, and the union began a suit to compel it.

The Court of Appeals, upholding the district court, said that the collective agreement had taken out 'management functions' from the arbitration procedure.

== Judgment ==
The Supreme Court held that the case should go to arbitration. Douglas J gave judgment.

The Congress, however, has by § 301 of the Labor Management Relations Act, assigned the courts the duty of determining whether the reluctant party has breached his promise to arbitrate. For arbitration is a matter of contract and a party cannot be required to submit to arbitration any dispute which he has not agreed so to submit. Yet, to be consistent with congressional policy in favor of settlement of disputes by the parties through the machinery of arbitration, the judicial inquiry under § 301 must be strictly confined to the question whether the reluctant party did agree to arbitrate the grievance or did agree to give the arbitrator power to make the award he made. An order to arbitrate the particular grievance should not be denied unless it may be said with positive assurance that the arbitration clause is not susceptible of an interpretation that covers the asserted dispute. Doubts should be resolved in favor of coverage.

We do not agree with the lower courts that contracting-out grievances were necessarily excepted from the grievance procedure of this agreement. To be sure, the agreement provides that 'matters which are strictly a function of management shall not be subject to arbitration.' But it goes on to say that if 'differences' arise or if 'any local trouble of any kind' arises, the grievance procedure shall be applicable.

Collective bargaining agreements regulate or restrict the exercise of management functions; they do not oust management from the performance of them. Management hires and fires, pays and promotes, supervises and plans. All these are part of its function, and absent a collective bargaining agreement, it may be exercised freely except as limited by public law and by the willingness of employees to work under the particular, unilaterally imposed conditions. A collective bargaining agreement may treat only with certain specific practices, leaving the rest to management but subject to the possibility of work stoppages. When, however, an absolute no-strike clause is included in the agreement, then in a very real sense everything that management does is subject to the agreement, for either management is prohibited or limited in the action it takes, or if not, it is protected from interference by strikes. This comprehensive reach of the collective bargaining agreement does not mean, however, that the language, 'strictly a function of management,' has no meaning.

'Strictly a function of management' might be thought to refer to any practice of management in which, under particular circumstances prescribed by the agreement, it is permitted to indulge. But if courts, in order to determine arbitrability, were allowed to determine what is permitted and what is not, the arbitration clause would be swallowed up by the exception. Every grievance in a sense involves a claim that management has violated some provision of the agreement.

== See also ==
- United States labor law
