= Seitz decision =

Decision ending baseball's reserve clause

The Seitz decision was a ruling by arbitrator Peter Seitz (1905–1983) on December 23, 1975, which declared that Major League Baseball (MLB) players became free agents upon playing one year for their team without a contract, effectively nullifying baseball's reserve clause. The ruling was issued in regard to pitchers Andy Messersmith and Dave McNally.

== Background ==
Since the 1880s, baseball owners had included a paragraph described as the "reserve clause" in every player contract. The paragraph as written allowed teams to renew a contract for a period of one year following the end of a signed contract. Owners asserted and players assumed that contract language effectively meant that a player could be "reserved," by a ballclub's unilateral contract renewal, year after year in perpetuity by the team that had signed the player. That eliminated all market competition and kept salaries relatively low.

The reserve clause was challenged in two Supreme Court cases—Toolson v. New York Yankees, Inc. in 1953 and Flood v. Kuhn in 1972—both of which upheld the reserve clause.

Dave McNally and Andy Messersmith both played professional baseball as starting pitchers. McNally first played professionally in 1961, and made his major-league debut in 1962 with the Baltimore Orioles. Messersmith first played professionally in 1966, and made his major-league debut in 1968 with the California Angels.

== Grievance ==
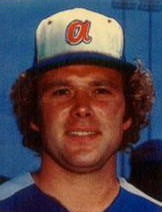
Andy Messersmith

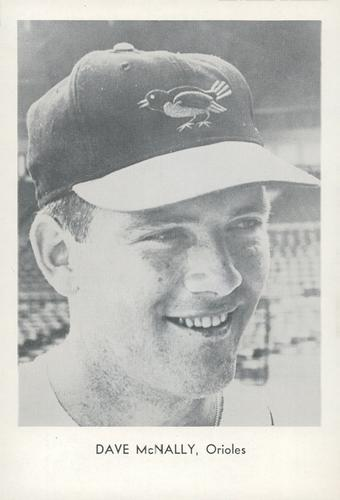
Dave McNally

In 1975, Messersmith played his third season with the Los Angeles Dodgers, while McNally played his first season with the Montreal Expos, having been traded by the Orioles in December 1974. Both players had had their 1974 contracts automatically renewed by their teams for the 1975 season, on the basis of the reserve clause. Since neither signed a contract during that option year, both asserted that they were free to sign with other teams the following season (1976). The owners disagreed, arguing that under the reserve clause the one-year contracts were perpetually renewed.

The Major League Baseball Players Association (MLBPA) filed notices of grievance on behalf of both players on October 7, 1975. Hearings were held on November 21, November 24, and December 1, before an arbitration panel composed of MLB Player Relations Committee chief negotiator John Gaherin, MLBPA executive director Marvin Miller, and Peter Seitz—the chairman and impartial arbitrator agreed upon by the opposing parties.

== Decision ==
Seitz ruled in favor of Messersmith and McNally on December 23, 1975, declaring:

The grievances of Messersmith and McNally are sustained. There is no contractual bond between these players and the Los Angeles and the Montreal clubs, respectively. Absent such a contract, their clubs had no right or power, under the Basic Agreement, the Uniform Player Contract or the Major League Rules to reserve their services for their exclusive use for any period beyond the renewal year in the contracts which these players had heretofore signed with their clubs.

Seitz's opinion further stated:

The leagues involved in these proceedings, without delay, shall take such steps as may be necessary to inform and instruct their member clubs that the provisions of Major League Rules 4-A(a) and 3(g) do not inhibit, prohibit or prevent such clubs from negotiating or dealing with respect to employment with the grievants in this case; also, that Messersmith shall be removed from the reserve list of the Los Angeles Club and McNally from the reserve or disqualified lists of the Montreal Club.

In essence, the players were free to bargain with other teams because organized baseball could maintain a player's services for only one year after expiration of the previous contract. According to Gaherin, Seitz indicated soon after he heard arguments from both sides that he was leaning toward ruling for the players.

== Aftermath ==
MLB appealed the decision to the United States district court for Western Missouri, but Seitz's ruling was upheld on February 3, 1976, by Judge John Watkins Oliver, and later by the Eighth Circuit Court of Appeals. In August, after all appeals were exhausted, the league and players' association reached an agreement allowing players with six years of major-league service to become free agents.

McNally and Messersmith were officially granted free agency on March 16, 1976. Messersmith signed with the Atlanta Braves on April 10, 1976, and went on to play in MLB through the 1979 season, completing his 12-year major-league career with 344 games pitched (295 starts) and a 130–99 win–loss record. McNally did not play professionally after 1975, having finished his 14-year major-league career with 424 games pitched (396 starts) and a 184–119 record.

== See also ==
- Eastham v. Newcastle United, a 1963 court case in England
- Koufax–Drysdale holdout, the first notable challenge by MLB players against owners in 1966, by Sandy Koufax and Don Drysdale.
- Curt Flood, MLB player and plaintiff in Flood v. Kuhn, a 1972 case decided by the U.S. Supreme Court
- Bosman ruling, a 1995 European Court of Justice decision that outlawed a similar reserve system in European football (soccer)
