= Civil investigative demand =

Discovery tool used by some US agencies

A civil investigative demand (CID) is a discovery tool used by a number of executive agencies in the United States to obtain information relevant to an investigation. By contrast with other discovery mechanisms, CIDs are typically issued before a complaint has been filed by the government in order to commence a lawsuit against the recipient of the CID. CIDs are considered a type of administrative subpoena.

== Background ==
In civil litigation, the discovery process is intended to help clarify and narrow the issues in a case in advance of trial. Parties request documents from one another in order to gather evidence, determine if a case is viable, examine what issues should be explored further, and consider what arguments they might make in court.

CIDs are unusual, as compared to civil procedure under ordinary discovery rules, for two reasons. First, they are issued before the relevant government agency has filed a complaint against the target of the demand. Ordinarily, a lawsuit must have commenced before one party can demand documents from the other party. Second, they are not reciprocal: the government can issue a CID to investigate a person before a complaint has been filed, but that person is not entitled to demand information from the government.

== Legal authorization ==
A number of state and federal statutes authorize the issuance of CIDs.

=== Antitrust law ===
Federal antitrust law authorizes the Attorney General to issue a CID "[w]henever [he or she] has reason to believe" that a person has information "relevant to a civil antitrust investigation" or to an investigation under section 3 of the International Antitrust Enforcement Assistance Act of 1994. Texas antitrust law gives the Attorney General of Texas similar authority.

=== Dodd–Frank ===
The Dodd–Frank Act gives the Consumer Financial Protection Bureau (CFPB) authority to issue civil investigative demands. Richard Cordray, a former director of the CFPB, has described CIDs as a "crucial" tool for the CFPB's enforcement operations.

=== Consumer protection law ===
State consumer protection laws known as Unfair or Deceptive Acts or Practices statutes, which prevent various kinds of unfair commercial behavior, often authorize state attorneys general to issue CIDs.

=== FARA ===
Since 1991, the National Security Division of the Department of Justice (DOJ) has intermittently requested that the Foreign Agents Registration Act (FARA) be amended to include the authority to issue CIDs under FARA. A number of proposed bills would grant DOJ this authority, but as of June 2020 none had been passed.

=== FCA and state analogues ===
The False Claims Act (FCA) authorizes the Attorney General to issue CIDs requiring the recipient to produce documents relevant to an investigation under the FCA "[w]henever [he or she] has reason to believe that any person may be in possession, custody, or control of any documentary material or information relevant to a false claims law investigation." A CID may only be served under the FCA before the Attorney General has brought an action against the target of the investigation, after which the statute requires the government to use more traditional discovery tools such as the subpoena. CIDs may be issued under the FCA at the initiative of the Attorney General or in relation to a qui tam action brought by a private relator. Courts have not imposed significant limits on the issuance of CIDs under the FCA, rendering their potential ambit quite expansive. One commentator has observed that it is "difficult[]" for a recipient to avoid complying with a CID under the FCA.

As of 2007, several state laws gave state attorneys general analogous powers to those under the FCA.

=== RICO ===
The Racketeer Influenced and Corrupt Organizations Act (RICO) authorizes CIDs. According to DOJ policy, they may be issued only with the consent of DOJ's Criminal Division.

== See also ==
- Civil law (common law)
- Subpoena

== Sources ==
- McFarland, Anthony J. (1980). "The Civil Investigative Demand: A Constitutional Analysis and Model Proposal". Vanderbilt Law Review. 33 (6): 1451–1492.
