= Baseball law =

Law regarding baseball

Baseball law refers to the various civil statutes, local ordinances, and court decisions pertaining to the game of baseball and its institutions, as distinguished from the Rules of Baseball, which are a private codification of rules governing the internal workings of baseball games.

== Nineteenth-century baseball law ==
Both the early rules (which act as the laws of the game) and the legal cases surrounding the sport impact the way baseball is played to this day. Documentation of early baseball law exists but has been rarely studied. Nonetheless its presence in legal disputes and records indicate that it was an important part of American life before 1900. In fact, references to baseball are present in 168 legal cases decided before the turn of the twentieth century.

== "Blue" laws ==
In America's past, "blue" laws prohibited business from taking place on the Sabbath. This was an issue for baseball teams who were playing for spectators on Sundays. On April 30, 1891, Tim O'Rourk and 19 others were the subject of a criminal complaint that pertained to them playing baseball for an audience of about 3,000 in Lincoln Park the previous Sunday. The case of State v. O'Rourk ensued.

It was illegal at the time for anyone over age 14 "engage in sporting" on a Sunday. The penalty for which was "a fine of $20, incarceration for 20 days, or both." The accused argued that baseball did not fall under the category of "sport" and that they were remotely located enough so as not to have offended those observing the Sabbath. The presiding judge dismissed the case on those grounds. However, Chief Justice Maxwell of the Nebraska Supreme Court disagreed.

This case showed that there was a growing class of people willing to depart from tradition and attend a baseball game on a Sunday. It also indicates that there were those who adamantly resisted such change.

== Star players ==
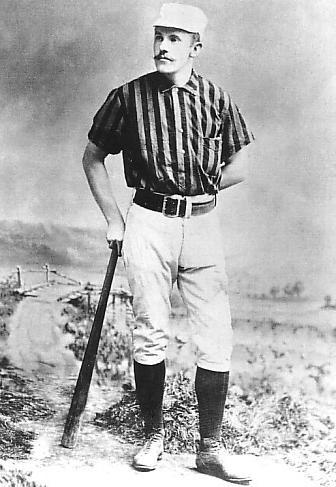
John Montgomery Ward

"Free agency" did not exist as it does today in baseball until the 1970s. Instead, players were bound to their teams by something called the "reserve clause". John "Monte" Ward was the first to oppose this in November 1889. He was a star player for the National League's New York Giants, but was also an author and lawyer.

The "reserve" clause did not specify terms of contract, salary or agreements between player and teams. A judge ultimately ruled that with such fundamental questions left unanswered, the clause could not reasonably be enforced.

This was the first case of many that ruled in favor of the individual player rather than the team. It allowed star players more choices and the ability to use competition to increase their value.

== Baseball Rule ==
In 1913 a Missouri appeals court heard Crane v. Kansas City Baseball & Exhibition Co., a tort case where a spectator at a Kansas City Blues game who had been struck and injured by a foul ball alleged the team had been negligent. But since he had chosen to sit in an unprotected area of the park, even though tickets were general admission and seats were available behind the backstop, the court held for the team per the contributory negligence and assumption of risk doctrines.

This holding was adopted by courts hearing similar cases in other states, and by the 1920s it had understood that as long as teams made enough protected seats available to meet reasonably anticipated demand, they had met their duty of reasonable care to spectators and could not be held liable for most foul ball injuries to them. Now known as the Baseball Rule, this holding remains good law in many states today, even after comparative negligence became the primary doctrine of tort law in most states. In the 21st century, it has come under increasing criticism as outdated both legally and in relation to baseball.

== "Jim Crow" ball ==
Hispanic, black and white Americans have all played baseball since the sport began. In the early days of the sport, integrated teams were not uncommon, with players of color able to play alongside their white counterparts.

However, dating back to as early as 1867, the racism of the post-Civil War era crept into the national pastime. Jim Crow laws were present from Reconstruction into the 1960s and in some instances applied directly to baseball, relegating black players to the Negro leagues while whites played in Major League Baseball. However, segregation in MLB began to end with the signing and debut of Jackie Robinson with the Brooklyn Dodgers in 1947.

== Baseball and the legal profession ==
Baseball is highly legalistic, as it is governed by an elaborate set of rules. At the professional level, a highly trained multi-judge panel of umpires must implement and interpret the rules. Offensive and defensive plays require rulings by the umpires These include when a pitch is thrown and when a ball is hit. These plays are legal rulings of the game and become part of the official record. Just like the American legal system, each umpire presides over a jurisdiction. The home plate umpire rules a fair or foul ball before it reaches a base. The first or third base umpire makes a call once the ball in play is beyond their bag. In the World Series, extra umpires are present on the field. This creates a mini-Supreme Court or superior court, which provides new pairs of eyes to scrutinize plays in the outfield.

Baseball and the Law: Cases and Materials (2016) ISBN 978-1-61163-502-7, published by Carolina Academic Press, co-authored by Louis H. Schiff and Robert M. Jarvis is considered the seminal law school casebook on baseball law.

Innumerable American lawyers and judges have played baseball – amateur or professional – since the game coalesced in the 19th century. Perhaps the iconic legal publication regarding baseball is the article "The Common Law Origins of the Infield Fly Rule", written by Philadelphia attorney William S. Stevens and published in the University of Pennsylvania Law Review in 1975.

Five of baseball's ten Commissioners of Baseball have been lawyers:

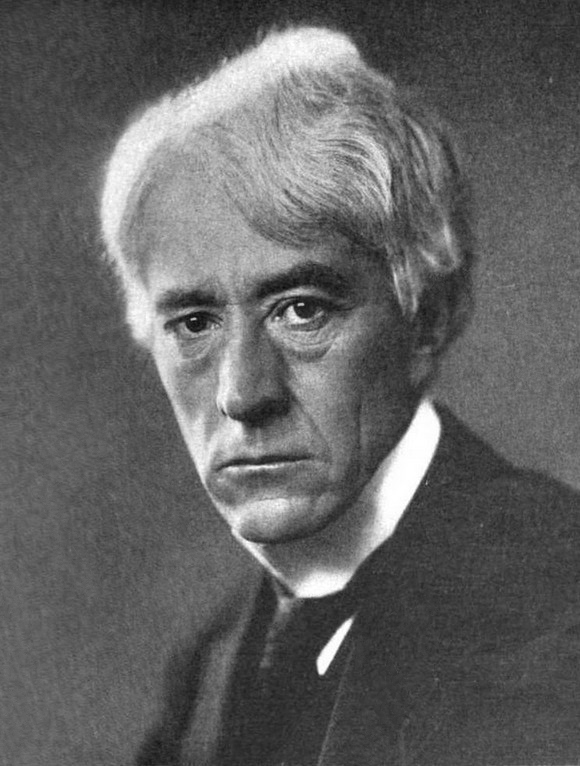
Kenesaw Mountain Landis

Name	Lifetime	Law School
Kenesaw Mountain Landis	1866–1944	Northwestern University Pritzker School of Law
Happy Chandler	1898–1991	University of Kentucky College of Law
Bowie Kuhn	1926–2007	University of Virginia School of Law
Fay Vincent	1938–2025	Yale Law School
Rob Manfred	1958–	Harvard University Law School

Major league managers who are known to have attended law school:

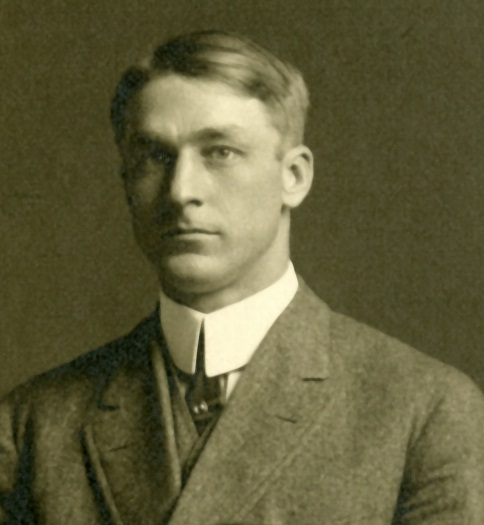
Branch Rickey

Name	Lifetime	Law School
Jim O'Rourke	1850–1919	Yale Law School
John Montgomery Ward	1860–1925	Columbia University Law School
Hughie Jennings	1869–1928	Cornell University Law School
Jack Hendricks	1875–1943	Northwestern University Law School
Miller Huggins	1878–1929	University of Cincinnati College of Law
Branch Rickey	1881–1965	University of Michigan Law School
Muddy Ruel	1896–1963	Washington University School of Law
Tony La Russa	1944–	Florida State University College of Law

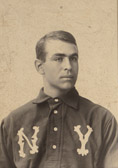
Dave Fultz

MLB players who practiced law after their playing careers:

Name	Lifetime
Robert Murray Gibson	1869–1949
Dave Fultz	1875–1959
Fred H. Brown	1879–1955
Moe Berg	1902–1972
Donn Clendenon	1935 - 2005

Attorneys in the Baseball Hall of Fame, co-authored by Louis H. Schiff and Robert M. Jarvis was published by McFarland & Company in July 2025. A complete list of the 11 attorneys in the Baseball Hall of Fame is listed on Baseball Almanac.

== Bibliography ==
=== Cases ===
- American League v. Chase, 86 Misc. 441 (N.Y. Misc. 1914) ("NY Supreme Court Opinion". Archived from the original on June 18, 2021.)
- City of Anaheim v. Angels Baseball LP (2005) ("California Court of Appeals unpublished decision" (PDF). Archived from the original (PDF) on 20 April 2007.)
- Federal Baseball Club v. National League, 259 U.S. 200 (1922)
- Flood v. Kuhn, 407 U.S. 258 (1972)
- Gardella v. Chandler, 174 F.2d 919 (2d Cir. 1949) ("Court of Appeals Opinion".)
- Metropolitan Exhibition Co. v. Ward, 9 N.Y.S. 779 (1890) ("New York Supreme Court Opinion".)
- Philadelphia Ball Club, Ltd. v. Lajoie, 202 Pa. 210 (1902) ("Pennsylvania Supreme Court Opinion".)
- Popov v. Hayashi (2002) (California Superior Court)
- Toolson v. New York Yankees, 346 U.S. 356 (1953)
- United States v. Cleveland Indians Baseball Company, 532 U.S. 200 (2001)

=== Further reading ===
- Abrams, Roger (1998). Legal Bases: Baseball And The Law. Temple University Press. ISBN 978-1566398909.
- Banner, Stuart (2013). The Baseball Trust. Oxford University Press. ISBN 978-0-19-993029-6.
- Davies, Ross E., It's No Game: The Practice and Process of the Law in Baseball, and Vice Versa (November 20, 2009). Seton Hall Journal of Sports and Entertainment Law, Vol. 20, No. 2, pp. 249–296, 2010; George Mason Law & Economics Research Paper No. 09-58. Available at SSRN: .
- Ham, Eldon L., Aside the Aside: The True Precedent of Baseball in Law: Law the Residue of Luck -- Or, Who's Not on First? Marquette Sports Law Review, Vol. 13, p. 213, 2003. Available at: .
- Jarvis, R.M. and Coleman, P. Early Baseball Law, American Journal of Legal History, Vol. 45, p. 117, 2001.
- Minan, John H.; Cole, Kevin (2009). The Little White Book of Baseball Law. ABA Book Publishing. ISBN 978-1-60442-100-2.
- Oldfather, Chad M., The Hidden Ball: A Substantive Critique of Baseball Metaphors in Judicial Opinions, Connecticut Law Review, Vol. 27, p. 17, 1994.
- Schiff, Louis H.; Jarvis, Robert M. (2016). Baseball and the Law, Cases and Materials. Carolina Academic Press. ISBN 978-1-61163-502-7.
- Silvia, Thomas V., Baseball as a Source of Judicial Thought and Construction, Michigan Bar Journal, Vol. 78, p. 1296, 1999.
- Waller, Spencer Weber; Cohen, Neil B.; Finkelman, Paul, eds. (1995). Baseball and the American Legal Mind. Garland Publishing, Inc. ISBN 0-8153-2057-4.
- Yelnosky, Michael, If You Write It, (S)He Will Come: Judicial Opinions, Metaphors, Baseball, and "The Sex Stuff", Connecticut Law Review, Vol. 28, p. 815, 1996.
- Zelinsky, Aaron S.J., The Supreme Court (of Baseball), Yale Law Journal Online, Vol 121, p. 143, 2011.
- Zollmann, Carl, Baseball Peonage, Marquette Law Review, Vol. 24, p. 139, 1940. Available at: .
