= Paul Finkelman =

American legal historian (b. 1949)

- Born: November 15, 1949 (age 77); Brooklyn, New York
- Education: Ph.D. University of Chicago 1976, MA University of Chicago 1972, BA Syracuse University 1971
- Occupations: historian, educator, author, speaker, legal scholar

Paul Finkelman (born November 15, 1949) is an American legal historian. He is the author or editor of more than 50 books on American legal and constitutional history, slavery, general American history, and baseball. He has also published more than 200 scholarly articles on these and many other subjects. From 2017 to 2021, Finkelman served as the President (2017–2021) and Chancellor (2021/2022) of Gratz College, Melrose Park, Pennsylvania, the oldest independent Jewish college in the United States.

== Education ==
Finkelman was born in Brooklyn, New York, and grew up in Watertown, where he attended public schools. He received his undergraduate degree in American studies from Syracuse University in 1971, and his master's degree and doctorate in American history from the University of Chicago in 1972 and 1976. At Chicago, he was a student of Stanley Nider Katz and John Hope Franklin and a contributor to the volume, The Facts of Reconstruction: Essays in Honor of John Hope Franklin, edited by Eric Anderson & Alfred A. Moss, Jr. (Baton Rouge: Louisiana State University Press, c.1991). Finkelman was also a Fellow in Law and Humanities at Harvard Law School, 1982–83.

== Academic positions and honors ==
Finkelman has held many positions teaching law and history including Gustavus Adolphus College, St. Peter, Minnesota (Robert E. and Susan T. Rydell Visiting Professor 2022-23), Albany Law School (President William McKinley Distinguished Professor of Law and Public Policy and Senior Fellow in the Government Law Center), University of Tulsa College of Law (Chapman Distinguished Professor of Law, 1999–2006), University of Akron School of Law (John F. Seiberling Professor, 1998–99), Cleveland-Marshall College of Law (Baker & Hostetler Visiting Professor, 1997–98), Hamline Law School (Distinguished Visiting Professor, spring 1997), University of Miami (Charlton W. Tebeau Visiting Research Professor, 1996), Chicago-Kent College of Law (fall 1995), Virginia Tech (1992–95), Brooklyn Law School, (1990–92), SUNY Binghamton (1984–1990), University of Texas (1978–84), University of Texas Law School (Spring 1982), Washington University in St. Louis (Andrew W. Mellon Faculty Fellow, 1977–78) and University of California, Irvine (1976–77).

He received fellowships from the National Endowment for the Humanities, the American Philosophical Society, the Library of Congress, Yale University, Harvard Law School, and the American Council of Learned Societies. American institutions at which he was a resident scholar include: Transylvania University, Mississippi State University, the University of Seattle School of Law, and St. Bonaventure University. In 2009, Finkelman gave the Nathan A. Huggins lectures at the W.E.B. DuBois Center at Harvard University. His 2018 book Supreme Injustice: Slavery in the Nation's Highest Court was based on these lectures. Since 2001, Finkelman has been a Distinguished Lecturer for the Organization of American Historians. He received the Joseph L. Andrews Award from American Association of Law Libraries in 1986, and in 1995, was named Historian of the Year by the Virginia Social Science Association.

Finkelman has also lectured on behalf of the U.S. State Department in Colombia, Germany, Japan, and China. He spent part of the fall 2008 semester at Osaka University in Japan, as a visiting research scholar. He was twice a fellow of the Japan Society for the Promotion of Science, resident at Nanzan University in Nagoya, Japan, in 2001 and in 2011–12.

In 2012, Finkelman was the John Hope Franklin Visiting Professor of American Legal History at Duke Law School. In spring 2014, he was the Justice Pike Hall, Jr. Visiting Professor at the Paul M. Hebert Law Center of Louisiana State University in Baton Rouge. Throughout 2014 and 2015, Finkelman was a Senior Fellow at the Penn Program on Democracy, Citizenship, and Constitutionalism at the University of Pennsylvania and a Scholar-in-Residence at the National Constitution Center. In 2015, he was appointed the Ariel F. Sallows Visiting Professor of Human Rights Law at the University of Saskatchewan College of Law. In 2017 he was the John E. Murray Visiting Professor of Law at the University of Pittsburgh School of Law. In the Fall of 2017 he held a Fulbright Chair in Human Rights and Social Justice at the University of Ottawa. In 2022-23, he was a research affiliate at the Max and Tessie Zelikovitz Centre for Jewish Studies, Carleton University, Ottawa, Canada.

From 2003 to 2006, Finkelman was President of the 1921 Tulsa Race Riot Memorial Foundation. In 2009, he was elected a member of the American Antiquarian Society. Since 2003, he has been a board member of the Gilder Lehrman Center for the Study of Slavery, Abolition, and Resistance at Yale University. Since 2001, he has been the scholar/convener of the annual scholarly conference of the U.S. Capitol Historical Society.

Finkelman was a elected a Fellow of the Royal Historical Society in May 2025.

== Expert witness and analyst ==
Called an "excellent legal historian" even by scholars who disagree with him, Finkelman was an expert witness against Alabama Supreme Court Chief Justice Roy Moore in Glassroth v. Moore, the 2002 "Ten Commandments" case. He also served as an expert witness for the plaintiff in Popov v. Hayashi (California Superior Court, 2002), which determined who owned Barry Bonds's 73rd home run ball. Professor Finkelman has also been part of amicus curiae briefs for cases related to Guantanamo Bay detainment camp, gay marriage in New York State, affirmative action, and separation of church and state. In 2013, he was the lead named amicus in briefs before the Supreme Court involving affirmative action (Schuette v. Coalition to Defend Affirmative Action) and prayer delivered at public meetings (Town of Greece v. Galloway). The U.S. Supreme Court has cited Finkelman six times, including in Justice Ruth Bader Ginsburg's majority opinion in Timbs v. Indiana (2019).

In April 2007, Finkelman appeared at Harvard Law School for a retrial of the Dred Scott v. Sandford case. He was an expert witness for Sandford. Attorney Kenneth Starr was another expert witness before the mock court of federal justices, led by U.S. Supreme Court Justice Stephen Breyer.

Finkelman has also appeared in several historical films, including Ken Burns's documentary on Thomas Jefferson (for which he was invited to the Clinton White House), and a documentary about the Barry Bonds' home run ball, Up for Grabs. Television and radio programs which have used him as an analyst have been broadcast on NPR, PBS, CNN, and ESPN. Finkelman has served on numerous editorial and advisory boards, as well as delivered more than 150 papers and lectures in the United States, and in Austria, Canada, China, Colombia (SA), France, Germany, Ireland (Eire), Israel, Italy, Japan, Switzerland, and the United Kingdom.

== Publications ==
Finkelman has published more than 50 books and hundreds of scholarly articles. His interests include slavery, race, civil rights, civil liberties, the United States Constitution and constitutional law, and baseball. Finkelman was listed as one of the ten most-cited legal historians in Brian Leiter's survey of most-cited law professors by specialty from 2000 to 2014.

Finkelman has also written numerous entries for encyclopedias and reference works. More than eighty short book reviews he has written have appeared in a wide variety of scholarly journals. His essays, op-eds and blogs have been published in The New York Times, The Washington Post,The Atlantic, Washington Monthly, Los Angeles Review of Books, Jewish Review of Books, USA Today, The Baltimore Sun, the Huffington Post, theRoot.com, and other non-scholarly avenues. Among them have been about Thomas Jefferson's relationship with slavery and several concerning the American Civil War in the Disunion section of The New York Times' The Opinionator blog. While at the SUNY Binghamton, Finkelman edited the 18-volume Articles on American Slavery, collecting nearly 400 important articles on slavery in the United States, which Garland Publishing published in 1989. Finkelman also edited The Political Lincoln: An Encyclopedia (2009), published by CQ Press, and is an advisor to the Abraham Lincoln Bicentennial Commission. He is the editor-in-chief of the book series, Routledge Historical Americans, co-editor-in-chief of Studies in Southern Legal History at the University of Georgia Press, and co-editor of Law Politics and Society in the Midwest at Ohio University Press.

His 2018 book Supreme Injustice: Slavery in the Nation’s Highest Courts, which documents the racist personal and legal practices of pre-Civil War Supreme Court Chief Justices John Marshall and Roger B. Taney and Associate Justice Joseph Story, provided evidentiary impetus for the change of name of UIC John Marshall Law School to the University of Illinois Chicago School of Law, and the change of the name Cleveland-Marshall Law School to Cleveland State University College of Law.

== Selected works ==
- An Imperfect Union: Slavery, Federalism, and Comity. University of North Carolina Press, 1981. Reprint: Lawbook Exchange, 2001.
- Slavery in the Courtroom. Library of Congress, 1985. Recipient of the 1986 Joseph L. Andrews Award from the American Association of Law Libraries. Reprint: Lawbook Exchange, 1996.
- Toward a Usable Past: Liberty Under State Constitutions. Co-editor with Stephen Gottlieb. University of Georgia Press, 1991.
- Baseball and the American Legal Mind. With Spencer Waller and Neil Cohen. Garland, 1995.
- His Soul Goes Marching On: Responses to John Brown and the Harpers Ferry Raid. Editor. University Press of Virginia, 1995.
- Dred Scott v. Sandford: A Brief History with Documents. Bedford/St. Martin's, 1997.
- Slavery and the Law. Editor. Madison House, 1997.
- Impeachable Offenses: A Documentary History from 1787 to the Present. Co-authored with Emily Van Tassel. Congressional Quarterly Press, 1998.
- Macmillan Encyclopedia of World Slavery. Co-edited with Joseph C. Miller. 2 vols. Macmillan, 1998.
- Religion and American Law: An Encyclopedia. Editor. Garland, 2000.
- The Library of Congress Civil War Desk Reference. With Margaret Wagner and Gary W. Gallagher. Simon and Schuster, 2002.
- The Pro-Slavery Origins of the Electoral College. Cardozo Law Review, 2002.
- Defending Slavery: Proslavery Thought in the Old South. Bedford/St. Martin's, 2003.
- Encyclopedia of the Harlem Renaissance. Co-edited with Cary Wintz. 2 vols. Routledge, 2005.
- Terrible Swift Sword: The Legacy of John Brown. Co-edited with Peggy A. Russo. Ohio University Press, 2005.
- A History of Michigan Law. Co-edited with Martin J. Hershock. Ohio University Press, 2006.
- Encyclopedia of African American History, 1619-1895: From the Colonial Period to the Age of Frederick Douglass. Editor-in-Chief. 3 vols. Oxford University Press, 2006.
- Congress and the Emergence of Sectionalism: From the Missouri Compromise to the Age of Jackson. Co-edited with Donald R. Kennon. Ohio University Press, 2008.
- Documents of American Constitutional and Legal History (2 vols). Co-edited with Melvin Urofsky. 3rd ed., Oxford University Press, 2008.
- Terrorism, Government, and Law: National Authority and Local Autonomy in the War on Terror. Co-edited with Susan N. Herman. Praeger Security International, 2008.
- Encyclopedia of African American History, 1896 to the Present: From the Age of Segregation to the Twenty-First Century. Editor-in-Chief. 5 vols. Oxford University Press, 2009.
- Encyclopedia of United States Indian Policy and Law. Co-edited with Tim Alan Garrison. 2 vols. CQ Press, 2009.
- The Political Lincoln: An Encyclopedia. Co-edited with Martin J. Hershock. CQ Press, 2009.
- A Brief Narrative of the Cast and Tryal of John Peter Zenger. Bedford/St. Martin's, 2010.
- Race and the Constitution: From the Philadelphia Convention to the Age of Segregation. American Historical Association, 2010.
- The Dred Scott Case: Historical and Contemporary Perspectives on Race and Law. Co-edited with David Thomas Konig and Christopher Alan Bracey. Ohio University Press, 2010.
- Millard Fillmore. Times Books, 2011.
- A March of Liberty: A Constitutional History of the United States. With Melvin I. Urofsky. 2 vols. 3rd ed., Oxford University Press, 2011.
- Constitutional Law in Context. With Michael Kent Curtis, J. Wilson Parker and Davison M. Douglas. 2 vols. 3rd ed., Carolina Academic Press, 2011.
- In the Shadow of Freedom: The Politics of Slavery in the National Capital. Co-edited with Donald R. Kennon. Ohio University Press, 2011.
- Congress and the Crisis of the 1850s. Co-edited with Donald R. Kennon. Ohio University Press, 2012.
- Justice and Legal Change on the Shores of Lake Erie: A History of the U.S. District Court for the Northern District of Ohio. Co-edited with Roberta Sue Alexander. Ohio University Press, 2012.
- Slavery and the Founders: Race and Liberty in the Age of Jefferson. 3rd ed., M.E. Sharpe, 2014.
- Lincoln, Congress, and Emancipation. Co-edited with Donald R. Kennon. Ohio University Press, 2016
- American Legal History: Cases and Materials. With Kermit L. Hall and James W. Ely, Jr. 5th ed., Oxford University Press, 2017.
- Supreme Injustice: Slavery in the Nation's Highest Court. Harvard University Press, 2018. Review
