= Louis H. Schiff =

American judge and academic

Broward County Court Judge, North Satellite Division
- In office January 7, 1997 – December 31, 2024
- Preceded by: John P. Gaudiosi (1989 - 1996)
- Succeeded by: Kathleen Angione (2025 - )

Personal details
- Born: June 3, 1955 (age 71) Brooklyn, New York, U.S.
- Spouse: Leslee Lindahl Schiff
- Relations: Fred Schiff, brother
- Children: Amber Schiff, Erik Schiff
- Parent(s): Melvin Schiff, Sally Brandes Schiff
- Education: University of Florida (B.S.); Hamline University School of Law (J.D.)
- Profession: Judge, attorney, professor, author
- Awards: Outstanding Alumnus Award (2022), Mitchell Hamline School of Law; SABR Baseball Research Award (2017), Society for American Baseball Research, for Baseball and the Law; Harvey Ford Award (2006), Conference of County Court Judges of Florida; Justice in Action Award (2006), Broward County League of Women Voters; Adult Volunteer of the Year (2005), Broward County School Board; Distinguished Alumnus Award (2000), Hamline University School of Law; Businessman of the Year (1990), Tamarac Chamber of Commerce
- Nickname: Lou

Louis H. Schiff (born June 3, 1955) is a retired American judge, attorney, professor, historian and author. He served as a Broward County Court Judge in Florida from 1997 to 2024, recognized for educational sentencing practices, judicial education and judicial leadership. Schiff is an adjunct professor at Mitchell Hamline School of Law and co-author of Baseball and the Law: Cases and Materials (2016), a seminal casebook on baseball law and Attorneys in the Baseball Hall of Fame (2025)

== Early life and education ==
Louis H. Schiff was born on June 3, 1955, in Brooklyn, New York, to Sally and Melvin Schiff. He grew up a New York Mets fan, attending their 1968 home opener at Shea Stadium, and going to games unsupervised on the Long Island Rail Road. Raised in North Bellmore, New York, he attended Sawmill Road School, Jerusalem Avenue Junior High School, and Wellington C. Mepham High School. In 1972, his family relocated to South Florida, and he graduated from North Miami Beach Senior High School in 1973, part of its inaugural class.

Schiff earned a Bachelor of Science in journalism from the University of Florida in 1977 and a Juris Doctor from Hamline University School of Law in 1980. During college, he interned with the New York Yankees’ Class A farm club in Fort Lauderdale, Florida, serving as public relations director. He declined a public relations job offer from Yankees owner George Steinbrenner to pursue law school at his parents’ urging.

== Career ==
=== Legal practice ===
After passing the Florida Bar in 1981 on his second attempt, Schiff began practicing law in Gainesville, Florida. He relocated to Broward County in 1982, establishing a private practice in Tamarac, Florida, until 1996. From 1990 to 1996, he served as a Broward County Traffic Magistrate, handling traffic-related cases. During this period, he was president of the Kiwanis Club of Tamarac and the Tamarac Chamber of Commerce.

=== Judicial career ===
Elected to the Broward County Court in 1996, unopposed after initially having an opponent, Schiff took office on January 7, 1997, serving in the North Satellite Division at the North Regional Courthouse in Deerfield Beach, Florida. Re-elected unopposed in 2000, 2006, 2012, and 2018, he presided over civil and criminal cases until retiring on December 31, 2024. Recognized for educational sentencing, he assigned traffic offenders and underage tobacco users to write essays or attend classes, a practice he presented at the National Judicial College in 2005. In 2006, USA Today Weekend featured Schiff in a front-page story for his community engagement. In 2010, 17th Judicial Circuit of Florida Chief Judge Victor Tobin tasked Schiff with studying remote interpreter use in criminal cases, making him the first Broward judge to implement this practice. In 2018, 17th Judicial Circuit of Florida Chief Judge Jack Tuter appointed him Administrative Chair of Broward County’s three satellite courthouses.

=== Leadership roles ===
From 2011 to 2012, Schiff was president of the Conference of County Court Judges of Florida, launching the “Off the Bench” program, encouraging judges to volunteer four hours monthly, aiming for 15,000 collective hours. From 2021 to 2024, he served as Associate Dean of the Florida Judicial College, training new judges in trial skills and substantive law.

== Academic work ==
=== Teaching ===
Schiff was an adjunct professor at Broward College from 2001 to 2020, teaching paralegal studies. Since 2008, he has been an adjunct professor at Mitchell Hamline School of Law, teaching courses such as “Law and Cinema: Are Lawyers Still Our Heroes” and “Law and the Business of Baseball,” the latter at CHS Field in Saint Paul, Minnesota.

=== Judicial Education ===
He has taught Florida judges since 2002 through the Conference of County Court Judges of Florida, Florida Advanced Judicial Studies, Florida Judicial College, Florida DUI/Traffic Adjudication Lab and joined the National Judicial College faculty in 2005. For the National Judicial College he has presented topics on dealing with challenging litigants; baseball law; courtroom management; older drivers; younger drivers and judicial ethics. In addition to presenting both in person and on-line programs for the NJC, Schiff has also been a guest presenter for judges in Arizona, Arkansas, California, Georgia, Michigan, Mississippi, New Mexico, North Dakota, Tennessee and Utah.

=== Publications ===
Schiff co-authored Baseball and the Law: Cases and Materials (2016) ISBN 978-1-61163-502-7, published by Carolina Academic Press, with Robert M. Jarvis, the first casebook on baseball law for law schools, earning the 2017 SABR Baseball Research Award from the Society for American Baseball Research. His articles on baseball and law have appeared in Society for American Baseball Research publications. He co-authored A Survey of Florida Baseball Cases (2015), published in 2017 by Nova Law Review with Robert M. Jarvis. Attorneys in the Baseball Hall of Fame: A Collection of Biographical Essays, ISBN 978-1476692456, was published by McFarland & Company in July 2025.

== Community involvement ==
Schiff served as president of the Kiwanis Club of Tamarac and the Tamarac Chamber of Commerce, earning the 1990 Businessman of the Year award from the latter. He volunteered as jazz band director at Sawgrass Springs Middle School for 12 years, receiving the 2005 Adult Volunteer of the Year award from Broward County Public Schools. He plays trumpet in The Pride of the Sunshine, the University of Florida Gator Band Alumni Association, and the Fort Lauderdale Symphonic Winds. Schiff serves on the board of directors of the International Women's Baseball Center.

== Personal life ==
Schiff married Leslee Lindahl on September 3, 1983, and they have two children, Amber and Erik, the latter sworn into The Florida Bar by Schiff in 2019. A Miami Marlins season ticket holder and Society for American Baseball Research member, he resides in Broward County. Schiff has appeared as a baseball historian on CBC News’ The National, discussing topics like the Shohei Ohtani gambling scandal and baseball’s cheating scandals. He is a frequently quoted in the print media and as a podcast guest on baseball and law topics.After retiring in December 2024, Schiff continues teaching judges, playing golf, traveling, and performing music. He and his wife established an endowed scholarship at Mitchell Hamline School of Law for students with financial need.

== Awards and honors ==
- Outstanding Alumnus Award, Mitchell Hamline School of Law (2022)
- SABR Baseball Research Award, Society for American Baseball Research (2017, for Baseball and the Law)
- Harvey Ford Award, Conference of County Court Judges of Florida (2006)
- Justice in Action Award, Broward County League of Women Voters (2006)
- Adult Volunteer of the Year, Broward County School Board (2005)
- Distinguished Alumnus Award, Hamline University School of Law (2000)
- Businessman of the Year, Tamarac Chamber of Commerce (1990)
