= Edward J. Normand =

Edward J. Normand is a prominent lawyer known for representing Lloyd's of London in the dispute over the extent that its insurance covered the September 11 attacks on the World Trade Center.

== Biography. ==
He grew up in Windham, New Hampshire and attended the Pinkerton Academy in Derry. In 1992, Normand graduated from the College of William and Mary magna cum laude and Phi Beta Kappa. He then clerked for Marjorie O. Rendell on the United States District Court for the Eastern District of Pennsylvania and Joseph M. McLaughlin on the United States Court of Appeals for the Second Circuit. In 1995, he received a J.D. from the University of Pennsylvania Law School, where he served as editor-in-chief of the University of Pennsylvania Law Review. He served as assistant to the Special Master to the United States Supreme Court for the controversy regarding the state sovereignty of Ellis Island. He was a partner at the law firm Boies, Schiller & Flexner. In early 2020, Normand co-founded the law firm of Roche Cyrulnik Freedman, and he currently serves as one of the firm's co-chairs.

He demonstrated a passion for the law at an early age, winning the Boston Globe’s Constitution Essay Contest while a senior in high school.

== Publications ==
- The Supreme Court, EPA and Chevron: The Uncertain Status of Deference to Agency Interpretations of Statutes, 25 Envtl. L. Rep. News & Analysis 10, 127 (March 1995)
