= The Common Law Origins of the Infield Fly Rule =

1975 iconic article in the University of Pennsylvania Law Review

"The Common Law Origins of the Infield Fly Rule" is the title of an article by William S. Stevens published in 1975 in the University of Pennsylvania Law Review analyzing the infield fly rule. The brief eight-page article has vastly surpassed its modest original context, having been cited in federal and state judicial opinions and more than 100 works of legal literature. It has been included in a number of anthologies of baseball law, and prompted copycat and parody articles. The New York Times called the article "one of the most celebrated and imitated analyses in American legal history".

== The article ==
The article was published as an "aside," without attribution (as is often the case with brief student-authored law review articles). Its author was University of Pennsylvania law student William S. Stevens, who invested his legitimate legal commentary with pseudo-gravitas ridiculing the pomposity often found in American law reviews. The article is "genuinely funny, perhaps one of the funniest pieces of true scholarship in a field dominated mostly by turgid prose and ineffective attempts at humor".

Stevens's subject was the infield fly rule, a rule of baseball added about 1895 to close a loophole which in certain circumstances gave the defensive team an unfair advantage. (Note: The infield fly rule was developed to prevent the defensive team (i.e., the team in the field) from dropping or failing to catch a pop-up in the infield on purpose with the intention of making a force-out. It potentially applies when there are less than two outs and runners occupy first and second base, or all three bases. Without the rule, players on the offensive team (i.e., the team at bat and on the bases) would, on a fly ball the umpire judges can be caught with ordinary effort by an infielder, unfairly face a baserunning dilemma which may result in a double play. For a more detailed explanation see infield fly rule.) "Mr. Stevens described the infield-fly rule as a technical remedy for sneaky behavior that would not have occurred in the days when baseball was a gentlemen’s sport played for exercise."

=== Footnotes ===
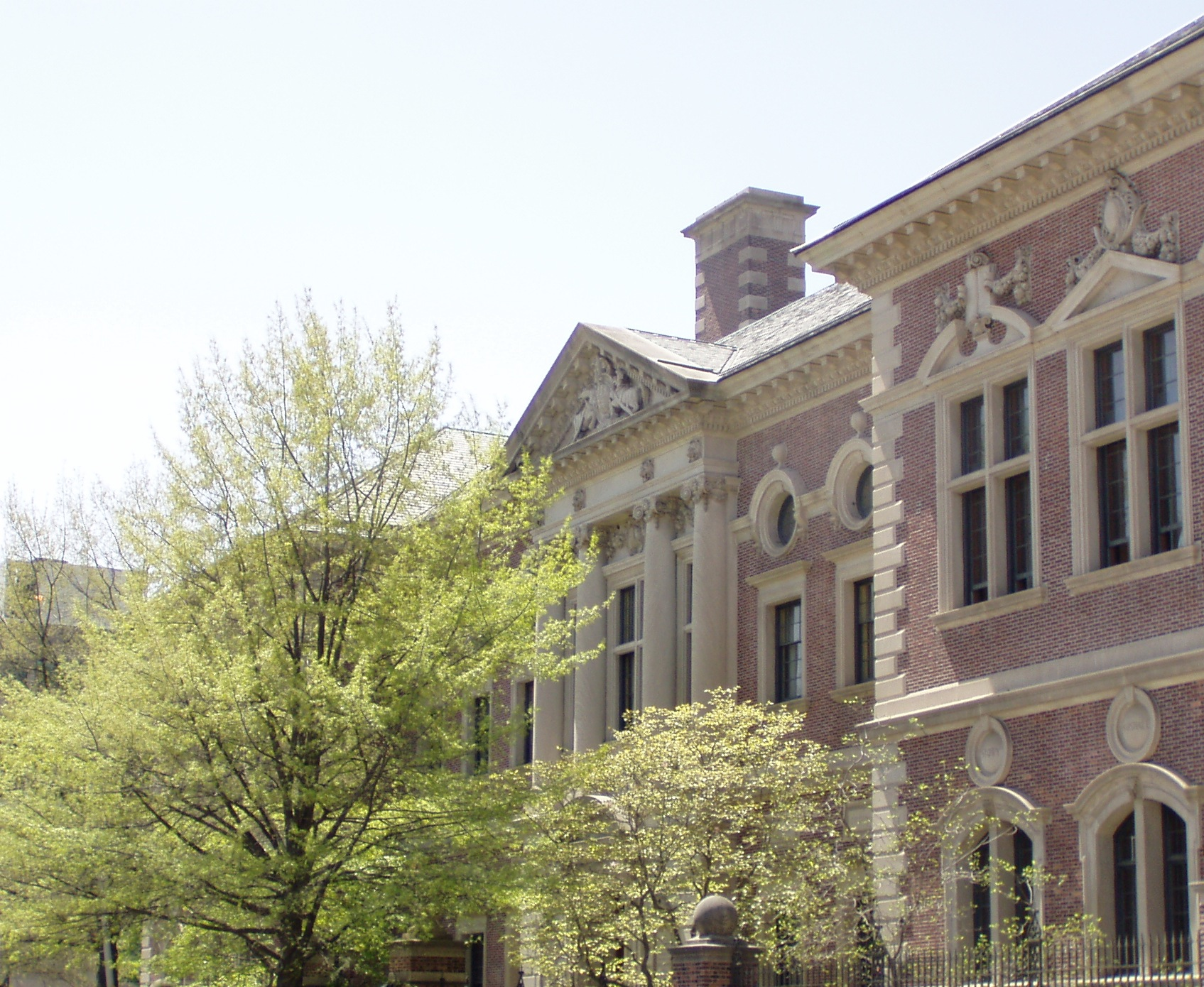
University of Pennsylvania Law School, Philadelphia

Law review articles are notoriously heavy with footnotes. Stevens offered a "raft of footnotes dropped in like legal punch lines". His sense of parody was evident from the first word of his text, "The," which he footnoted to the word's entry in the Oxford English Dictionary.^{:n.1} His second footnote recited the infield fly rule in its entirety, followed by a dry observation that "Depending upon the circumstances, other rules which may or may not apply to a particular situation include, inter alia, [the Federal Rules of Civil Procedure], Rule Against Perpetuities, and Rule of Matthew 7:12 & Luke 6:31 (Golden)."^{:n.2}

Many of the article's 48 footnotes are non-comedic, although some include such humor as:

"For a discussion of origins, see generally Scopes v. State [the so-called "Monkey Trial"]; Genesis 1:1-2:9."^{:n.6}

"Raised by this statement [that "a batter with the 'speed of an ice wagon' hit a pop fly"] is the issue of the speed of an ice wagon in both relative and absolute terms. Such inquiry is beyond the scope of this Aside."^{:n.26}

"To be contrasted with the doctrine of 'clean hands' [i.e., a doctrine in the Anglo-American system of equity] is the 'sticky fingers' doctrine." [The footnote goes on to discuss spitballs].^{:n.37}

=== Argument ===
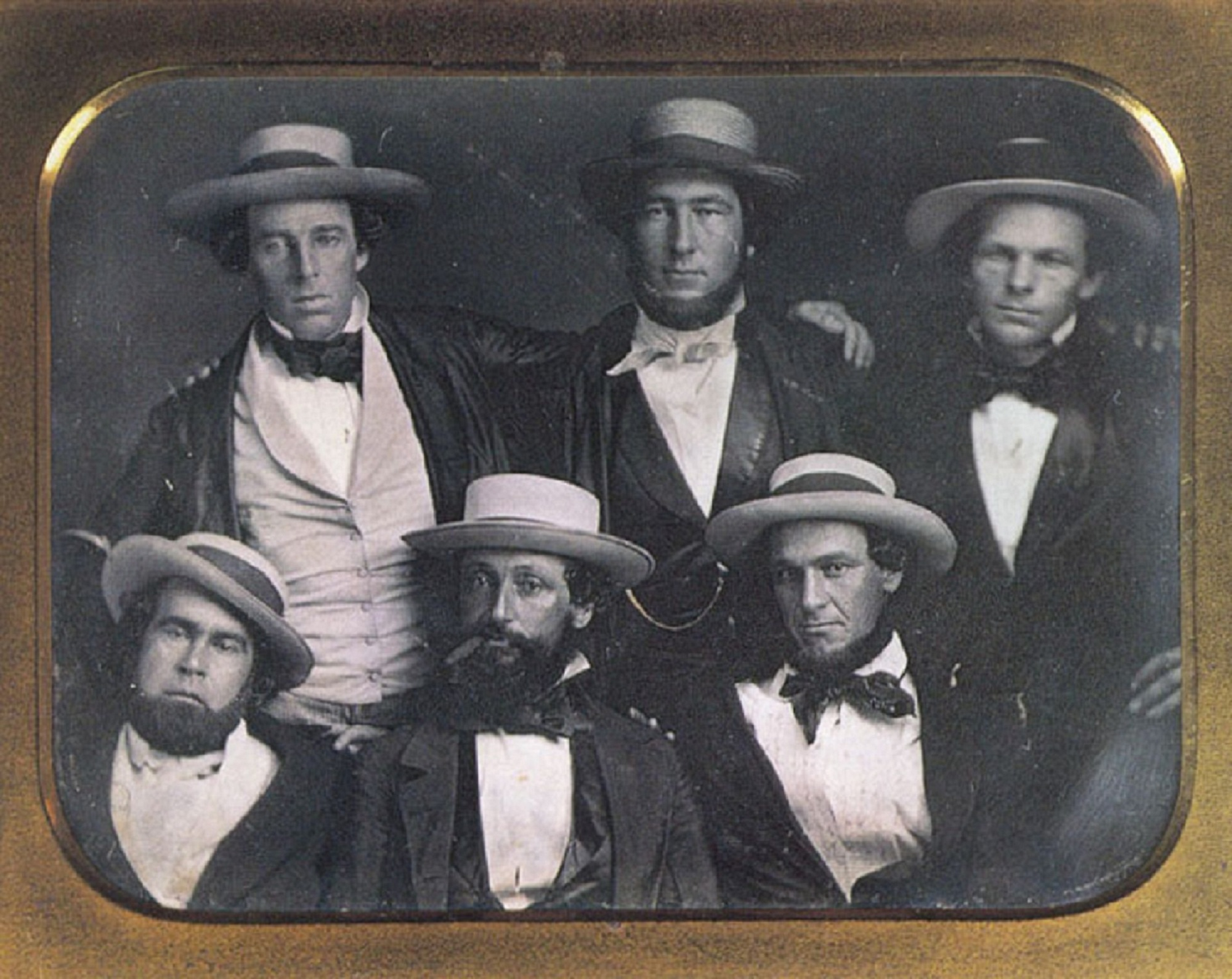
The New York Knickerbockers Baseball Club, ca. 1847

Stevens ambitiously tried to mix understated humor with serious legal comment. He explained that the article's purpose was "to examine whether the same types of forces that shaped the development of the common law also generated the Infield Fly Rule." Noting that England was the birthplace both of common law and of proto-baseball, Stevens discussed the Knickerbocker Base Ball Club, the first team using codified baseball rules, in 1845. For the club's members, the "rules which governed their contests clearly indicate that the game was to be played by gentlemen. Winning was not the objective; exercise was." As winning, however, came to be valued over exercise when the game spread beyond its gentlemanly origins, "written rules had to be made more and more specific, in order to preserve the spirit of the game."^{:1476}

Pointing out examples of dubious play from professional baseball in the 1890s that led to the infield fly rule, the article turned to its legal analogy. Stevens argued that the infield fly rule "emerged from the interplay of four factors, each of which closely resembles a major force in the development of the common law."^{:1478}

==== Stevens's Factors Behind Development of the Infield Fly Rule ====
#	Factor	Baseball Development	Legal Parallel	Note	Reference
1	Sporting Approach	Gentlemen playing a game neither use trickery nor try to profit from their unethical conduct	Due process, or justice Itself	The "gentleman's code" is the moral basis for the principle of fair play in baseball	^{:1478-9}
2	Formal and Legalistic Code of Rules	Baseball is not played only by gentlemen	Formalism of the common law writ system	Particular written rules become necessary to force those not voluntarily using fair play nonetheless to follow it	^{:1479}
3	Scope of Umpire's Powers	Umpire may make calls in situations not fitting within a particular rule	Chancellor's equity powers	There are limits to the discretionary powers of the umpire and the chancellor	^{:1479-80}
4	Piecemeal Resolution	Rules committee addressed problems as they arose	(1) Common law precedents used to make novel remedies; (2) Legal adjustments via legislation	Unlike non-common-law legal systems, issues are remedied incrementally and not through overarching reform	^{:1480}

=== Conclusion ===
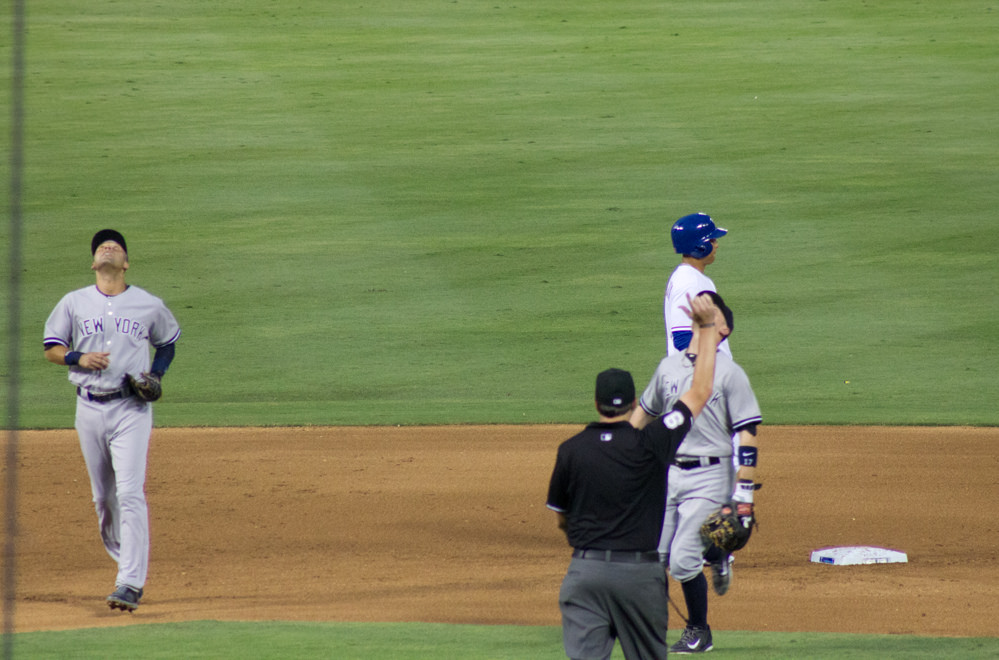
In a 2014 Major League Baseball game an umpire points to the sky while shouting "infield fly" to notify the New York Yankees's shortstop, Derek Jeter (L), the second baseman (R), and the other team's baserunners -- both verbally and by gesture -- that he has invoked the infield fly rule

Stevens concluded his article by comparing the "dynamics of the common law" and the development of "one of the most important technical rules of baseball." Both, he argued, were "essentially conservative," creating change only when a problem arose and only to the extent needed. The article ended: "Although problems are solved very slowly when this attitude prevails, the solutions that are adopted do not create many new difficulties. If the process reaps few rewards, it also runs few risks."^{:1480-81}

== Copycat articles ==
Stevens was a young law student in his twenties and neither a law professor nor experienced attorney when he wrote the article. His premise was inventive, but somewhat stretched. Nevertheless, numerous copycat articles started to appear in the legal literature soon after the article's publication in June 1975. Some applied the baseball and law theme to increasingly bizarre analogies, such as comparing the infield fly rule with the Internal Revenue Code.

Other metaphors include:

=== The Infield Fly Rule and other issues ===
Issue	Author(s)	Article	Citation
Antitrust Law	John J. Flynn	"Further Aside, A Comment on "The Common Law Origins of the Infield Fly Rule""	4 J. Contemp. L. 241 (1978)
Constitutional Law	Alan Chen	"The Ultimate Standard: Qualified Immunity in the Age of Constitutional Balancing Tests"	81 Iowa L. Rev. 261 (1995)
E-Commerce	David Beckman	"E-mail Rules to Live By"	83 A.B.A.J. 78 (1997)
Evidence	Margaret A. Berger	"Rethinking the Applicability of Evidentiary Rules at Sentencing: Of Relevant Conduct and Hearsay and the Need for an Infield Fly Rule"	5 Fed. Sent. Rep. 96 (1992)
Labor Law	R. Jake Locklear	"Arbitration in Olympic Disputes: Should Arbitrators Review the Field of Play Decisions or Officials?"	4 Tex. Rev. Ent. & Sports L. 199 (2003)
Prostitution Law	Clyde DeWitt	"The World’s Oldest Profession"	

== Judicial citations ==
Relatively few judges cite student-written law review articles in their opinions. (Note: For example, a survey of federal court opinions between 1986-1990 estimated that only between 0.74% and 1.25% of the thousands of opinions produced by federal judges at any level over that period included citations to law review works authored by law students. B. Sloan, Note, What are We Writing For? Student Works as Authority and Their Citation by the Federal Bench, 1986-1990, 61 Geo. Wash. L. Rev. 221, 230-31 (1992).) However, at least nine judicial opinions contain citations to the article. The first came quickly, in 1976, and citations have continued into the twenty-first century. Most of the diverse collection of cases seem to use the article as a vehicle to discuss fairness in the law, or the plain meaning of words. Since these themes can easily be discussed without mentioning baseball, citations of the article seem to stem from an individual judge's sense of whimsy or wish to brighten an otherwise tedious adjudication.

=== Judicial opinions citing the article ===
Year	Case	Court	Citation	Context
1976	Kessler v. Pennsylvania Nat. Mut. Cas. Ins. Co.	United States Court of Appeals for the Fifth Circuit	531 F.2d 248	Article cited in passing in a footnote to the text: "A multi-party, multi-claim, multi-court Donnybrook in which all have at one time or another lashed out against each for all or any part they could get, this Tinker-to-Evers-to-Chance ended when our suitors were put out by an infield fly."
1977	Aluminum Co. of America v. Amerola Products Corp.	United States Court of Appeals for the Third Circuit	552 F.2d 1020	Article cited in passing in a footnote to the text: "Although the game of baseball has had its memorable innings with the law over the years, this is apparently the first action in which bats rather than players have generated the litigation."
1986	In re Grand Jury Subpoena	United States District Court for the District of Massachusetts	Not reported in F. Supp. (see 1986 WL 13539)	Article cited in text discussing a Massachusetts Supreme Court rule: "The words are plain and unambiguous as written. Cf. The Common Law Origins of the Infield Fly Rule, 123 U.Pa.L.Rev. 1474, 1474 n. 1, n. 4 (1975) (defining, with proper citations to specific authority, the word “the”)."
1991	Security Union Title Ins. Co. v. Superior Court (McKaig)	California Court of Appeal	230 Cal. App. 3d 378, 281 Cal. Rptr. 348	Article cited in case involving lenders' liens on property, juxtaposing the article with a provision of the California Civil Code: "[Judges] are required to take educated guesses—at least when deciding whether a settlement is made in good faith. . . . good faith settlements that are in the “ballpark” are valid. “Ballpark” is the ideal metaphor that gives us a standard, instantly recognizable. Its relation to baseball is particularly appropriate because that quintessential American sport is based on skill, fairness, reason and pragmatism. These are all qualities that trial judges use in making an educated guess as to whether a settlement is made in good faith. The practice is both appropriate and necessary. . . . In keeping with the baseball motif, we are reminded of the infield fly rule. It, too, has its roots in the ethical and moral precept that a party, whether an infielder or litigant, will not be permitted to enjoy the fruits of his or her devious conduct. (Civ.Code, § 3517; Aside, The Common Law Origins of the Infield Fly Rule, supra, at pp. 1478–1479.)"
1994	North County Contractor's Assn. v. Touchstone Ins. Services	California Court of Appeal	27 Cal. App. 4th 1085, 33 Cal. Rptr. 2d 166	Another California "ballpark" discussion: "[The plaintiff's] allegation of wrongdoing on the part of Touchstone reminds us of the infield fly rule. It, too, has its roots in the ethical and moral precept that an infielder will not be permitted to enjoy the fruits of his or her devious conduct. (Civ. Code, § 3517; Aside, The Common Law Origins of the Infield Fly Rule, supra, 123 U.Pa. L.Rev. at pp. 1478-1479.) These precepts also apply to litigants. (Civ. Code, § 3517.)"
2004	In re Leigh	U.S. Bankruptcy Court for the District of Massachusetts	307 B.R. 324	In this bankruptcy case, the court said: "In response to an inquiry from the Court, [a litigant] maintains that his failure to continue the perfection of his security interest in the Corporate Assets should not invoke the so-called "infield fly rule." A footnote to this text cited the article in relation to the equitable doctrine of "clean hands."
2009	Hinton v. Trans Union, LLC	United States District Court for the Eastern District of Virginia	654 F. Supp. 2d 440	The court discussed an issue involving the Federal Rules of Civil Procedure, citing the article in a footnote: "In this regard, the . . . standard of civil procedure, like the Infield Fly Rule of baseball, is based on fairness, and '[f]ormalism [must be] altered to the extent necessary to achieve justice in the particular case.' William S. Stevens, The Common Law Origins of the Infield Fly Rule, 123 U. Pa. L.Rev. 1474, 1480 (1975). Thus, the Supreme Court's . . . elucidation of [a rule's] plain language, like the Infield Fly Rule's evolution in baseball, illustrates 'the way in which common law precedents are employed to mold existing remedies to new situations.' Id."
2015	Payne v. Erie Ins. Exchange	Maryland Court of Appeals	442 Md. 384, 112 A.3d 485	In this case about automobile insurance, the court cited the article in a footnote explaining another court's opinion: "The court's scholarly opinion draws an analogy to a classic double play combination of the Chicago Cubs, in which a baseball passed from shortstop Joe Tinker to second baseman Johnny Evers to first baseman Frank Chance to complete a double play. . . . [But] under our opinion, a more apt analogy in this case might be the infield fly rule, under which there would be no need for Tinker—or Evers—to get the ball to Chance to have the batter called out. Nor is there any need to belabor the analogy. More information on the infield fly rule can be found at Note, The Common Law Origins of the Infield Fly Rule, 123 U. Penn. L.Rev. 1474 (1975)."
2016	Angiotech Pharmaceuticals Inc. v. Lee	U.S. District Court for the Eastern District of Virginia	191 F. Supp. 509	In a patent case the court included this footnote: "At the same time, this argument misses the point that a qualifying method — of which there may be many — must relate to a particular product because the patent must claim "a method of using a product." 35 U.S.C. § 156(a) (emphasis added). Cf. William S. Stevens, The Common Law Origins of the Infield Fly Rule, 123 U. Pa. L. Rev. 1474, 1474 (1975) (mocking the pedantry and citation requirements of law review articles by providing a citation to the definition of the article's opening word — '[t]he')."

== Appearance in secondary legal literature ==
“Legal scholars simply cannot keep their hands off the infield fly rule — either substantively or as a metaphor." Perhaps this is because the game of baseball is popular among lawyers. Another reason could simply be borrowed from legal historian Lawrence M. Friedman, commenting in his magisterial book A History of American Law, (p. 693, 2d ed. 1985) on the ubiquity of law reviews in America: "Virtually every law school, no matter how marginal, [publishes a law] review as a matter of local pride. Somehow, all of these thousands of pages [must get] filled up with words."

== Importance and impact of the article ==
The article has been called "the most famous law student note of all time." Stevens's obituary in the New York Times contained this evaluation of the article: "It continues to be cited by courts and legal commentators. . . . It is credited with giving birth to the law and baseball movement, . . .. It made lawyers think about the law in a different way. . . . 'After Stevens, law reviews were never the same . . . It was a cultural revolution. It cannot be overstated.'” The anthology Baseball and the American Legal Mind references the article as a "classic" that "provides an excellent example of the use of baseball wisdom to inform the development of legal thought." Astonished by the fame of his short work, Stevens later said “My ego is simultaneously flattered and bruised by the notion that something I cranked out more than 25 years ago would prove to be the highlight of my professional and academic careers.”

== Bibliography ==
=== Selected cases citing the article ===
- Aluminum Co. of America v. Amerola Products Corp., 552 F.2d 1020 (3d Cir. 1977).
- Angiotech Pharmaceuticals Inc. v. Lee, 191 F. Supp. 3d 509 (E.D. Va. 2016).
- In re Grand Jury Subpoena, (Not Reported in F. Supp.) 1986 WL 13539 (D. Mass. 1986).
- Hinton v. Trans Union, LLC, 654 F. Supp. 2d 440 (E.D. Va. 2009).
- Kessler v. Pennsylvania Nat. Mut. Cas. Ins. Co., 531 F.2d 248 (5th Cir. 1976).
- In re Leigh, 307 B.R. 324 (D. Mass. 2004).
- North County Contractor's Assn. v. Touchstone Ins. Services, 27 Cal.App.4th 1085, 33 Cal. Rptr. 2d 166 (1994).
- Payne v. Erie Ins. Exchange, 442 Md. 384, 112 A.3d 485 (Ct. App. 2015).
- Security Union Title Ins. Co. v. Superior Court (McKaig), 230 Cal.App.3d 378, 281 Cal. Rptr. 348 (1991).

=== Further reading ===
- Baker, Sir John Hamilton. Introduction to English Legal History (1st ed. 1971, 2nd ed. 1979, 3rd ed. 1990, and 4th ed. 2002). ISBN 978-0406555038
- Milsom, S.F.C. Historical Foundations of the Common Law. 1981. ISBN 978-0406625038
- Ritter, Lawrence S. The Glory of Their Times: The Story of the Early Days of Baseball Told by the Men Who Played It. 2010. ISBN 978-0061994715
