= List of milestone home runs by Barry Bonds =

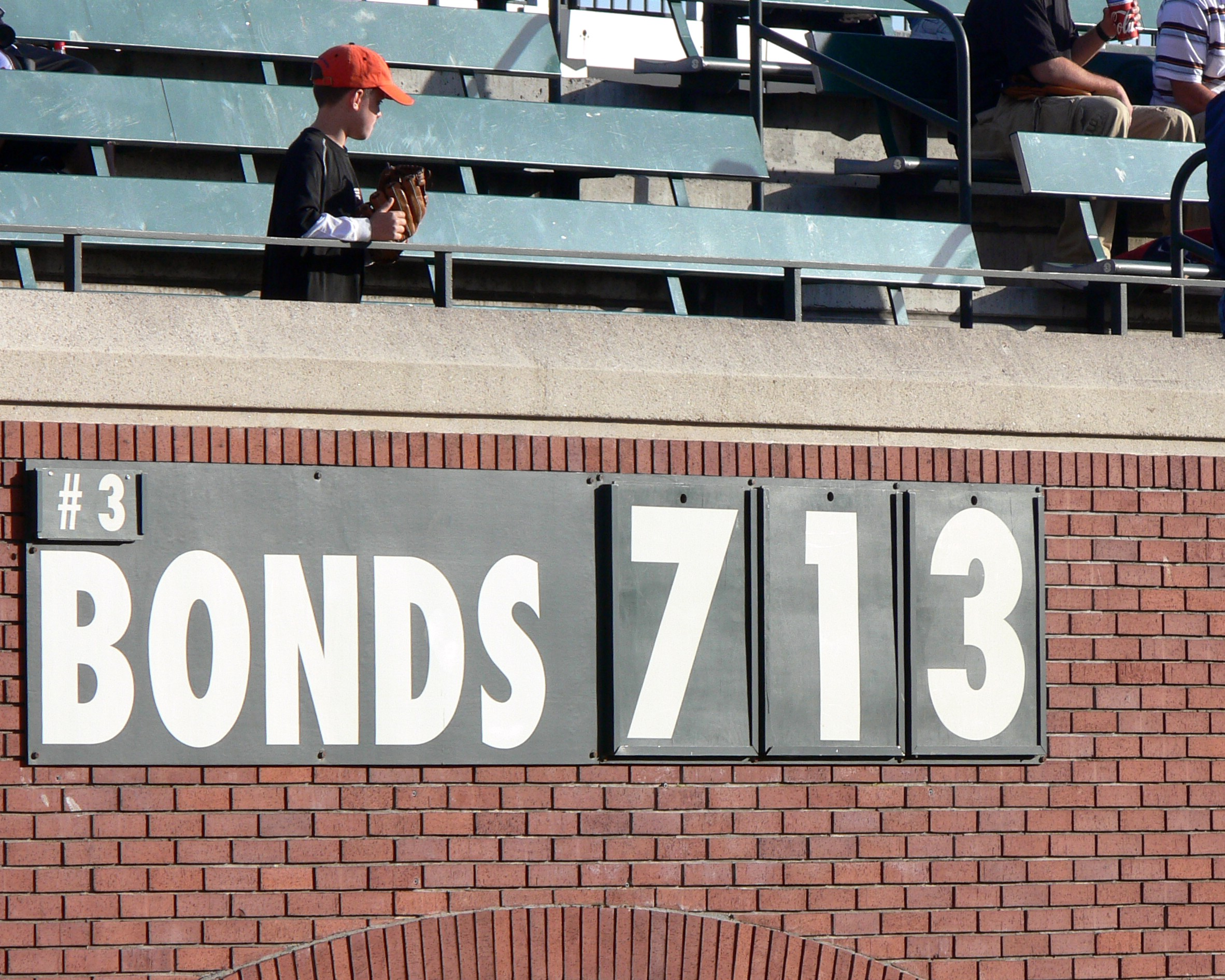
An AT&T Park sign depicting the anticipation of #714

Barry Bonds hit numerous milestone home runs during his 22 seasons in Major League Baseball with the Pittsburgh Pirates and San Francisco Giants. Bonds ranks among the greatest baseball players of all time and was for much of his career considered a five-tool player. By 1998, he was considered among the 50 greatest players of all time by The Sporting News, and after winning the National League's Most Valuable Player Award four consecutive times from 2001 to 2004, he was listed into the top 10 in the 2005 list. He currently holds numerous Major League Baseball records for home runs, bases on balls, intentional bases on balls, slugging percentage and on-base percentage, as well as a record seven regular season MVP awards.

In baseball, the home run is one of the most popular aspects of the game. Thus, the career record for home runs is among the most important and respected records in baseball. The road to this record has been closely followed and each additional home run Bonds hits extends the current record further. On August 7, 2007, Barry Bonds became the major leagues' career home run champion by hitting his 756th career home run, which surpassed Hank Aaron's total.

Quite often milestone home runs such as round hundred and career records are considered breaking news, and sports news services give coverage to countdowns on impending milestone home runs. Several of Bonds' milestone home runs were given dedicated coverage on ESPN BottomLine, with Chasing Ruth and Chasing Aaron coverage being quite extensive for the few seasons preceding the breaking of the record. Sports collectible dealers and buyers pay exorbitant sums for paraphernalia associated with such milestones. The Baseball Hall of Fame covets such paraphernalia for display. In fact, players are even sensitive to the way in which their paraphernalia is displayed. A baseball that was hit for a milestone causes such a mêlée and such hysteria that special balls have to be used to stop counterfeiting, and police escorts are necessary for those who catch such balls.

Because of Bonds' versatility even some of his early milestones were quite significant. Barry Bonds' milestone home runs have received extensive coverage since his 300th made him the fourth member of the 300–300 club which also included his godfather Willie Mays and father Bobby Bonds. His 400th home run also received national coverage, and his 400–400 feat was a motivating goal and is widely cited as a testament to his greatness. His 500th home run was part of a memorable 2001 Major League Baseball season of milestones in which he hit a record 73 home runs in a single season and surpassed many baseball legends. His 554th home run and 60th of the season sold for US$5000. His 567th and 73rd of the season sold for $500,000, which was far less than the $3 million for which Mark McGwire's 70th had been sold three years earlier. Bonds' 660th home run was more celebrated than his 661st because it put him in the same company as his own godfather on the all-time list. Bonds' 600th and 700th home runs both were widely followed and reported in the media because they placed him such elite company. Bonds' 756th home run sold for $752,467 (including a 20% commission). Below is a list of Barry Bonds' milestone home runs.

== Milestone home runs ==
HR	Date	Age	Team	Pitcher	Opponent	Venue	Score (Before, After at-bat, Final)	Situation (Inning, Out(s), # of Pitch(es),(Count))	Base runner(s)	Notes and Significance
1st	Wednesday, June 4th, 1986	21 y, 315 d	Pittsburgh Pirates	Right-handed relief pitcher (RHP) Craig McMurtry	Atlanta Braves	Fulton County Stadium	10–2; 11–2; 12–3	T5 2outs 4,(2-1)	---	Starting as center fielder, first career regular season home run, solo home run, home run on the road, and home run as a Pirate.
2nd	Friday, June 6th, 1986	21 y, 317 d	Pittsburgh Pirates	Right-handed starting pitcher (RHP) Ron Darling	New York Mets	Three Rivers Stadium	2–1; 4–1; 7–1	B5 2outs	-2-	In first game of doubleheader, second career home run. First career two-run home run, home run at home, and home run in Pittsburgh at Three Rivers Stadium.
7th	Saturday, July 5th, 1986	21 y, 346 d	Pittsburgh Pirates	Right-handed starting pitcher (RHP) Orel Hershiser	Los Angeles Dodgers	Dodger Stadium	1–0; 4–0; 5–0	T2 2outs	1-3	First career three-run home run.
16th	Tuesday, September 23rd, 1986	22 y, 61 d	Pittsburgh Pirates	Right-handed closing pitcher (RHP) Steve Bedrosian	Philadelphia Phillies	Three Rivers Stadium	4–5; 6–5; 6–5	B9 1out	1--	First career walk-off home run. 16th and last home run in rookie season.
23rd	Wednesday, June 10th, 1987	22 y, 321 d	Pittsburgh Pirates	Right-handed relief pitcher (RHP) Tim Burke	Montreal Expos	Stade Olympique	2–3; 3–3; 3–4	T8 2outs	---	First career home run starting as left fielder.
29th	Saturday, July 6th, 1987	22 y, 347 d	Pittsburgh Pirates	Right-handed relief pitcher (RHP) Jeff Robinson	San Francisco Giants	Three Rivers Stadium	4–6; 5–6; 5–7	B8 1out	---	In first game of doubleheader, first career home run starting as right fielder.
32nd	Tuesday, July 28th, 1987	23 y, 4 d	Pittsburgh Pirates	Left-handed starting pitcher (LHP) Shane Rawley	Philadelphia Phillies	Three Rivers Stadium	0–5; 2–5; 2–5	B8 2outs	1--	First career inside-the-park home run.
50th	Friday, May 13th, 1988	23 y, 294 d	Pittsburgh Pirates	Right-handed starting pitcher (RHP) Ron Robinson	Cincinnati Reds	Three Rivers Stadium	0–0; 1–0; 6–5	B1 0out 3,(1-1)	---	50th career home run.
91st	Tuesday, May 22nd, 1990	25 y, 302 d	Pittsburgh Pirates	Left-handed starting pitcher (LHP) Dan Schatzeder	Houston Astros	Astrodome	0–0; 4–0; 8–4	T3 2outs 8,(2-2)	123	91st career home run. First career grand slam.
100th	Thursday, July 12th, 1990	25 y, 353 d	Pittsburgh Pirates	Right-handed starting pitcher (RHP) Andy Benes	San Diego Padres	Three Rivers Stadium	0–0; 3–0; 4–3	B1 2outs 3,(2-0)	12-	100th career home run.
150th	Saturday, May 2nd, 1992	27 y, 283 d	Pittsburgh Pirates	Right-handed relief pitcher (RHP) Xavier Hernandez	Houston Astros	Astrodome	3–0; 6–0; 6–0	T7 2outs 4,(1-2)	1-3	150th career home run.
174th	Saturday, September 26th, 1992	28 y, 64 d	Pittsburgh Pirates	Right-handed relief pitcher (RHP) Wally Whitehurst	New York Mets	Three Rivers Stadium	6–1; 9–1; 19–2	B2 0out 5,(2-2)	--3	174th and last career home run as a Pittsburgh Pirate at home at Three Rivers Stadium.
176th	Sunday, October 4th, 1992	28 y, 72 d	Pittsburgh Pirates	Right-handed starting pitcher (RHP) Bret Saberhagen	New York Mets	Shea Stadium	1–0; 2–0; 2–0	T7 1out 4,(2-1)	---	176th and last career home run as a Pittsburgh Pirate on the road.
177th	Wednesday, April 7th, 1993	28 y, 257 d	San Francisco Giants	Left-handed starting pitcher (LHP) Rhéal Cormier	St. Louis Cardinals	Busch Stadium II	0–6; 1–6; 2–6	T7 0out 1,(0-0)	---	177th and first career home run as a Giant on the road.
200th	Thursday, July 8th, 1993	28 y, 349 d	San Francisco Giants	Right-handed relief pitcher (RHP) José DeLeón	Philadelphia Phillies	Veterans Stadium	11–1; 12–1; 13–2	T7 0out 1,(0-0)	---	200th career home run.
250th	Monday, July 18th, 1994	29 y, 359 d	San Francisco Giants	Right-handed starting pitcher (RHP) Shawn Boskie	Philadelphia Phillies	Veterans Stadium	4–0; 6–0; 7–5	T2 1out 2,(1-0)	--3	250th career home run.
300th	Saturday, April 27th, 1996	31 y, 278 d	San Francisco Giants	Right-handed starting pitcher (RHP) John Burkett	Florida Marlins	Candlestick Park	2–0; 4–0; 6–3	B3 0out 1,(0-0)	-2-	300th career home run. Becomes the fourth member of the 300–300 club.
350th	Sunday, June 22nd, 1997	32 y, 333 d	San Francisco Giants	Right-handed starting pitcher (RHP) Chan Ho Park	Los Angeles Dodgers	Candlestick Park	1–1; 2–1; 4–2	B4 0out 2,(0-1)	---	350th career home run. Becomes the first and only member to date in the 350–350 club.
400th	Sunday, August 23rd, 1998	34 y, 30 d	San Francisco Giants	Left-handed starting pitcher (LHP) Kirt Ojala	Florida Marlins	Pro Player Stadium	3–0; 4–0; 10–5	T3 1out 3,(1-1)	---	400th career home run. Becomes the first and only member to date in the 400–400 club.
450th	Saturday, April 15th, 2000	35 y, 266 d	San Francisco Giants	Right-handed starting pitcher (RHP) Todd Stottlemyre	Arizona Diamondbacks	Pacific Bell Park	0–0; 1–0; 4–7	B1 2outs 2,(0-1)	---	450th career home run.
500th	Tuesday, April 17th, 2001	36 y, 267 d	San Francisco Giants	Right-handed relief pitcher (RHP) Terry Adams	Los Angeles Dodgers	Pacific Bell Park	1–2; 3–2; 3–2	B8 0out 3,(2-0)	--3	Becomes the 17th member of the 500 home run club and fourth Giant to reach the milestone.
550th	Monday, August 27th, 2001	37 y, 34 d	San Francisco Giants	Right-handed starting pitcher (RHP) Kevin Appier	New York Mets	Shea Stadium	2–1; 3–1; 6–5	T5 0out 2,(1-0)	---	550th career home run and 56th of 2001. First player to hit 500th and 550th career home runs during the same season.
554th	Thursday, September 6th, 2001	37 y, 44 d	San Francisco Giants	Right-handed starting pitcher (RHP) Albie Lopez	Arizona Diamondbacks	Pacific Bell Park	4–2; 5–2; 9–5	B2 2outs 6,(2-2)	---	Ties Babe Ruth as the fifth member of the 60 home run club.
564th	Thursday, October 4th, 2001	37 y, 72 d	San Francisco Giants	Left-handed relief pitcher (LHP) Wilfredo Rodríguez	Houston Astros	Minute Maid Park	9–2; 10–2; 10–2	T9 0out 3,(1-1)	---	Ties Mark McGwire for first place in single season home runs and as 2nd member of the 70 home run club.
565th	Friday, October 5th, 2001	37 y, 73 d	San Francisco Giants	Right-handed starting pitcher (RHP) Chan Ho Park	Los Angeles Dodgers	Pacific Bell Park	0–5; 1–5; 10–11	B1 2outs 2,(1-0)	---	Surpasses McGwire for first place in single season home runs with 71.
567th	Sunday, October 7th, 2001	37 y, 75 d	San Francisco Giants	Right-handed starting pitcher (RHP) Dennis Springer	Los Angeles Dodgers	Pacific Bell Park	0–0; 1–0; 2–1	B1 2outs 6,(3-2)	---	Sets new single season record with 73 home runs. Ownership of ball was disputed in Popov v. Hayashi.
600th	Friday, August 9th, 2002	38 y, 16 d	San Francisco Giants	Right-handed starting pitcher (RHP) Kip Wells	Pittsburgh Pirates	Pacific Bell Park	2–4; 3–4; 3–4	B6 2outs 4,(2-1)	---	Becomes the fourth member of the 600 home run club.
650th	Tuesday, August 12th, 2003	39 y, 19 d	San Francisco Giants	Right-handed relief pitcher (RHP) David Weathers	New York Mets	Shea Stadium	3–5; 4–5; 4–5	T9 1out 7,(3-2)	---	650th career home run. Fourth player to reach the milestone.
660th	Monday, April 12th, 2004	39 y, 263 d	San Francisco Giants	Right-handed starting pitcher (RHP) Matt Kinney	Milwaukee Brewers	SBC Park	2–4; 5–4; 7–5	B5 2outs 5,(3-1)	12-	Ties Willie Mays for third place in career home runs.
661st	Tuesday, April 13th, 2004	39 y, 264 d	San Francisco Giants	Right-handed relief pitcher (RHP) Ben Ford	Milwaukee Brewers	SBC Park	3–1; 4–1; 4–2	B7 2outs 4,(1-2)	---	Surpasses Mays for third place in career home runs.
700th	Friday, September 17th, 2004	40 y, 55 d	San Francisco Giants	Right-handed starting pitcher (RHP) Jake Peavy	San Diego Padres	SBC Park	3–0; 4–0; 4–1	B3 0out 2,(0-1)	---	Becomes the third member of the 700 home run club.
714th	Saturday, May 20th, 2006	41 y, 300 d	San Francisco Giants	Left-handed starting pitcher (LHP) Brad Halsey	Oakland Athletics	McAfee Coliseum	0–1; 1–1; 4–2	T2 0out 3,(1-1)	---	Ties Ruth for second place in career home runs.
715th	Sunday, May 28th, 2006	41 y, 308 d	San Francisco Giants	Right-handed starting pitcher (RHP) Byung-hyun Kim	Colorado Rockies	AT&T Park	0–6; 2–6; 3–6	B4 0out 6,(3-2)	1--	Surpasses Ruth for second place in career home runs. Also becomes all-time home run leader among left-handed batters.
733rd	Friday, September 22nd, 2006	42 y, 60 d	San Francisco Giants	Right-handed relief pitcher (RHP) Chris Spurling	Milwaukee Brewers	Miller Park	8–10; 11–10; 12–13	T6 1out 3,(2-0)	12-	Ties Hank Aaron for first place in NL career home runs.
734th	Saturday, September 23rd, 2006	42 y, 61 d	San Francisco Giants	Left-handed starting pitcher (LHP) Chris Capuano	Milwaukee Brewers	Miller Park	1–6; 2–6; 8–10	T3 1out 2,(1-0)	---	Surpasses Aaron for first place in NL career home runs.
750th	Friday, June 29th, 2007	42 y, 340 d	San Francisco Giants	Right-handed starting pitcher (RHP) Liván Hernández	Arizona Diamondbacks	AT&T Park	2–3; 3–3; 3–4	B8 0out 6,(3-2)	---	750th career home run.
755th	Saturday, August 4th, 2007	43 y, 11 d	San Francisco Giants	Right-handed starting pitcher (RHP) Clay Hensley	San Diego Padres	Petco Park	0–1; 1–1; 2–3	T2 0out 4,(2-1)	---	Ties Aaron for first place in career home runs.
756th	Tuesday, August 7th, 2007	43 y, 14 d	San Francisco Giants	Left-handed starting pitcher (LHP) Mike Bacsik	Washington Nationals	AT&T Park	4–4; 5–4; 6–8	B5 1out 7,(3-2)	---	Surpasses Aaron for first place in career home runs.
762nd	Wednesday, September 5th, 2007	43 y, 43 d	San Francisco Giants	Right-handed starting pitcher (RHP) Ubaldo Jiménez	Colorado Rockies	Coors Field	0–0; 2–0; 5–3	T1 2outs 5,(1-2)	-2-	762nd and final career home run.

== Career home run leaders ==
Through the 2025 Major League Baseball season, the following are the career home run leaders:

All-time

1. Barry Bonds 762
2. Hank Aaron 755
3. Babe Ruth 714
4. Albert Pujols 703
5. Alex Rodriguez 696
6. Willie Mays 660

Active
40. Giancarlo Stanton 453
59. Mike Trout 404
82. Paul Goldschmidt 372

== See also ==
- Progression of the single-season MLB home run record
