= City of Anaheim v. Angels Baseball LP =

2006 civil legal case

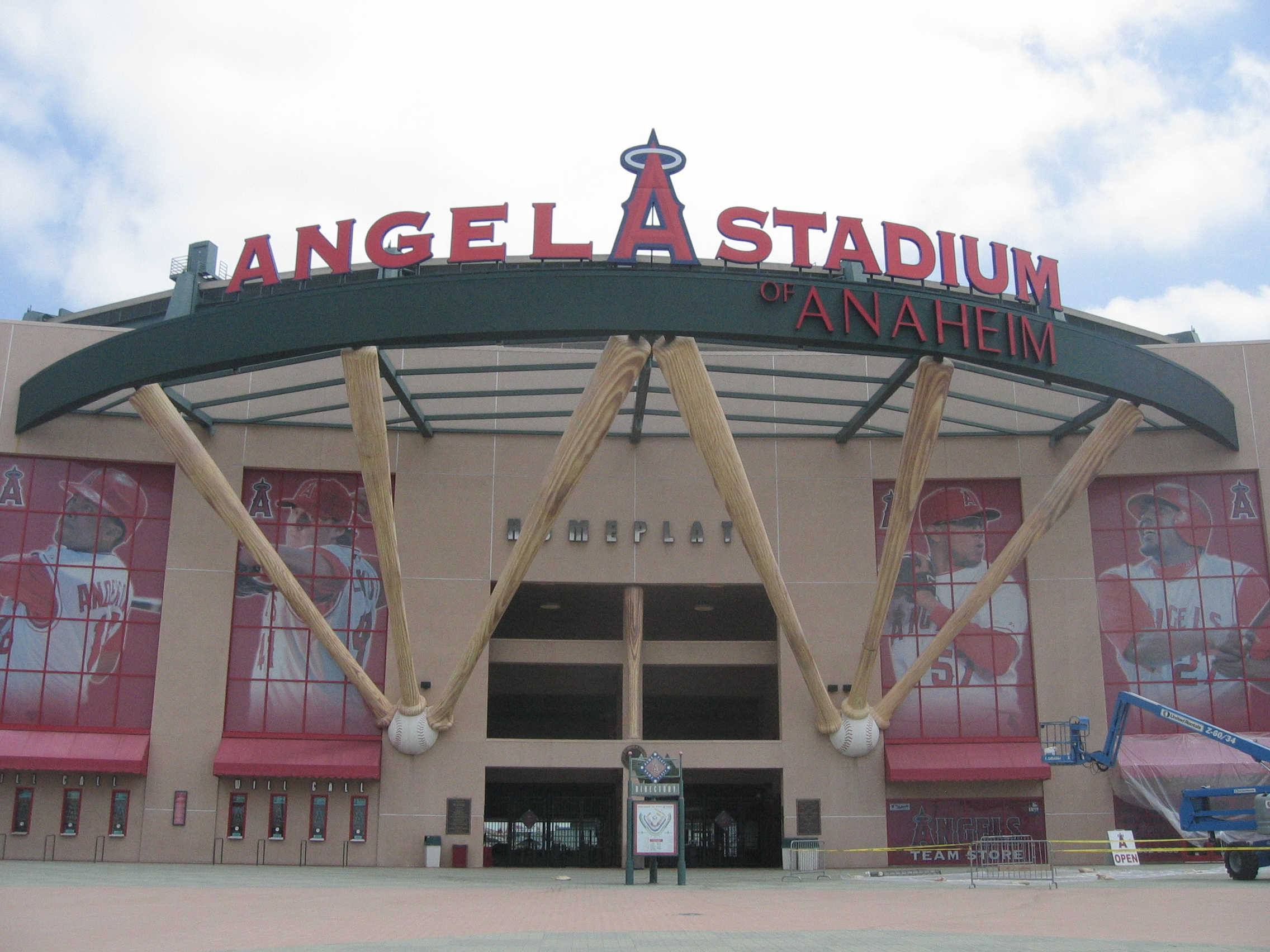
Angel Stadium of Anaheim. City of Anaheim v. Angels Baseball LP was a legal case over the terms of the team's lease of the city-owned stadium.

City of Anaheim v. Angels Baseball LP was a lawsuit filed in Orange County, California Superior Court by the city of Anaheim, California, against the owners of the Los Angeles Angels of Anaheim Major League Baseball franchise, concerning the team's official name. The lawsuit and a related political and public relations battle sought to reverse the team's official name change from Anaheim Angels to Los Angeles Angels of Anaheim, which the city characterized as a breach of the team's lease on the city-owned Angel Stadium of Anaheim. The city was unsuccessful, as both a trial jury and an appellate court ruled in the team's favor.

The Angels franchise was founded as the Los Angeles Angels in 1961 and played under that name until 1965, when it was changing its name to California Angels in preparation for its move from Los Angeles' Dodger Stadium to the new Anaheim Stadium (now Angel Stadium of Anaheim) the following year. In 1996, the Angels and the city of Anaheim agreed on a new lease that called for the city to fund renovations to Anaheim Stadium, and called for the team's name to contain the name "Anaheim." The following year, the team's official name changed again to Anaheim Angels.

In 2003, the team was sold to Arturo "Arte" Moreno. Less than two years later, the team announced it was changing its name to Los Angeles Angels of Anaheim, an attempt to market the team as being from Southern California—Major League Baseball's second-largest media market—rather than just Orange County. The "of Anaheim" phrase was included to comply with the terms of the 1996 lease. Anaheim city officials immediately denounced the change, characterizing it as a breach of the lease. Likewise, many fans denounced the change, as many Orange County residents consider Orange County to have its own identity separate from Los Angeles.

A preliminary injunction filed by the city seeking to immediately reverse the name change was unsuccessful, and the Angels began playing under the new name for the 2007 season.

== Background ==
=== Autry ownership ===
The present-day Angels franchise began play as the Los Angeles Angels in 1961. Owned by actor Gene Autry and his wife Jackie, they played their inaugural season at Wrigley Field in South Los Angeles (not to be confused with the Chicago stadium of the same name). They moved to Dodger Stadium the following season, becoming tenants of the National League's Los Angeles Dodgers for four seasons. During the 1964 season, Gene Autry struck a deal with the suburban city of Anaheim on a new stadium for the Angels. The team changed its name to California Angels late in the 1965 season, as they were the only American League team in the state at the time, and moved to the city-owned Anaheim Stadium in 1966. They would play under this moniker for over 30 seasons.

=== Anaheim name change ===
In 1996 The Walt Disney Company acquired a 25% interest in the Angels from the Autrys. The following year, the team changed its name to Anaheim Angels, the result of an agreement between the city and the team to refurbish and downsize Anaheim Stadium after the 1995 departure of the NFL's Los Angeles Rams to St. Louis. One clause of the new lease required that the team name contain the name "Anaheim" similar to the International Disney Parks, where they have the nations capital or the name of the country that the park is located imbedded to the name. There was precedent for the name "Anaheim" in a major professional sports team name, as the NHL's Mighty Ducks of Anaheim (now known as the Anaheim Ducks), also owned by Disney, were enfranchised in 1993. Disney acquired the remaining share of the team in 1999, less than a year after Gene Autry's death.

=== Moreno ownership ===
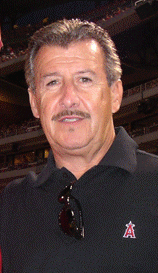
Arte Moreno

Early in the 2003 season, Disney sold the team to Arturo "Arte" Moreno, a fourth-generation Mexican American billboard magnate from Arizona. Though he vowed to keep the team in Anaheim, starting in the 2004 season, all references to Anaheim began disappearing from the Angels players' uniforms, officially licensed merchandise, web site, ticket media, and promotional materials, and were replaced with "Angels", "Angels Baseball", or the Angels' wordmark or halo insignia.

On January 3, 2005, the Angels announced that the club's official name was being changed to Los Angeles Angels of Anaheim.

In its official announcement, team spokesmen pointed out the Angels had been originally created as the American League's representative of the Greater Los Angeles area, which comprises the counties of Los Angeles, Ventura, Riverside, and San Bernardino, in addition to Orange County.

New owner Moreno believed the new name would help him market the team to the entire Southern California region rather than just Orange County, thereby tapping into Major League Baseball's second largest media market. The of Anaheim phrase was included in the official name to comply with a provision of the team's lease at Angel Stadium which requires that the team's name "include the name Anaheim therein", although it was correctly anticipated that the team would be referred to as simply the "Los Angeles Angels" by the media and the majority of the public.

At the same time they announced the name change, the Angels aggressively marketed themselves to Los Angeles, buying space on nearly 500 billboards in the area that read simply "City of ANGELS" in the team's wordmark. The Dodgers, not wanting to give up any of its market share to the Angels, countered with their own billboard campaign, featuring the slogan "LA Baseball" (with "LA" depicted in the team's insignia), and putting Los Angeles Dodgers of Los Angeles on special giveaway merchandise for Opening Day 2005.

==== Fan response ====
The name change upset some fans from Orange County who did not wish to be associated with Los Angeles. It has been claimed that a cultural divide (the "Orange Curtain") exists between Orange County and Los Angeles. Some fans suggested that Moreno, an Arizona native, did not take into account the alleged animosity between residents of the two counties when he changed the team's name. Some fans wished for either the name to stay the same, or even for an alternate rename to the "Orange County Angels." Some fans made and sold unlicensed merchandise with messages such as "We are not LA" and "Anaheim Angels of Anaheim".

== Lawsuit ==
Anaheim Mayor Curt Pringle and other city officials asserted that the name change violated the spirit of the lease clause, even if it was in technical compliance. They argued that a name change was a major bargaining chip in negotiations between the city and Disney, and that the wording of the clause was merely to allow Disney some "wiggle room" in selecting the team name (Disney chairman Michael Eisner reportedly considered naming the team the Mighty Angels of Anaheim). They further argued that the city would never have agreed to the new lease without the name change, because the new lease required that the city partially fund the stadium's renovation while reducing annual revenue for the city. Anaheim sued Angels Baseball L.P. in Orange County Superior Court, seeking monetary damages and a restoration of the Anaheim Angels name. Concurrently, city politicians boycotted the city's luxury suite at Angel Stadium, including during the Angels' 2005 playoff run, opting instead to donate game tickets in the suite to various charities. A trial, initially set for November 7, 2005, was postponed until January 9, 2006.

In addition to the lawsuit brought by the city of Anaheim, the mayors of every Orange County city, as well as the mayor of Los Angeles, signed a petition opposing the name change, while the city councils of Anaheim, Irvine, and Los Angeles adopted formal resolutions opposing the name change. The Los Angeles resolution specifically stated that the city only recognizes professional sports teams bearing the name "Los Angeles" as those whose home facilities are within the Los Angeles city limits, including the National League's Dodgers, the NBA's Lakers and Clippers, the WNBA's Sparks, the NHL's Kings, and the Arena Football League's Avengers. Disney and the city of Los Angeles filed amicus curiae papers in Orange County Superior Court supporting Anaheim's position in its lawsuit against the team.

The city also sought a preliminary injunction to immediately reverse the name change in advance of the trial, which was rejected by the superior court judge. The city appealed the judge's ruling to the Court of Appeal, Fourth District, which granted an unusual writ moving the city's case to the top of the docket and held a hearing on March 28, 2005. Though a ruling had been anticipated by April 7, 2005, the three judges of the appellate court merely urged the city and the team to work towards a settlement prior to trial. The appellate court ruled against Anaheim's request for an injunction on June 27, 2005.

The case proceeded to jury trial on January 9, 2006, and on February 9, 2006, the jury found in favor of the team, determining that the Los Angeles Angels of Anaheim name was in compliance with the lease, and thus denying the city any monetary compensation. Both citing the jury verdict finding the team in compliance and noting that his own conclusion agreed with that judgment, on March 2, 2006, the judge in the case formally denied the city's request to force the team to restore the Anaheim Angels name.

=== Appeal ===
On February 26, 2007, the city of Anaheim appealed the jury's decision, citing some testimony that it wanted to present but was not heard in the jury trial, and sought to recoup an estimated US$7 million in court costs. On December 20, 2008, a state appellate court issued a split decision denying the city's appeal and refusing to either set aside the jury's verdict or order the team to pay for the city's court costs. On January 13, 2009, Anaheim's city council voted not to further appeal the court's decisions, bringing a conclusion to the legal battle.

== Aftermath ==
Despite the legal victory, the team only used the full name on official press releases and website, and continued to market itself without direct reference to location wherever possible. Neither "Los Angeles" nor "Anaheim" appears on the team's uniforms or officially licensed merchandise or promotional materials; "Angels" or "Angels Baseball" are used instead. Major League Baseball and the national media have recognized the name change from the beginning, and team ownership correctly predicted that the national media and the general public would drop "of Anaheim" out of convenience and refer to the team as simply the "Los Angeles Angels." Prior to the 2016 season, the Angels officially dropped "of Anaheim" from their name.

Despite the prolonged legal battle, organized fan resistance to the new name subsided long before the appellate court ruling.

The name controversy and the city's suit and boycott did little to quell fan enthusiasm for the team, as Angel Stadium consistently drew over 3.3 million fans through its gates each season from 2004 to 2008. It also had little to no impact on the team's on-field performance—they won four American League West division titles over the same timespan, marking the most successful era in franchise history. The controversy also did little to negatively impact the perception of team ownership around the league, as evidenced by the Angels being selected to host the 2010 All-Star Game, with MLB Commissioner Bud Selig calling the Angels a "model franchise."

In 2007, the Angels' name change was the inspiration for the independent minor league Long Beach Armada baseball team's tongue-in-cheek name change to the Long Beach Armada of Los Angeles of California of the United States of North America Including Barrow, Alaska.

=== The "Truth in Sports Advertising Act" ===
On February 22, 2005, California state assemblyman Tom Umberg introduced a truth in advertising bill (AB 1041) in the State Assembly. If signed into law, the "Truth in Sports Advertising Act" would have required the Angels to disclose on all tickets and promotional materials that the team's home is Anaheim, not Los Angeles, unless Anaheim or Orange County exempted the franchise from the requirement. On May 16, 2005, the bill passed the California Assembly by a margin of 52–17 and was sent to the California State Senate where, on May 26, 2005, it was referred to the Business, Professions and Economic Development Committee.

State Senate hearings scheduled on June 7 and June 27, 2005, were cancelled at the request of Assemblyman Umberg. On July 11, 2005, the hearing was postponed indefinitely by the Senate committee, effectively killing the bill.

== See also ==
- Baseball law
