= Up for Grabs (film) =

2004 film by Michael Wranovics

- Directed by: Michael Wranovics
- Produced by: Michael Wranovics
- Starring: Marty Appel; Barry Bonds; Patrick Hayashi
- Cinematography: Josh Keppel
- Edited by: Dave Ciaccio
- Distributed by: Laemmle/Zeller Films
- Release date: 2004
- Running time: 88 minutes
- Country: United States
- Language: English

Up for Grabs is a 2004 comedic documentary about two men who fought over custody of a baseball. It is based on a real-life incident surrounding a record-setting Barry Bonds home run, where the ball was contested in the property law case of Popov v. Hayashi. It was directed and produced by Michael Wranovics.

== Plot ==
The ball happened to be the one hit by San Francisco Giants slugger Barry Bonds for his record-setting 73rd home run at the end of the 2001 MLB season. When the ball landed in the right-field bleachers at what was then PacBell Park (San Francisco), there was a mad scramble for the precious ball, bodies piled up on the walkway above McCovey Cove. Patrick Hayashi, who stood quietly with a sheepish grin on his face as the scrum continued, eventually held the historic ball up for a TV camera to reveal that he had possession of it. MLB and Giants security grabbed Mr. Hayashi and escorted him down to the bowels of the ballpark and authenticated his baseball as the true #73.

As Hayashi prepared to be the next Bay Area millionaire, a man named Alex Popov, owner of Smart Alec's restaurant in Berkeley, California, was complaining loudly that he had caught the ball on the fly and that Patrick had stolen the ball from him at the bottom of the pile. Video footage shot by KNTV news cameraman Josh Keppel did actually show the ball land in Popov's glove, providing the key evidence that led to a trial in San Francisco Superior Court.

While the 88-minute film does tell the story from the moment the ball leaves Barry Bonds' bat all the way through the trial and to the dramatic auction where the ball was finally sold to the highest bidder, the film is more of a satire than a serious examination of what actually happened and who ultimately deserved the ball. Inspired by the mockumentary films of Christopher Guest (Waiting for Guffman, Best in Show, etc.), Up for Grabs focuses on the characters involved rather than the event itself.

== Reception ==
On review aggregator website Rotten Tomatoes, the film holds an approval rating of 93% based on 46 reviews, with an average rating of 7.7/10.

== Awards ==
Up for Grabs won the Audience Award for Best Documentary at the 2004 Los Angeles Film Festival, plus Best Documentary at the Gen Art Film Festival (New York) and the Phoenix Film Festival. Its Rotten Tomatoes critical "Fresh" rating is 93%.

MLB Advanced Media released the DVD during the 2007 MLB season - which coincides with Barry Bonds' successful pursuit of Hank Aaron's lifetime home run record. Bonds hit his 756th career HR on August 7, 2007.

The film was nominated for the William Shatner Golden Groundhog Award for Best Underground Movie, other nominated films were Lexi Alexander's Green Street Hooligans, Neil Gaiman's and Dave McKean's MirrorMask, Rodrigo García's Nine Lives, and Opie Gets Laid.

== See also ==
- List of baseball films
