= Popov v. Hayashi =

California court case involving scope of ownership

- Court: California Superior Court
- Full case name: Alex Popov v. Patrick Hayashi
- Decided: December 18, 2002

Popov v. Hayashi (WL 31833731 Ca. Sup. Ct. 2002) was a California Superior Court case involving scope of ownership between parties and conversion regarding a valuable baseball acquired at a Major League Baseball game. The question present in this case is who has ownership of an item when one acquired it legally, but lost it due to the criminal act of another third party, allowing the other person to, by all standards, acquire the item legally.

== Background ==
On October 7, 2001, the last game of the 2001 Major League Baseball season, the San Francisco Giants faced the Los Angeles Dodgers at San Francisco's Pacific Bell Park. Giants slugger Barry Bonds was trying to add to his single season home run record he had set two days before. If Bonds hit a home run, the record-setting ball would have considerable value, estimated to be as high as $1.5 million. When he hit it, it flew into the stands and plaintiff Alex Popov was there to catch it. The ball entered his glove but he was immediately attacked by a large group of individuals, causing him to drop the ball and fall to the ground underneath a pile of persons. At that same time, defendant Patrick Hayashi was also knocked over by the same group of wrongdoers. While on the ground the ball rolled towards him and he picked it up claiming it as his own. He did not wrong Popov in any way and had acquired the ball legally. Popov believed the ball was rightfully his and, when Hayashi refused, took the case to court. The whole event was videotaped allowing all parties to view it.

== Case ==
Popov sued Hayashi for conversion, believing that once it had touched his glove the baseball became his and although Hayashi came about it legally, he still had the duty to return it to its rightful owner.

Before the baseball was hit, it was considered property of MLB and after it was hit was considered intentionally abandoned property. Under this theory, whoever comes into possession of it first is the rightful owner.

However, Hayashi had come by the ball lawfully as well. In fact, if Popov had dropped the ball without having been attacked by the group of wrongdoers, it would have still been considered abandoned property that would be acquired by whoever successfully grasped it first.

The court considered that legal possession in this instance requires successfully attaining it and the intent to possess. Popov did both of these and so, upon his losing it, it was considered his property. However, simultaneously, the court considered that his loss of it cancelled his possession of it and therefore Hayashi was in legal possession. But simply giving Hayashi the rights to it would be unfair as well, because Popov would likely have been in possession of it if he had not been attacked by the wrongdoers.

== Decision ==
The court eventually concluded that both parties had rights to the ball and neither could be deprived of it lawfully, and the best solution was an equitable division. The two of them would sell the ball and split the proceeds evenly.

For this decision the court set a new precedent of qualified pre-possessory interest allowing for both Popov to claim his property had been converted and it was still his, while also allowing Hayashi legal rights over the ball.

== Significance ==
This was such an unusual case in property law since if any of the facts were slightly different it would have completely changed the decision of the case and given complete ownership to one party over the other. If Popov had not been attacked and dropped the ball on his own accord, Hayashi would have been the legal owner. Conversely, if Hayashi had been one of the wrongdoers he would have committed wrongful conversion and the ball would legally be Popov’s property.

This case sets a precedent for similar scenarios where simple conversion of rightful property is not easy to determine. In cases where rightful ownership cannot be distinguished between parties, it is acceptable and reasonable to split the ownership evenly.

== See also ==
- Baseball law
- Up for Grabs, a film based on this incident central to this case
