= William S. Stevens =

American lawyer

William Stanley Stevens (c. 1948 – December 8, 2008) was an American lawyer best known for his June 1975 law review article The Common Law Origins of the Infield Fly Rule, which treated the development of one of baseball's most-misunderstood rules as if it were a legal matter.

== Early life and education ==
Stevens was born in Orange, New Jersey, and grew up in Millburn Township. He attended Yale University, where he earned a bachelor's degree in 1970. He served for two years as an officer in the United States Navy and was awarded a Juris Doctor degree in 1975 from the University of Pennsylvania Law School.

== Infield Fly Rule ==
The Infield Fly Rule (now covered by Major League Baseball rules 6.05e and 2.00), was adopted in the 1890s to prevent situations in which fielders could take advantage of base runners by intentionally allowing a ball to drop with runners on first and second or bases loaded and less than two outs in order to turn a double play or triple play on the base runners. In such circumstances, the Infield Fly Rule is invoked at the umpire's discretion if a fair fly ball can be caught by an infielder "with ordinary effort", and the batter is automatically out. The rule was first implemented in the short-lived Players' League in 1890 and adopted by the National League and American Association of Base Ball Clubs in 1894, applying only if a fly ball could be handled by an infielder with a runner on first base occupied and only one out, with additional changes made in subsequent years.

Stevens was fascinated by the incremental development of the rule and the way in which the rule's formal, step-by-step development mirrored the process by which the common law was created. The semi-parodic paper was thoroughly footnoted to show how the rule was needed in an era in which unseemly behavior was taking place that would not have been accepted in the sport's earlier gentlemanly age.

In addition to its sometimes-humorous commentaries on baseball, the article is a parody of the style in which law review articles are generally written, such as their sometimes overly-formal wording and their often excessive use of footnoting. The very first word of the article, "The", is supported by an unnecessary citation to the Oxford English Dictionary. The second time the word "the" appears, another footnote appears (footnote 4), which merely refers back to the first footnote. A more complex example of parody appears when the text refers to a late-19th-century baseball player who was said to have "the speed of an ice wagon," followed by a footnote stating: "Raised by this statement is the issue of the speed of an ice wagon in both relative and absolute terms. Such inquiry is beyond the scope of this Aside."

Soon after it was published, a slew of imitators were written, including Further Aside: A Comment on 'The Common Law Origins of the Infield Fly Rule', The Infield Fly Rule and the Internal Revenue Code: An Even Further Aside, Strict Constructionism and the Strike Zone, in re Brett: The Sticky Problem of Statutory Construction, and The Contribution of the Infield Fly Rule to Western Civilization (and Vice Versa). His paper has been referenced in legal articles covering bankruptcy, constitutional law and ethics.

== Career ==
Stevens worked for a number of law firms in the Philadelphia area and became assistant director of the American Law Institute and of the American Bar Association's Continuing Legal Education program. After retiring in September 2008, he accepted a one-year assignment as the acting director of the continuing education program of the Alaska Bar Association.

Stevens wrote numerous articles during his legal career, including work for The Philadelphia Lawyer, but none achieved the renown of his Infield Fly Rule note.

A resident of Narberth, Pennsylvania, Stevens died at age 60 on December 8, 2008, of a heart attack while working in Anchorage, Alaska.
