= University of Pennsylvania Law Review =

- Discipline: Law review
- Language: English
- Edited by: Ecclesiaste Desir

Publication details
- Former names: American Law Register, American Law Register and Review, University of Pennsylvania Law Review and American Law Register
- History: 1852-present
- Publisher: University of Pennsylvania Law School (United States)
- Frequency: 7/year (monthly from December to June)
- Impact factor: 5.231 (2018)

Standard abbreviations
- Bluebook: U. Pa. L. Rev.
- ISO 4: Univ. Pa. Law Rev.

Indexing
- ISSN: 0041-9907 (print); 1942-8537 (web)
- LCCN: 75649838
- OCLC no.: 02359920

Links
- Journal homepage

The University of Pennsylvania Law Review, formerly known as the American Law Register, is a law review published by an organization of second and third year J.D. students at the University of Pennsylvania Law School. It is the oldest law journal in the United States, having been published continuously since 1852. Currently, seven issues are published each year with the last issue traditionally featuring papers from symposia held by the review each year. It is one of the four law reviews responsible for publication of the Bluebook. It is one of seven official scholarly journals at the University of Pennsylvania Law School, and was the third most cited law journal in the world in 2006.

In addition to the print edition, the University of Pennsylvania Law Review also publishes the University of Pennsylvania Law Review Online, formerly named PENNumbra, an online supplement, which publishes debates, essays, case notes, and responses to articles that appeared in the print edition.

== History ==
The journal was founded as the American Law Register, and was originally written, edited, and published by practitioners, but soon expanded its pool of editors and contributors to also include judges and law professors. In 1892, under the leadership of William Draper Lewis and George Wharton Pepper, it changed its name to the American Law Register and Review. In 1895, Lewis became the first full-time dean of the University of Pennsylvania Law School and had the Law School take over the journal. The 1896 volume was the first volume to be edited by law students. The journal changed its name in 1908 to the University of Pennsylvania Law Review and American Law Register, and adopted its current name in 1945.

In addition to publishing numerous influential works of scholarship, the law review has famously published a series of humorous "asides." The most well known is The Common Law Origins of the Infield Fly Rule, 123 U. Pa. L. Rev. 1474 (1975).

== Membership selection ==
Positions on the University of Pennsylvania Law Review are filled based in part on students' grades during first year of law school and in part on students' performance during a writing competition conducted at the end of each school year. The writing competition has two major parts: an editing portion and a writing portion. During the 16-hour editing portion, contestants are required to correct a sample portion of a fake law review article prepared by the current board. Contestants have at their disposal a copy of the Bluebook and a packet of source materials provided by the review. During the writing portion, contestants are required to create a cohesive, thesis-driven essay using only the set of sources provided. The sources cover a variety of topics, and the essay does not need to be law-related. Additionally, contestants are asked to submit a short personal statement. Each year the review takes approximately 55 new members from the rising second-year class, including transfer students. The University of Pennsylvania Law Review is managed by a board of 20 members chosen from the rising 3L class in February of each year.

== Notable alumni ==
Prominent alumni of the University of Pennsylvania Law Review include

- William Draper Lewis
- George W. Pepper
- Philip Werner Amram
- Sadie T. M. Alexander
- Thomas K. Finletter
- Natalie Wexler
- Loftus Becker
- Owen Roberts
- Curtis Reitz
- Earl G. Harrison
- Peter J. Liacouras
- Edward J. Normand
- Jerome B. Simandle
- Dolores Sloviter
- Marci Hamilton
- A. Raymond Randolph
- Mark G. Yudof
- Daniel Garodnick
- Kit Kinports
- Charles A. Heimbold Jr.
- Tom Ellis
- Patty Shwartz
- Rudolph Contreras
- Leo E. Strine Jr.
- Louis E. Levinthal

== Selected articles ==
- James T. Ringgold, Sunday Laws in the United States, 40 Am. L. Reg. 723 (1892)
- William J. Marbury, The Proposed Woman Suffrage Amendment and the Amending Power, 65 U. Pa. L. Rev. 403 (1917)
- Francis H. Bohlen, The Duty of a Landowner Toward Those Entering His Premises of Their Own Right, 69 U. Pa. L. Rev. 237 (1921)
- Margaret Center Klinglesmith, Amending the Constitution of the United States, 73 U. Pa. L. Rev. 48 (1925)
- Robert von Moschzisker, Equity Jurisdiction in the Federal Courts, 75 U. Pa. L. Rev. 287 (1927)
- Ernest G. Black, Torture Under English Law, 75 U. Pa. L. Rev. 344 (1927)
- Alpheus Thomas Mason, Politics and the Supreme Court: President Roosevelt's Proposal, 85 Pa. L. Rev. 659 (1937)
- Charles Cheney Hyde, International Co-operation for Neutrality, 85 Pa. L. Rev. 344 (1937)
- Anthony G. Amsterdam, Note, The Void-For-Vagueness Doctrine in the Supreme Court, 109 U. Pa. L. Rev. 67 (1960)
- Arthur Allen Leff, Unconscionability and the Code-The Emperor's New Clause, 115 U. Pa. L. Rev. 485 (1967)
- Herbert M. Silverberg, Law School Legal Aid Clinics: A Sample Plan; Their Legal Status, 117 U. Pa. L. Rev. 970 (1969)
- Harold Leventhal, Environmental Decisionmaking and the Role of the Courts, 122 U. Pa. L. Rev. 509 (1974)
- Marvin E. Frankel, The Search for Truth: An Umpireal View, 123 U. Pa. L. Rev. 1031 (1975)
- Henry Friendly, "Some Kind of Hearing", 123 U. Pa. L. Rev. 1267 (1975)
- Aside, The Common Law Origins of the Infield Fly Rule, 123 U. Pa. L. Rev. 1474 (1975) (Will Stevens authored the piece anonymously)
- Michael J. Perry, The Disproportionate Impact Theory of Racial Discrimination, 125 U. Pa. L. Rev. 540 (1970)
- David D. Cole, Playing by Pornography's Rules: The Regulation of Sexual Expression, 143 U. Pa. L. Rev. 111 (1994)
- David Nimmer, A Riff on Fair Use in the Digital Millennium Copyright Act, 148 U. Pa. L. Rev. 673 (2000)
- Elizabeth S. Anderson & Richard Pildes, Expressive Theories of Law: A General Restatement, 148 U. Pa. L. Rev. 1503 (2000)
- Cass Sunstein, Beyond the Precautionary Principle 151 U. Pa. L. Rev. 1003 (2003)
- William Baude & Michael Stokes Paulsen, The Sweep and Force of Section Three, 172 U. Pa. L. Rev. 605 (2024)
