= List of National Hockey League attendance figures =

The National Hockey League is one of the top attended professional sports in the world, as well as one of the top two attended indoor sports in both average and total attendance. As of the 2018–19 season the NHL averaged 18,250 live spectators per game, and 22,002,081 total for the season.

== Season leaders ==
Year	Team	Arena	Home games	Average attendance	Total attendance	Capacity percentage
2000–01	Montreal Canadiens	Bell Centre	41	20,105	824,308	94.5%
2001–02	Detroit Red Wings	Joe Louis Arena	41	20,058	822,378	100.0%
2002–03	Montreal Canadiens	Bell Centre	41	20,672	847,586	97.2%
2003–04	Montreal Canadiens	Bell Centre	41	20,555	842,767	96.6%
2004–05	No season due to 2004–05 NHL lockout					
2005-06	Montreal Canadiens	Bell Centre	41	21,273	872,194	100.0%
2006–07	Montreal Canadiens	Bell Centre	41	21,273	872,193	100.0%
2007–08	Montreal Canadiens	Bell Centre	41	21,273	872,193	100.0%
2008–09	Chicago Blackhawks	United Center	41	22,247	912,155	111.2%
2009–10	Chicago Blackhawks	United Center	40	21,356	854,267	108.3%
2010–11	Chicago Blackhawks	United Center	41	21,423	878,356	108.7%
2011–12	Chicago Blackhawks	United Center	41	21,533	882,874	109.2%
2012–13	Chicago Blackhawks	United Center	24	21,755	522,619	110.4%
2013–14	Chicago Blackhawks	United Center	41	22,623	927,545	117.6%
2014–15	Chicago Blackhawks	United Center	41	21,769	892,532	110.4%
2015–16	Chicago Blackhawks	United Center	41	22,859	896,240	110.9%
2016–17	Chicago Blackhawks	United Center	41	21,751	891,827	110.3%
2017–18	Chicago Blackhawks	United Center	41	21,653	887,794	109.8%
2018–19	Chicago Blackhawks	United Center	40	21,399	855,972	108.5%
2019–20	Chicago Blackhawks	United Center	34	21,441	729,000	108.7%
2020–21 (Note: Attendance capacity partially reduced due to government COVID-19 restrictions)	Dallas Stars	American Airlines Center	28	4,341	121,534	23.4%
2021–22	Tampa Bay Lightning	Amalie Arena	41	19,092	782,772	100.0%
2022–23	Montreal Canadiens	Bell Centre	41	21,078	864,180	99.9%
2023–24	Montreal Canadiens	Bell Centre	41	21,099	865,074	99.9%

== Attendance statistics by season ==
=== 2009–10 ===
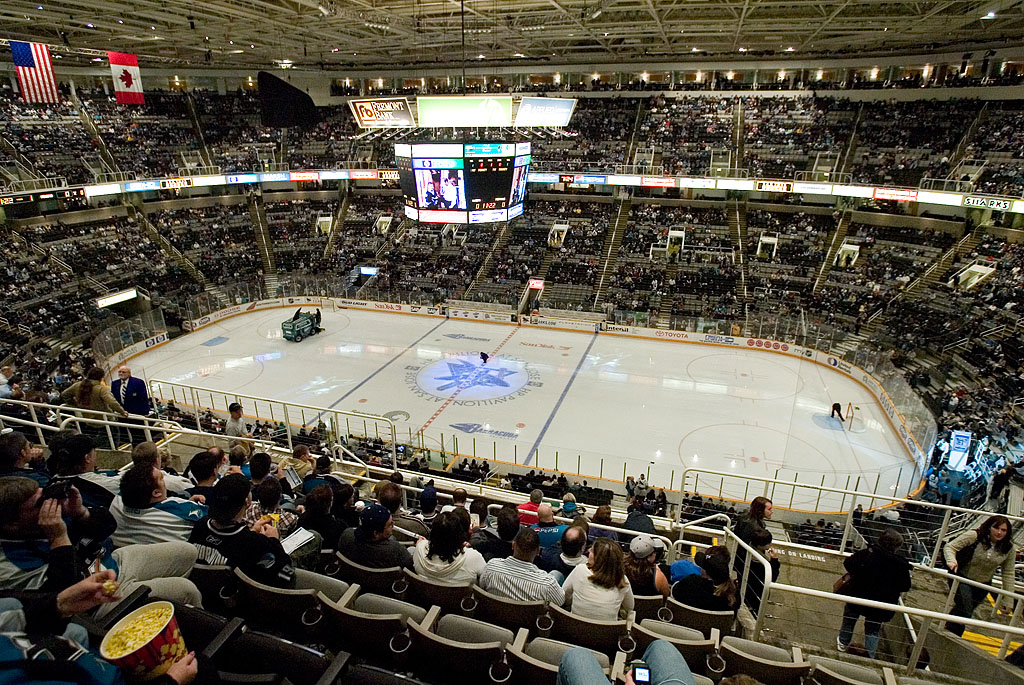
HP Pavilion

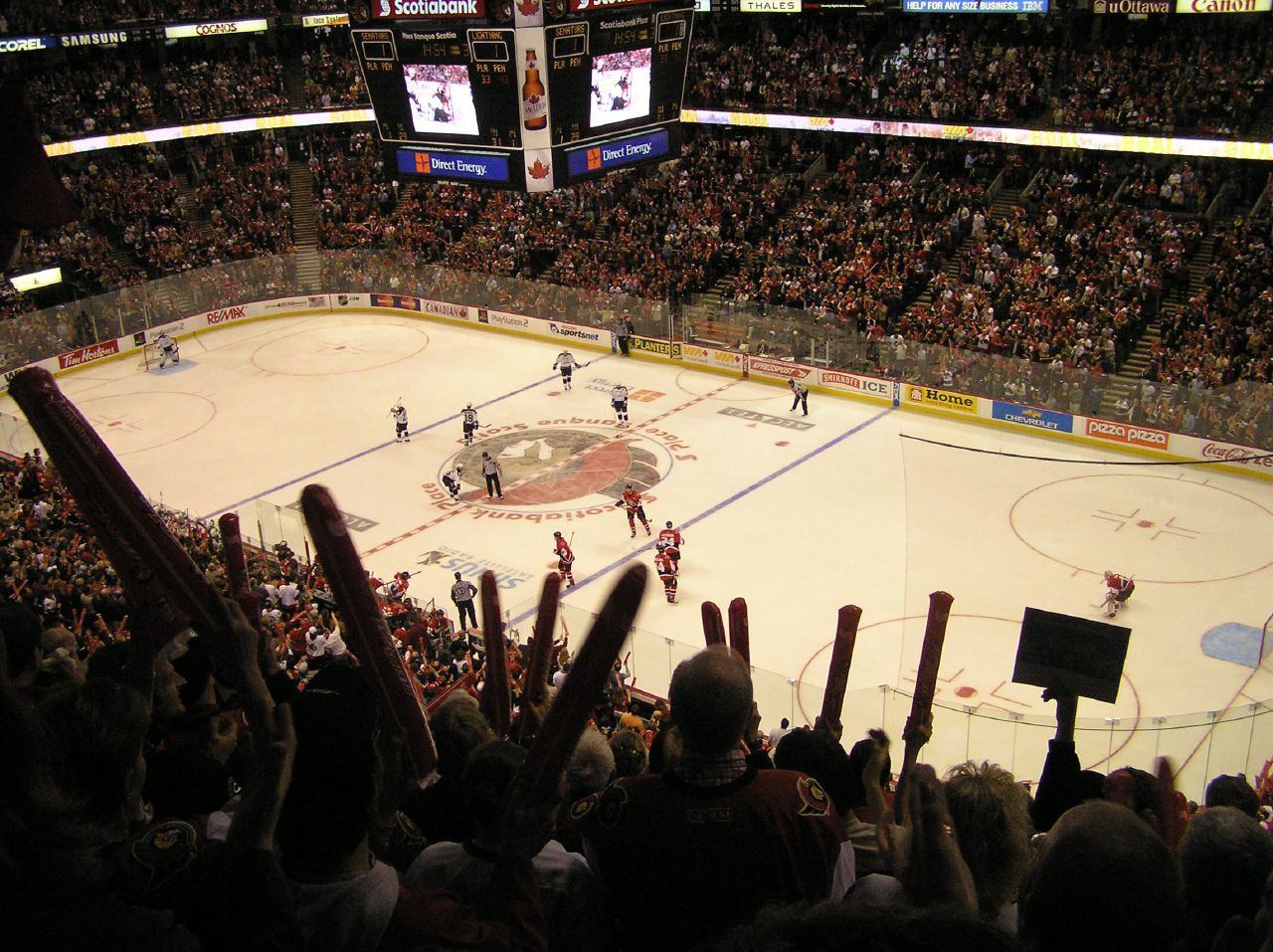
Scotiabank Place

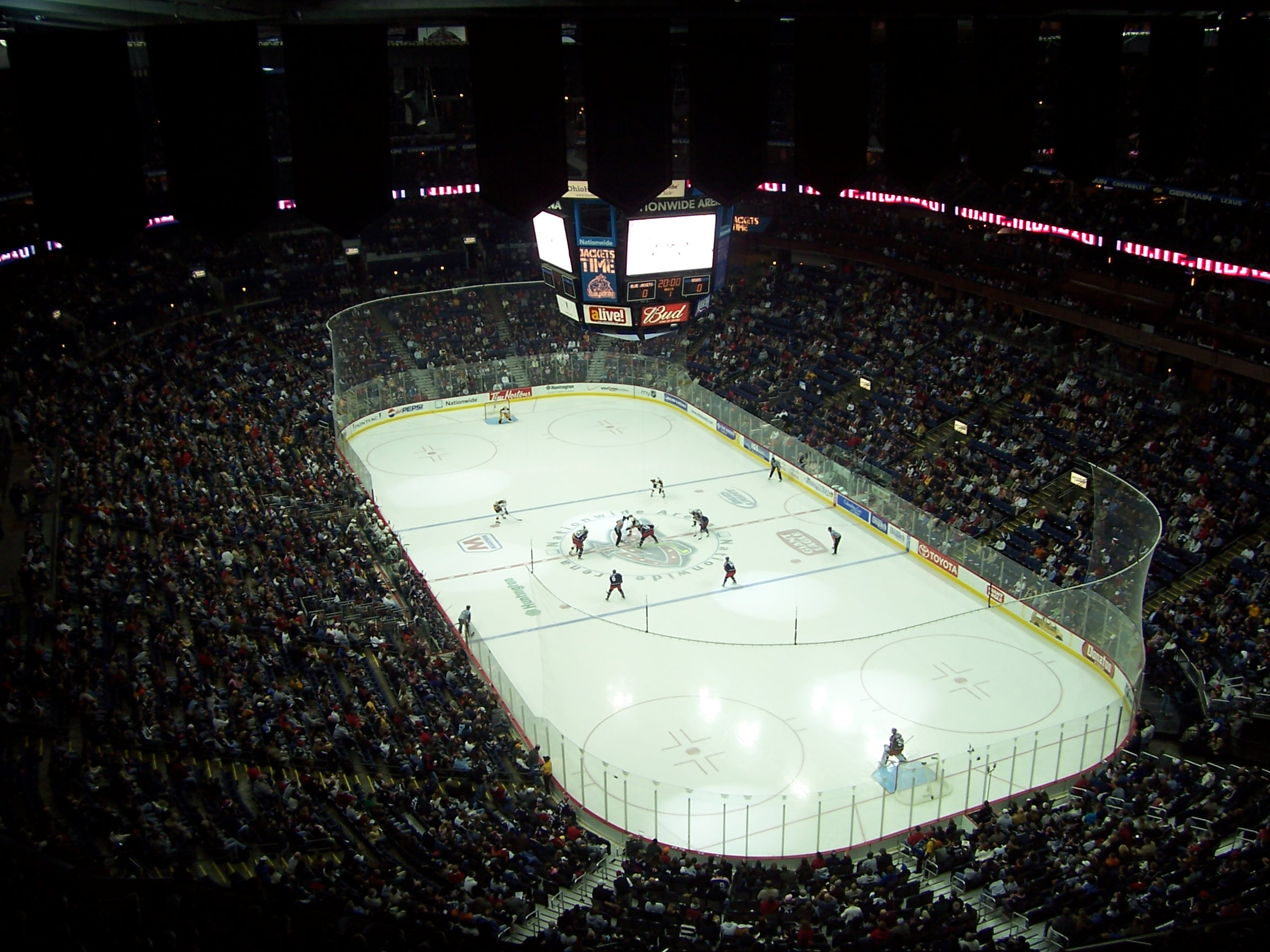
Nationwide Arena

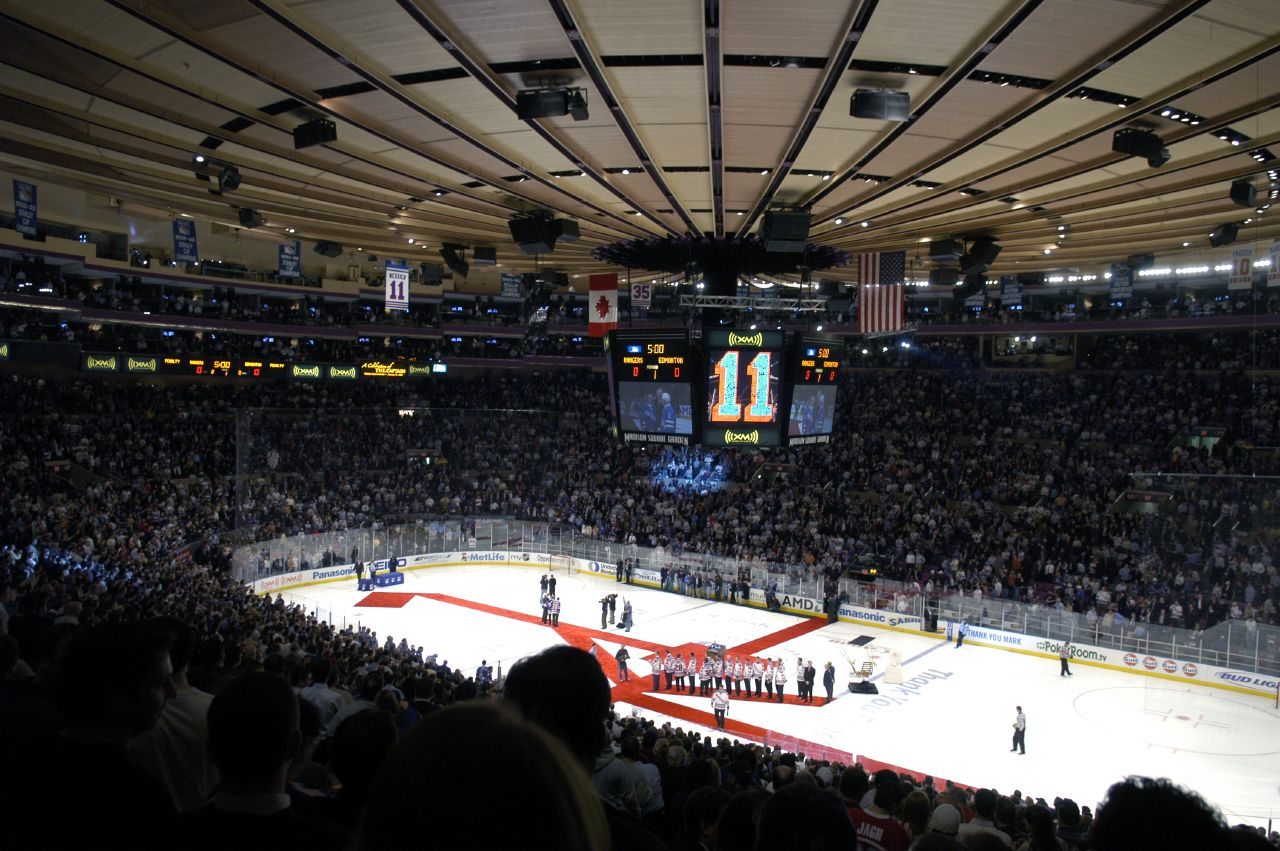
Madison Square Garden

Team	Arena	Home Games	Average Attendance	Total Attendance	Capacity Percentage
Montreal Canadiens	Bell Centre	41	21,273	872,193	100.0%
Chicago Blackhawks	United Center	40	21,356	854,267	108.3%
Detroit Red Wings	Joe Louis Arena	40	19,535	800,966	97.4%
Calgary Flames	Pengrowth Saddledome	41	19,289	790,849	100.0%
Toronto Maple Leafs	Air Canada Centre	41	19,260	789,681	102.5%
Philadelphia Flyers	Wachovia Center	41	19,546	781,847	100.2%
Vancouver Canucks	GM Place	41	18,810	771,210	102.1%
Buffalo Sabres	HSBC Arena	41	18,529	759,695	99.1%
St. Louis Blues	Scottrade Center	40	18,883	755,322	98.6%
Minnesota Wild	Xcel Energy Center	41	18,415	755,055	101.9%
Washington Capitals	Verizon Center	41	18,277	749,357	100.0%
Ottawa Senators	Scotiabank Place	41	18,269	749,061	98.8%
New York Rangers	Madison Square Garden	41	18,076	741,128	99.3%
San Jose Sharks	HP Pavilion at San Jose	41	17,558	719,904	100.4%
Los Angeles Kings	Staples Center	41	17,313	709,853	93.6%
Dallas Stars	American Airlines Center	41	17,215	705,817	92.9%
Pittsburgh Penguins	Mellon Arena	41	17,078	700,211	100.7%
Boston Bruins	TD Garden	41	17,388	695,543	99.0%
Edmonton Oilers	Rexall Place	41	16,839	690,399	100.0%
New Jersey Devils	Prudential Center	41	15,535	636,975	88.1%
Tampa Bay Lightning	St. Pete Times Forum	41	15,497	635,388	78.4%
Columbus Blue Jackets	Nationwide Arena	41	15,416	632,086	85.0%
Carolina Hurricanes	RBC Center	41	15,240	624,873	81.4%
Anaheim Ducks	Honda Center	41	15,168	621,903	88.3%
Nashville Predators	Bridgestone Arena	41	14,979	614,143	87.5%
Florida Panthers	BankAtlantic Center	40	15,146	605,863	78.7%
Colorado Avalanche	Pepsi Center	41	13,947	571,849	77.5%
Atlanta Thrashers	Philips Arena	41	13,607	557,897	73.4%
New York Islanders	Nassau Veterans Memorial Coliseum	41	12,735	522,168	78.1%
Phoenix Coyotes	Jobing.com Arena	41	11,989	491,558	68.5%

Notes:

- Totals do not include two regular-season opening games played in Europe. The Detroit Red Wings played the St. Louis Blues at the Ericsson Globe in Stockholm, Sweden, and the Chicago Blackhawks played the Florida Panthers at Hartwall Areena in Helsinki, Finland.
- The Pittsburgh Penguins began play in their new arena (Consol Energy Center) on Wednesday, September 22, 2010. With a larger capacity, more luxury seating, and better amenities than their former home Mellon Arena, the Penguins are expected to have a larger average and overall attendance record in the 2010–11 season.
- As of July 6, 2010, Vancouver's GM Place was renamed Rogers Arena.

=== 2010–11 ===
Team	Arena	Home Games	Average Attendance	Total Attendance	Capacity Percentage
Chicago Blackhawks	United Center	41	21,423	878,356	108.7%
Montreal Canadiens	Bell Centre	41	21,273	872,193	100.0%
Philadelphia Flyers	Wells Fargo Center	41	19,715	808,328	101.1%
Detroit Red Wings	Joe Louis Arena	41	19,680	806,892	98.1%
Toronto Maple Leafs	Air Canada Centre	41	19,354	793,522	102.9%
Calgary Flames	Scotiabank Saddledome	40	19,289	771,560	100.0%
St. Louis Blues	Scottrade Center	41	19,150	785,150	100.0%
Vancouver Canucks	Rogers Arena	41	18,860	773,260	102.3%
Buffalo Sabres	HSBC Arena	41	18,452	756,568	98.7%
Washington Capitals	Verizon Center	41	18,397	754,309	100.0%
Ottawa Senators	Scotiabank Place	41	18,378	753,525	99.3%
Pittsburgh Penguins	Consol Energy Center	40	18,240	729,628	100.9%
New York Rangers	Madison Square Garden	41	18,108	742,432	99.5%
Los Angeles Kings	Staples Center	41	18,083	741,404	99.8%
Minnesota Wild	Xcel Energy Center	40	18,012	720,508	99.7%
Boston Bruins	TD Garden	40	17,565	702,600	100.0%
San Jose Sharks	HP Pavilion at San Jose	40	17,562	702,480	100.4%
Tampa Bay Lightning	St. Pete Times Forum	41	17,268	708,022	87.4%
Edmonton Oilers	Rexall Place	41	16,839	690,399	100.0%
Carolina Hurricanes	RBC Center	40	16,415	656,611	87.6%
Nashville Predators	Bridgestone Arena	41	16,142	661,861	94.3%
Florida Panthers	BankAtlantic Center	41	15,685	643,116	81.5%
Dallas Stars	American Airlines Center	41	15,073	617,997	81.3%
Colorado Avalanche	Pepsi Center	41	14,820	607,650	82.3%
New Jersey Devils	Prudential Center	41	14,775	605,803	83.8%
Anaheim Ducks	Honda Center	41	14,738	604,283	85.8%
Columbus Blue Jackets	Nationwide Arena	40	13,658	546,350	75.3%
Atlanta Thrashers	Philips Arena	41	13,469	552,230	72.6%
Phoenix Coyotes	Jobing.com Arena	40	12,188	487,543	71.2%
New York Islanders	Nassau Veterans Memorial Coliseum	41	11,059	453,456	67.9%

Notes:

- Totals do not include six regular-season opening games played in Europe, and two outdoor regular season games.
- The Carolina Hurricanes played the Minnesota Wild at Hartwall Areena in Helsinki, Finland.
- The Columbus Blue Jackets played the San Jose Sharks at the Ericsson Globe in Stockholm, Sweden
- The Boston Bruins played the Phoenix Coyotes at O2 Arena in Prague, Czech Republic.
- The Washington Capitals played the Pittsburgh Penguins outdoors in the Winter Classic at Heinz Field in Pittsburgh, Pennsylvania.
- The Montreal Canadiens played the Calgary Flames outdoors in the Heritage Classic at McMahon Stadium in Calgary, Alberta.
- As of October 2010, Calgary's Pengrowth Saddledome was renamed Scotiabank Saddledome.
- As of August 2011, Buffalo's HSBC Arena was renamed First Niagara Center.
- Following the 2010–11 season, the Atlanta Thrashers relocated and became the new Winnipeg Jets.
- As of March 15, 2012, the Carolina Hurricanes venue, RBC Center, has been renamed PNC Arena.

=== 2011–12 ===
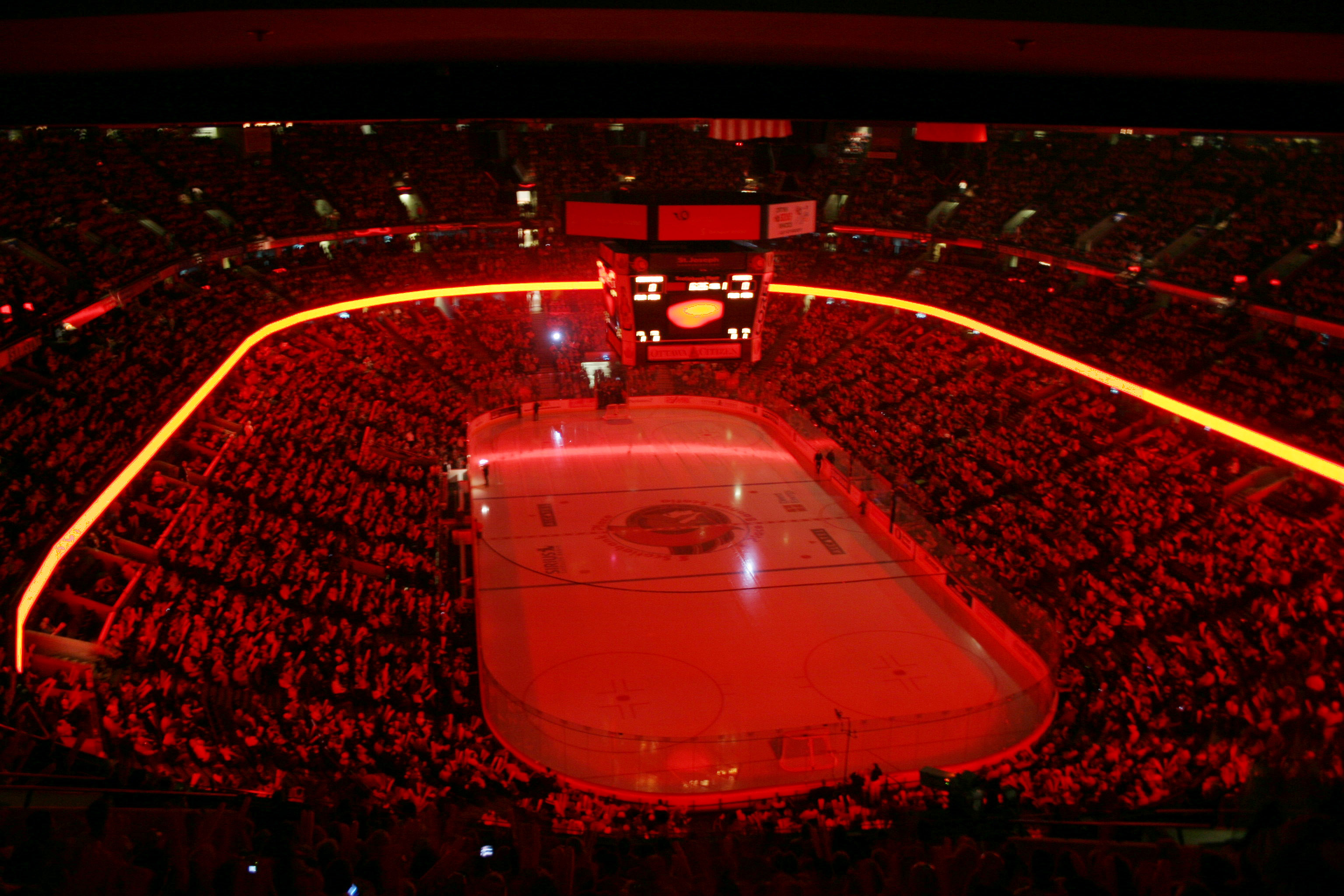
Scotiabank Place

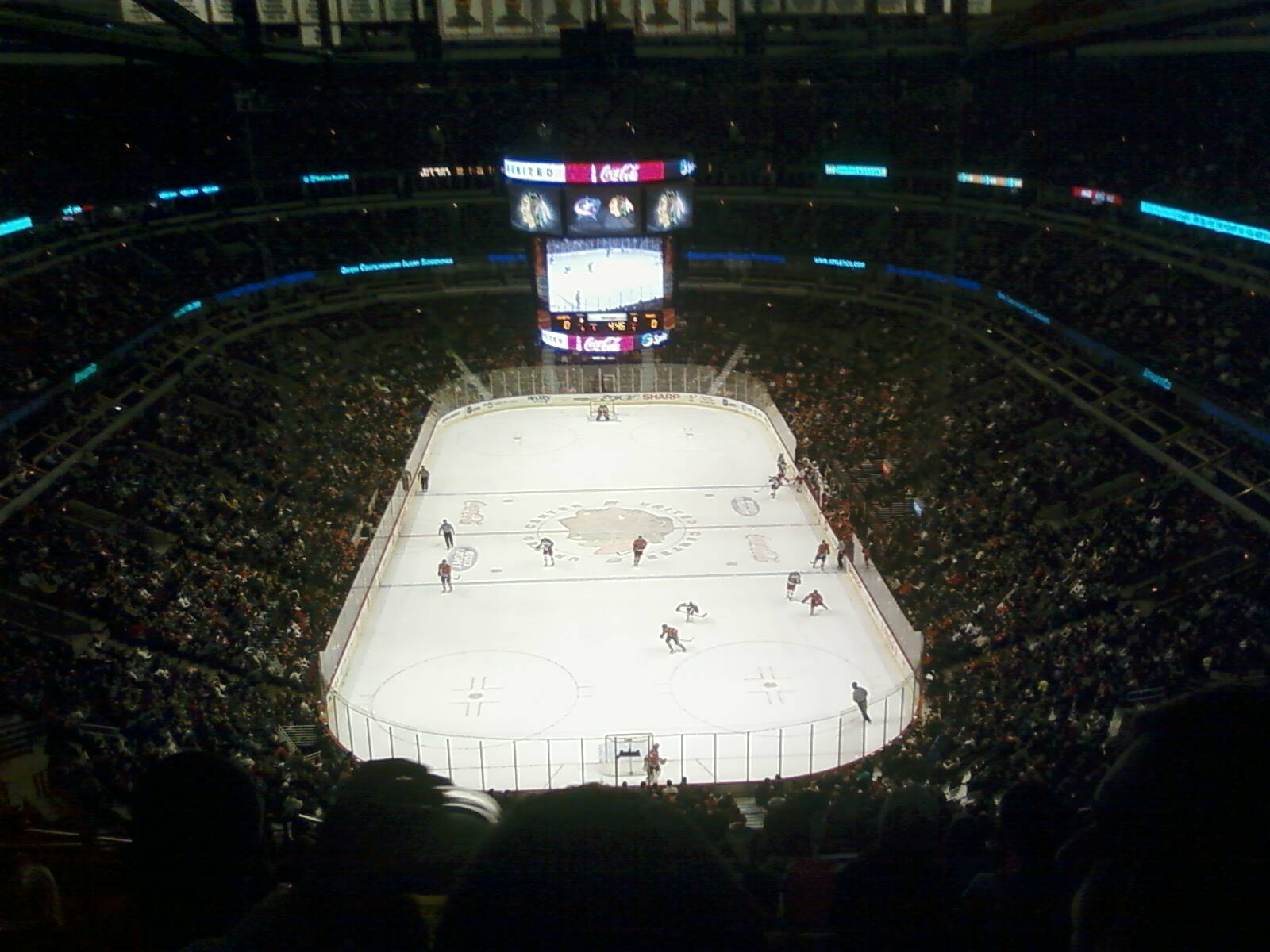
United Center

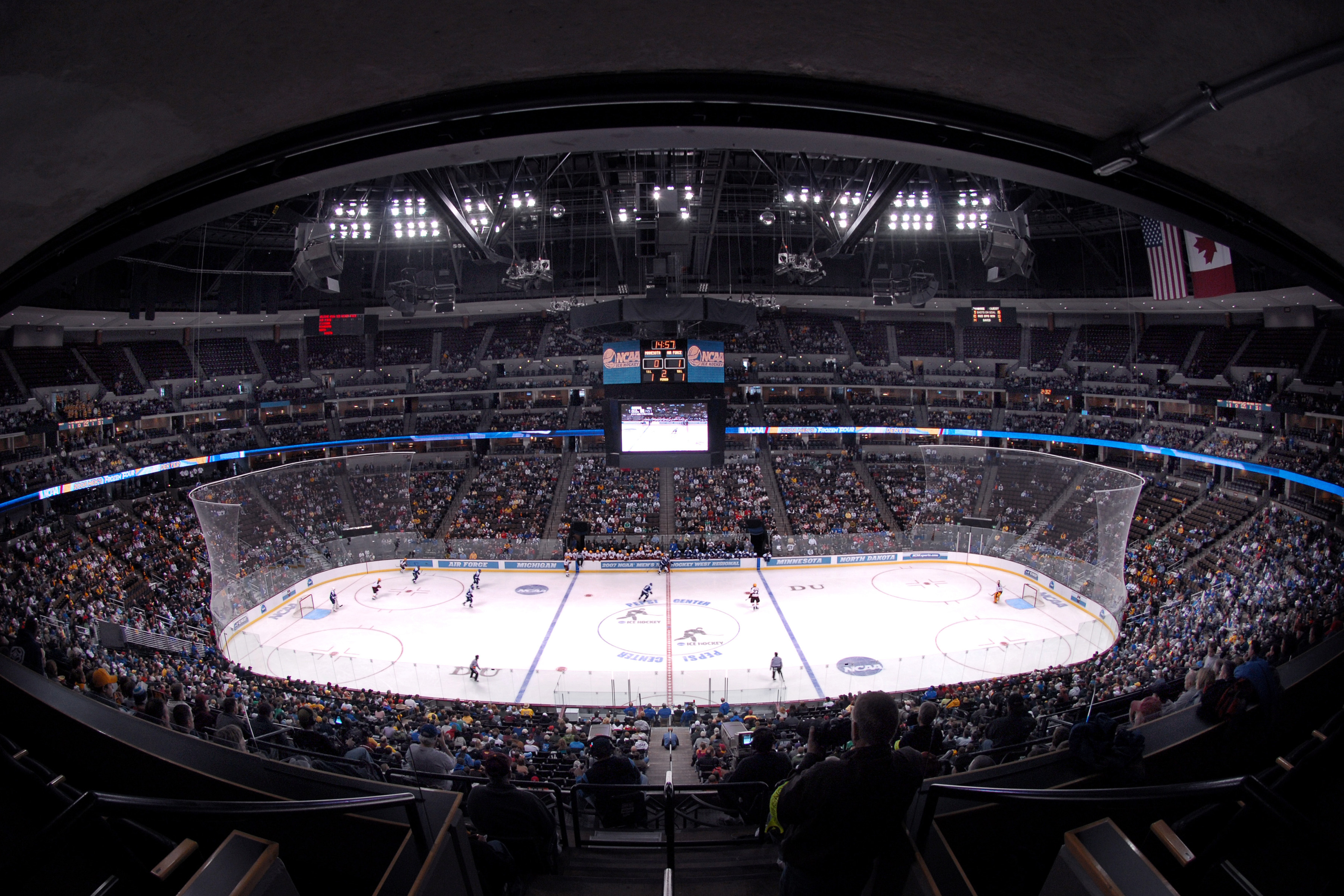
Pepsi Center

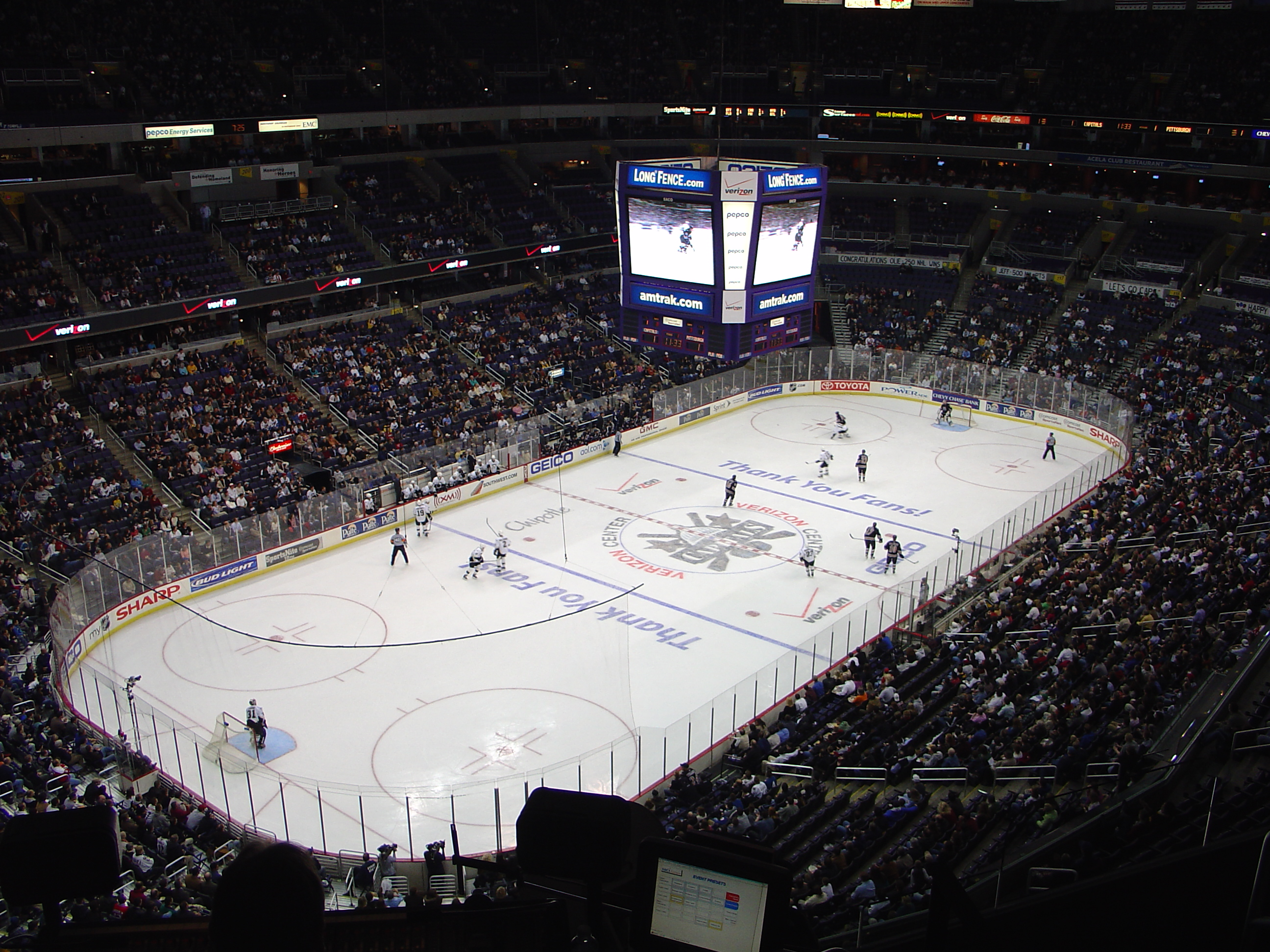
Verizon Center

Team	Arena	Home games	Average attendance	Total attendance	Capacity percentage
Chicago Blackhawks	United Center	41	21,533	882,874	109.2%
Montreal Canadiens	Bell Centre	41	21,273	872,193	100.0%
Philadelphia Flyers	Wells Fargo Center	40	19,770	790,787	101.2%
Detroit Red Wings	Joe Louis Arena	41	20,066	822,706	100.0%
Toronto Maple Leafs	Air Canada Centre	41	19,505	799,686	103.6%
Ottawa Senators	Scotiabank Place	41	19,357	793,612	101.1%
Calgary Flames	Scotiabank Saddledome	41	19,289	790,849	100.0%
Vancouver Canucks	Rogers Arena	41	18,884	774,250	100.1%
St. Louis Blues	Scottrade Center	41	18,810	771,207	98.2%
Buffalo Sabres	First Niagara Center	40	18,680	747,209	99.9%
Pittsburgh Penguins	Consol Energy Center	41	18,569	761,224	101.0%
Washington Capitals	Verizon Center	41	18,506	758,746	100.0%
Tampa Bay Lightning	Tampa Bay Times Forum	41	18,468	757,192	96.2%
New York Rangers	Madison Square Garden	41	18,191	745,852	99.9%
Los Angeles Kings	Staples Center	39	18,109	706,236	99.9%
Minnesota Wild	Xcel Energy Center	41	17,772	728,683	98.4%
Boston Bruins	TD Garden	41	17,565	720,165	100.0%
San Jose Sharks	HP Pavilion at San Jose	41	17,562	720,042	100.0%
Edmonton Oilers	Rexall Place	41	16,839	690,399	100.0%
Nashville Predators	Bridgestone Arena	41	16,691	684,324	97.5%
Florida Panthers	BankAtlantic Center	41	16,628	681,763	86.4%
Carolina Hurricanes	PNC Arena	41	16,043	657,747	85.9%
Colorado Avalanche	Pepsi Center	41	15,499	635,440	86.1%
New Jersey Devils	Prudential Center	41	15,397	631,258	87.4%
Winnipeg Jets	MTS Centre	41	15,004	615,164	100.0%
Anaheim Ducks	Honda Center	40	14,784	591,371	86.1%
Columbus Blue Jackets	Nationwide Arena	41	14,660	601,061	80.1%
Dallas Stars	American Airlines Center	41	14,227	583,306	76.8%
New York Islanders	Nassau Veterans Memorial Coliseum	41	13,191	540,838	81.3%
Phoenix Coyotes	Jobing.com Arena	41	12,421	509,241	72.3%
Total		1,225	17,441	21,365,425	

Notes:

- Totals do not include four regular-season opening games played in Europe, and one outdoor regular season games.
- The Buffalo Sabres played one home game against the Anaheim Ducks at Hartwall Areena in Helsinki, Finland.
- The Anaheim Ducks played one home game against the New York Rangers at the Ericsson Globe in Stockholm, Sweden.
- The Los Angeles Kings played two home games, one against the New York Rangers at Ericsson Globe in Stockholm, Sweden, and one against the Buffalo Sabres at O2 World in Berlin, Germany.
- The Philadelphia Flyers played the New York Rangers outdoors in the Winter Classic at Citizens Bank Park in Philadelphia, Pennsylvania.

=== 2012–13 ===
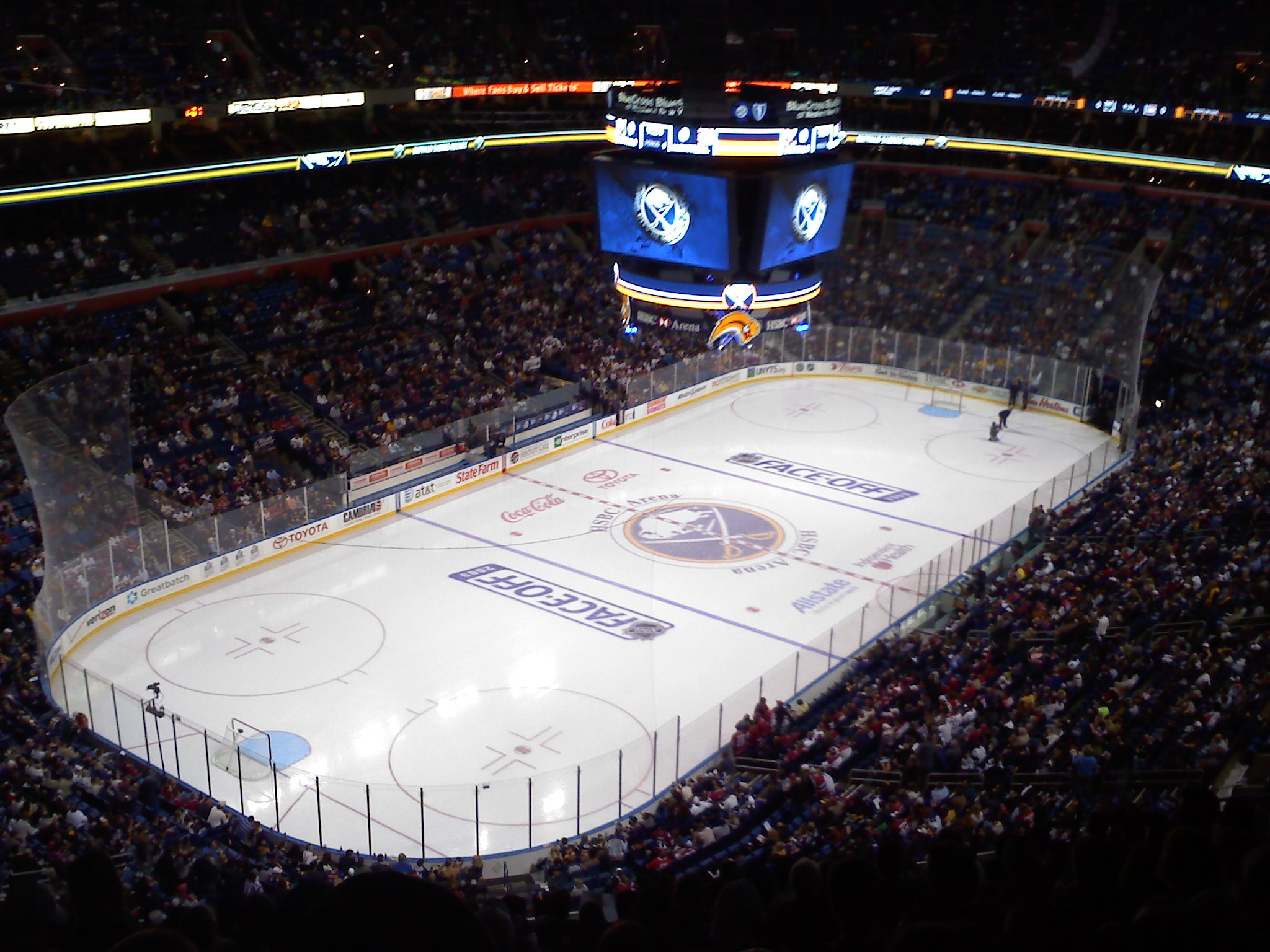
First Niagara Center

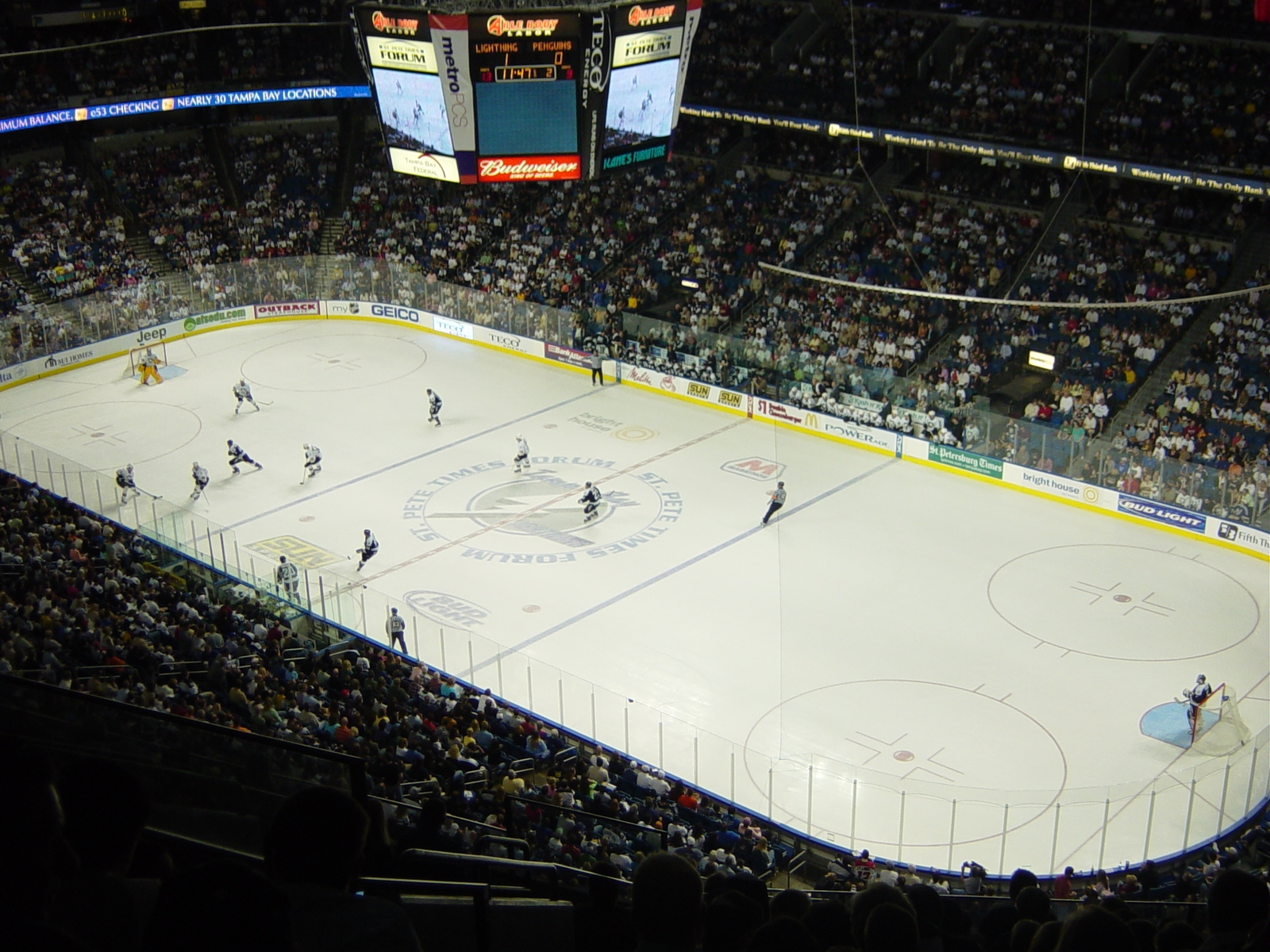
Amalie Arena

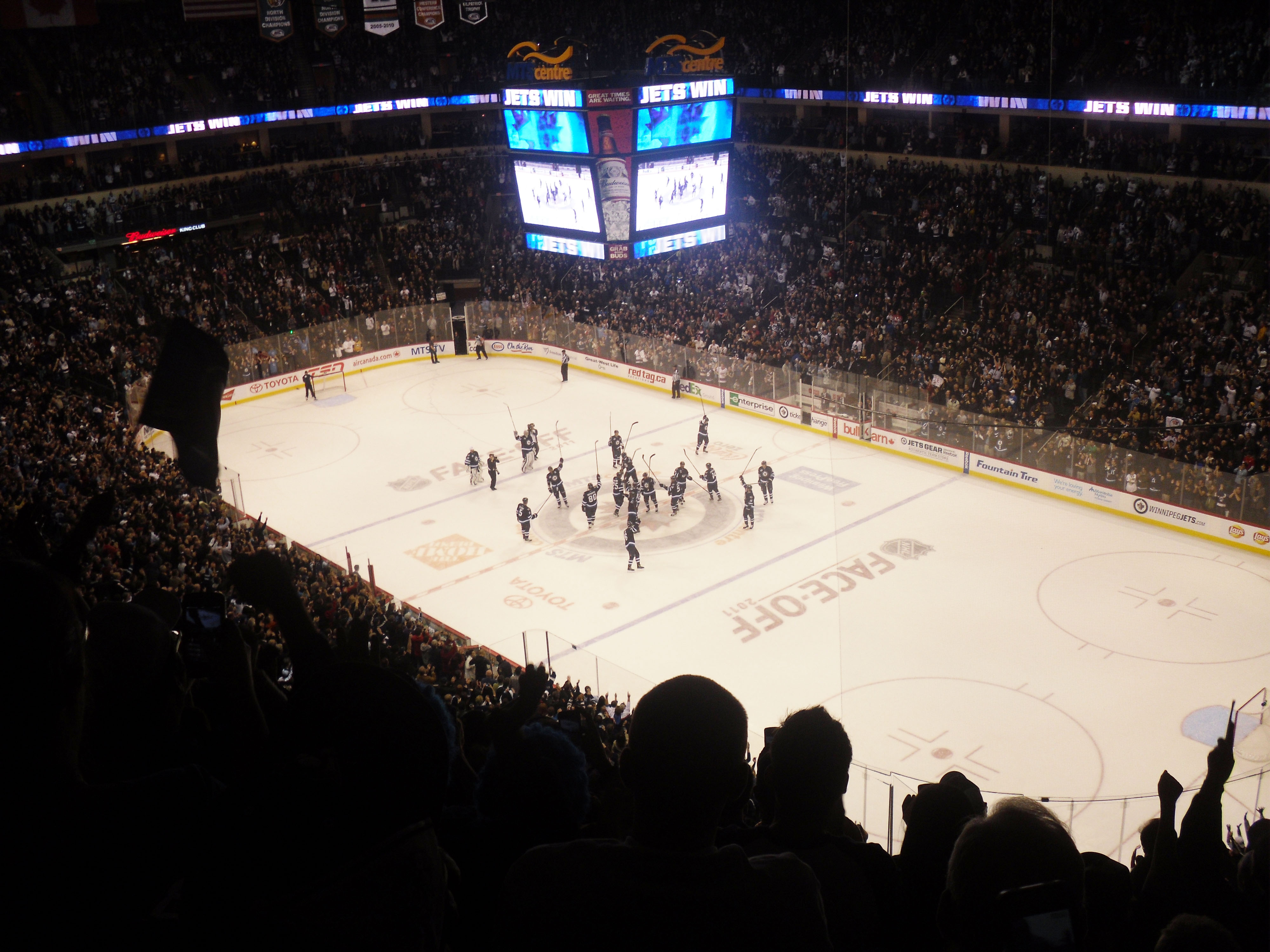
MTS Centre

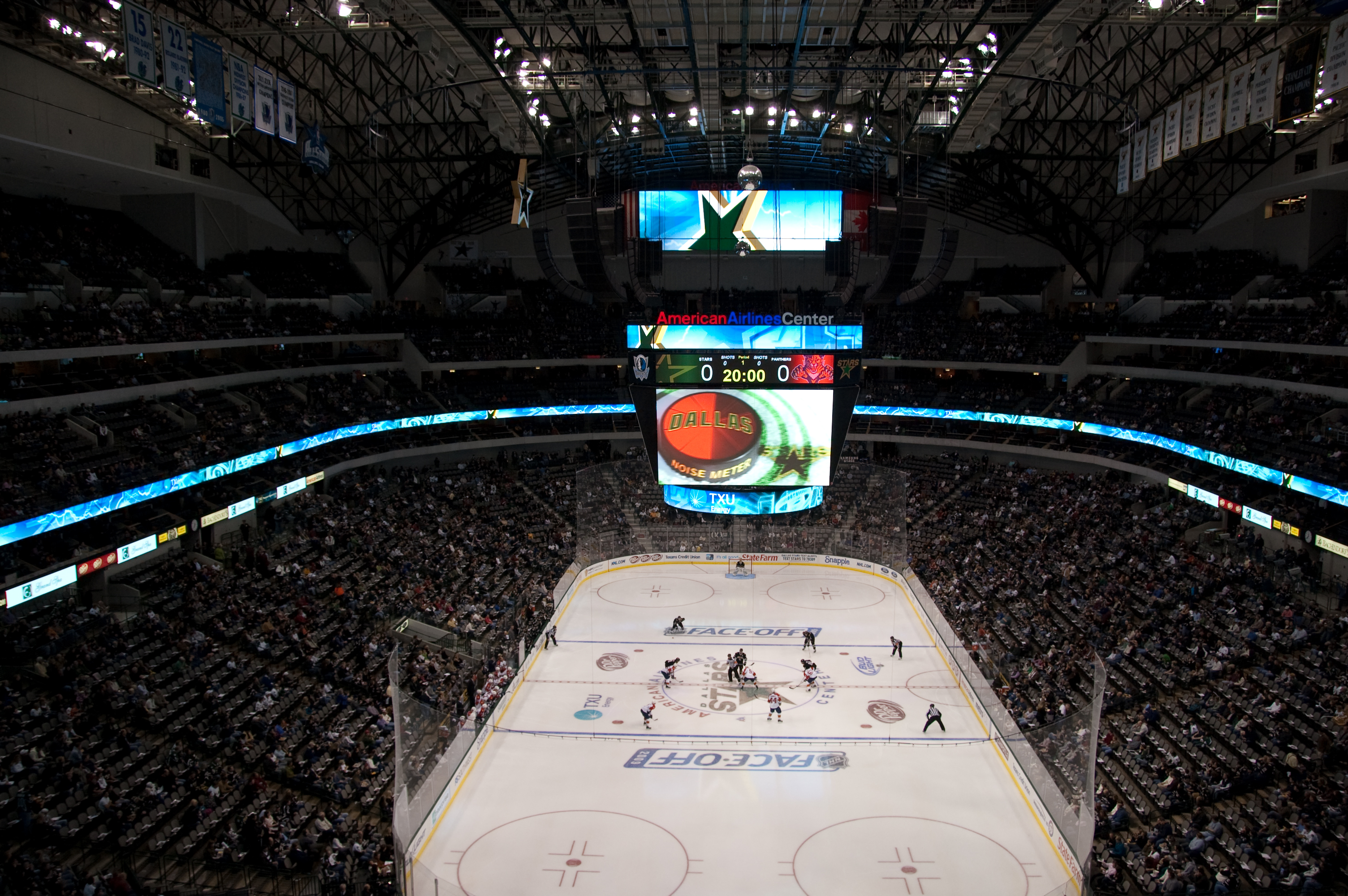
American Airlines Center

Team	Arena	Home games	Average attendance	Total attendance	Capacity percentage
Chicago Blackhawks	United Center	24	21,755	522,619	110.4%
Montreal Canadiens	Bell Centre	24	21,273	510,552	100.0%
Detroit Red Wings	Joe Louis Arena	24	20,066	481,584	100.0%
Philadelphia Flyers	Wells Fargo Center	24	19,786	474,878	101.3%
Toronto Maple Leafs	Air Canada Centre	24	19,426	466,224	103.2%
Ottawa Senators	Scotiabank Place	24	19,408	465,801	101.3%
Calgary Flames	Scotiabank Saddledome	24	19,289	462,936	100.0%
Tampa Bay Lightning	Tampa Bay Times Forum	24	19,055	457,337	99.2%
Buffalo Sabres	First Niagara Center	24	18,970	455,290	99.5%
Vancouver Canucks	Rogers Arena	24	18,947	454,740	100.2%
Minnesota Wild	Xcel Energy Center	24	18,794	451,075	104.7%
Pittsburgh Penguins	Consol Energy Center	24	18,648	447,560	101.4%
Los Angeles Kings	Staples Center	24	18,178	436,295	100.3%
Washington Capitals	Verizon Center	24	17,734	425,638	95.8%
Boston Bruins	TD Garden	24	17,565	421,560	100.0%
San Jose Sharks	HP Pavilion at San Jose	24	17,561	421,472	100.0%
Carolina Hurricanes	PNC Arena	24	17,558	421,401	94.0%
St. Louis Blues	Scottrade Center	24	17,263	414,328	90.1%
New York Rangers	Madison Square Garden	24	17,200	412,800	100.0%
New Jersey Devils	Prudential Center	24	17,114	410,739	97.1%
Dallas Stars	American Airlines Center	24	17,063	409,521	92.1%
Florida Panthers	BankAtlantic Center	24	16,991	407,806	99.7%
Nashville Predators	Bridgestone Arena	24	16,974	407,386	99.2%
Edmonton Oilers	Rexall Place	24	16,839	404,136	100.0%
Anaheim Ducks	Honda Center	24	15,887	381,308	92.5%
Colorado Avalanche	Pepsi Center	24	15,444	370,677	85.8%
Winnipeg Jets	MTS Centre	24	15,004	360,096	100.0%
Columbus Blue Jackets	Nationwide Arena	24	14,564	349,558	80.3%
Phoenix Coyotes	Jobing.com Arena	24	13,923	334,165	81.3%
New York Islanders	Nassau Veterans Memorial Coliseum	24	13,306	319,362	82.3%
Total		720	17,721	12,758,849	

=== 2013–14 ===
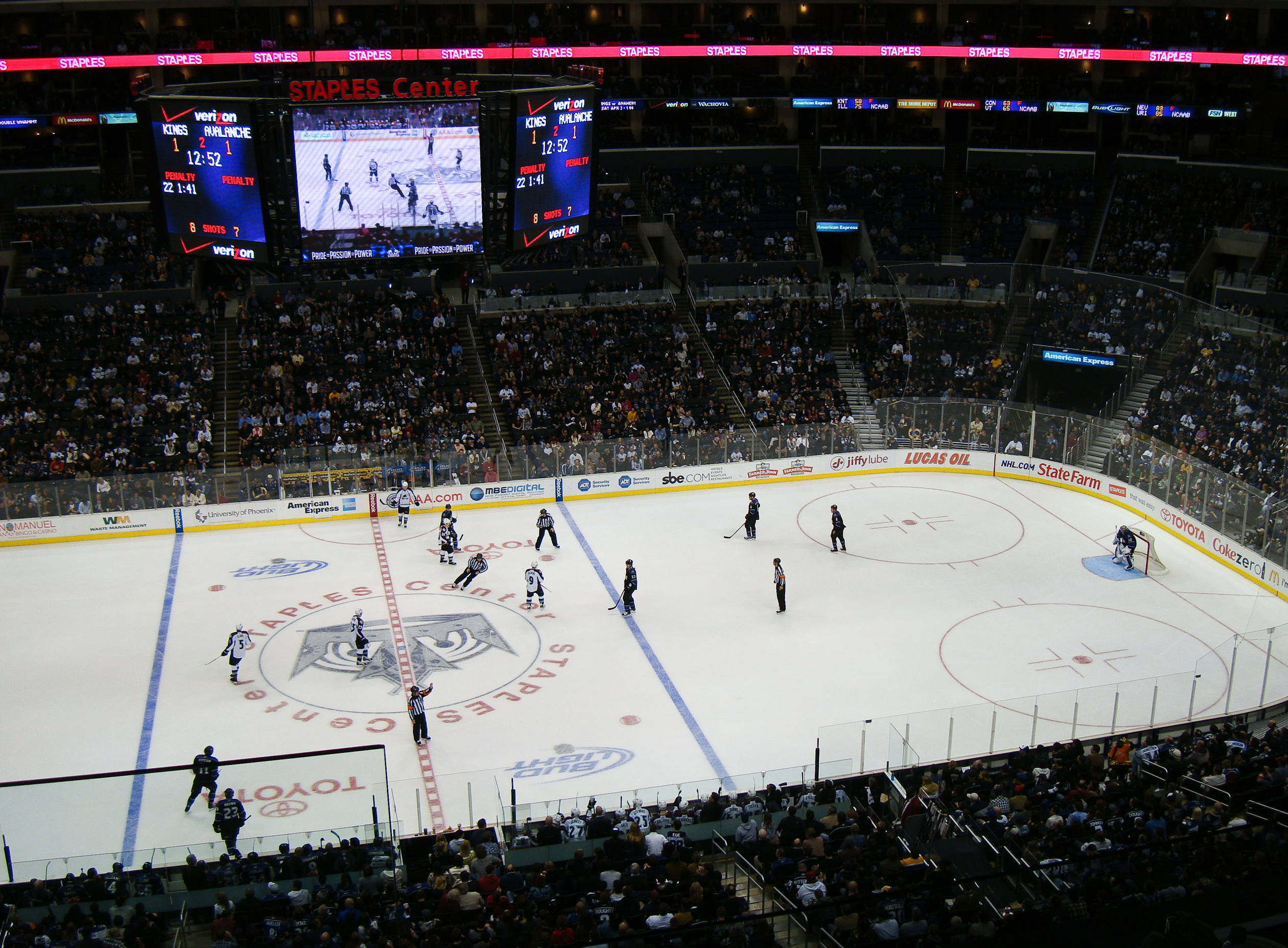
Staples Center

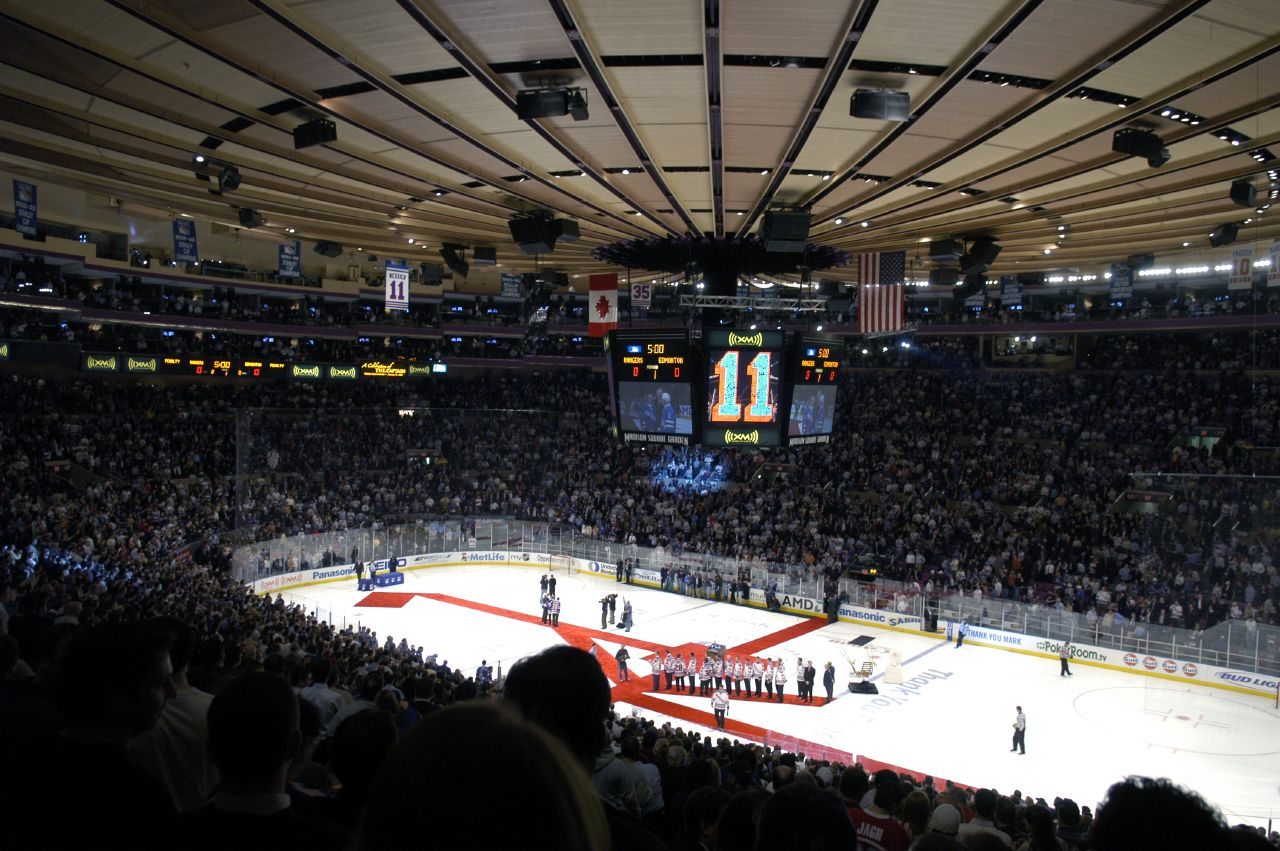
Madison Square Garden

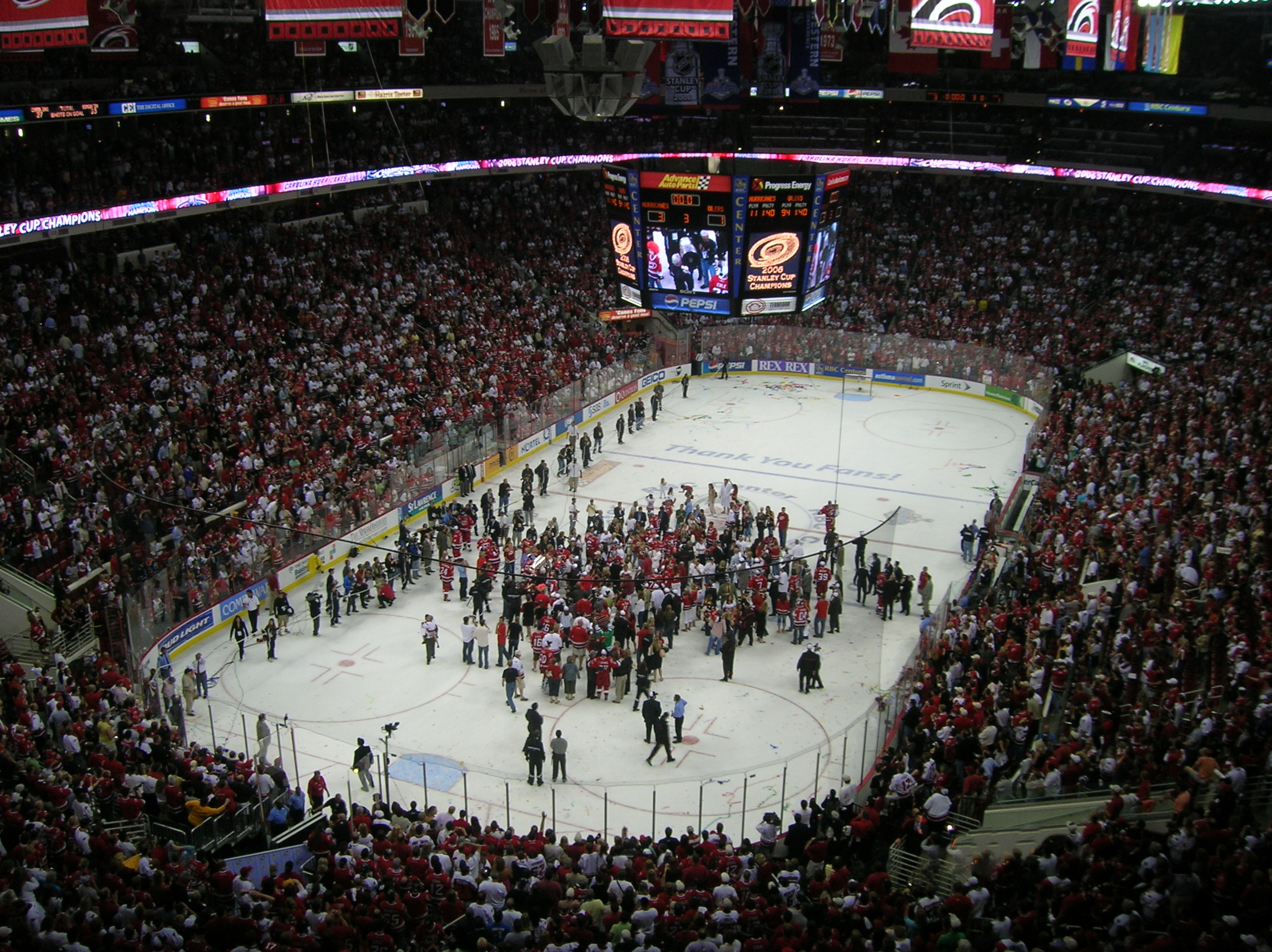
PNC Arena

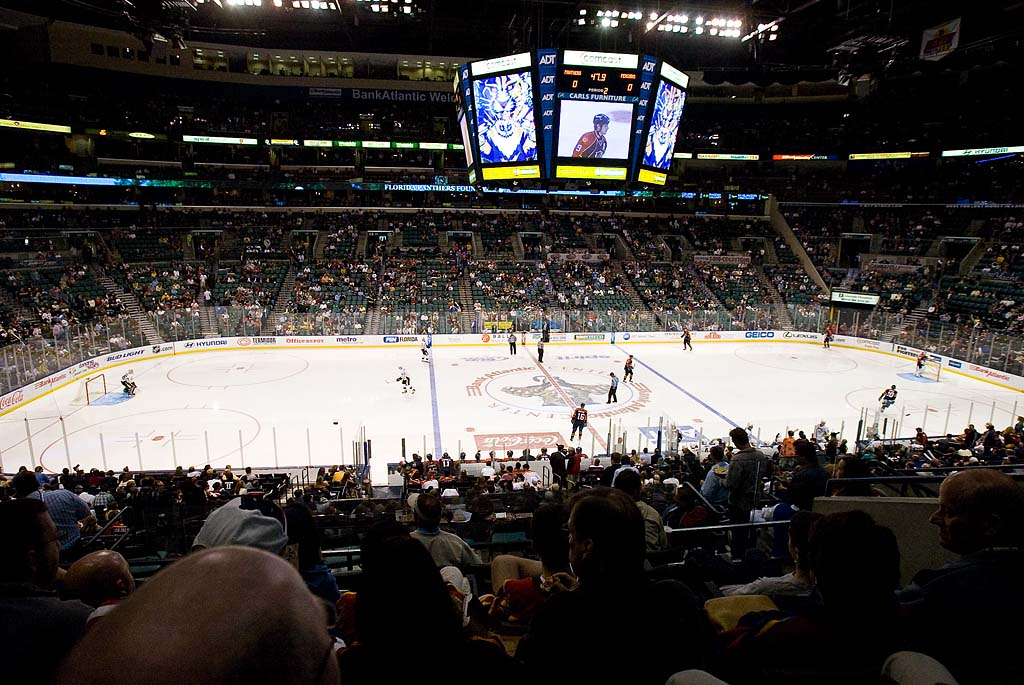
BB&T Center

Team	Arena	Home games	Average attendance	Total attendance	Capacity percentage
Chicago Blackhawks	United Center	41	22,623	927,545	117.6%
Detroit Red Wings	Joe Louis Arena	41	22,149	908,131	110.4%
Montreal Canadiens	Bell Centre	41	21,273	872,193	100.0%
Philadelphia Flyers	Wells Fargo Center	41	19,839	813,411	101.5%
Vancouver Canucks	Rogers Arena	41	19,770	810,594	107.2%
Toronto Maple Leafs	Air Canada Centre	41	19,446	797,310	103.3%
Calgary Flames	Scotiabank Saddledome	41	19,302	791,389	100.1%
Los Angeles Kings	Staples Center	41	19,017	779,734	107.6%
Pittsburgh Penguins	Consol Energy Center	41	18,618	763,344	101.3%
Tampa Bay Lightning	Tampa Bay Times Forum	41	18,612	763,096	96.9%
Buffalo Sabres	First Niagara Center	41	18,579	761,767	97.4%
Minnesota Wild	Xcel Energy Center	41	18,505	758,729	103.1%
Ottawa Senators	Canadian Tire Centre	41	18,109	742,468	94.5%
Washington Capitals	Verizon Center	41	18,054	740,240	97.6%
New York Rangers	Madison Square Garden	41	18,006	738,246	100.0%
Boston Bruins	TD Garden	41	17,565	720,165	100.0%
San Jose Sharks	SAP Center at San Jose	41	17,133	702,480	97.6%
St. Louis Blues	Scottrade Center	41	17,025	698,059	88.9%
Edmonton Oilers	Rexall Place	41	16,828	689,949	99.9%
Nashville Predators	Bridgestone Arena	41	16,600	680,619	97.0%
Anaheim Ducks	Honda Center	41	16,469	675,248	95.9%
Colorado Avalanche	Pepsi Center	41	16,295	668,133	90.5%
Carolina Hurricanes	PNC Arena	41	15,483	634,832	82.9%
New Jersey Devils	Prudential Center	41	15,257	625,570	88.7%
Winnipeg Jets	MTS Centre	41	15,004	615,164	100.0%
New York Islanders	Nassau Veterans Memorial Coliseum	41	14,740	604,362	93.4%
Columbus Blue Jackets	Nationwide Arena	41	14,698	602,619	81.0%
Dallas Stars	American Airlines Center	41	14,658	601,008	79.1%
Florida Panthers	BB&T Center	41	14,177	581,286	83.2%
Phoenix Coyotes	Jobing.com Arena	41	13,775	564,798	80.4%
Total		1,230	17,587	21,632,479	

Notes:

- Totals include six outdoor regular season games.
- The Detroit Red Wings played the Toronto Maple Leafs outdoors in the Winter Classic at Michigan Stadium in Ann Arbor, Michigan
- The inaugural NHL Stadium Series had four games: Anaheim Ducks versus Los Angeles Kings at Los Angeles' Dodger Stadium, Pittsburgh Penguins versus Chicago Blackhawks at Chicago's Soldier Field, and two games at Yankee Stadium, with the New York Rangers playing visitor to both the New Jersey Devils and the New York Islanders.
- The Vancouver Canucks played the Ottawa Senators outdoors in the NHL Heritage Classic at BC Place, in Vancouver, British Columbia.

=== 2014–15 ===
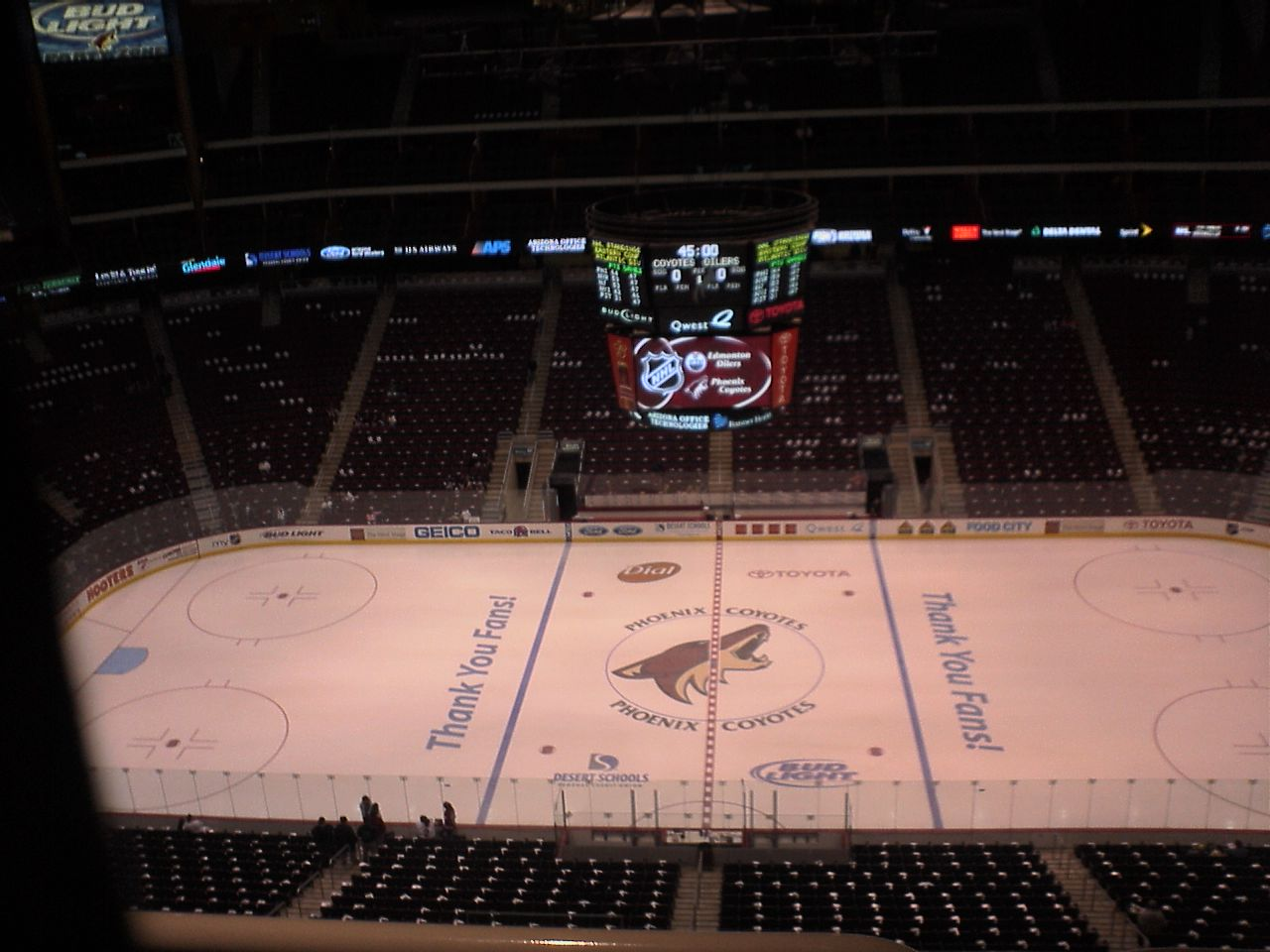
Gila River Arena

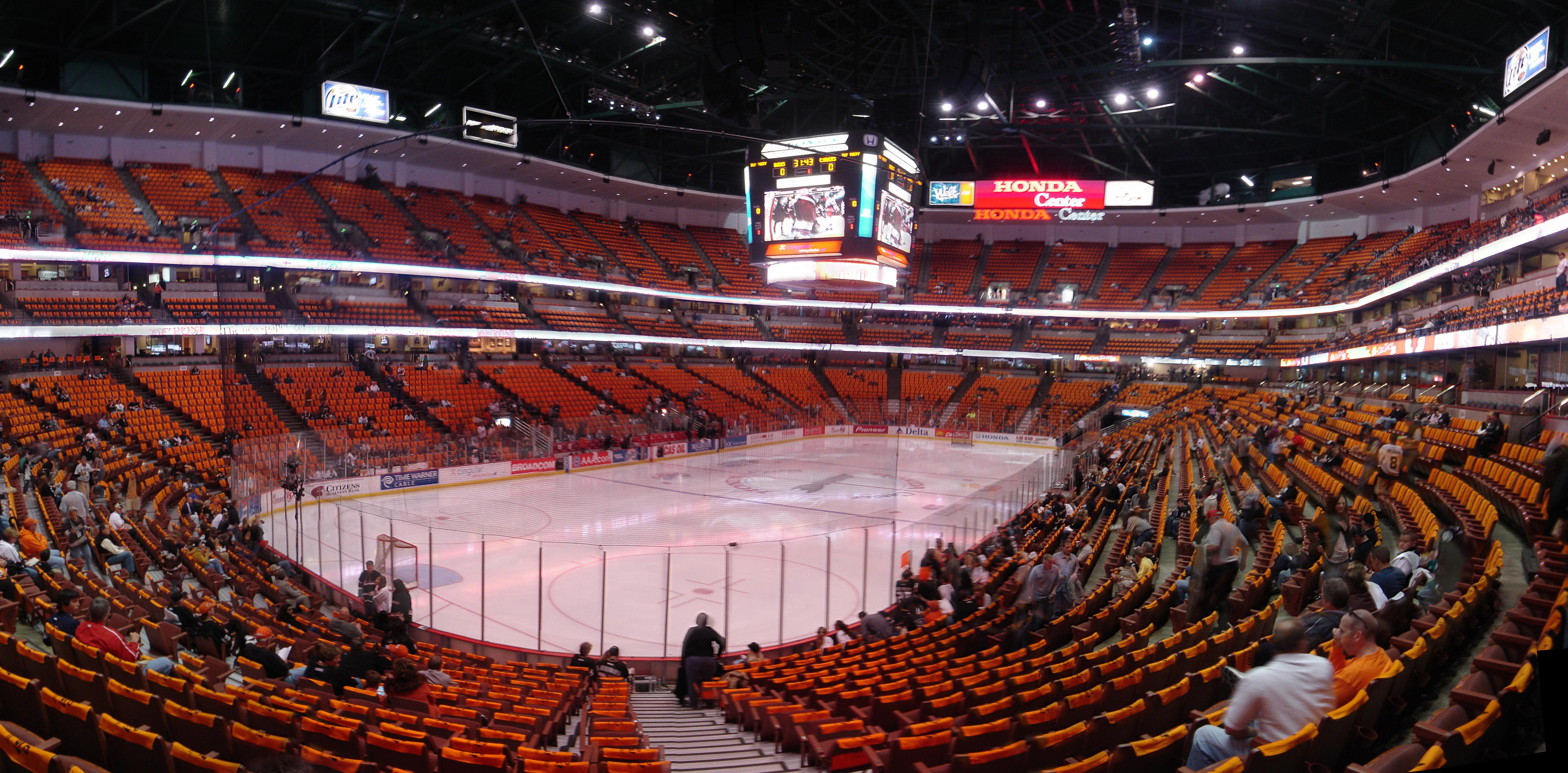
Honda Center

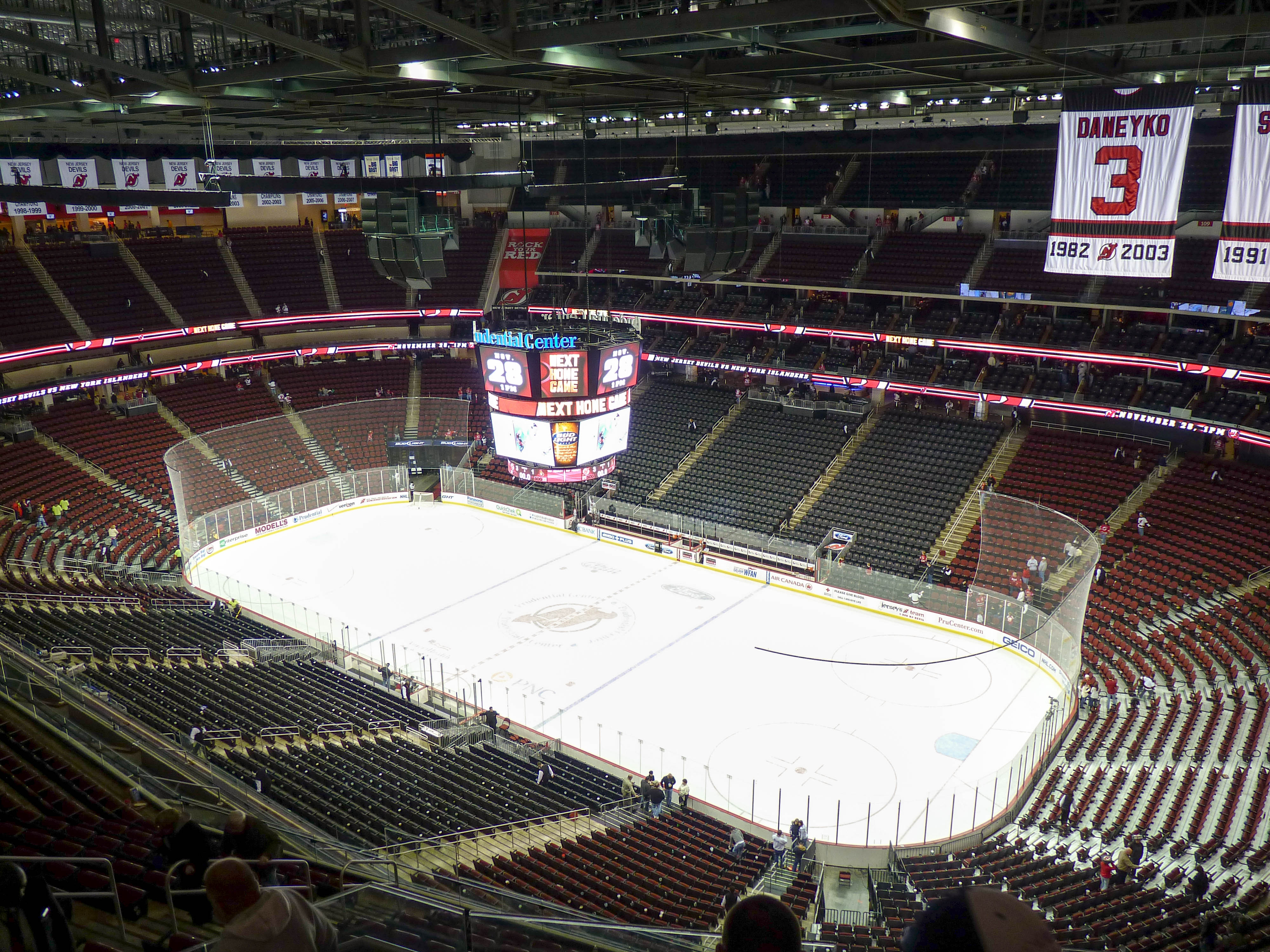
Prudential Center

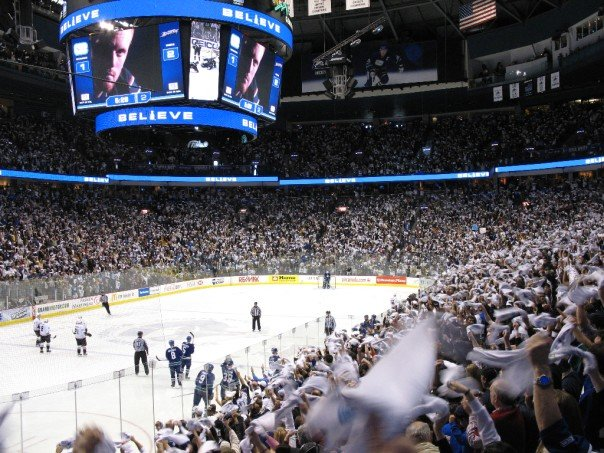
Rogers Arena

Team	Arena	Home games	Average attendance	Total attendance	Capacity percentage
Chicago Blackhawks	United Center	41	21,769	892,532	110.4%
Montreal Canadiens	Bell Centre	41	21,286	872,752	99.9%
Detroit Red Wings	Joe Louis Arena	41	20,027	821,107	100.0%
Philadelphia Flyers	Wells Fargo Center	41	19,270	790,107	98.6%
Calgary Flames	Scotiabank Saddledome	41	19,097	782,977	99.0%
Toronto Maple Leafs	Air Canada Centre	41	19,062	781,576	101.3%
Minnesota Wild	Xcel Energy Center	41	19,023	779,944	106.0%
Tampa Bay Lightning	Amalie Arena	41	18,823	771,761	98.0%
Vancouver Canucks	Rogers Arena	41	18,710	767,149	98.9%
Pittsburgh Penguins	Consol Energy Center	41	18,617	763,319	101.3%
Washington Capitals	Verizon Center	40	18,506	740,240	100.0%
Buffalo Sabres	First Niagara Center	41	18,580	761,809	97.4%
St. Louis Blues	Scottrade Center	41	18,545	760,349	96.8%
Los Angeles Kings	Staples Center	41	18,265	748,893	100.2%
Ottawa Senators	Canadian Tire Centre	41	18,247	748,112	95.3%
New York Rangers	Madison Square Garden	41	18,006	738,246	100.0%
Boston Bruins	TD Garden	41	17,565	720,165	100.0%
San Jose Sharks	SAP Center at San Jose	40	17,420	696,807	99.6%
Dallas Stars	American Airlines Center	41	17,350	711,359	93.6%
Anaheim Ducks	Honda Center	41	16,874	691,835	98.3%
Nashville Predators	Bridgestone Arena	41	16,854	691,028	98.5%
Edmonton Oilers	Rexall Place	41	16,839	690,399	100.0%
Colorado Avalanche	Pepsi Center	41	16,176	663,247	89.8%
Columbus Blue Jackets	Nationwide Arena	41	15,511	635,973	85.5%
New York Islanders	Nassau Veterans Memorial Coliseum	41	15,334	628,729	94.8%
New Jersey Devils	Prudential Center	41	15,189	622,783	86.2%
Winnipeg Jets	MTS Centre	41	15,037	616,556	100.2%
Arizona Coyotes	Gila River Arena	41	13,345	547,149	77.9%
Carolina Hurricanes	PNC Arena	41	12,594	516,375	67.4%
Florida Panthers	BB&T Center	41	11,265	461,877	66.1%
Total		1,228	17,439	21,415,155	

Notes:

- Totals do not include two outdoor regular season games.
- The Washington Capitals played the Chicago Blackhawks outdoors in the Winter Classic at Nationals Park in Washington, D.C.
- The San Jose Sharks hosted the 2015 NHL Stadium Series at Levi's Stadium in Santa Clara, California, against the Los Angeles Kings.
- Jobing.com Arena renamed Gila River Arena.

=== 2015–16 ===
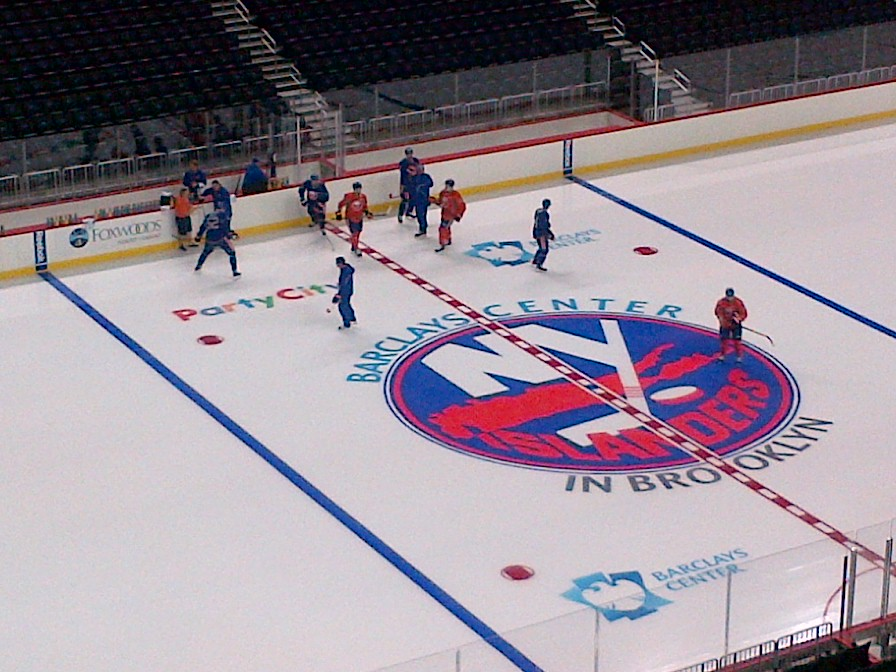
Barclays Center

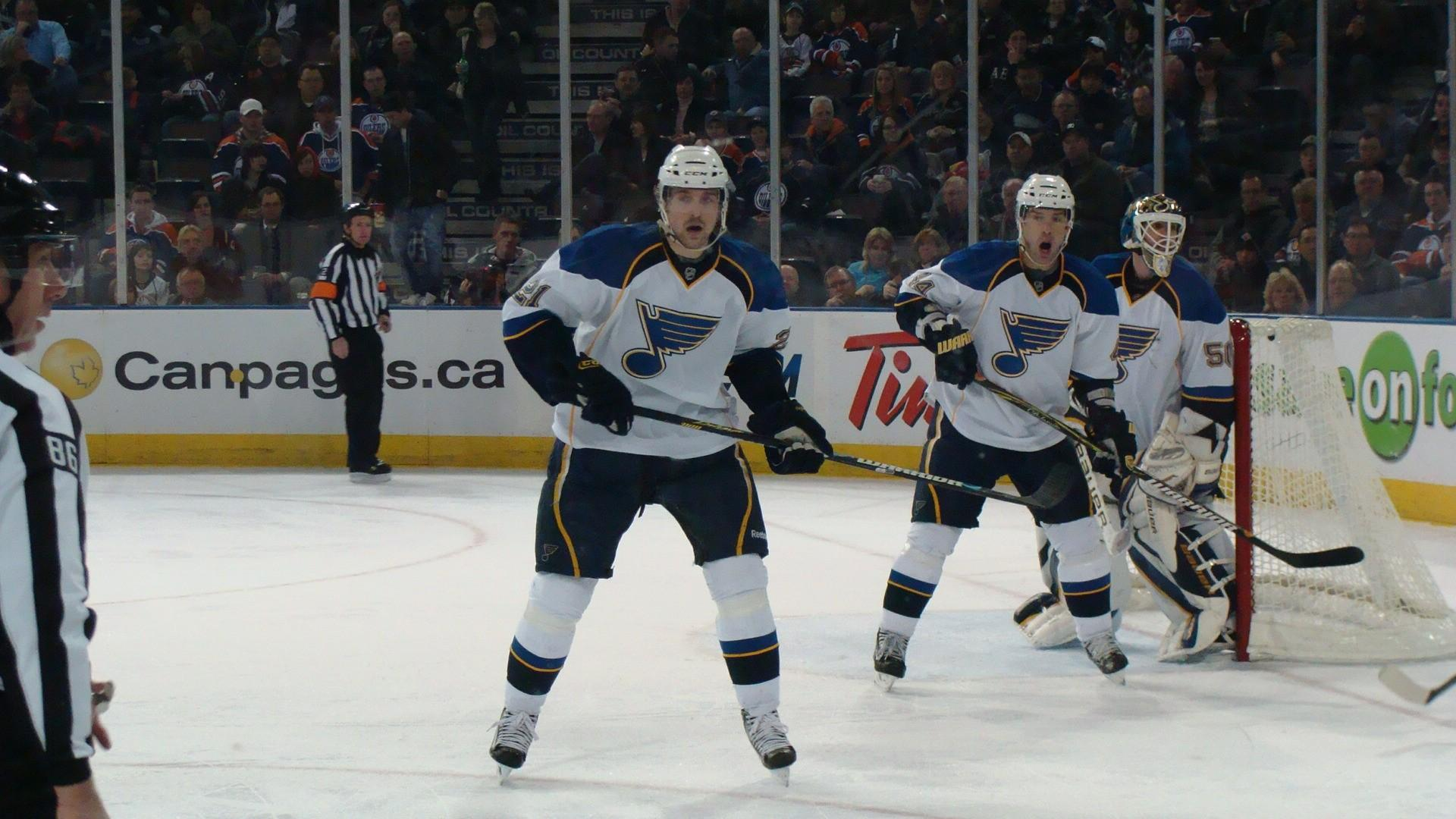
Rexall Place

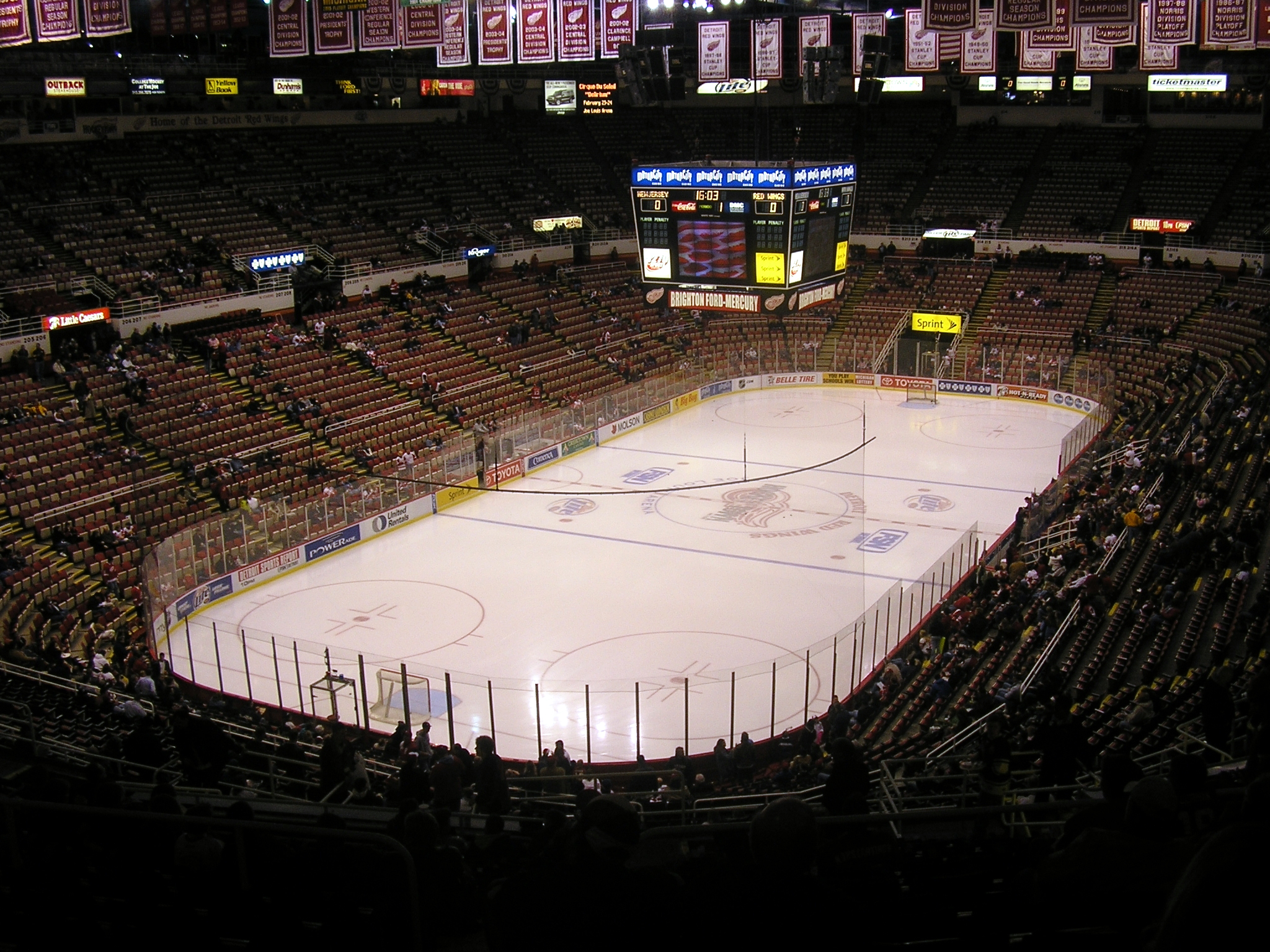
Joe Louis Arena

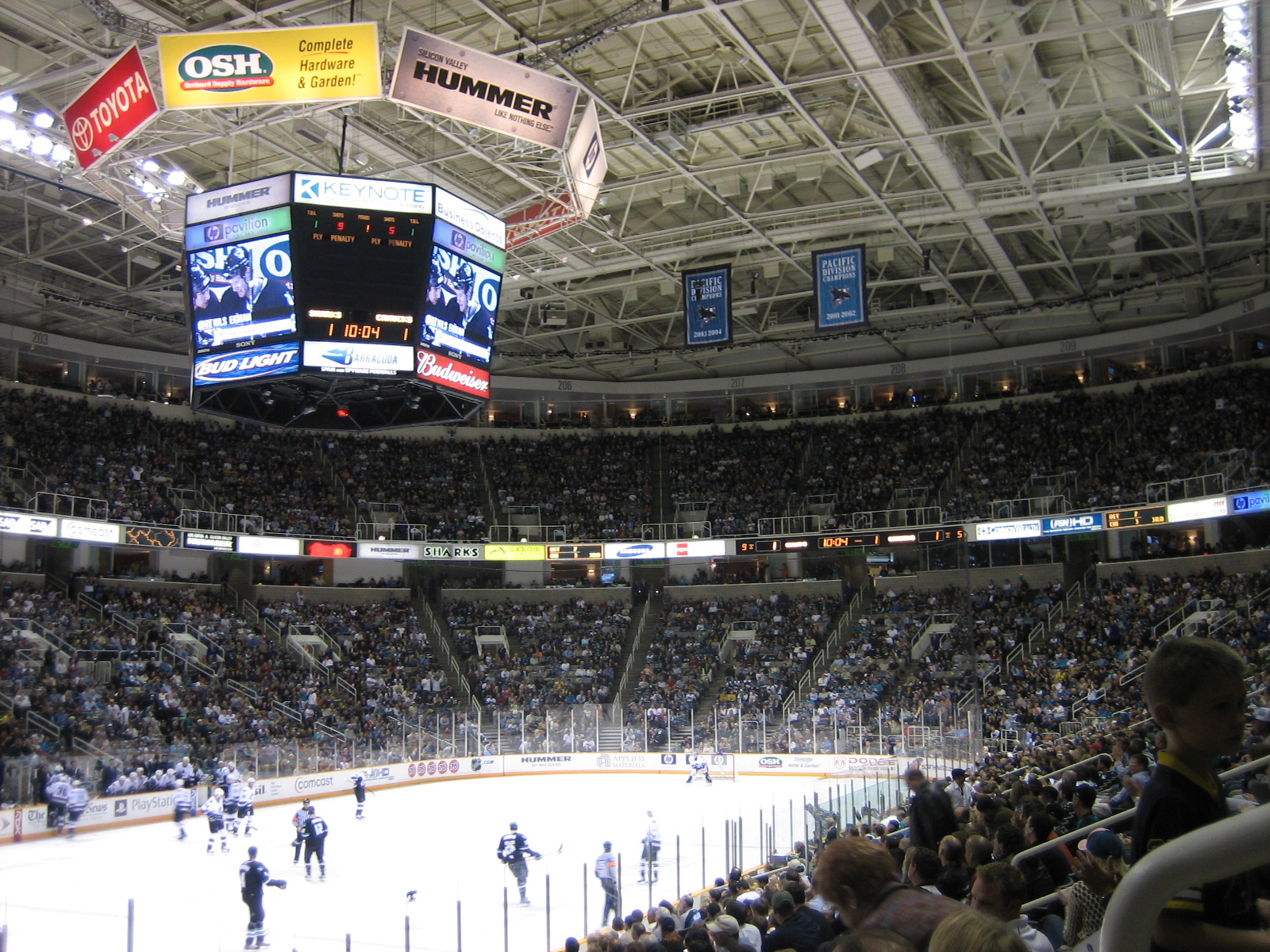
SAP Center at San Jose

Team	Arena	Home games	Average attendance	Total attendance	Capacity percentage
Chicago Blackhawks	United Center	41	22,859	896,240	110.9%
Montreal Canadiens	Bell Centre	41	21,288	872,808	100.0%
Detroit Red Wings	Joe Louis Arena	41	20,027	821,107	100.0%
Philadelphia Flyers	Wells Fargo Center	41	19,228	788,319	98.4%
Toronto Maple Leafs	Air Canada Centre	41	19,158	785,485	101.8%
Calgary Flames	Scotiabank Saddledome	41	19,145	784,974	99.3%
Tampa Bay Lightning	Amalie Arena	41	19,092	782,772	100.0%
Minnesota Wild	Xcel Energy Center	40	19,062	762,481	106.1%
Buffalo Sabres	First Niagara Center	41	18,590	762,223	97.5%
Pittsburgh Penguins	Consol Energy Center	41	18,550	760,584	100.9%
Washington Capitals	Verizon Center	41	18,510	758,944	100.0%
St. Louis Blues	Scottrade Center	41	18,450	756,483	96.3%
Vancouver Canucks	Rogers Arena	41	18,431	755,677	97.5%
Dallas Stars	American Airlines Center	41	18,376	753,452	99.2%
Los Angeles Kings	Staples Center	41	18,274	749,234	100.2%
Ottawa Senators	Canadian Tire Centre	41	18,085	741,472	94.4%
New York Rangers	Madison Square Garden	41	18,006	738,246	100.0%
Boston Bruins	TD Garden	40	17,565	702,600	100.0%
Nashville Predators	Bridgestone Arena	41	16,971	695,828	99.2%
Edmonton Oilers	Rexall Place	41	16,841	690,499	100.0%
San Jose Sharks	SAP Center at San Jose	41	16,746	686,623	95.4%
Anaheim Ducks	Honda Center	41	16,336	669,805	95.1%
Colorado Avalanche	Pepsi Center	40	16,206	648,232	90.0%
Florida Panthers	BB&T Center	41	15,384	630,746	90.3%
Winnipeg Jets	MTS Centre	41	15,294	627,054	101.9%
New Jersey Devils	Prudential Center	41	15,073	618,029	91.3%
Columbus Blue Jackets	Nationwide Arena	41	14,665	601,293	80.8%
New York Islanders	Barclays Center	41	13,626	558,705	86.2%
Arizona Coyotes	Gila River Arena	41	13,433	550,763	78.4%
Carolina Hurricanes	PNC Arena	41	10,102	500,363	65.6%
Total		1,227	17,483	21,451,041	

Notes:

- The New York Islanders moved from Nassau Coliseum to Barclays Center in Brooklyn, New York.
- Totals do not include three outdoor regular season games.
- The Boston Bruins played the Montreal Canadiens outdoors in the Winter Classic at Gillette Stadium in Foxborough, Massachusetts.
- The Minnesota Wild played the Chicago Blackhawks outdoors in the 2016 NHL Stadium Series at TCF Bank Stadium in Minneapolis, Minnesota.
- The Colorado Avalanche played the Detroit Red Wings outdoors in the 2016 NHL Stadium Series at Coors Field in Denver, Colorado.
- The Edmonton Oilers will move to Rogers Place the following season.

=== 2016–17 ===
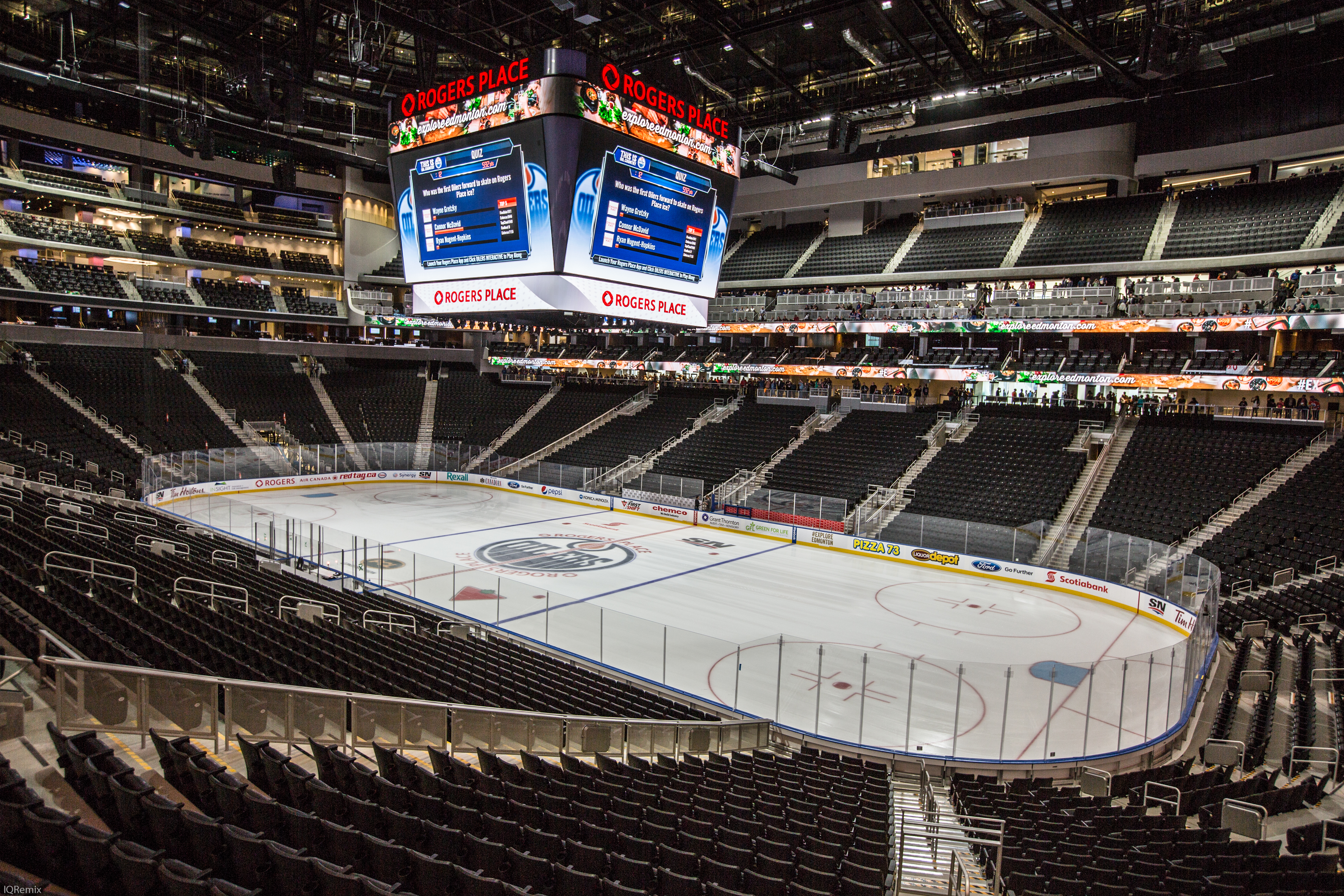
Rogers Place

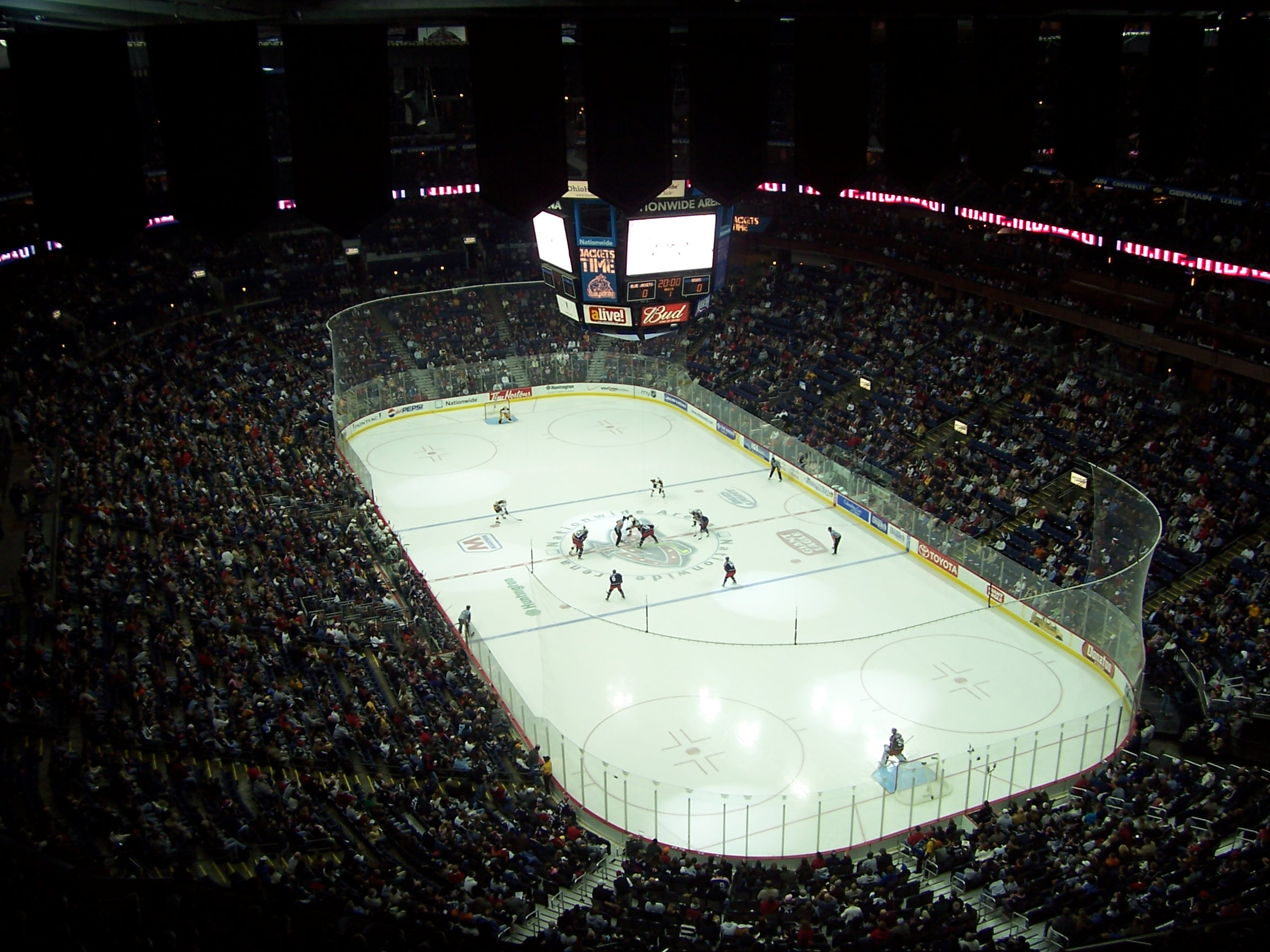
Nationwide Arena

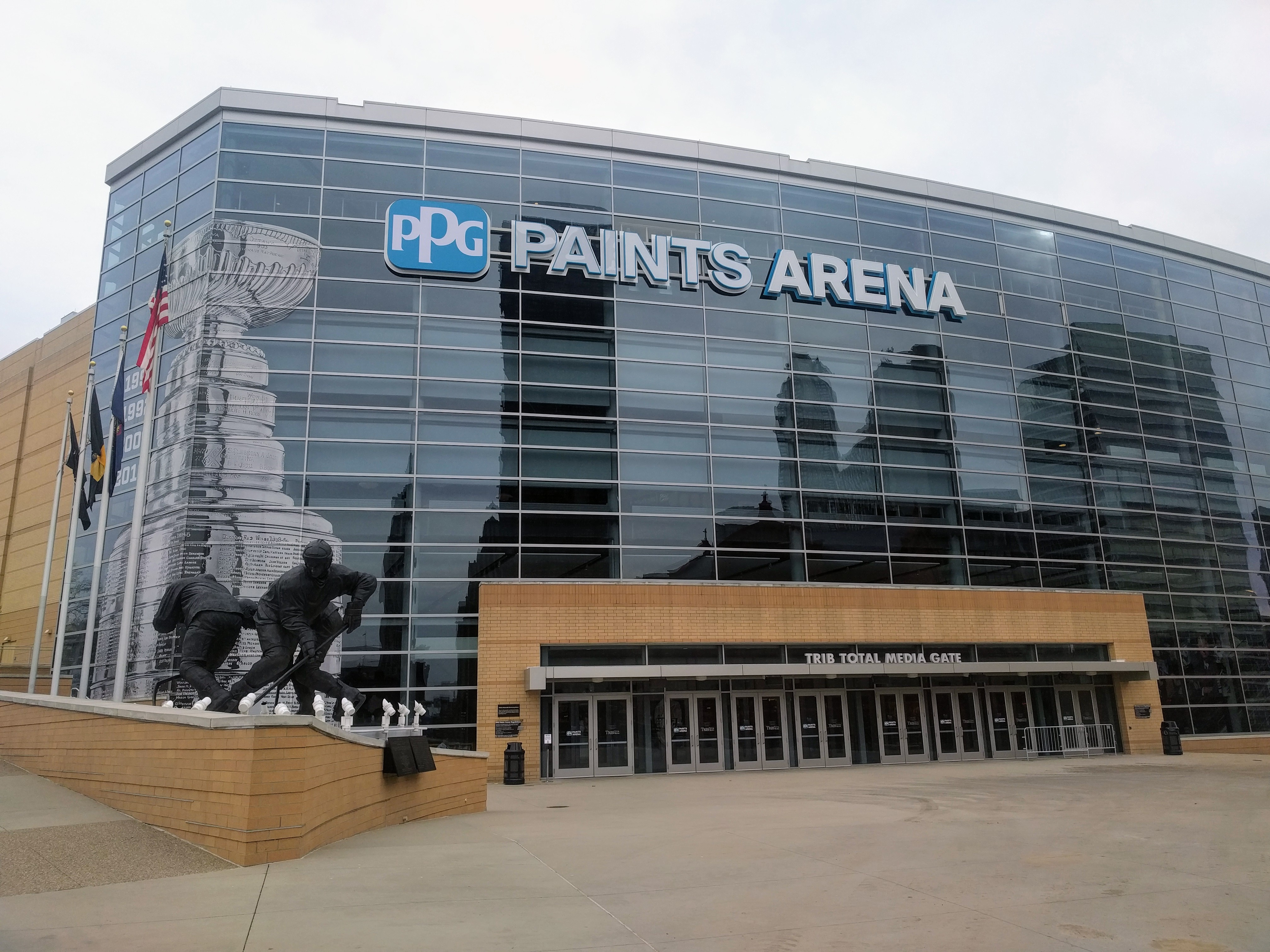
PPG Paints Arena

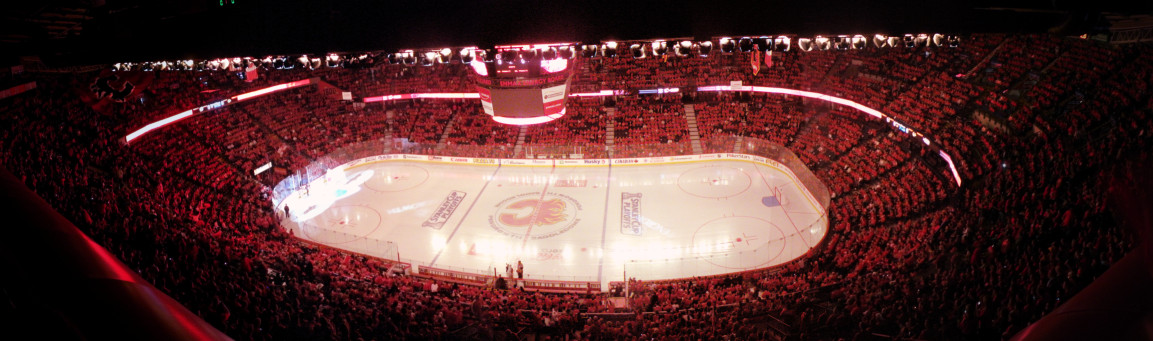
Scotiabank Saddledome

Team	Arena	Home games	Average attendance	Total attendance	Capacity percentage
Chicago Blackhawks	United Center	41	21,751	891,827	110.3%
Montreal Canadiens	Bell Centre	41	21,288	872,808	100.1%
Detroit Red Wings	Joe Louis Arena	41	20,027	821,107	100.0%
Pittsburgh Penguins	PPG Paints Arena	41	19,762	810,273	110.2%
Toronto Maple Leafs	Air Canada Centre	41	19,744	809,519	107.5%
Philadelphia Flyers	Wells Fargo Center	41	19,644	805,408	100.5%
St. Louis Blues	Scottrade Center	41	19,539	801,127	104.6%
Tampa Bay Lightning	Amalie Arena	41	19,092	782,772	100.0%
Minnesota Wild	Xcel Energy Center	41	19,070	781,879	106.2%
Calgary Flames	Scotiabank Saddledome	41	18,727	767,829	97.1%
Vancouver Canucks	Rogers Arena	41	18,509	758,891	97.9%
Washington Capitals	Verizon Center	41	18,506	758,746	100.0%
Edmonton Oilers	Rogers Place	41	18,347	752,227	98.4%
Los Angeles Kings	Staples Center	41	18,240	747,858	100.1%
Buffalo Sabres	KeyBank Center	41	18,141	743,819	94.0%
Dallas Stars	American Airlines Center	41	18,102	742,163	97.7%
New York Rangers	Madison Square Garden	41	18,020	738,828	100.1%
Boston Bruins	TD Garden	41	17,565	720,165	100.0%
San Jose Sharks	SAP Center at San Jose	41	17,508	717,833	99.7%
Nashville Predators	Bridgestone Arena	41	17,159	703,555	100.3%
Ottawa Senators	Canadian Tire Centre	41	16,744	686,534	87.4%
Anaheim Ducks	Honda Center	41	15,942	653,632	92.8%
Columbus Blue Jackets	Nationwide Arena	41	15,857	650,157	87.5%
Winnipeg Jets	MTS Centre	41	15,731	645,004	107.5%
Colorado Avalanche	Pepsi Center	41	14,835	608,252	82.4%
Florida Panthers	BB&T Center	41	14,620	599,447	85.8%
New Jersey Devils	Prudential Center	41	14,567	597,261	88.2%
New York Islanders	Barclays Center	41	13,101	537,149	82.9%
Arizona Coyotes	Gila River Arena	41	13,094	536,878	76.5%
Carolina Hurricanes	PNC Arena	41	11,776	482,829	63.0%
Total		1,230	18,117	21,525,777	

Notes:

- The Detroit Red Wings will move to Little Caesars Arena for the 2017–18 season.

=== 2017–18 ===
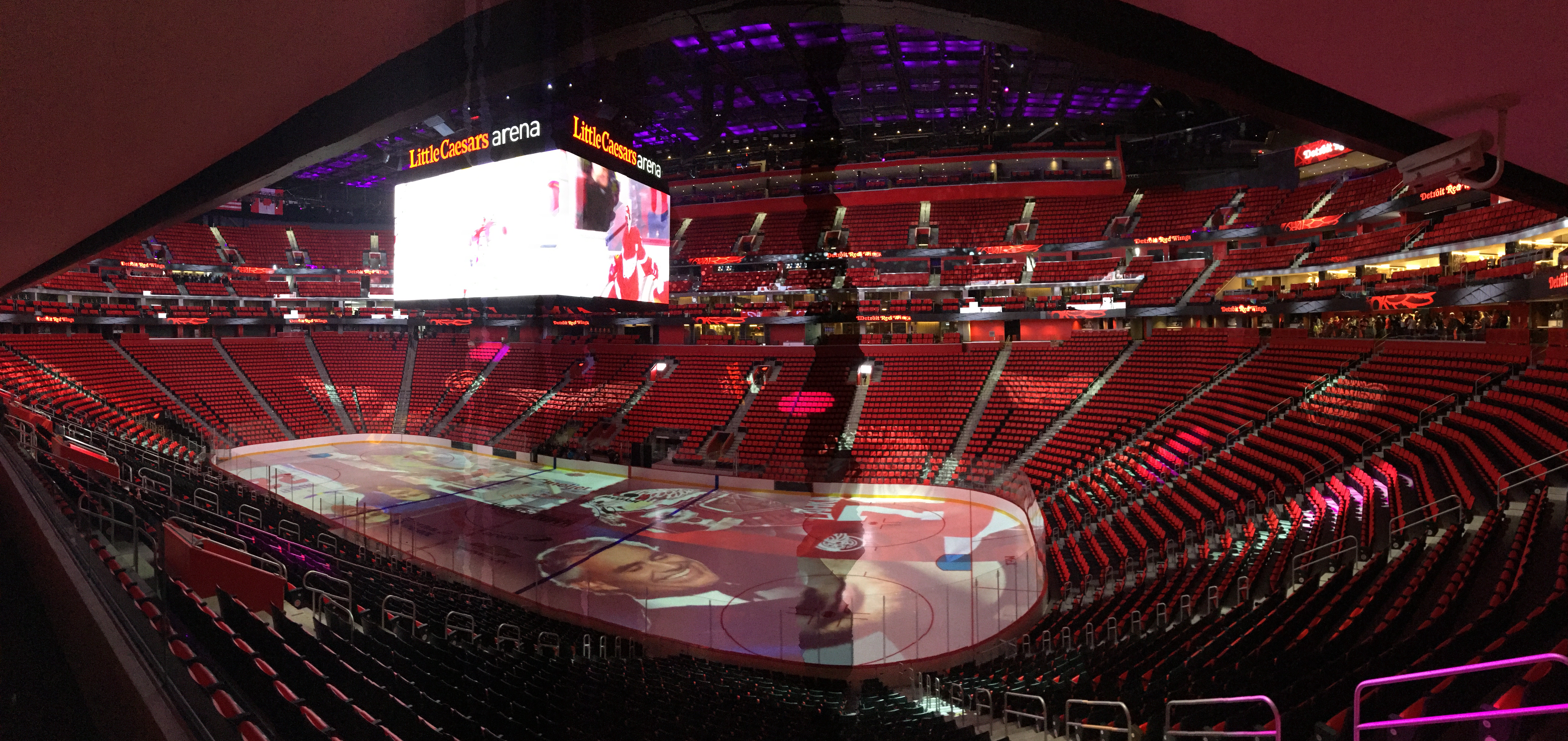
Little Caesars Arena

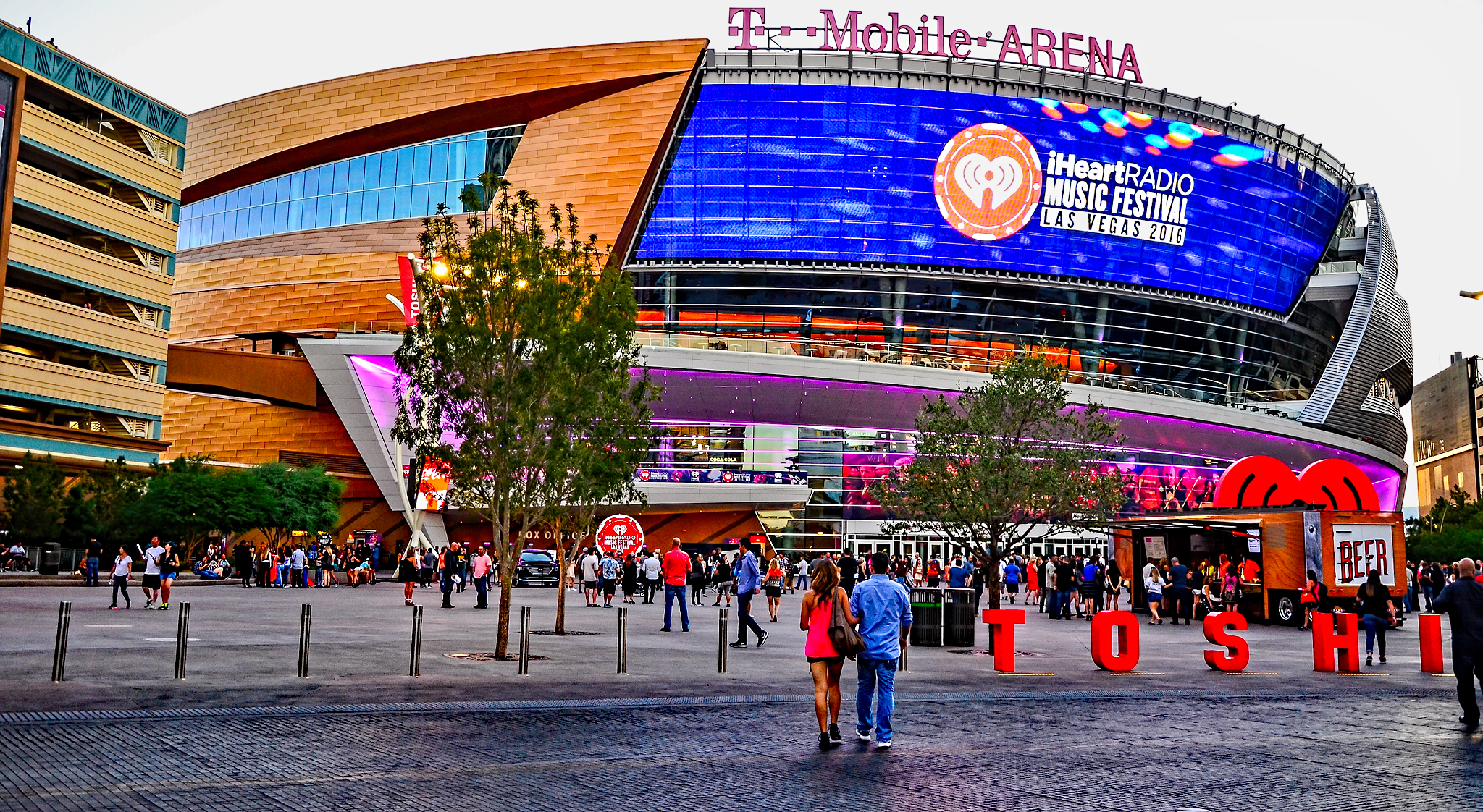
T-Mobile Arena

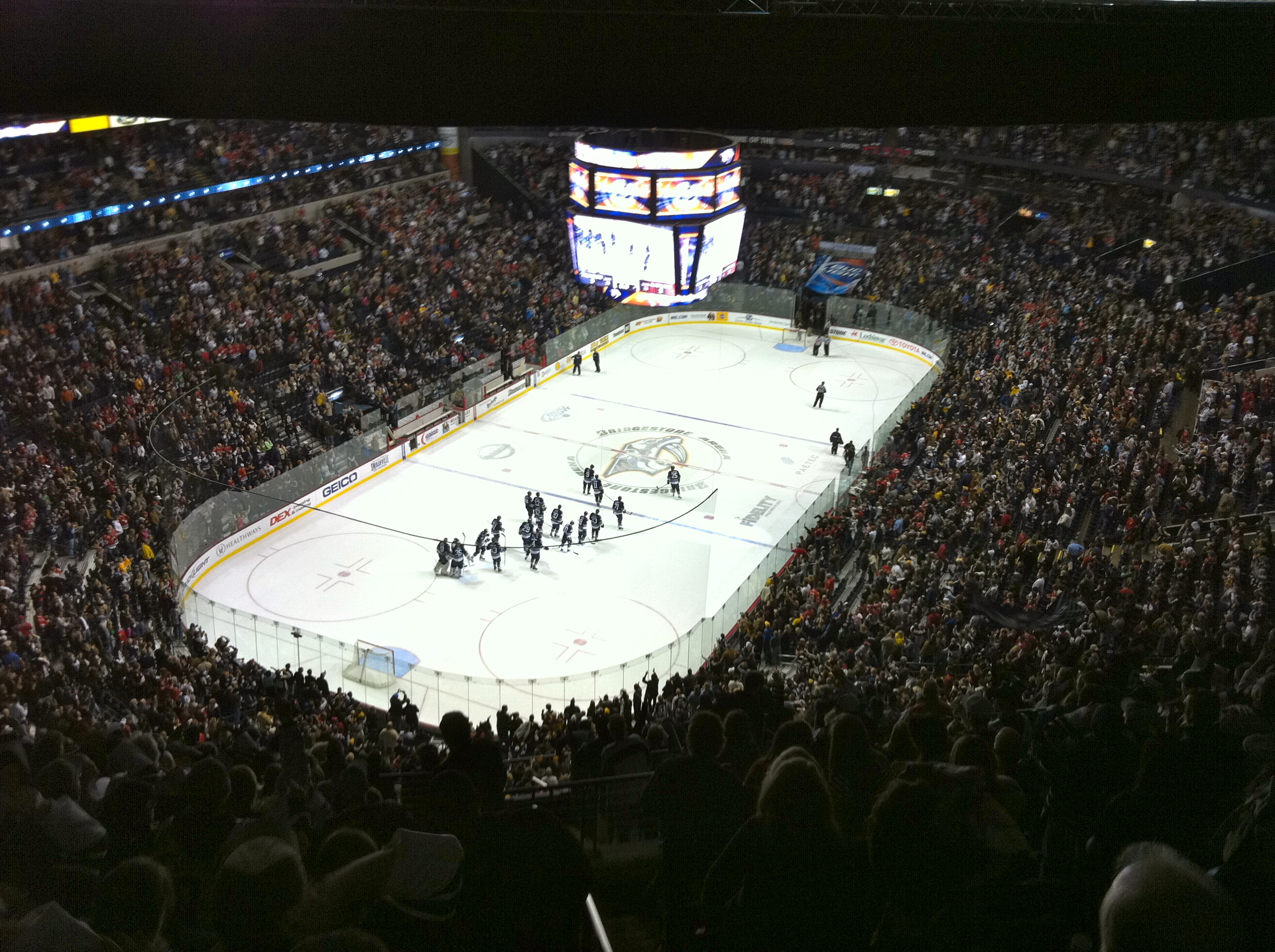
Bridgestone Arena

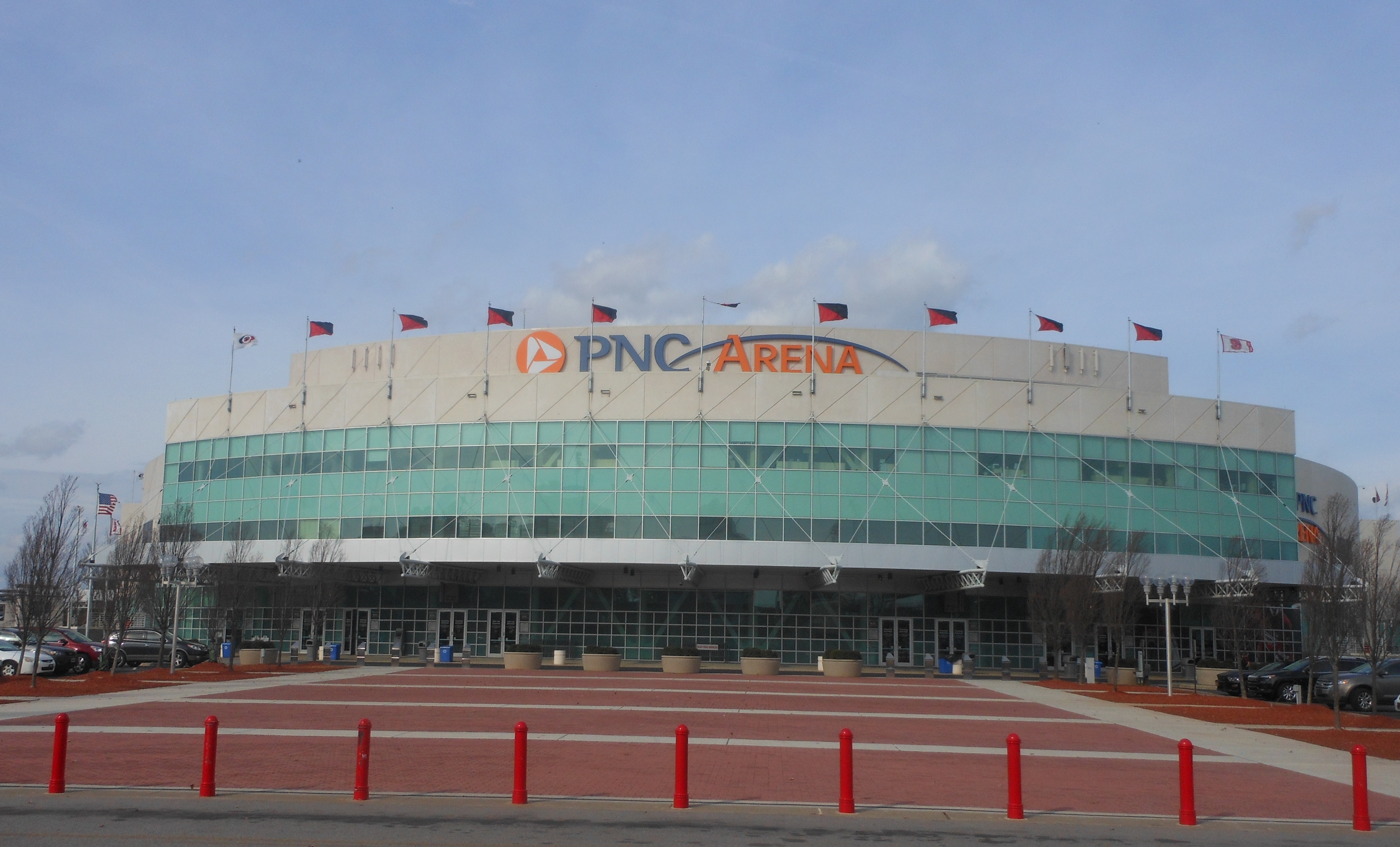
PNC Arena

Team	Arena	Home games	Average attendance	Total attendance	Capacity percentage
Chicago Blackhawks	United Center	41	21,653	887,794	109.8%
Montreal Canadiens	Bell Centre	41	21,299	873,283	99.9%
Philadelphia Flyers	Wells Fargo Center	41	19,517	800,214	99.9%
Detroit Red Wings	Little Caesars Arena	41	19,515	800,115	100.0%
Toronto Maple Leafs	Air Canada Centre	41	19,187	786,677	102.0%
Tampa Bay Lightning	Amalie Arena	41	19,092	782,772	100.0%
Minnesota Wild	Xcel Energy Center	41	19,036	780,501	106.0%
Calgary Flames	Scotiabank Saddledome	41	18,905	775,105	98.0%
Washington Capitals	Capital One Arena	40	18,774	740,240	104.0%
Pittsburgh Penguins	PPG Paints Arena	41	18,579	761,764	101.0%
Buffalo Sabres	KeyBank Center	41	18,563	719,283	99.8%
St. Louis Blues	Enterprise Center	41	18,356	752,624	95.9%
Edmonton Oilers	Rogers Place	41	18,347	752,227	98.4%
Los Angeles Kings	Staples Center	41	18,240	747,845	100.1%
Dallas Stars	American Airlines Center	41	18,110	742,511	97.7%
Vancouver Canucks	Rogers Arena	41	18,078	741,233	95.6%
Vegas Golden Knights	T-Mobile Arena	41	18,042	739,740	103.9%
New York Rangers	Madison Square Garden	41	17,851	731,899	99.1%
Boston Bruins	TD Garden	41	17,565	720,165	100.0%
San Jose Sharks	SAP Center	41	17,365	711,988	98.9%
Nashville Predators	Bridgestone Arena	41	17,307	709,597	101.1%
Columbus Blue Jackets	Nationwide Arena	41	16,659	683,034	91.8%
Anaheim Ducks	Honda Center	41	16,635	682,060	96.9%
Ottawa Senators	Canadian Tire Centre	41	15,829	648,996	91.1%
Colorado Avalanche	Pepsi Center	41	15,586	639,063	87.1%
Winnipeg Jets	Bell MTS Place	41	15,321	628,161	102.1%
New Jersey Devils	Prudential Center	41	15,200	623,240	92.0%
Florida Panthers	BB&T Center	41	13,851	567,897	81.3%
Carolina Hurricanes	PNC Arena	41	13,320	546,142	71.3%
Arizona Coyotes	Gila River Arena	41	13,040	534,670	76.2%
New York Islanders	Barclays Center	41	12,002	492,086	75.9%
Total		1,272	17,459	22,208,222	

Notes

- The Vegas Golden Knights began their inaugural season at T-Mobile Arena in Paradise, Nevada during the 2017-18 season.
- The Detroit Red Wings began play at Little Caesars Arena during the season.
- The Verizon Center was renamed Capital One Arena
- The MTS Centre was renamed Bell MTS Place
- Totals do not include three outdoor regular season games.
- The Ottawa Senators hosted the Montreal Canadiens during the NHL 100 Classic, played at TD Place Stadium in Lansdowne Park, Ottawa, on December 16, 2017.
- The Buffalo Sabres and New York Rangers played during the 2018 NHL Winter Classic, played at Citi Field in Queens, New York, on January 1, 2018.
- The Washington Capitals hosted the Toronto Maple Leafs during the 2018 NHL Stadium Series, played at Navy-Marine Corps Memorial Stadium in Annapolis, Maryland on March 3, 2018.

=== 2018–19 ===
Team	Arena	Home games	Average attendance	Total attendance	Capacity percentage
Chicago Blackhawks	United Center	40	21,399	855,972	108.5%
Montreal Canadiens	Bell Centre	41	21,046	862,914	98.9%
Philadelphia Flyers	Wells Fargo Center	40	19,141	765,622	99.14%
Toronto Maple Leafs	Scotiabank Arena	41	19,276	790,316	102.4%
Detroit Red Wings	Little Caesars Arena	41	19,120	783,958	98.0%
Tampa Bay Lightning	Amalie Arena	41	19,092	782,772	96.9%
Minnesota Wild	Xcel Energy Center	41	18,907	775,216	105.3%
Pittsburgh Penguins	PPG Paints Arena	41	18,565	761,203	101.0%
Washington Capitals	Capital One Arena	41	18,508	758,845	100.0%
Calgary Flames	Scotiabank Saddledome	41	18,501	758,550	95.9%
Edmonton Oilers	Rogers Place	41	18,347	752,227	98.4%
Vegas Golden Knights	T-Mobile Arena	41	18,318	751,067	105.5%
Dallas Stars	American Airlines Center	41	18,178	745,314	98.1%
Vancouver Canucks	Rogers Arena	41	18,022	738,918	95.3%
Los Angeles Kings	Staples Center	41	18,000	738,029	98.7%
Buffalo Sabres	KeyBank Center	41	17,908	734,238	93.9%
Boston Bruins	TD Garden	41	17,565	720,165	100.0%
Nashville Predators	Bridgestone Arena	41	17,445	715,276	101.9%
St. Louis Blues	Enterprise Center	41	17,361	711,823	90.7%
New York Rangers	Madison Square Garden	41	17,318	710,074	96.2%
San Jose Sharks	SAP Center	41	17,266	707,909	98.3%
Colorado Avalanche	Pepsi Center	41	17,132	702,446	95.1%
Anaheim Ducks	Honda Center	41	16,814	689,385	97.9%
Columbus Blue Jackets	Nationwide Arena	41	16,658	682,984	91.8%
Winnipeg Jets	Bell MTS Place	40	15,321	612,840	100.0%
New Jersey Devils	Prudential Center	40	14,904	596,166	90.3%
Ottawa Senators	Canadian Tire Centre	41	14,553	596,684	78.0%
Carolina Hurricanes	PNC Arena	41	14,322	587,222	76.7%
Arizona Coyotes	Gila River Arena	41	13,989	573,552	81.7%
Florida Panthers	BB&T Center	40	12,919	516,754	75.8%
New York Islanders	Barclays Center/Nassau Coliseum	41	12,442	510,150	78.9%
Total		1,267	17,377	22,002,081	

Notes

- The New York Islanders move half of their home schedule to their former arena, Nassau Coliseum, while continuing to play half their home games at Barclays Center.
- The Scottrade Center was renamed Enterprise Center.
- The Air Canada Centre was renamed Scotiabank Arena.
- Totals do not include two outdoor regular-season and international games.
- The Chicago Blackhawks hosted the Boston Bruins during the 2019 NHL Winter Classic, played at Notre Dame Stadium in Notre Dame, Indiana, on January 1, 2019.
- The Philadelphia Flyers hosted the Pittsburgh Penguins during the 2019 NHL Stadium Series, played at Lincoln Financial Field in Philadelphia on February 23, 2019.
- For the 2018 NHL Global Series, the New Jersey Devils and Edmonton Oilers played at the Scandinavium in Gothenburg, Sweden on October 6, 2018, with New Jersey acting as the home team for the game.
- For the 2018 NHL Global Series, the Florida Panthers and Winnipeg Jets played two games at Hartwall Arena in Helsinki, Finland on November 1 and 2, 2018, with both teams splitting the hosting duties as the home team.

=== 2019–20 ===
Team	Arena	Home games	Average attendance	Total attendance	Capacity percentage
Chicago Blackhawks	United Center	34	21,441	729,000	108.7%
Montreal Canadiens	Bell Centre	37	21,085	780,155	99.0%
Dallas Stars	American Airlines Center	34	20,326	691,084	113.0%
Toronto Maple Leafs	Scotiabank Arena	34	19,301	656,261	102.6%
Tampa Bay Lightning	Amalie Arena	34	18,922	643,375	99.9%
Calgary Flames	Scotiabank Saddledome	33	18,751	618,783	97.2%
Detroit Red Wings	Little Caesars Arena	37	18,716	692,515	95.9%
Colorado Avalanche	Pepsi Center	33	18,708	617,380	107.1%
Vancouver Canucks	Rogers Arena	35	18,679	653,790	98.8%
Washington Capitals	Capital One Arena	33	18,570	612,842	100.4%
Pittsburgh Penguins	PPG Paints Arena	35	18,537	648,813	100.8%
Philadelphia Flyers	Wells Fargo Center	35	18,390	643,677	94.4%
Vegas Golden Knights	T-Mobile Arena	37	18,310	677,499	105.4%
St. Louis Blues	Enterprise Center	35	18,096	633,360	100.0%
Boston Bruins	TD Garden	35	17,681	618,835	100.7%
Edmonton Oilers	Rogers Place	34	17,533	596,134	94.1%
Minnesota Wild	Xcel Energy Center	35	17,472	594,071	97.3%
Nashville Predators	Bridgestone Arena	35	17,407	609,253	101.7%
New York Rangers	Madison Square Garden	36	17,206	619,450	95.6%
Buffalo Sabres	KeyBank Center	35	17,167	600,858	90.7%
Los Angeles Kings	Staples Center	34	16,916	575,151	92.8%
Carolina Hurricanes	PNC Arena	33	16,905	540,975	90.5%
Columbus Blue Jackets	Nationwide Arena	36	16,898	608,354	93.1%
San Jose Sharks	SAP Center	36	16,427	591,393	93.5%
Anaheim Ducks	Honda Center	36	15,846	570,490	92.3%
Winnipeg Jets	Bell MTS Place	37	15,794	584,389	108.2%
New Jersey Devils	Prudential Center	34	14,899	506,570	90.2%
Arizona Coyotes	Gila River Arena	33	14,605	481,989	85.3%
Florida Panthers	BB&T Center	35	14,104	493,671	82.8%
New York Islanders	Barclays Center/Nassau Coliseum	35	12,810	448,369	81.3%
Ottawa Senators	Canadian Tire Centre	37	12,618	466,876	67.6%
Total		1,082	17,380	18,805,362	

=== 2021–22 ===
	Team	Arena	Home games	Average attendance	Total attendance	Capacity percentage
1.	Tampa Bay Lightning	Amalie Arena	41	19,092	782,772	100.0
2.	Washington Capitals	Capital One Arena	41	18,573	761,493	100.0
3.	Minnesota Wild	Xcel Energy Center	41	18,542	760,226	103.2
4.	Nashville Predators	Bridgestone Arena	41	18,495	758,317	100.6
5.	Chicago Blackhawks	United Center	41	18,489	758,082	93.8
6.	Vegas Golden Knights	T-Mobile Arena	41	18,100	742,124	104.2
7.	Dallas Stars	American Airlines Center	41	17,896	733,769	96.6
8.	Boston Bruins	TD Garden	41	17,850	731,850	100.0
9.	St. Louis Blues	Enterprise Center	41	17,716	726,392	97.9
10.	Pittsburgh Penguins	PPG Paints Arena	41	17,684	725,046	97.2
11.	Colorado Avalanche	Pepsi Center	41	17,498	717,458	97.2
12.	Vancouver Canucks (Note: Capacity partially reduced due to government COVID-19 restrictions)	Rogers Arena	41	17,285	708,711	91.4
13.	Carolina Hurricanes	PNC Arena	41	17,210	705,611	92.1
14.	Seattle Kraken	Climate Pledge Arena	41	17,151	703,191	100.3
15.	Detroit Red Wings	Little Caesars Arena	41	16,984	696,367	87.0
16.	New York Islanders	UBS Arena	41	16,942	694,658	99.0
17.	New York Rangers	Madison Square Garden	41	16,839	690,411	93.5
18.	Philadelphia Flyers	Wells Fargo Center	41	16,540	678,163	84.7
19.	Columbus Blue Jackets	Nationwide Arena	41	16,237	665,722	89.5
20.	Toronto Maple Leafs	Scotiabank Arena	41	15,586	639,039	82.8
21.	Montreal Canadiens	Bell Centre	41	15,495	635,297	73.4
22.	Edmonton Oilers	Rogers Place	41	14,927	612,010	81.4
23.	Los Angeles Kings	Staples Center	41	14,828	607,977	81.3
24.	Florida Panthers	BB&T Center	41	14,811	607,269	86.9
25.	Calgary Flames	Scotiabank Saddledome	41	14,284	585,644	74.1
26.	Anaheim Ducks	Honda Center	41	13,083	536,403	76.2
27.	New Jersey Devils	Prudential Center	41	12,744	522,519	77.2
28.	Winnipeg Jets	Bell MTS Place	41	12,716	521,357	83.0
29.	San Jose Sharks	SAP Center	41	12,573	515,533	71.6
30.	Arizona Coyotes	Gila River Arena	41	11,601	475,659	67.7
31.	Buffalo Sabres	KeyBank Center	41	9,997	409,908	53.7
32.	Ottawa Senators	Canadian Tire Centre	41	9,155	375,368	49.1
	Total		1,312	15,841	20,784,346	

=== 2023–24 ===
	Team	Arena	Home games	Average attendance	Total attendance	Capacity percentage
1.	Montreal Canadiens	Bell Centre	41	21,099	865,074	99.9%
2.	Edmonton Oilers	Rogers Place	41	19,173	786,091	104.5%
3.	Tampa Bay Lightning	Amalie Arena	41	19,092	782,772	100.0%
4.	Detroit Red Wings	Little Caesars Arena	41	18,980	778,167	97.2%
5.	Chicago Blackhawks	United Center	41	18,836	772,257	95.5%
6.	Vancouver Canucks	Rogers Arena	41	18,826	771,876	99.6%
7.	Carolina Hurricanes	PNC Arena	41	18,798	770,736	100.5%
8.	Toronto Maple Leafs	Scotiabank Arena	41	18,789	770,342	99.8%
9.	Florida Panthers	Amerant Bank Arena	41	18,632	763,931	96.8%
10.	Dallas Stars	American Airlines Center	41	18,532	759,812	100.0%
11.	Minnesota Wild	Xcel Energy Center	41	18,526	759,586	103.2%
12.	Philadelphia Flyers	Wells Fargo Center	41	18,438	755,962	96.2%
13.	Vegas Golden Knights	T-Mobile Arena	41	18,139	743,680	103.7%
14.	Colorado Avalanche	Ball Arena	41	18,103	742,206	100.5%
15.	New York Islanders	UBS Arena	41	18,099	742,042	104.9%
16.	St. Louis Blues	Enterprise Center	41	18,084	741,461	99.9%
17.	New York Rangers	Madison Square Garden	41	17,983	737,296	99.9%
18.	Los Angeles Kings	Crypto.com Arena	41	17,945	735,725	98.4%
19.	Pittsburgh Penguins	PPG Paints Arena	41	17,909	734,252	98.5%
20.	Seattle Kraken	Climate Pledge Arena	41	17,887	733,353	104.3%
21.	Boston Bruins	TD Garden	41	17,850	731,850	100.0%
22.	Washington Capitals	Capital One Arena	41	17,841	731,483	96.1%
23.	New Jersey Devils	Prudential Center	41	17,598	721,529	106.6%
24.	Ottawa Senators	Canadian Tire Centre	41	17,581	720,838	94.2%
25.	Calgary Flames	Scotiabank Saddledome	41	17,501	717,561	90.7%
26.	Nashville Predators	Bridgestone Arena	41	17,306	709,559	100.9%
27.	Columbus Blue Jackets	Nationwide Arena	41	17,016	697,667	92.0%
28.	Buffalo Sabres	KeyBank Center	41	15,981	655,203	83.8%
29.	Anaheim Ducks	Honda Center	41	15,687	643,150	91.3%
30.	San Jose Sharks	SAP Center	41	13,559	555,934	77.8%
31.	Winnipeg Jets	Canada Life Centre	41	13,490	553,107	88.0%
32.	Arizona Coyotes	Mullett Arena	41	4,600	188,600	100.0%
	Total		1,312	17,434	22,873,102	

=== 2024–25 ===
#	Team	Average attendance
1.	Montreal Canadiens	21,105
2.	Detroit Red Wings	19,345
3.	Chicago Blackhawks	19,130
4.	Tampa Bay Lightning	19,092
5.	Florida Panthers	19,059
6.	Columbus Blue Jackets	18,935
7.	Vancouver Canucks	18,880
8.	Toronto Maple Leafs	18,829
9.	Carolina Hurricanes	18,795
10.	Philadelphia Flyers	18,525
11.	Minnesota Wild	18,430
12.	Dallas Stars	18,392
13.	Edmonton Oilers	18,347
14.	Washington Capitals	18,244
15.	Colorado Avalanche	18,067
16.	Vegas Golden Knights	17,975
17.	New York Rangers	17,861
18.	Boston Bruins	17,852
19.	St. Louis Blues	17,724
20.	Calgary Flames	17,655
21.	Ottawa Senators	17,308
22.	Nashville Predators	17,212
23.	Los Angeles Kings	17,196
24.	Seattle Kraken	17,151
25.	Pittsburgh Penguins	16,635
26.	New Jersey Devils	16,154
27.	Buffalo Sabres	15,998
28.	New York Islanders	15,979
29.	Anaheim Ducks	15,806
30.	Winnipeg Jets	14,366
31.	San Jose Sharks	14,219
32.	Utah Mammoth	11,131

== See also ==
- List of sports attendance figures
- List of ice hockey arenas by capacity
