= Major League Soccer attendance =

Attendance figures for Major League Soccer in the United States and Canada

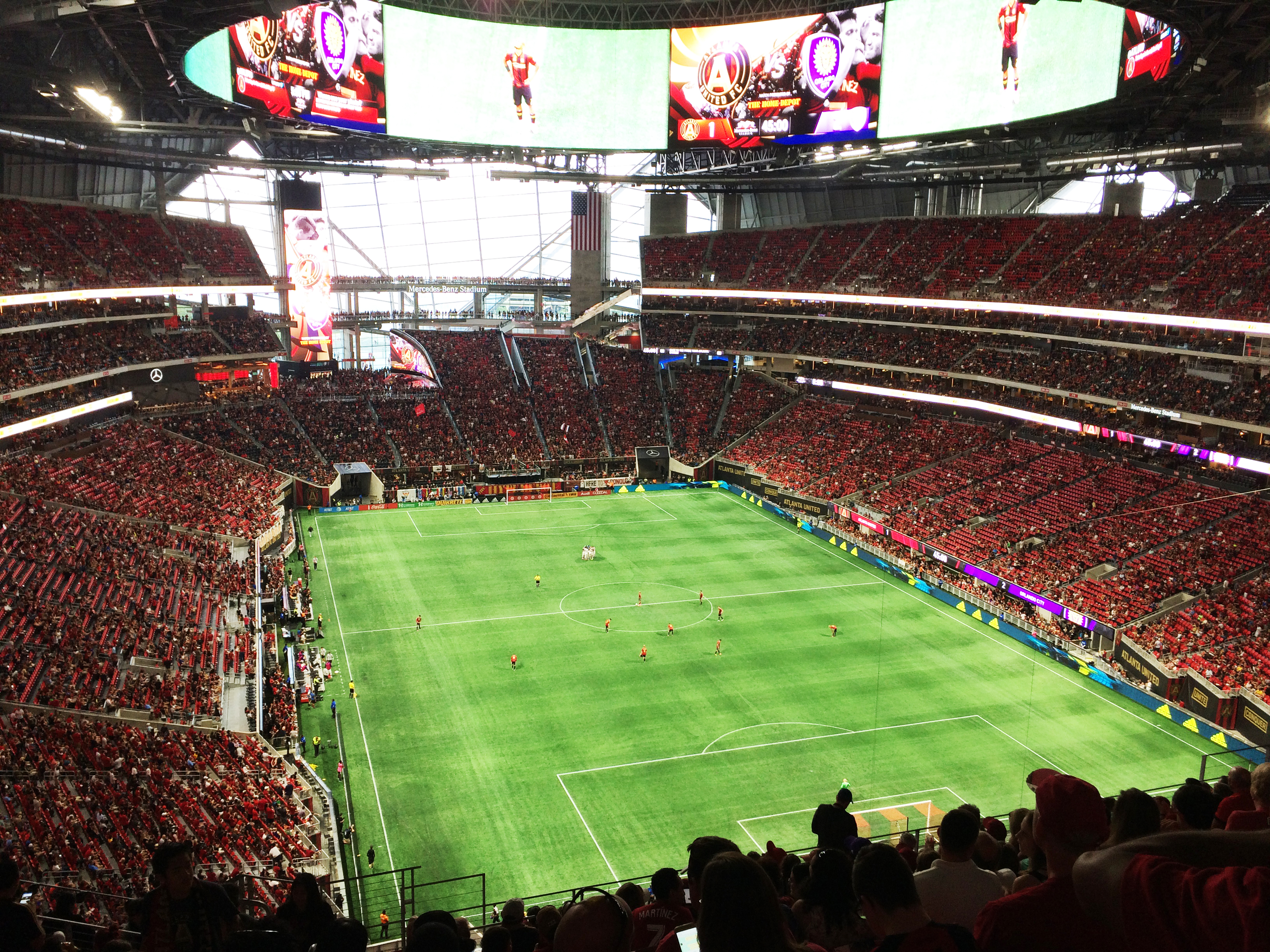
Except for 2020, Atlanta United has been the highest-attended team since it entered MLS in 2017.

Major League Soccer is the top-flight professional soccer league in the United States and Canada. Competition began in 1996 and attendance has been increasing rapidly since the early 2000s, making it one of the fastest-growing sports leagues in the world. On average, MLS draws to its games the fourth largest crowds of any professional sports league in North America, ranking behind the National Football League, Major League Baseball and the Canadian Football League. Similar to the National Hockey League and Major League Baseball, attendance is based on the number of tickets distributed.

During the 2025 regular season, MLS averaged 21,988 spectators per match, 5 percent below the record set in 2024 and its lowest average since 2022. The league nevertheless surpassed 11 million spectators for the second consecutive season. Atlanta United led the league with an average of 43,992, followed by Seattle Sounders FC at 30,993, Charlotte FC at 30,664, and expansion club San Diego FC at 28,064. Nineteen clubs recorded year-over-year declines and eight recorded increases. San Jose Earthquakes led the increases at 12 percent, while FC Dallas declined 42 percent amid a stadium renovation that closed its east stand.

On July 4, 2023, the largest standalone attendance in MLS history for a single match (82,110 spectators) was reached at the Rose Bowl where the LA Galaxy defeated Los Angeles FC 2–1. The highest average attendance during a regular season was reached in 2018 when Atlanta United matches were attended by an average of 53,002 spectators.

== 2025 regular season ==
This table shows the average attendances of the 30 MLS clubs during the 2025 regular season. It also includes the average attendances of the previous 2024 regular season, the percentage changes in average attendance from 2024 to 2025, the names of all home venues, their respective capacities, and the percentages of those capacities filled by each team's average attendance during the 2025 regular season. A few teams have played some games at venues other than their usual ones. In these cases, each attendance percentage has been calculated based on the capacity of the team’s regular stadium.

	Team	2025 average	2024 average	Percent change	Stadium	Capacity (unrestricted)	Percent capacity
1	Atlanta United FC	43,992	46,831	-6.1%	Mercedes-Benz Stadium †	42,500 (at least 73,019)	103.5% (60.2%)
2	Seattle Sounders FC	30,993	30,754	+0.8%	Lumen Field †	37,722 (68,740)	82.2% (45.1%)
3	Charlotte FC	30,664	33,383	-8.1%	Bank of America Stadium †	38,000 (74,867)	80.7% (41%)
4	San Diego FC	28,064	-	-	Snapdragon Stadium	35,000	80.2%
5	Nashville SC	26,433	28,599	-7.6%	Geodis Park	30,109	87.8%
6	FC Cincinnati	24,668	25,237	-2.3%	TQL Stadium	26,000	94.9%
7	New England Revolution	24,477	29,262	-16.4%	Gillette Stadium †	20,000 (65,878)	122.4% (37.2%)
8	Chicago Fire FC	23,450	21,328	+9.9%	Soldier Field (Note: Chicago Fire played 3 home games at the SeatGeek Stadium in Bridgeview, Illinois.)†	24,955 (61,500)	94% (38.1%)
9	Columbus Crew	22,795	20,646	+10.4%	Lower.com Field (Note: The home game against Lionel Messi’s Inter Miami CF was played at Huntington Bank Field in front of 60,614 spectators.)	20,371	111.9%
10	St. Louis City SC	22,423	22,423	0%	Energizer Park	22,423	100%
11	Portland Timbers	22,405	22,485	-0.4%	Providence Park	25,218	88.8%
12	New York City FC	21,971	21,765	+0.9%	Yankee Stadium (Note: NYCFC played 12 games at Yankee Stadium and 5 at Citi Field.) †	30,321 (47,309)	72.5% (46.4%)
13	Los Angeles FC	21,931	22,122	-0.9%	BMO Stadium	22,000	99.7%
14	Vancouver Whitecaps FC	21,806	26,121	-16.5%	BC Place †	22,120 (54,500)	98.6% (40%)
15	Toronto FC	21,353	25,681	-16.9%	BMO Field	27,980	76.3%
16	Austin FC	20,738	20,738	0%	Q2 Stadium	20,738	100%
17	Orlando City SC	20,573	22,805	-9.8%	Inter&Co Stadium	25,500	80.7%
18	Inter Miami CF	20,410	20,979	-2.7%	Chase Stadium	21,550	94.7%
19	LA Galaxy	20,067	26,136	-23.2%	Dignity Health Sports Park	27,000	74.3%
20	Real Salt Lake	19,776	20,295	-2.6%	America First Field	20,213	97.8%
21	New York Red Bulls	19,710	19,479	+1.2%	Sports Illustrated Stadium	25,000	78.8%
22	San Jose Earthquakes	19,614	17,501	+ 12.1%	PayPal Park (Note: The home game against LAFC was played at Levi's Stadium in front of 50,978 spectators. Another home game, this time against LA Galaxy, was attended at Stanford Stadium by 42,881 spectators.)	18,000	109%
23	Minnesota United FC	19,247	19,597	-1.8%	Allianz Field	19,400	99.2%
24	Philadelphia Union	18,331	18,845	-2.7%	Subaru Park	18,500	99.1%
25	Houston Dynamo FC	17,693	17,038	+3.8%	Shell Energy Stadium	22,039	80.3%
26	Sporting Kansas City	16,604	21,193	-21.7%	Children's Mercy Park	18,467	89.9%
27	D.C. United	16,389	18,137	-9.6%	Audi Field	20,000	81.9%
28	CF Montréal	16,162	19,619	-17.6%	Saputo Stadium	19,619	82.4%
29	Colorado Rapids	15,890	15,686	+1.3%	Dick's Sporting Goods Park	18,061	88%
30	FC Dallas	11,013	19,096	-42.3%	Toyota Stadium (Note: During the current reconstruction of this stadium, its seating capacity has been limited to about 11,000.)	11,000	100.1%

Key
† The stadium capacity was reduced for soccer matches

Notes

Some clubs have attendances over 100% capacity. This is because the limited capacities of their usual venues are lifted for certain matches by opening additional sections. Other clubs use larger venues for certain matches that attract large attendances.

== Season averages ==
=== Yearly statistics ===
Season	Total attendance	Games	Average	YoY change	Highest average		Lowest average		Ref.
Season	Total attendance	Games	Average	YoY change	Attendance	Team	Attendance	Team	Ref.
1996	2,785,001	160	17,406	-	28,916	Los Angeles Galaxy	10,213	Colorado Rapids	
1997	2,336,529	160	14,603	-16.1%	21,298	New England Revolution	9,058	Kansas City Wizards	
1998	2,747,897	192	14,312	-2.0%	21,784	Los Angeles Galaxy	8,073	Kansas City Wizards	
1999	2,742,102	192	14,282	-0.2%	17,696	Columbus Crew	8,183	Kansas City Wizards	
2000	2,641,086	192	13,756	-3.7%	20,400	Los Angeles Galaxy	7,460	Miami Fusion	
2001	2,363,889	158	14,961	+8.8%	21,518	D.C. United	9,112	Kansas City Wizards	
2002	2,214,978	140	15,821	+5.7%	20,690	Colorado Rapids	11,150	San Jose Earthquakes	
2003	2,234,747	150	14,898	-5.8%	21,983	Los Angeles Galaxy	7,906	Dallas Burn	
2004	2,333,797	150	15,559	+4.4%	23,809	Los Angeles Galaxy	9,088	Dallas Burn	
2005	2,900,716	192	15,108	-2.9%	24,204	Los Angeles Galaxy	9,691	Kansas City Wizards	
2006	2,976,787	192	15,504	+2.6%	20,814	Los Angeles Galaxy	11,083	Kansas City Wizards	
2007	3,270,210	195	16,770	+8.2%	24,252	Los Angeles Galaxy	11,586	Kansas City Wizards	
2008	3,456,641	210	16,460	-1.8%	26,008	Los Angeles Galaxy	10,685	Kansas City Wizards	
2009	3,609,048	225	16,040	-2.6%	30,942	Seattle Sounders FC	9,883	FC Dallas	
2010	4,002,053	240	16,675	+4.0%	36,173	Seattle Sounders FC	9,659	San Jose Earthquakes	
2011	5,468,849	306	17,872	+7.2%	38,496	Seattle Sounders FC	11,858	San Jose Earthquakes	
2012	6,074,729	323	18,807	+5.2%	43,144	Seattle Sounders FC	13,056	Chivas USA	
2013	6,005,991	323	18,594	-1.3%	44,038	Seattle Sounders FC	8,366	Chivas USA	
2014	6,184,350	323	19,147	+3.0%	43,734	Seattle Sounders FC	7,063	Chivas USA	
2015	7,329,829	340	21,558	+12.6%	44,247	Seattle Sounders FC	15,657	Colorado Rapids	
2016	7,375,287	340	21,692	+0.6%	42,636	Seattle Sounders FC	14,094	FC Dallas	
2017	8,267,534	374	22,106	+1.9%	48,200	Atlanta United FC	15,122	FC Dallas	
2018	8,552,503	391	21,873	-1.1%	53,002	Atlanta United FC	12,447	Columbus Crew SC	
2019	8,702,674	408	21,330	-2.5%	52,510	Atlanta United FC	12,324	Chicago Fire	
2020	637,020	292	2,182	N/A	6,101	Seattle Sounders FC	0	Multiple teams	
2021	6,213,022	459	13,536	N/A	43,964	Atlanta United FC	647	CF Montréal	
2022	10,011,578	476	21,033	-1.4%	47,116	Atlanta United FC	12,637	Inter Miami CF	
2023	10,900,804	493	22,111	+5.1%	47,526	Atlanta United FC	15,029	Houston Dynamo FC	
2024	11,454,205	493	23,234	+5.1%	46,831	Atlanta United FC	15,686	Colorado Rapids	
2025	11,213,880	510	21,988	-5.4%	43,992	Atlanta United FC	11,013 (Note: Reduced capacity due to stadium renovation.)	FC Dallas	

Key
Record high
Record low
Affected by the COVID-19 pandemic

Notes

- This table is mainly based on the "MLS Fact and Record Book".
- For most of the seasons the differences between the numbers in the "Fact and Record Book" and other sources are small.
- Regarding the year 2020, it seems that there is an error in the number of games (26) stated in "MLS Fact and Record Book".
- Another MLS document, the "2020 MLS Standings and Leaders", states that there were up to 292 regular season games.
- Therefore, the number of games and the average for 2020 are from the "2020 MLS Standings and Leaders".
- Regarding 2021, the numbers in the "MLS Fact and Record Book" and those in yet another MLS document, the "MLS Media Resources: 2021 Stat Sheets" are rather different. The "Attendance", the "Games" and "Average" have been taken from this 2021 source.
- The drop in number of games and total attendance from 2000 to 2002, and the corresponding increase in average attendance, is attributable to league contraction, when MLS folded the Miami Fusion and Tampa Bay Mutiny.
- Several seasons saw increases in total attendance, despite drops in average attendance. One such case was due to expansion of the regular-season schedule; all others were due to league expansion.
- The 2020 and 2021 seasons were affected by the COVID-19 pandemic, which restricted many matches to zero spectators.

=== Regular season and playoffs statistics ===
Season	MLS regular season			MLS Cup playoffs			MLS complete season		
Season	Total Attendance	Games	Average	Total Attendance	Games	Average	Total Attendance	Games	Average
1996	2,785,001	160	17,406	300,435	17	17,673	3,085,436	177	17,432
1997	2,336,529	160	14,603	208,192	13	16,015	2,544,721	173	14,709
1998	2,747,897	192	14,312	249,968	14	17,855	2,997,865	206	14,553
1999	2,742,102	192	14,282	257,417	16	16,089	2,999,519	208	14,421
2000	2,641,086	192	13,756	203,548	17	11,973	2,844,634	209	13,611
2001	2,363,889	158	14,961	212,485	18	11,805	2,576,374	176	14,638
2002	2,214,978	140	15,821	235,827	17	13,872	2,450,805	157	15,610
2003	2,234,747	150	14,898	164,758	11	14,978	2,399,505	161	14,904
2004	2,333,797	150	15,559	153,691	11	13,972	2,487,488	161	15,450
2005	2,900,716	192	15,108	158,285	11	14,390	3,059,001	203	15,069
2006	2,976,787	192	15,504	166,972	11	15,179	3,143,759	203	15,486
2007	3,270,210	195	16,770	217,479	11	19,771	3,487,689	206	16,931
2008	3,456,641	210	16,460	181,382	11	16,489	3,638,023	221	16,462
2009	3,609,048	225	16,040	259,149	11	23,559	3,868,197	236	16,391
2010	4,002,053	240	16,675	214,885	11	19,535	4,216,938	251	16,801
2011	5,468,849	306	17,872	265,582	13	20,429	5,734,431	319	17,976
2012	6,074,729	323	18,807	335,343	15	22,356	6,410,072	338	18,965
2013	6,005,991	323	18,594	328,402	15	21,893	6,334,393	338	18,741
2014	6,184,350	323	19,147	354,489	15	23,633	6,538,839	338	19,346
2015	7,329,829	340	21,558	388,289	17	22,841	7,718,118	357	21,619
2016	7,375,287	340	21,692	472,461	17	27,792	7,847,748	357	21,982
2017	8,267,534	374	22,106	453,781	17	26,693	8,721,315	391	22,305
2018	8,552,503	391	21,873	494,511	17	29,089	9,047,014	408	22,174
2019	8,702,674	408	21,330	442,476	13	34,037	9,145,150	421	21,722
2020	637,020	292	2,182	—	—	—	637,020	292	2,182
2021	6,213,022	459	13,536	299,891	13	23,069	6,512,913	472	13,799
2022	10,011,578	476	21,033	263,192	13	20,246	10,274,770	489	21,012
2023	10,900,804	493	22,111	661,145	28	23,612	11,561,949	521	22,192
2024	11,454,205	493	23,234	697,534	29	24,053	12,151,739	522	23,279
2025	11,213,880	510	21,988	732,916	30	24,431	11,946,796	540	22,124

Key
Record high
Record low
Affected by the COVID-19 pandemic

Notes

- This table is primarily based on the "MLS Fact and Record Book".
- See the notes below the previous chart regarding the numbers of the 2020 and 2021 seasons.
- The format for the MLS Cup Playoffs has changed several times during its history, resulting in inconsistent numbers of matches played.
- The 2020 playoffs were affected by the COVID-19 pandemic, which restricted many matches to zero spectators. Only two matches were played in front of spectators, each with a maximum capacity of 1,500 people.

== Comparison to other North American leagues ==
The following table compares the regular-season average attendance of MLS with the averages of other major professional sports leagues in North America. All these leagues have season average attendances of at least 15,000 spectators per game.

	League	Sport	Season	Teams	Games	Total attendance	Average attendance	Average attendance YoY change	Ref.
1	National Football League	American football	2025	32	265 (Note: 7 matches of the 2025 regular season were played abroad. Only the 265 played in the U.S. are being considered.)	18,301,572	69,063	-572	
2	Major League Baseball	Baseball	2025	30	2,430	71,409,522	29,387	+13	
3	Canadian Football League	Canadian football	2025	9	81	1,857,411 (Note: Total attendance for the CFL is an approximate figure obtained by multiplying the number of matches by the reported average attendance.)	22,931	+136	
4	Major League Soccer	Soccer	2025	30	510	11,213,880	21,988	-1,246	
5	Liga MX	Soccer	2025–26	18	306	6,611,808 (Note: Total attendance for the Liga MX 2025–26 season is the result of combining the number of espectators for the Apertura 2025 (3,270,879) and Clausura 2026 (3,340,929) tournaments.)	21,607	+775	
6	National Basketball Association	Basketball	2025–26	30	1,225 (Note: Excludes 5 regular-season games: 3 played abroad and the 2 semifinals of the NBA Cup. The NBA Cup championship game does not count for the regular season.)	22,182,648	18,108	-39	
7	National Hockey League	Ice hockey	2025–26	32	1,312	23,158,578	17,651	+110	

== Comparison to other soccer leagues ==
The following table compares the regular-season average attendance of MLS with the averages of other major soccer leagues in the world. All these leagues have season average attendances of at least 15,000 spectators per game.

	League	Country	Confederation	Season	Teams	Games	Total attendance	Average attendance	Ref.
1	1. Bundesliga	Germany	UEFA	2025–26	18	306	12,951,926	42,327	
2	Premier League	England / Wales	UEFA	2025–26	20	380	15,505,486	41,569	
3	La Liga	Spain	UEFA	2025–26	20	380	11,693,679	31,018	
4	Serie A	Italy	UEFA	2025–26	20	380	11,680,772	30,739	
5	2. Bundesliga	Germany	UEFA	2025–26	18	306	8,763,357	28,638	
6	Ligue 1	France / Monaco	UEFA	2025–26	18	306	8,441,928 (Note: Total attendance for the Ligue 1 is an approximate figure obtained by multiplying the number of matches by the reported average attendance.)	27,588	
7	Super League	China	AFC	2025	16	240	6,180,990	25,754	
8	Série A	Brazil	CONMEBOL	2025	20	380	9,706,008	25,542	
9	Primera División	Argentina	CONMEBOL	2025	30	510	N/A	23,846 (Note: This number has been deduced from the data provided to AFA, the Argentinian Football Federation, by only 25 out of the 30 clubs.)	
10	EFL Championship	England / Wales	UEFA	2025–26	24	552	12,393,201	22,289	
11	Major League Soccer	U.S.A. / Canada	CONCACAF	2025	30	510	11,213,880	21,988	
12	Liga MX	Mexico	CONCACAF	2025–26	18	306	6,611,808	21,607	
13	J1 League	Japan	AFC	2025	20	380	8,073,557	21,246	
14	Eredivisie	Netherlands	UEFA	2025–26	18	306	5,990,868 (Note: Total attendance for the Eredivisie is an approximate figure obtained by multiplying the number of matches by the reported average attendance.)	19,578	
15	Premiership	Scotland	UEFA	2025–26	12	228	4,010,722	17,746	

== Historic average attendances ==
=== 1996–2014 ===
Team
1996
1997
1998
1999
2000
2001
2002
2003
2004
2005
2006
2007
2008
2009
2010
2011
2012
2013
2014
COL
10213
11835
14812
14029
12580
16481
20690
16772
14195
13638
12056
14749
13659
13018
14329
14838
15175
15440
15082
CLB
18950
15043
12274
17696
15451
17511
17429
16250
16872
12916
13294
15230
14662
14175
14642
12185
14397
16080
16881
DCU
15262
16698
16008
17419
18580
21518
16519
15565
17232
16664
18215
20967
19835
15585
14532
15181
13846
13646
17030
DAL
16011
9678
10948
12211
13102
12574
13122
7906
9088
11189
14982
15154
13024
12440
10815
12861
14199
15373
16816
LAG
28916
20626
21784
17632
20400
17387
19047
21983
23809
24204
20814
24252
26009
20827
21437
23335
23136
22152
21258
NE
19025
21423
19188
16735
15463
15654
16927
14641
12226
12525
11786
16787
17580
12427
12987
13222
14001
14844
16681
NYRB
23898
16899
16520
14706
17621
20806
18155
15822
17195
15077
14570
16530
15928
12744
18441
19691
18281
19461
19421
SJ
17232
13597
13653
14959
12460
9635
11150
10466
13001
13037
-
-
13856
10329
9659
11858
13293
12765
14947
SKC
12878
9058
8073
8183
9112
10954
12255
15573
14816
9691
11083
11586
10686
10053
10287
17810
19404
19708
20003
TB
11679
11333
10312
13106
9452
10479
-
-
-
-
-
-
-
-
-
-
-
-
-

CHI
17887
16016
13387
16388
12922
14005
17153
17238
14111
16490
17034
15487
15814
14274
16409
15228
16076
MIA
10284
8689
7460
11177
-
-
-
-
-
-
-
-
-
-
-
-
-

CHV
17080
19840
14305
15114
15725
14576
14830
13056
8366
7064

Key
12345	Lowest season average		
54321	Highest season average		
	Highest season average in club history		
TB	MIA	CHV	Defunct teams
2020	2021	Affected by the COVID-19 pandemic	

RSL
18037
16366
15960
16179
17831
17095
17594
19087
19218
20351

HOU
18935
15883
16939
17624
17310
17694
21015
19923
20117

TOR
20130
20120
20344
20453
20267
18155
18131
22086

SEA
31203
36173
38496
43144
44038
43734

PHI
19254
18259
18053
17867
17631

POR
18827
20438
20674
20806
VAN
20412
19475
20038
20408

MTL
22772
20602
17421

=== 2015–present ===
Team	2015	2016	2017	2018	2019	2020	2021	2022	2023	2024	2025	2026
COL	15657	16278	15322	15333	14284	1866	8481	14473	15409	15686	15890	-
CLB	16985	17125	15439	12447	14856	1588	16583	19237	20314	20646	22795	-
DCU	16244	17081	17904	17635	17744	2843	12791	16256	17540	18137	16389	-
DAL	16015	14094	15122	15512	14842	2674	13418	16469	18220	19096	11013	-
LAG	23392	25138	22246	24444	23205	2199	15252	22841	24106	26136	20067	-
NE	19627	20185	19367	18347	16737	1529	12204	20319	23940	29262	24477	-
NYRB	19657	20620	21175	18644	17281	1570	9325	17002	17786	19479	19710	-
SJ	20979	19930	19875	19032	18781	2748	9132	15260	18412	17501	19614	-
SKC	19687	19597	19537	19950	18601	1926	15442	18365	18616	21193	16604	-
CHI	16003	15602	17383	14806	12324	0	10226	15848	18170	21328	23450	-
RSL	20160	19759	18781	18605	18121	1392	14532	20470	19429	20295	19776	-
HOU	20658	19021	17500	16909	15674	2204	12220	16426	15029	17038	17693	-
TOR	23451	26538	27647	26628	25048	2181	4769	25423	25310	25681	21353	-
SEA	44247	42636	43666	40641	40247	6101	25125	33607	32161	30754	30993	-
PHI	17451	17519	16812	16518	17111	0	11385	18126	18907	18845	18331	-
POR	21144	21144	21144	21144	25218	4228	13771	23841	23103	22485	22405	-
VAN	20507	22330	21416	21946	19514	2011	3395	16399	16745	26121	21806	-
MTL	17750	20669	20046	18569	16171	1616	647	15905	17552	19619	16162	-
NYC	29016	27196	22177	23211	21107	0	2775	17180	19816	21765	21971	-
ORL	32847	31324	25028	23866	22761	2127	14723	17261	20590	22805	20573	-
		ATL	48200	53002	52510	5331	43964	41116	47526	46831	43992	-
		MIN	20538	23902	19723	0	11439	19555	19568	19597	19247	-
			LAFC	22042	22251	3160	17439	22090	22155	22122	21931	-
				CIN	27336	0	19872	22487	25367	25237	24668	-
					MIA	0	11281	12637	17698	20979	20410	-
Key See the previous table					NSH	5370	18200	27554	28257	28599	26433	-
Key See the previous table						ATX	20738	20738	20738	20738	20738	-
Key See the previous table							CLT	35260	36337	33383	30664	-
Key See the previous table								STL	22423	22423	22423	-
Key See the previous table										SD	28064	-

== Individual game highest attendance ==
=== Regular season ===
	Home team	Score	Away team	Attendance	Stadium	Date	Ref.
1	LA Galaxy	2–1	Los Angeles FC	82,110	Rose Bowl	Jul 4, 2023	
2	Colorado Rapids	2–3	Inter Miami CF	75,824	Empower Field at Mile High	Apr 18, 2026	
3	Los Angeles FC	3–0	Inter Miami CF	75,673	Los Angeles Memorial Coliseum	Feb 21, 2026	
4	Charlotte FC	0–1	LA Galaxy	74,479	Bank of America Stadium	Mar 5, 2022	
5	Sporting Kansas City	2–3	Inter Miami CF	72,610	Arrowhead Stadium	Apr 13, 2024	
6	Atlanta United FC	3–0	LA Galaxy	72,548	Mercedes-Benz Stadium	Aug 3, 2019	
7	Atlanta United FC	1–1	Seattle Sounders FC	72,243	Mercedes-Benz Stadium	Jul 15, 2018	
8	Atlanta United FC	3–1	D.C. United	72,035	Mercedes-Benz Stadium	Mar 11, 2018	
9	D.C. United	1–2	Inter Miami CF	72,026	M&T Bank Stadium	Mar 7, 2026	
10	Atlanta United FC	2–0	Real Salt Lake	72,017	Mercedes-Benz Stadium	Sep 22, 2018	

=== MLS Cup playoffs ===
	Home team	Score	Away team	Attendance	Stadium	Date	Ref.
1	Atlanta United FC	2–0	Portland Timbers	73,019	Mercedes-Benz Stadium	Dec 8, 2018	
2	Atlanta United FC	3–1	New York City FC	70,526	Mercedes-Benz Stadium	Nov 11, 2018	
3	Atlanta United FC	3–0	New York Red Bulls	70,016	Mercedes-Benz Stadium	Nov 25, 2018	
4	Seattle Sounders FC	3–1	Toronto FC	69,274	CenturyLink Field	Nov 10, 2019	
5	Atlanta United FC	2–1	Inter Miami CF	68,455	Mercedes-Benz Stadium	Nov 2, 2024	
6	Atlanta United FC	0–0 (1–3 p)	Columbus Crew	67,221	Mercedes-Benz Stadium	Oct 26, 2017	
7	Atlanta United FC	1–0	New England Revolution	66,114	Mercedes-Benz Stadium	Oct 19, 2019	
8	New England Revolution	0–1	LA Galaxy	61,316	Gillette Stadium	Oct 20, 2002	
9	Montreal Impact	3–2	Toronto FC	61,004	Olympic Stadium	Nov 23, 2016	
10	D.C. United	2–1	Colorado Rapids	57,431	RFK Memorial Stadium	Oct 26, 1997	
11	Vancouver Whitecaps FC	2–2 (4–3 p)	Los Angeles FC	53,957	BC Place	Nov 22, 2025	
12	Chicago Fire FC	2–0	D.C. United	51,350	Rose Bowl	Oct 25, 1998	

Key
MLS Cup
Conference Final
Conference Semifinal
Otherwise, it is a previous knockout round

=== By team ===
The table below lists the highest attendances in individual games for current MLS teams that have recorded individual records. Teams that have repeated their highest attendance several times are excluded.

	Home team	Score	Away team	Attendance	Stadium	Date	Ref.
1	LA Galaxy	2–1 (Note: Local derby on Fourth of July.)	Los Angeles FC	82,110	Rose Bowl	Jul 4, 2023	
2	Colorado Rapids	2–3	Inter Miami CF	75,824	Empower Field at Mile High	Apr 18, 2026	
3	Los Angeles FC	3–0	Inter Miami CF	75,673	Los Angeles Memorial Coliseum	Feb 21, 2026	
4	Charlotte FC	0–1	LA Galaxy	74,479	Bank of America Stadium	Mar 5, 2022	
5	Atlanta United FC	2–0	Portland Timbers	73,019	Mercedes-Benz Stadium	Dec 8, 2018	
6	Sporting Kansas City	2–3	Inter Miami CF	72,610	Arrowhead Stadium	Apr 13, 2024	
7	D.C. United	1–2	Inter Miami CF	72,026	M&T Bank Stadium	Mar 7, 2026	
8	Seattle Sounders FC	3–1	Toronto FC	69,274	CenturyLink Field	Nov 10, 2019	
9	New York Red Bulls	5–4 (Note: David Beckham's first MLS start.)	LA Galaxy	66,237	Giants Stadium	Aug 18, 2007	
10	New England Revolution	1–4	Inter Miami CF	65,612	Gillette Stadium	Apr 27, 2024	
11	Chicago Fire FC	1–1	Inter Miami CF	63,094	Soldier Field	Sep 9, 2026	
12	Orlando City SC	1–1	New York City FC	62,510	Citrus Bowl	Mar 8, 2015	
13	Montreal Impact	3–2	Toronto FC	61,004	Olympic Stadium	Nov 23, 2016	
14	Columbus Crew	0–1	Inter Miami CF	60,614	Huntington Bank Field	Apr 19, 2025	
15	Nashville SC	1–2	Atlanta United FC	59,069	Nissan Stadium	Feb 29, 2020	
16	Vancouver Whitecaps FC	2–2 (4–3 p)	Los Angeles FC	53,957	BC Place	Nov 22, 2025	
17	Minnesota United FC	1–3 (Note: Last home game of the 2018 season and also last game at TCF Bank Stadium before moving to Allianz Field.)	LA Galaxy	52,242	TCF Bank Stadium	Oct 21, 2018	
18	San Jose Earthquakes	2–4	Los Angeles FC	50,978	Levi's Stadium	Sep 13, 2025	
19	New York City FC	1–3	New York Red Bulls	48,047	Yankee Stadium	Jun 28, 2015	
20	Toronto FC	2–4	Inter Miami CF	44,828	BMO Field	May 9, 2026	
21	Dallas Burn	1–0 (3–1 p)	Columbus Crew	35,250	Cotton Bowl	May 5, 1996	
22	Philadelphia Union	3–2	D.C. United	34,870	Lincoln Financial Field	Apr 10, 2010	
23	San Diego FC	0–0	St. Louis City SC	34,506	Snapdragon Stadium	Mar 1, 2025	
24	FC Cincinnati	3–1	Portland Timbers	32,250	Nippert Stadium	Mar 17, 2019	
24	FC Cincinnati	0–2	LA Galaxy	32,250	Nippert Stadium	Jun 22, 2019	
25	Houston Dynamo FC	2–0	Kansas City Wizards	30,972	Robertson Stadium	Nov 10, 2007	
26	Real Salt Lake	0–1 (Note: Last home game at Rice–Eccles Stadium before moving to the new soccer specific Rio Tinto Stadium.)	Chivas USA	26,391	Rice–Eccles Stadium	Sep 20, 2008	

Key
MLS Cup	Inaugural home game of the new club
Conference Final	Game against Inter Miami during the Lionel Messi era
Conference Semifinal	Local derby
Otherwise, it is a regular season game

== Doubleheader games highest attendance ==
	Home team	Score	Away team	Attendance	Doubleheader with	Stadium	Date	Ref.
1	Chivas USA	1–1	New England Revolution	92,516	Barcelona vs. Guadalajara	Los Angeles Memorial Coliseum	Aug 6, 2006	
2	Los Angeles Galaxy	2–2	Tampa Bay Mutiny	92,216	USA vs. Mexico	Rose Bowl	Jun 16, 1996	
3	Chivas USA	0–1	Los Angeles Galaxy	88,816	Guadalajara vs. América	Los Angeles Memorial Coliseum	Aug 10, 2005	
4	San Jose Clash	1–1	D.C. United	73,123	USA women vs. Brazil women (1999 FIFA Women's World Cup)	Stanford Stadium	Jul 4, 1999	
5	Houston Dynamo	0–1	Los Angeles Galaxy	70,550	Barcelona vs. América	Reliant Stadium	Aug 9, 2006	
6	San Jose Earthquakes	0–3	Columbus Crew	61,572	Barcelona vs. Guadalajara	Candlestick Park	Aug 8, 2009	
7	New England Revolution	2–1	Tampa Bay Mutiny	57,407	USA vs. Mexico	Foxboro Stadium	Apr 20, 1997	

== MLS ranking among pro sports leagues by metro area ==
The table below is sorted by MLS average attendance rank, and then by MLS average attendance. It only includes regular season numbers and only professional sports leagues in North America that have season averages of at least 10,000 spectators. Those leagues are NFL, MLB, MLS, CFL, NBA, NHL, UFL and NWSL.

In 2023, 2024 and 2025, NWSL surpassed the season average of 10,000 spectators. Six of its fourteen teams, which themselves drew more than 10,000 fans per game, have been included in this table.

UFL also produced an average higher than 10,000 spectators for its 2026 season. Two of its teams, which season averages of more than 10,000, have been added as well.

College football teams, some of which outdraw several major professional teams, are not listed below.

NFL, MLB, CFL, MLS and NWSL attendances are for their 2025 seasons. NBA and NHL attendances are for their 2025–26 regular seasons. Finally, UFL attendances are for its 2026 regular season.

Metro area	MLS Attend Rank	Higher average	MLS 2025 season		Lower average
Metro area	MLS Attend Rank	Higher average	Average	Team	Lower average
Columbus, OH	1st	—	22,795	Columbus Crew	16,878 Blue Jackets (NHL); 10,362 Aviators (UFL)
Portland, OR	1st	—	22,405	Portland; Timbers	18,173 Thorns (NWSL); 17,533 Trail Blazers (NBA)
Austin, TX	1st	—	20,738	Austin FC	—
Orlando, FL	1st	—	20,573	Orlando City SC	18,462 Magic (NBA)
Salt Lake City, UT	1st	—	19,776	Real Salt Lake	18,186 Jazz (NBA); 12,478 Mammoth (NHL)
Atlanta, GA	2nd	70,600 Falcons (NFL)	43,992	Atlanta; United FC	35,842 Braves (MLB); 16,356 Hawks (NBA)
Charlotte, NC	2nd	72,417 Panthers (NFL)	30,664	Charlotte FC	18,715 Hornets (NBA)
San Diego, CA	2nd	42,435 Padres (MLB)	28,064	San Diego FC	13,427 Wave (NWSL)
Nashville, TN	2nd	58,893 Titans (NFL)	26,433	Nashville SC	17,235 Predators (NHL)
Vancouver, BC	2nd	27,028 BC Lions (CFL)	21,806	Vancouver; Whitecaps FC	18,662 Canucks (NHL)
Toronto, ON	2nd	35,184 Blue Jays (MLB)	21,353	Toronto FC	18,833 Raptors (NBA); 18,667 Maple Leafs (NHL); 15,109 Argonauts (CFL)
Miami, FL	2nd	65,700 Dolphins (NFL)	20,410	Inter; Miami CF	19,709 Heat (NBA); 19,414 Panthers (NHL); 14,282 Marlins (MLB)
Seattle, WA	3rd	68,740 Seahawks (NFL); 31,334 Mariners (MLB)	30,993	Seattle; Sounders FC	17,151 Kraken (NHL)
Cincinnati, OH	3rd	64,949 Bengals (NFL) ) 26,802 Reds (MLB)	24,668	FC Cincinnati	—
Boston, MA	3rd	64,628 Patriots (NFL); 34,278 Red Sox (MLB)	24,477	New England; Revolution	19,156 Celtics (NBA); 17,850 Bruins (NHL)
Chicago, IL	3rd	58,127 Bears (NFL); 37,259 Cubs (MLB)	23,450	Chicago; Fire FC	20,244 Bulls (NBA); 18,949 Blackhawks (NHL); 17,849 White Sox (MLB)
St. Louis, MO	3rd	27,778 Cardinals (MLB); 23,239 Battlehawks (UFL)	22,423	St. Louis; City SC	17,847 Blues (NHL)
San Francisco; Bay Area, CA	3rd	71,177 49ers (NFL); 36,121 Giants (MLB)	19,614	San Jose; Earthquakes	18,064 Warriors (NBA); 16,173 Sharks (NHL); 14,823 Bay FC (NWSL)
Minneapolis - St. Paul, MN	3rd	66,842 Vikings (NFL); 21,836 Twins (MLB)	19,247	Minnesota; United FC	18,023 Wild (NHL); 17,865 Timberwolves (NBA)
Kansas City, MO/KS	3rd	73,460 Chiefs (NFL); 21,590 Royals (MLB)	16,604	Sporting; Kansas City	11,500 Current (NWSL)
Montreal, QC	3rd	21,132 Alouettes (CFL); 20,962 Canadiens (NHL)	16,162	CF Montreal	—
Houston, TX	4th	70,821 Texans (NFL); 33,677 Astros (MLB); 18,058 Rockets (NBA)	17,693	Houston; Dynamo FC	—
Washington, DC	4th	64,295 Commanders (NFL); 23,664 Nationals (MLB); 17,990 Capitals (NHL)	16,389	D.C. United	16,107 Wizards (NBA); 15,259 Spirit (NWSL)
New York, NY (NY City FC)	5th	79,787 Giants (NFL); 74,886 Jets (NFL); 41,885 Yankees (MLB); 39,316 Mets (MLB)	21,971	New York; City FC	19,812 Knicks (NBA); 19,710 Red Bulls (MLS); 17,576 Rangers (NHL); 17,412 Nets (NBA); 16,439 Islanders (NHL); 16,145 Devils (NHL)
Los Angeles, CA (LAFC)	5th	73,235 Rams (NFL); 71,560 Chargers (NFL); 49,537 Dodgers (MLB); 32,290 Angels (MLB)	21,931	Los Angeles; FC	20,067 Galaxy (MLS); 18,855 Lakers (NBA); 17,622 Clippers (NBA); 17,435 Kings (NHL); 16,257 Angel City (NWSL); 15,670 Ducks (NHL)
Philadelphia, PA	5th	69,879 Eagles (NFL); 41,672 Phillies (MLB); 18,997 76ers (NBA); 18,485 Flyers (NHL)	18,331	Philadelphia; Union	—
Denver, CO	5th	76,585 Broncos (NFL); 29,687 Rockies (MLB); 19,826 Nuggets (NBA); 18,120 Avalanche (NHL)	15,890	Colorado; Rapids	—
Dallas, TX	5th	92,991 Cowboys (NFL); 29,593 Rangers (MLB); 19,288 Mavericks (NBA) ) 18,532 Stars (NHL)	11,013	FC Dallas	—
Los Angeles, CA (LA Galaxy)	6th	73,235 Rams (NFL); 71,560 Chargers (NFL); 49,537 Dodgers (MLB); 32,290 Angels (MLB); 21,931 LAFC (MLS)	20,067	LA Galaxy	18,855 Lakers (NBA); 17,622 Clippers (NBA); 17,435 Kings (NHL); 16,257 Angel City (NWSL); 15,670 Ducks (NHL)
New York, NY (NY Red Bulls)	7th	79,787 Giants (NFL); 74,886 Jets (NFL); 41,885 Yankees (MLB); 39,316 Mets (MLB); 21,971 NYCFC (MLS); 19,812 Knicks (NBA)	19,710	New York; Red Bulls	17,576 Rangers (NHL); 17,412 Nets (NBA); 16,439 Islanders (NHL); 16,145 Devils (NHL)

== See also ==
- Record attendances in United States club soccer
- List of Major League Soccer stadiums
- National Women's Soccer League attendance
