= Jim Lawson (sports executive) =

- Born: August 10, 1958 (age 68) Hamilton, Ontario, Canada
- Height: 6 ft 0 in (183 cm)
- Weight: 190 lb (86 kg; 13 st 8 lb)
- Position: Centre
- Shot: Left
- Played for: Nova Scotia Voyageurs; Flint Generals
- NHL draft: 120th overall, 1978; Montreal Canadiens
- Playing career: 1980–1987

James J. Lawson is Chief Executive Officer of Woodbine Entertainment Group, a businessman and lawyer. Lawson was appointed CEO of Woodbine Entertainment in 2015.

Lawson was formerly the Chair of the Board of Governors for the Canadian Football League Lawson has served twice as interim Commissioner of the Canadian Football League. Lawson stepped down as Chair after the 2019 CFL season.

He has been a partner at Torys LLP and Davies Ward Phillips & Vineberg LLP and has served as a director of Algoma Steel, Zargon Energy Trust, Countryside Power Income Fund and Sleep Country Canada.

== Education ==
Lawson attended Aldershot High School in Burlington, Ontario. From 1975 to 1976, while in high school, Lawson played hockey for the junior A-team Burlington Mohawks, now called the Burlington Cougars. For the next four years, attending Brown University on a hockey scholarship, he played for Brown's Brown Bears while earning his degree in economics. He went on to receive a law degree from the University of Western Ontario.

== Hockey career ==
In 1978, Lawson, while playing for Brown University, was drafted into the National Hockey League by the Montreal Canadiens in the NHL Amateur Draft. From 1979 to 1982, he played three professional seasons for the Nova Scotia Voyageurs, the Canadiens' affiliate in the American Hockey League. During this time, he also played with the International Hockey League's Flint Generals. He then spent two seasons with Flamborough of Ontario's Senior A League.

== Canadian Football League ==
In September 2013, Lawson was appointed chair of the Canadian Football League's Board of Governors. Following CFL Commissioner Mark Cohon's departure in January 2015, Lawson was appointed as the League's interim Commissioner, remaining until the appointment of Jeffrey Orridge in April 2015. After Orridge left in June 2017, he was again appointed interim Commissioner until the Board selected current Commissioner Randy Ambrosie.

In November 2019, Lawson stepped down as Chair in order to focus full-time on his increasingly time-consuming role as CEO of Woodbine Entertainment Group, which by then included not only racetracks and a casino but real estate development near Toronto Airport.

Ambrosie presented Lawson with the CFL's Commissioner Award during the league's annual awards banquet. In October 2021, Lawson was inducted into the Burlington Sports Hall of Fame. Also in October 2021, Lawson joined the executive committee of the Hamilton Sports Group, which owns the Hamilton Tiger-Cats, alongside Bob Young and CEO Scott Mitchell, becoming a minority stakeholder in March 2022.

== Westerkirk Capital ==
He was fired from Westerkirk Capital amid allegations including self-dealing, forgery and misusing his office equipment to view pornography. Lawson commenced legal action for unfair dismissal against Westerkirk and its owner, Sherry Brydson. All legal proceedings were discontinued in September 2017, and Lawson "apologized unreservedly to Ms. Brydson for the circumstances that led to his departure from Westerkirk" as well as withdrawing all allegations he had made involving Ms. Brydson, her family, employees and advisors.

== Woodbine Entertainment Group ==
In 2015, while still Chair of the Canadian Football League's Board of Governors, Lawson became the CEO of Woodbine Entertainment Group, Canada's largest racetrack operator, for which he had previously served as Chair. During his tenure, Lawson led the development of the lands around the Woodbine Racetrack in the Etobicoke neighborhood of Toronto. During the COVID-19 pandemic, Lawson sent letters to Ontario lawmakers seeking allowances similar to those allowed the NHL and AHL to help racetrack workers to keep their jobs.

Prior to the 2010 Queen's Plate, which is held yearly at the Woodbine Racetrack, Queen Elizabeth II, who was in attendance, approached Lawson, whose family was running a horse Ghost Fleet in the race, to discuss horse breeding and his family's history in racing. The Queen was intrigued by Ghost Fleet's lineage to Northern Dancer, the first Canadian-bred horse to win the Kentucky Derby and a prolific sire.
