= Stewart Johnston =

15th Commissioner of the Canadian Football League

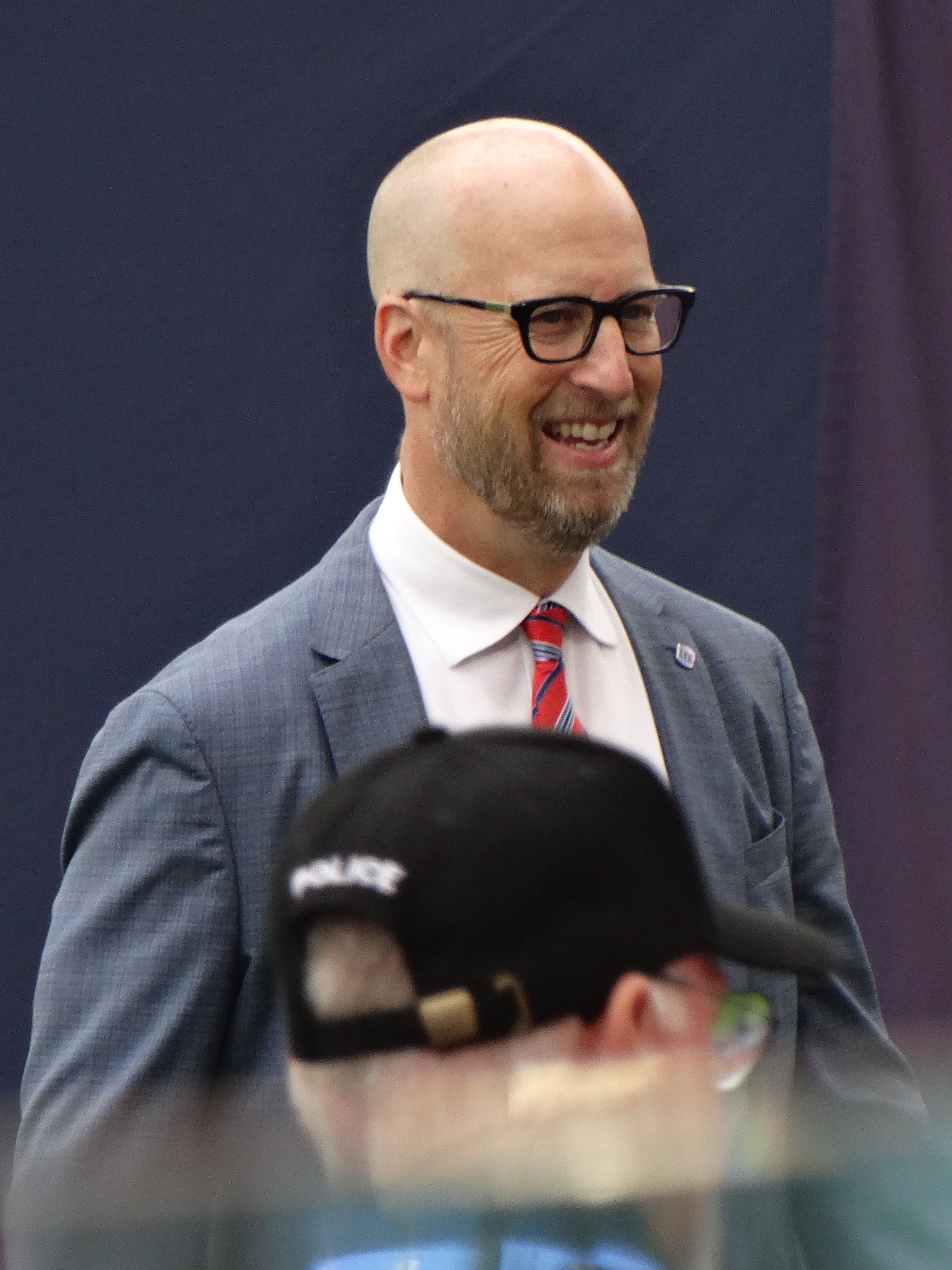
- Johnston in 2025

15th Commissioner of the CFL
- Incumbent
- Assumed office April 24, 2025
- Preceded by: Randy Ambrosie

Personal details
- Born: Stewart Christopher Johnston; February 26, 1971 (age 55) Toronto, Ontario, Canada
- Education: Queen's University (BCom)

Stewart Christopher Johnston (born February 26, 1971) is a Canadian businessman, who is the 15th and current commissioner of the Canadian Football League (CFL) and former president of The Sports Network and Senior Vice President of Bell Media, Content and Sales.

== Early life ==
Johnston was born in Toronto, Ontario, on February 26, 1971, to Charles Christopher (Chris) Johnston, a lawyer, and Vivian Audrey (née Ash). The third of five children, Johnston's family moved to Ottawa in 1972 when he was one year old. While growing up in Ottawa, he was neighbours with legendary kicker of the Ottawa Rough Riders, Gerry Organ.

Johnston attended Ashbury College in Ottawa for his high school years, where he played both quarterback and kicker for both the junior varsity and varsity football teams in addition to hockey. He described himself as a 'sports junkie' when he was young. Johnston attended Queen's University in Kingston, Ontario and received a letter of permission to study at the University of British Columbia for his final year. He graduated from Queen's with an Honours Business Degree.

== Career ==
Between his third and fourth years of university, Johnston took a 16-month co-op position with Gatorade in Peterborough, Ontario, in the sports marketing department. This position led him to working at the 82nd Grey Cup, where he mixed drinks behind the bench for the Baltimore Stallions.

Johnston started working as an intern at TSN in 1997. He worked his way up the ranks and was promoted to Vice President of Programming in 2006. In 2010, he was made President. In 2014, Johnston added TSN3, TSN4, and TSN5 to TSN's list of networks. He described it as an "important evolution" for the network, as it would allow TSN to make more efficient use of its portfolio of sports properties, by showing more sports games on at the same time to satisfy the people and the company. When he departed Bell Media for the Canadian Football League in 2025, he held the position of Senior Vice President, Content and Sales.

In 2019, Johnston was ranked #48 in The Hockey News "Top 100 People of Power and Influence". In November, he was appointed Vice-Chairman of the Hockey Hall of Fame.

On April 1, 2025, Johnston was named by Dan Ralph of The Canadian Press as the top candidate to replace the retiring Randy Ambrosie as commissioner of the Canadian Football League. The next day on April 2, 2025, Johnston was announced as Ambrosie's successor, officially assuming the role on April 24, 2025.
