= Canadian Football League attendance =

Canadian Football League attendance has averaged over 20,000 spectators per game in every season since 1963. The CFL consistently draws, on average, the third largest crowds to its games of any professional sports league in North America, ranking behind the National Football League and Major League Baseball, and ahead of the National Hockey League, National Basketball Association, Major League Soccer, and National Lacrosse League.

To date, a CFL game has drawn in excess of 50,000 spectators 111 times. It happened for the first six times in 1976, when Toronto's Exhibition Stadium was renovated to accommodate the Toronto Blue Jays, and its capacity was enlarged to become the first CFL stadium capable of holding such a large crowd. Later that same season, the Montreal Alouettes moved into Olympic Stadium, following the 1976 Summer Olympics. Large stadiums were constructed soon afterward for the Edmonton Eskimos and BC Lions. During the late 1970s and early 1980s, CFL attendance peaked at about 30,000 fans per game.

During the 1980s and 1990s, CFL attendance declined sharply, reaching its nadir by the mid-1990s due in large part to the league's unsuccessful attempt to expand to the United States. Since start of the 21st century, CFL attendance has stabilized. During the current decade, new stadiums have been constructed for the Hamilton Tiger-Cats, Ottawa Redblacks, and Winnipeg Blue Bombers, all with modern amenities and capacities of between one quarter and one half the capacity of an average NFL stadium. Mosaic Stadium was constructed to house the Saskatchewan Roughriders while BMO Field in Toronto, originally built for Toronto FC of Major League Soccer, was renovated to accommodate the Toronto Argonauts. Existing stadiums, most notably Commonwealth Stadium in Edmonton and BC Place in Vancouver, have undergone major upgrades.

During the 2010s, CFL attendance has consistently exceeded 25,000 fans per game. An average of 25,286 fans watched CFL games in 2014. CFL attendance has been depressed during the middle of the 2010s by short-term issues, most notably the lack of stadium availability in Toronto and Hamilton. By 2018, attendances in Toronto, Montreal, and Vancouver were consistently below 20,000 fans, prompting long-term concerns in those markets.

== Top single-game attendance marks ==
Below is a list of all Canadian Football League games reported to have been attended by 60,000 or more spectators.

Rank	Date	Result	City	Stadium	Attendance	Note
1.	Tue 09/06/77	Toronto 20 @ Montreal 14	Montreal	Olympic Stadium	69,093	
2.	Sun 09/26/76	Ottawa 2 @ Montreal 23	Montreal	Olympic Stadium	68,505	
3.	Sun 11/27/77	Montreal 41 vs. Edmonton 6	Montreal	Olympic Stadium	68,318	Grey Cup
4.	Tue 08/23/77	Ottawa 20 @ Montreal 27	Montreal	Olympic Stadium	66,544	
5.	Sun 11/23/08	Calgary 22 vs. Montreal 14	Montreal	Olympic Stadium	66,308	Grey Cup
6.	Sun 11/25/01	Calgary 27 vs. Winnipeg 19	Montreal	Olympic Stadium	65,255	Grey Cup
7.	Tue 08/22/78	B.C. 26 @ Montreal 30	Montreal	Olympic Stadium	65,132	
8.	Sun 11/25/79	Edmonton 17 vs. Montreal 9	Montreal	Olympic Stadium	65,113	Grey Cup
9.	Thu 08/11/77	Winnipeg 10 @ Montreal 27	Montreal	Olympic Stadium	63,330	
10.	Sun 11/28/10	Montreal 21 vs. Saskatchewan 18	Edmonton	Commonwealth Stadium	63,317	Grey Cup
11.	Sun 10/02/77	Toronto 18 @ Montreal 6	Montreal	Olympic Stadium	62,832	
12.	Sun 11/24/02	Montreal 25 vs. Edmonton 16	Edmonton	Commonwealth Stadium	62,531	Grey Cup
13.	Sat 09/26/09	Saskatchewan 23 @ Edmonton 20	Edmonton	Commonwealth Stadium	62,517	
14.	Fri 09/05/03	Calgary 0 @ Edmonton 38	Edmonton	Commonwealth Stadium	62,444	
15.	Tue 09/05/78	Ottawa 23 @ Montreal 18	Montreal	Olympic Stadium	62,197	
16.	Sat 10/22/77	Ottawa 16 @ Montreal 28	Montreal	Olympic Stadium	62,157	
17.	Sat 11/06/76	Ottawa 17 @ Montreal 26	Montreal	Olympic Stadium	61,950	
18.	Fri 09/06/02	Calgary 11 @ Edmonton 45	Edmonton	Commonwealth Stadium	61,481	
19.	Sun 11/16/97	Toronto 47 vs. Saskatchewan 23	Edmonton	Commonwealth Stadium	60,431	Grey Cup
20.	Sun 11/18/84	Winnipeg 47 vs. Hamilton 17	Edmonton	Commonwealth Stadium	60,081	Grey Cup
21.	Sun 11/09/03	Toronto 26 @ Montreal 30	Montreal	Olympic Stadium	60,007	Eastern Final

== League records ==
=== Single game records ===
Type of game	Attendance	Date	City	Stadium	Result
Pre-season	53,472	Thu 06/23/83	Vancouver	B.C. Place	Calgary 19 @ B.C. 41
Regular season	69,093	Tue 09/06/77	Montreal	Olympic Stadium	Toronto 20 @ Montreal 14
Eastern Semi-Final	37,835	Fri 11/05/04	Toronto	SkyDome	Hamilton 6 @ Toronto 24
Western Semi-Final	40,381	Sat 11/15/86	Vancouver	B.C. Place	Winnipeg 14 @ B.C 21
Eastern Final	60,007	Sun 11/09/03	Montreal	Olympic Stadium	Toronto 26 @ Montreal 30
Western Final	59,478	Sun 11/17/85	Vancouver	B.C. Place	Winnipeg 22 @ B.C. 42
Grey Cup	68,318	Sun 11/27/77	Montreal	Olympic Stadium	Montreal 41 vs. Edmonton 6

=== Season records ===
Team attendance records
Type of record	Attendance	Team	Year	Stadium	Games
Total—Regular season	476,201	Montreal Alouettes	1977	Olympic Stadium	8
Total—Regular season and playoffs	531,601	Montreal Alouettes	1977	Olympic Stadium	9
Average—Regular season	59,525	Montreal Alouettes	1977	Olympic Stadium	8
Average—Regular season and playoffs	59,067	Montreal Alouettes	1977	Olympic Stadium	9

League attendance records
Type of record	Attendance	Year	Games
Total—Regular season	2,303,365	2005	81
Total—Regular season and playoffs			
Average—Regular season	31,831	1978	72
Average—Regular season and playoffs			

== Team records ==
=== BC Lions ===
Type of record	Attendance	Date/Year	Stadium	Result/Games
Pre-season game	53,472*	Thu 06/23/83	B.C. Place	Calgary 19 @ B.C. 41
Regular season game	59,478	Fri 10/11/85; Fri 09/19/86	B.C. Place	Winnipeg 31 @ B.C. 10; Edmonton 32 @ B.C. 3
Playoff game	59,478	Sun 11/17/85	B.C. Place	Winnipeg 22 @ B.C. 42
Grey Cup game (host)	59,621	Sun 11/30/86	B.C. Place	Hamilton 39 vs. Edmonton 15
Total attendance-Regular season	418,738	1986	B.C. Place	9 games (46,526 avg.)
Total attendance-Regular season and playoffs	459,119	1986	B.C. Place	10 games (45,912 avg.)
Average attendance-Regular season	46,526	1986	B.C. Place	9 games (418,738 total)
Average attendance-Regular season and playoffs	47,089	1983	B.C. Place	9 games (423,801 total)

=== Calgary Stampeders ===
Type of record	Attendance	Date/Year	Stadium	Result/Games
Pre-season game	32,649	Tue 07/02/91	McMahon Stadium	Edmonton 21 @ Calgary 25
Regular season game	45,010	Sun 10/29/00	McMahon Stadium	Montreal 31 @ Calgary 32
Playoff game	35,650	Sun 11/05/06; Sat 11/15/08; Sun 11/21/10	McMahon Stadium	Saskatchewan 30 @ Calgary 21; B.C. 18 @ Calgary 22; Saskatchewan 20 @ Calgary 16
Grey Cup game (host)	50,035	Sun 11/28/93	McMahon Stadium	Edmonton 33 vs. Winnipeg 23
Total attendance-Regular season	328,516	2009	McMahon Stadium	9 games (36,502 avg.)
Total attendance-Regular season and playoffs	359,872	2009	McMahon Stadium	10 games (35,987 avg.)
Average attendance-Regular season	36,502	2009	McMahon Stadium	9 games (328,516 total)
Average attendance-Regular season and playoffs	35,987	2009	McMahon Stadium	10 games (359,872 total)

=== Edmonton Elks/ Edmonton Eskimos ===
Type of record	Attendance	Date/Year	Stadium	Result/Games
Pre-season game	49,723	Fri 06/25/82	Commonwealth Stadium	Calgary 23 @ Edmonton 18
Regular season game	62,517	Sat 09/26/09	Commonwealth Stadium	Saskatchewan 23 @ Edmonton 20
Playoff game	52,709	Sun 11/15/81	Commonwealth Stadium	B.C. 16 @ Edmonton 22
Grey Cup game (host)	63,317	Sun 11/28/10	Commonwealth Stadium	Montreal 21 vs. Saskatchewan 18
Total attendance-Regular season	463,188	1982	Commonwealth Stadium	8 games (57,899 avg.)
Total attendance-Regular season and playoffs	514,299	1982	Commonwealth Stadium	9 games (57,144 avg.)
Average attendance-Regular season	57,899	1982	Commonwealth Stadium	8 games (463,188 total)
Average attendance-Regular season and playoffs	57,144	1982	Commonwealth Stadium	9 games (514,299 total)

=== Hamilton Tiger-Cats ===
Type of record	Attendance	Date/Year	Stadium	Result/Games
Pre-season game	27,585	Wed 06/13/12	Ivor Wynne Stadium	Toronto 29 @ Hamilton 24
Regular season game	35,394	Sun 11/07/76	Ivor Wynne Stadium	Toronto 0 @ Hamilton 18
Playoff game	33,392	Sun 11/14/71	Ivor Wynne Stadium	Toronto 23 @ Hamilton 8
Grey Cup game (host)	38,595	Sun 11/24/96	Ivor Wynne Stadium	Toronto 43 vs. Edmonton 37
Total attendance-Regular season	252,018	2005	Ivor Wynne Stadium	9 games (28,002 avg.)
Total attendance-Regular season and playoffs	255,627	1972	Ivor Wynne Stadium	8 games (31,953 avg.)
Average attendance-Regular season	32,129	1972	Ivor Wynne Stadium	7 games (224,906 total)
Average attendance-Regular season and playoffs	31,953	1972	Ivor Wynne Stadium	8 games (255,627 total)

=== Ottawa Rough Riders / Renegades / Redblacks ===
Type of record	Attendance	Date/Year	Stadium	Result/Games
Pre-season game	23,252	Thu 06/08/17	TD Place Stadium	Hamilton 29 @ Ottawa 30
Regular season game	35,342	Tue 11/02/75	Lansdowne Park	Montreal 6 @ Ottawa 46
Playoff game	32,699	Sun 11/15/75	Lansdowne Park	Montreal 20 @ Ottawa 10
Grey Cup game (host)	51,242	Sun 11/21/04	Frank Clair Stadium	Toronto 27 vs. BC 19
Total attendance-Regular season	224,656	1975	Lansdowne Park	8 games (28,082 avg.)
Total attendance-Regular season and playoffs	257,355	1975	Lansdowne Park	9 games (28,595 avg.)
Average attendance-Regular season	28,082	1975	Lansdowne Park	8 games (224,656 total)
Average attendance-Regular season and playoffs	28,595	1975	Lansdowne Park	9 games (257,355 total)

=== Montreal Alouettes ===
Type of record	Attendance	Date/Year	Stadium	Result/Games
Pre-season game	34,191	Tue 07/04/78	Olympic Stadium	Toronto 24 @ Montreal 27
Regular season game	69,093*	Tue 09/06/77	Olympic Stadium	Toronto 20 @ Montreal 14
Playoff game	60,007	Sun 11/09/03	Olympic Stadium	Toronto 26 @ Montreal 30
Grey Cup game (host)	68,318	Sun 11/27/77	Olympic Stadium	Montreal 41 vs. Edmonton 6
Total attendance-Regular season	476,201	1977	Olympic Stadium	8 games (59,525 avg.)
Total attendance-Regular season and playoffs	531,601	1977	Olympic Stadium	9 games (59,067 avg.)
Average attendance-Regular season	59,525	1977	Olympic Stadium	8 games (476,201 total)
Average attendance-Regular season and playoffs	59,067	1977	Olympic Stadium	9 games (531,601 total)

=== Saskatchewan Roughriders ===
Type of record	Attendance	Date/Year	Stadium	Result/Games
Pre-season game	33,350	Sat 06/10/17	Mosaic Stadium	Winnipeg 25 @ Saskatchewan 25
Regular season game	55,438	Sat 10/14/95	Taylor Field	Calgary 20 @ Saskatchewan 25
Playoff game	33,350	Sat 11/08/25	Mosaic Stadium	BC 21 @ Saskatchewan 24
Grey Cup game (host)	52,564	Sun 11/19/95	Taylor Field	Baltimore 37 vs Calgary 20
Total attendance-Regular season	337,527	2013	Mosaic Stadium at Taylor Field	9 games (37,503 avg.)
Total attendance-Regular season and playoffs	368,469	2013	Mosaic Stadium at Taylor Field	10 games (36,847 avg.)
Average attendance-Regular season	37,503	2013	Mosaic Stadium at Taylor Field	9 games (337,527 total)
Average attendance-Regular season and playoffs	36,847	2013	Mosaic Stadium at Taylor Field	10 games (368,469 total)

=== Toronto Argonauts ===
Type of record	Attendance	Date/Year	Stadium	Result/Games
Pre-season game	39,804	Wed 07/07/77	Exhibition Stadium	Ottawa 6 @ Toronto 28
Regular season game	52,521	Fri 09/10/82	Exhibition Stadium	Hamilton 30 @ Toronto 25
Playoff game	54,530	Sun 11/20/83	Exhibition Stadium	Hamilton 36 @ Toronto 41
Grey Cup game (host)	54,741	Sun 11/28/82	Exhibition Stadium	Edmonton 32 vs. Toronto 16
Total attendance-Regular season	378,840	1976	Exhibition Stadium	8 games (47,355 avg.)
Total attendance-Regular season and playoffs	378,840	1976	Exhibition Stadium	8 games (47,355 avg.)
Average attendance-Regular season	47,355	1976	Exhibition Stadium	8 games (378,840 total)
Average attendance-Regular season and playoffs	47,355	1976	Exhibition Stadium	8 games (378,840 total)

=== Winnipeg Blue Bombers ===
Type of record	Attendance	Date/Year	Stadium	Result/Games
Pre-season game	33,421	Wed 07/03/91	Winnipeg Stadium	Ottawa 32 @ Winnipeg 45
Regular season game	35,959	Sun 09/12/93	Winnipeg Stadium	Saskatchewan 23 @ Winnipeg 41
Playoff game	32,946	Sun 11/22/87	Winnipeg Stadium	Toronto 19 @ Winnipeg 3
Grey Cup game (host)	51,985	Sun 11/24/91	Winnipeg Stadium	Toronto 36 vs. Calgary 21
Total attendance-Regular season	291,087	2025	Princess Auto Stadium	9 games (32,343 avg.)
Total attendance-Regular season and playoffs	313,110	2024	Princess Auto Stadium	10 games (31,311 avg.)
Average attendance-Regular season	32,343	2025	Princess Auto Stadium	9 games (291,087 total)
Average attendance-Regular season and playoffs	31,311	2024	Princess Auto Stadium	10 games (313,110 total)

== CFL attendance vs. other North American professional sports leagues ==
The following table compares the CFL regular season average attendance against the regular-season average attendance for the other professional sports leagues in North America with average attendance of at least 10,000 spectators per game.

League	Sport	# Teams	Season	Average attendance	Average vs. prior season	Total attendance	Ref
National Football League	American football	32	2019	66,648	−0.7	17,061,787	
Major League Baseball	Baseball	30	2019	28,339	−1.7	68,494,752	
Liga MX	Soccer	18	2018–19	22,896	−9.7	3,503,135	
Canadian Football League	Canadian football	9	2023	22,393	3.0	1,856,263	
Major League Soccer	Soccer	29	2023	22,112	5.0	10,870,325	
National Basketball Association	Basketball	30	2018–19	17,844	−0.7	21,964,447	
National Hockey League	Ice hockey	31	2018–19	17,377	−0.7	22,002,081	

== 2025 CFL attendance ==
Ranked from highest to lowest average home attendance. The average attendance was 22,949.

Regular season
No.	Team	Home games	Total attendance	Average attendance
1	Winnipeg Blue Bombers	9	291,087	32,343
2	Saskatchewan Roughriders	9	255,843	28,427
3	BC Lions	9	244,116	27,124
4	Hamilton Tiger-Cats	9	205,722	22,858
5	Calgary Stampeders	9	200,655	22,295
6	Montreal Alouettes	9	190,188	21,132
7	Edmonton Elks	9	171,450	19,050
8	Ottawa Redblacks	9	163,224	18,136
9	Toronto Argonauts	9	135,981	15,109
