= List of Canadian Football League mascots =

L The following is a list of the mascots of each Canadian Football League team.

== Current mascots ==
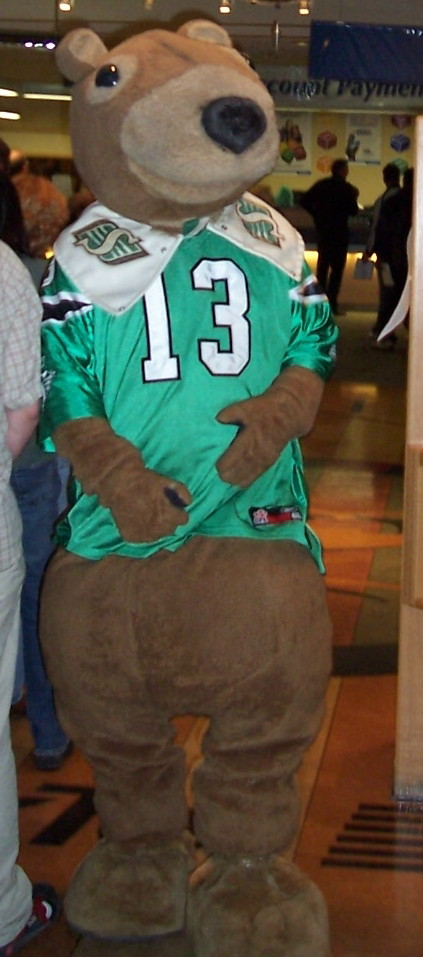
The Saskatchewan Roughriders mascot, Gainer the Gopher

West Division
Team	Mascot(s)	Introduced	Ref.
BC Lions	Leo and Roary	n/a	
Calgary Stampeders	Ralph The Dog and Quick Six	1975	
Edmonton Elks	Punter and Nanook	2004, 1997	
Saskatchewan Roughriders	Gainer the Gopher	1977	
Winnipeg Blue Bombers	Buzz and Boomer	1984	
East Division
Team	Mascot(s)	Introduced	Ref.
Hamilton Tiger-Cats	T.C. and Stripes	1984, 2004	
Montreal Alouettes	Touché	1996	
Ottawa Redblacks	Big Joe	2014	
Toronto Argonauts	Jason	2005	

== Other and former mascots ==
In 2003, the Calgary Stampeders introduced another mascot of sorts, "Quick Six," which is an actual horse. Quick Six continues a Stampeders tradition, which began in 1993, of having a horse charge down the east sidelines of a field, after Calgary scores a touchdown.

Out of the nine current CFL teams, only one has replaced their mascot, the Toronto Argonauts. Prior to Jason, the Argonauts had a mascot named "Scully," who was "traded" by the team, for Jason, in 2003. Jason was later, "promoted to starting mascot," in 2005. The now defunct franchise, the Ottawa Renegades' mascot was Ruffy the Beaver.

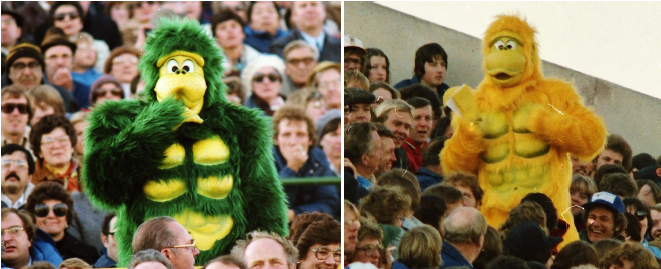

The Edmonton Eskimos first introduced costumed mascots in 1972 as part of the Eskimos CHQT "QT's" Cheerleader team. The original gorilla-like mascots were redesigned in 1976 as two cartoon-like gorillas, custom made in Salt Lake City. Green and gold, respectively, the two were called Eski and Mo. Nanook was the Edmonton Eskimos' only mascot from 1997 to 2003. Punter was introduced in 2004, as a secondary mascot. They were together from 2004 to 2020. When the Eskimos' name changed to the Elks, Nanook was retired in 2021. While Nanook was replaced by an elk named Spike, Punter remains the secondary mascot.

The Winnipeg Blue Bombers original mascot was Captain Blue, who was introduced in the early 1970s. Since 1984 with the introduction of Buzz and Boomer, Captain Blue was made the secondary mascot. Captain Blue is always seen driving his full scale Blue Bomber biplane, which is a life like cartoon replica of the WWI biplane flown under the British Royal Air Force. After every touchdown and field goal scored by the Blue Bombers, Captain Blue drifts his biplane around the end zones.

Before Ottawa's mascot Big Joe, the city had a very prominent history of mascots.

West Division
Team	Mascot(s)	Discontinued	Ref.
BC Lions	n/a	n/a	
Calgary Stampeders	n/a	n/a	
Edmonton Elks	Spike	2025	
Saskatchewan Roughriders	Leonard and Goof	n/a	
Winnipeg Blue Bombers	n/a	n/a	
East Division
Team	Mascot(s)	Discontinued	Ref.
Hamilton Tiger-Cats	n/a	n/a	
Montreal Alouettes	Blitz	2013	
Ottawa Redblacks	Scruffy the Beaver	2005	
Toronto Argonauts	Scully	2003	
