= Canadian Football League =

Professional Canadian football league

Canadian Football League; Ligue canadienne de football
- Most recent season or competition: 2026 CFL season
- Sport: Canadian football
- Founded: January 19, 1958 (68 years ago)
- First season: 1958
- Commissioner: Stewart Johnston
- No. of teams: 9
- Country: Canada
- Headquarters: 50 Wellington Street East, Toronto, Ontario
- Most recent champions: Edmonton Elks (12th title)
- Most titles: Edmonton Elks (12 titles)
- Broadcasters: Canada: Broadcast; TSN/CTV; RDS (French); Live Streaming; DAZN (beginning in 2027); United States: Live Streaming; YouTube (beginning in 2027); International: See list
- Website: cfl.ca

The Canadian Football League (CFL; French: Ligue canadienne de football [liɡ kanadjɛn də futbol], LCF) is a professional Canadian football league in Canada. It comprises nine teams divided into two divisions, with four teams in the East Division and five in the West Division. The CFL is the highest professional level of Canadian football and is headquartered in Toronto.

The CFL was officially established on January 19, 1958, with the merger of the Interprovincial Rugby Football Union or "Big Four" (founded in 1907) and the Western Interprovincial Football Union (WIFU) (started in March 1936). The Big Four was renamed the Eastern Football Conference in 1960, while the WIFU was renamed the Western Football Conference in 1961.

As of 2026, the league features a 21-week regular season in which each team plays 18 games with three bye weeks. The regular season traditionally runs from early-June to late October. After the regular season, six teams compete in the playoffs, which culminate in the Grey Cup championship game in late November. The Grey Cup is one of Canada's largest annual sports and television events.

== History ==
=== Early history ===
Rugby football began to be played in Canada in the 1860s. Many of the first Canadian football teams played under the auspices of the Canadian Rugby Football Union (CRFU), founded in June 1880, then reorganized in February 1884. The CRFU was reorganized as the Canadian Rugby Union (CRU) in 1891, and served as an umbrella organization for several provincial and regional unions. The Grey Cup was donated by Governor General the Earl Grey in 1909 to the team winning the "Senior Amateur Football Championship of Canada". By that time, the sport as played in Canada had diverged markedly from its rugby origins with the introduction of the Burnside rules, and started to become more similar to the American game.

For much of the early part of the 20th century, the game was contested by intraprovincial leagues, or unions. In 1907, several of the stronger senior clubs in Ontario and Quebec formed the Interprovincial Rugby Football Union (IRFU or more commonly known as the "Big Four"). It took almost 30 years for an elite interprovincial western union to emerge, when in 1936 the stronger senior clubs in Manitoba, Alberta and Saskatchewan formed the Western Interprovincial Football Union (WIFU). From the 1930s to the 1950s, the Big Four and WIFU gradually evolved from amateur to professional leagues, and amateur teams were no longer competitive for the Grey Cup. Apart from the World War II years, an amateur team last won the Grey Cup in 1936.

By the end of World War II, the WIFU's play was at the same level as that of the Big Four. Within a few years after the return of peace, both interprovincial unions had turned openly professional. However, while the Big Four champion got an automatic berth to the Grey Cup final, until 1954 the WIFU's champion had to play in a semi-final against the champion of the Ontario Rugby Football Union (ORFU)—by then, the only amateur union still competing for the Grey Cup. The ORFU withdrew from Grey Cup competition after the 1953 season, and the WIFU champion was given an automatic berth in the Grey Cup final. For this reason, 1954 is reckoned as the start of the modern era of Canadian football, in which the Grey Cup has been exclusively contested by professional teams. Since 1965, Canada's top university football teams, competing in what is now U Sports, have competed for the Vanier Cup.

=== Merger ===
In 1956, the Montreal Alouettes threatened to leave the Big Four and join the rival WIFU. As a result, the Big Four and WIFU formed a new umbrella organization, the Canadian Football Council (CFC) to modernize the operations and management of the professional game. In 1958, the CFC formally left the CRU and reorganized as the Canadian Football League (CFL). As part of an agreement between the CRU and CFL, the CFL took possession of the Grey Cup, and the amateurs were officially locked out of Grey Cup play, formalizing the championship structure that had been in place since 1954. The CRU remained the governing body for amateur play in Canada, eventually adopting the name Football Canada. Initially, the two unions remained autonomous, and there was no intersectional play between eastern (Big Four) and western (WIFU) teams except at the Grey Cup final. This situation was roughly analogous to how Major League Baseball operated for almost all of the 20th century.

The Big Four was renamed the Eastern Football Conference in 1960, while the WIFU was renamed the Western Football Conference in 1961. Also in 1961, limited intersectional play was introduced. Because the West played 16 games by this time while the East still only played 14, this arrangement oddly allowed both the four-team Eastern Conference and the five-team Western Conference to play three games per intraconference opponent and one game per interconference opponent. It was not until 1974 that the East expanded its schedule to 16 games, just like the West. In 1981, the two conferences agreed to a full merger, becoming the East and West Divisions of the CFL. With the merger came a fully balanced and interlocking schedule of 16 games per season (with all nine teams playing each other twice, once at home and once on the road). Since 1986 (with the exception of 2021), the CFL's regular season schedule has been 18 games.

The separate histories of the Big Four and the WIFU accounted for the fact that two teams had basically the same name: the Big Four's Ottawa Rough Riders were often called the "Eastern Riders", while the WIFU's Saskatchewan Roughriders were called the "Western Riders" or "Green Riders". Other team names had traditional origins. With rowing a national craze in the late 19th century, the Argonaut Rowing Club of Toronto formed a rugby team for its members' off-season participation. The football team name Toronto Argonauts still remains even though it and the rowing club have long since gone their separate ways. After World War II, the Hamilton Tigers absorbed the upstart war-era Flying Wildcats and called the team the Hamilton Tiger-Cats. The league remained stable with nine franchises—the BC Lions, Calgary Stampeders, Edmonton Eskimos, Saskatchewan Roughriders, Winnipeg Blue Bombers, Hamilton Tiger-Cats, Toronto Argonauts, Ottawa Rough Riders and Montreal Alouettes—from its inception until 1981. After the 1981 season, the Alouettes folded and were replaced in 1982 with a new franchise, the Concordes. In 1986, the Concordes were renamed the Alouettes to attract more fan support, but the team folded the next year. The loss of the Montreal franchise forced the league to move its easternmost Western team, Winnipeg, into the East Division from 1987 to 1994.

=== United States expansion ===
In 1993, the league admitted its first United States-based franchise, the Sacramento Gold Miners. After modest success, the league then expanded further in the U.S. in 1994 with the Las Vegas Posse, Baltimore Stallions, and Shreveport Pirates. For the 1995 campaign, the American teams were split off into their own South Division, and two more teams, the Birmingham Barracudas and Memphis Mad Dogs, were added; at the same time, the Posse folded and the Gold Miners moved, becoming the San Antonio Texans. In 1995, the Stallions became the only non-Canadian team to win the Grey Cup.

Despite all American teams having the advantage of not being bound to the CFL's minimum Canadian player quotas, only the Stallions proved to be an on-field and off-field success. The establishment of the National Football League's (NFL) Baltimore Ravens, worsening financial problems among the league's core Canadian teams, and the inconsistent performance of the other American teams prompted the CFL to abandon its American experiment and retrench its Canadian operations. The Stallions organization was used as the basis for a revival of the Montreal Alouettes.

=== Post-U.S. expansion era ===
The CFL returned to an all-Canadian format in 1996 with nine teams; the league conducted a dispersal draft to distribute players from the disbanded American-based teams; however, the Ottawa Rough Riders, in existence since 1876, folded after the 1996 season (another dispersal draft was conducted the next year to distribute the former Rough Rider players among the remaining eight teams). Toronto and recently revived Montreal also were struggling; Montreal's woes were solved by moving to Percival Molson Memorial Stadium, a much smaller venue than the cavernous Olympic Stadium. The Winnipeg team again moved to the East Division from 1997 to 2001 to make up for the loss of Ottawa.

In 1997, the NFL provided a US$3-million interest-free loan to the financially struggling CFL, with NFL commissioner Paul Tagliabue stating "We want to see football succeed wherever it's played". In return, the NFL was granted access to CFL players entering a defined two-month window in the option year of their contract. This was later written into the CFL's collective bargaining agreement with its players. The CFL's finances have since stabilized and they eventually repaid the loan. The CFL–NFL agreement expired in 2006. Both leagues attempted to reach a new agreement, but the CFL broke off negotiations in November 2007 after Canadian telecommunications firm Rogers Communications paid $78 million to host seven Bills games in Toronto over five seasons (the last Bills Toronto Series game was played during the 2013 NFL season).

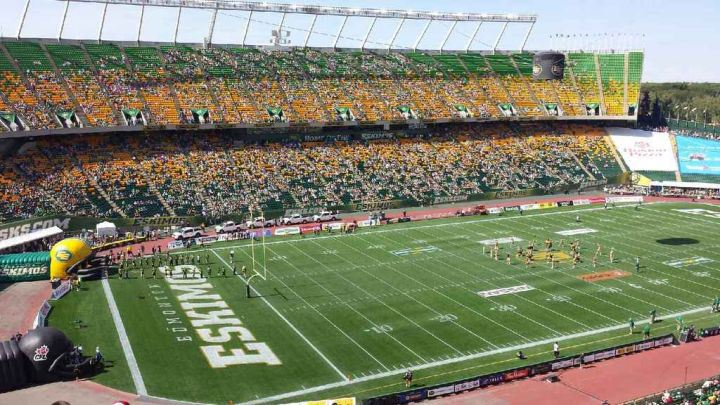
Edmonton's Commonwealth Stadium (shown during player introductions prior to a game) is the largest venue in the CFL.

In 2002, the league expanded back to having nine teams with the creation of the Ottawa Renegades. After four seasons of financial losses, the Renegades were suspended indefinitely before the 2006 season; their players were absorbed by the remaining teams in a dispersal draft. Winnipeg was moved to the East Division again in 2006, a situation that continued until 2013.

In 2005, the league set an all-time attendance record with a total attendance of more than 2.3 million. In June 2006, the league announced the launch of CFL Broadband, an internet streaming service designed to provide fans with another media platform, in addition to TSN and CBC broadcasts, to watch games live.

==== Mark Cohon era (2007–2015) ====
With Mark Cohon as commissioner of the league the CFL entered a period of stability and growth. New television deals, two new collective bargaining agreements, the 100th Grey Cup celebration, and widespread stadium renovation and rebuilding highlighted this era. The 100th anniversary of the Grey Cup had the highest ever television ratings for a championship game in English Canada.

During the 2000s, the CFL had the third highest per-game attendance of any North American sports league and the seventh highest per-game attendance of any sports league worldwide. A 2006 survey conducted at the University of Lethbridge confirmed that the CFL was the second most popular sports league in Canada, with the following of 19% of the total adult Canadian population compared to 30% for the NHL. The NFL had 11% following, with a total of 26% following at least one of the pro football leagues. In other words, approximately 80% of Canadian football fans follow the CFL, and about 55% follow the NFL. With the absence of Ottawa from 2006 to 2013, league attendance hovered around the 2 million mark. It stood at 2,029,875 in 2012 for a single game average of 28,193. The 2007 season was a recent high point with average game attendance of 29,167, the best since 1983.

During Mark Cohon's time in office, many of the teams either undertook major renovations to their existing stadiums, or constructed brand new stadiums. The Montreal Alouettes were the first to undertake this project, adding 5,000 seats to Percival Molson Memorial Stadium in time for the 2010 CFL season. The Edmonton Eskimos and Calgary Stampeders also renovated their respective stadiums and facilities for the 2010 season. In 2011, the BC Lions played under a new, retractable roof in BC Place after spending one and a half seasons at Empire Field. In 2013, the Winnipeg Blue Bombers moved to Investors Group Field, now known as Princess Auto Stadium, an entirely new stadium at the University of Manitoba. The Hamilton Tiger-Cats began using their new stadium, Tim Hortons Field, after spending 2013 at University of Guelph's stadium and the first half of the 2014 season at McMaster University's football field following the demolition of the iconic Ivor Wynne Stadium.

In 2014, the Ottawa Redblacks kicked off their inaugural season (having been awarded a franchise in 2008), becoming the third Ottawa franchise in CFL history. The new Ottawa franchise returned the league to a nine-team structure, with five teams in the West Division and four in the East; the Winnipeg Blue Bombers moved back to the West Division. The expansion Ottawa Redblacks played at the massively renovated Frank Clair Stadium, now branded as TD Place Stadium.

In Mark Cohon's last year as commissioner, he negotiated a new five-year collective bargaining agreement (from 2014 through the 2018 season) between the CFL and the Canadian Football League Players' Association (CFLPA).

==== Jeffrey Orridge era (2015–2017) ====
The Toronto Argonauts entered a period of transition off the field, with new ownership and a new stadium. The Argonauts were sold by politician/businessman David Braley to Bell Media and MLSE chairman Larry Tanenbaum. At the start of the 2016 season the Argos moved to BMO Field after more than twenty seasons at the Rogers Centre (formerly called the SkyDome from 1989 to 2005). Construction on the New Mosaic Stadium for the Saskatchewan Roughriders was completed in October 2016 and the first game was played in the 2017 season.

In 2015, Michael Sam signed a two-year contract with the Montreal Alouettes of the CFL, becoming the first openly gay player in the league's history. Sam left the team the day before the first preseason game, citing personal reasons. As reported by Fox Sports, Sam returned to Montreal to continue his professional football career. He left again on August 14, this time permanently, again citing personal reasons.

Immediately following the 2015 season Jeffrey Orridge announced a re-branding for the CFL, including a new logo, motto, uniforms for all nine teams and website. After not having a drug enforcement policy in effect for the 2015 season the league and the CFLPA agreed to a new drug policy. In 2017, the Board of Governors and Orridge agreed to part ways, effective June 30, 2017; Orridge cited "differing views on the future of the league" between him and the Board of Governors for the departure, with both sides stating the decision was mutual and amicable. His last day as commissioner was June 15, 2017. Jim Lawson, the CFL's Chair of the Board of Governors, took over the duties of interim Commissioner until a suitable replacement was found.

==== Randy Ambrosie era (2017–2025) ====
On July 5, 2017, Randy Ambrosie succeeded Orridge as CFL commissioner. Having spent nine seasons as a player with the Calgary Stampeders, Toronto Argonauts and Edmonton Eskimos from 1985 to 1993, Ambrosie is the first commissioner to have played in the league since Larry Smith left the position in 1997. New Era Cap Company, headquartered in Buffalo, New York, became the official apparel supplier of the CFL beginning in 2019, replacing Adidas.

In October 2018, the CFL began focusing marketing internationally again after the unsuccessful expansion into the United States during the 1990s, with Ambrosie's plan being called CFL 2.0. Ambrosie partnered with the Professional American Football League of Mexico (LFA) for player development, as part of the league's plan to expand globally. Ambrosie also later announced a special edition of the CFL Combine to be held in 2019 in Mexico for Mexican players, which was held on January 13, 2019. Ambroise said he wished the combine in Mexico to become annual, and that a combine could be held in Europe. On January 14, 2019, the league held a draft of LFA and Mexican university players where wide receiver Diego Viamontes was the first pick, selected by the Edmonton Eskimos. The CFL announced in February 2019 that German and French football players from the German Football League and the Fédération française de football américain would participate in the CFL national combine. Throughout early 2019, Ambrosie actively travelled Europe forming partnerships between the CFL and top-level European American football leagues and associations, specifically Germany (GFL), Austria (AFL), France (FFFA), the Nordic countries (NL, VL, SS and NAFL) and Italy (IFL). By January 2020, football leagues from 13 countries had signed partnerships with the CFL, these partnerships included mutual exchanging of players and coaches with leagues like the Mexican LFA holding reserved roster spots for Canadians with up to 25 playing in the league's 2020 season. In February 2020, the CFL expanded its global alliance system, welcoming the Japanese X-League, generally regarded the third-best professional gridiron league in the world. This coincided with the CFL announcing that its global combine in 2020 with new rules, including two designated active-roster international players and three practice-squad international players with as many as 45 global players in the league.

The league took over operations of the Montreal Alouettes prior to the 2019 season after Robert C. Wetenhall, the league's last non-Canadian owner, surrendered the franchise to the league in May. The Alouettes found new ownership in January 2020 in Crawford Steel executives Sid Spiegel and Gary Stern, whose holding company S and S Sportsco would oversee the team.

On August 17, 2020, the CFL cancelled its 2020 season after coronavirus-related social distancing mandates and travel restrictions imposed in most of Canada prevented the league from selling tickets and the league was unable to secure a bailout from the federal government to cover any losses. It was the first cancelled season in the league's history, and the first year without a Grey Cup championship since the canceled 1916–1919 seasons. The league returned in 2021, playing a shortened 14-game schedule which began that August, with the season concluding with the Grey Cup game in December for the first time since 1972. On March 10, 2021, the then-on hiatus XFL entered into talks with the CFL over the possibility of a future collaboration; the discussions were called off four months later with nothing coming of them.

On August 29, 2022, Gary Stern of the Montreal Alouettes stepped away from day-to-day operations with the club and resigned from his role with the Canadian Football League's board of governors, effective immediately. On February 14, 2023, the ownership of the Alouettes was transferred back to the CFL. Mario Cecchini was appointed as the interim president while the league sought to finalize a sale to new ownership. On March 10, Quebec media mogul and former Parti Québécois leader Pierre Karl Péladeau purchased the team. On April 11, 2024, the Winnipeg Blue Bombers announced league record revenue of $50.5million and operating profit of $5.7 million.

On October 26, 2024, Ambrosie announced his intention to retire from the commissioner's role in 2025, once a successor is found. Ambrosie had allegedly lost a vote of confidence among the league's owners the day prior, a report that neither the league nor Ambrosie would confirm nor deny.

==== Stewart Johnston era (2025–present) ====
On April 2, 2025, TSN president Stewart Johnston was announced as Ambrosie's successor, officially assuming the role on April 24, 2025.

On September 22, 2025, the CFL announced future rule changes to be implemented over the next two seasons, particularly to the playing surface and the scoring of a rouge. These changes include moving the goal posts from the goal line to the back of the end zone, shortening the end zone from 20 to 15 yards and the field from 110 to 100 yards, implementing a new 35-second play clock that will automatically begin as soon as the previous play is whistled dead, having team benches on opposite sides of the field, and scoring a rouge only if the ball isn't advanced out of the end zone. The field changes are scheduled to occur in 2027, while all other rules will begin in 2026. The changes were met with criticism from some, notably from Canadian quarterback Nathan Rourke who called them "garbage", while some feared the rules will make the sport too "American" and look similar to the NFL.

On April 15, 2026, the Winnipeg Blue Bombers reported an operating profit of $12.1 million with a record operating revenue of $82.8 million for the 2025 season, after hosting the 112th Grey Cup, and selling-out every game.

On April 28, 2026, the CFL announced changes to both the regular season and postseason beginning in the 2027 season. Changes include moving the season start date to Victoria Day weekend and adding four more playoff games, while expanding to eight postseason teams. The first round of the playoffs will consist of two "division showdown" games between the top two teams in each division, and two play-in games between the 5th and 8th, and 6th and 7th place teams in the league. The winners of the division showdown games will advance to the semifinals, while the losers will compete against the winners of the play-in games for a chance to advance to the semifinals.

== Teams ==
As of its 2026 season, nine teams compete in the Canadian Football League, including four based in Eastern Canada and five in Western Canada, respectively, organized under the league's East and West divisions. Eight are charter members from the league's inaugural 1958 season: the BC Lions, Calgary Stampeders, Edmonton Elks (formerly Eskimos), Hamilton Tiger-Cats, Montreal Alouettes, (Note: The CFL considers the current Montreal Alouettes franchise to be a continuation of the original Montreal Alouettes (founded 1946, played in the CFL 1958–1981) and Montreal Concordes (founded 1982, renamed the Montreal Alouettes in 1986, folded just before the 1987 season). However this does not include the Montreal Football Club that was formed in 1872, and joined the IRFU in 1907–1915, and the Montreal AAA Winged Wheelers, who played in the IRFU during the 1930s and 40s, winning the Grey Cup in 1931. While the current incarnation of the Alouettes inherited many of the players and staff of the Baltimore Stallions, the CFL considers the Stallions a separate entity.) Saskatchewan Roughriders, Toronto Argonauts, and Winnipeg Blue Bombers. Although expansion teams have joined the league throughout its history, especially during the league's brief expansion into the United States, only the Ottawa Redblacks continue to play.

Active CFL teams
Division	Team	City	Stadium	Capacity	Founded (lineage)	Head coach	General manager	Owner	Chairperson
East	Hamilton Tiger-Cats	Hamilton, Ontario	Hamilton Stadium	24,000	1950 (1869) (Note: The Hamilton Tiger-Cats were created in 1950 as a merger between the Hamilton Tigers (founded in 1869 as the Hamilton Football Club) and the Hamilton Wildcats (founded in 1941).)	Scott Milanovich	Vacant	Hamilton Sports Group	Bob Young
East	Montreal Alouettes	Montreal, Quebec	Percival Molson Memorial Stadium	20,025	1996 (1946)	Jason Maas	Danny Maciocia	Pierre Karl Péladeau	
East	Ottawa Redblacks	Ottawa, Ontario	TD Place Stadium	24,000	2014 (1876) (Note: All Ottawa clubs including the previous Rough Riders (1876–1996) and Renegades (2002–2006) are combined with the current Redblacks for historical consistency only, even though the CFL considers them separate clubs.)	Ryan Dinwiddie		Ottawa Sports and Entertainment Group	Roger Greenberg
East	Toronto Argonauts	Toronto, Ontario	BMO Field	25,000	1873	Mike Miller	Michael Clemons	Maple Leaf Sports & Entertainment	Larry Tanenbaum
West	BC Lions	Vancouver, British Columbia	BC Place	54,320	1954	Buck Pierce	Ryan Rigmaiden	Amar Doman	
West	Calgary Stampeders	Calgary, Alberta	McMahon Stadium	35,400	1945	Dave Dickenson		Calgary Sports and Entertainment	N. Murray Edwards
West	Edmonton Elks	Edmonton, Alberta	Commonwealth Stadium	56,302	1949 (1911) (Note: While football in Edmonton was first played in 1890, the Edmonton Elks (in their current incarnation) recognize their first season in 1949. This was further evidenced by the "60 seasons" decals worn on their helmets during the 2008 season.)	Mark Kilam	Ed Hervey	Deb Thompson	
West	Saskatchewan Roughriders	Regina, Saskatchewan	Mosaic Stadium	33,350	1910 (Note: Became the Saskatchewan Roughriders officially in 1950, after the team became the only pro football team left in the province in 1948. The Roughriders were originally called the Regina Rugby Football club from 1910 to 1924. then called the Regina Roughriders from 1925 to 1949.)	Corey Mace	Jeremy O'Day	Publicly owned (Note: Operated as nonprofit organization with ≤12,752 shareholders, as of 2026.)	Wayne Morsky
West	Winnipeg Blue Bombers	Winnipeg, Manitoba	Princess Auto Stadium	33,234	1930 (1887) (Note: Created by a merger of the Winnipegs and the St. John's team on June 10, 1930, and became known as the "Winnipeg Pegs" before changing to the current name, Blue Bombers, in 1937.)	Vacant	Kyle Walters	Winnipeg Football Club (Note: Operated as nonprofit organization without shareholders.)	Dayna Spiring

Defunct CFL teams
Team	City	Stadium	Years active
Baltimore FC / Baltimore Stallions	Baltimore, Maryland	Memorial Stadium	1994–1995 (Note: Franchise folded after the 1995 season. Owner and most players moved to the revived Montreal Alouettes in 1996; the league considers the Stallions a separate franchise from the Alouettes.)
Birmingham Barracudas	Birmingham, Alabama	Legion Field	1995
Las Vegas Posse	Las Vegas, Nevada	Sam Boyd Silver Bowl	1994
Memphis Mad Dogs	Memphis, Tennessee	Liberty Bowl Memorial Stadium	1995
Montreal Alouettes (1)	Montreal, Quebec	Autostade & Olympic Stadium	1946–1981
Montreal Concordes / Alouettes (2)	Montreal, Quebec	Autostade & Olympic Stadium	1982–1987
Ottawa Rough Riders	Ottawa, Ontario	Frank Clair Stadium	1876–1996
Ottawa Renegades	Ottawa, Ontario	Frank Clair Stadium	2002–2005
Sacramento Gold Miners	Sacramento, California	Hornet Stadium	1993–1994
San Antonio Texans (2)	San Antonio, Texas	Alamodome	1995 (Note: The San Antonio Texans (1) formed in 1993, but folded before playing a game. The San Antonio Texans (2) were the former Sacramento Gold Miners, who relocated to San Antonio in 1995.)
Shreveport Pirates	Shreveport, Louisiana	Independence Stadium	1994–1995

Proposed CFL teams
Team	City	Planned debut	Result of proposal
Proposed London team	London, Ontario	1974	(Note: An unknown investment group attempted an expansion bid and the CFL quoted a price of CA$2,700,000 for a team. It is unknown for what reasons this team never began play. This team would likely have been a continuation of the ORFU London Lords, which ultimately folded the same year.)
Atlantic Schooners (1)	Halifax/Dartmouth, Nova Scotia	1984	(Note: Venture was abandoned due to a failed financing plan for a new stadium.)
San Antonio Texans (1)	San Antonio, Texas	1993	
Proposed Mississippi team	Jackson, Mississippi	1995	(Note: While numerous locations (including Milwaukee and Los Angeles) had been discussed as a home for a potential relocation of the Las Vegas Posse, Jackson, Mississippi, came the closest to fruition: it had hired a coach and general manager and was included on early drafts of the 1995 schedule before the corporation that owned the Posse raised the price unexpectedly to more than could be justified just as the new owner was about to buy the team.)
Miami Manatees	Miami, Florida	1995	(Note: After exploring multiple cities to relocate the Las Vegas Posse, Miami was chosen. However, the league suspended all US operations before the team could ever take the field. Both the Mississippi and the Miami teams were to use the franchise of the Las Vegas Posse. Mississippi was included on the 1995 draft schedule, but disagreements with the Posse's ownership led to the sale falling through. The Miami ownership group would have put the franchise back onto the field in 1996, but the league withdrew from the United States prior to the 1996 season.)
Proposed Houston team	Houston, Texas	1996	(Note: After most US CFL franchises folded, the Baltimore Stallions considered relocating to Houston; league pressure led Stallions ownership to reactivate the then-dormant Montreal Alouettes instead.)
Norfolk Pirates/Hampton Roads Pirates	Norfolk, Virginia, or Hampton, Virginia	1996	(Note: After two seasons in Shreveport, posting an 8–28 record, Shreveport Pirates owner Lonie Glieberman intended to relocate the team to Virginia. There, he agreed to rename them the Hampton Roads Pirates or Norfolk Pirates if the city paid $400,000 for stadium renovations. Local politicians declined Glieberman's request upon learning that he had lawsuits pending in Louisiana.)
Proposed second Shreveport team	Shreveport, Louisiana	1996	(Note: Investment group Ark-LA-Tex Football Association had prepared to purchase the Birmingham Barracudas for $750,000 and relocate them to Shreveport, replacing the former Pirates; however, the CFL cancelled its US expansion before the relocation could take place.)
Proposed Milwaukee team	Milwaukee, Wisconsin	1996	(Note: As the Las Vegas Posse looked for a place to relocate the floundering franchise, Milwaukee, backed by real estate developer Marvin Fishman and original owner of the Milwaukee Bucks looked to bring a CFL team to the city. The bid saw then CFL Commissioner Larry Smith giving a press conference at Milwaukee County Stadium, but the proposal fell through when the CFL suspended its US operations.)
Proposed Quebec City team	Quebec City, Quebec	2006	(Note: As the Ottawa Renegades' financial woes became apparent, a business group from Quebec City emerged attempting to relocate the team to their city. The venture was ultimately abandoned and the franchise was suspended by the league and later sold to Ottawa Sports and Entertainment Group.)
Atlantic Schooners (2)	Halifax, Nova Scotia, or Moncton, New Brunswick	2021	(Note: Committed to by the league in 2021. In 2023 Schooners Sports and Entertainment abandoned its involvement in pursuing a team for Atlantic Canada.)

=== Timeline ===
Note: team franchise history is listed as it is recognized by the CFL in its publication CFL Guide & Record Book (2025).

== Season structure ==
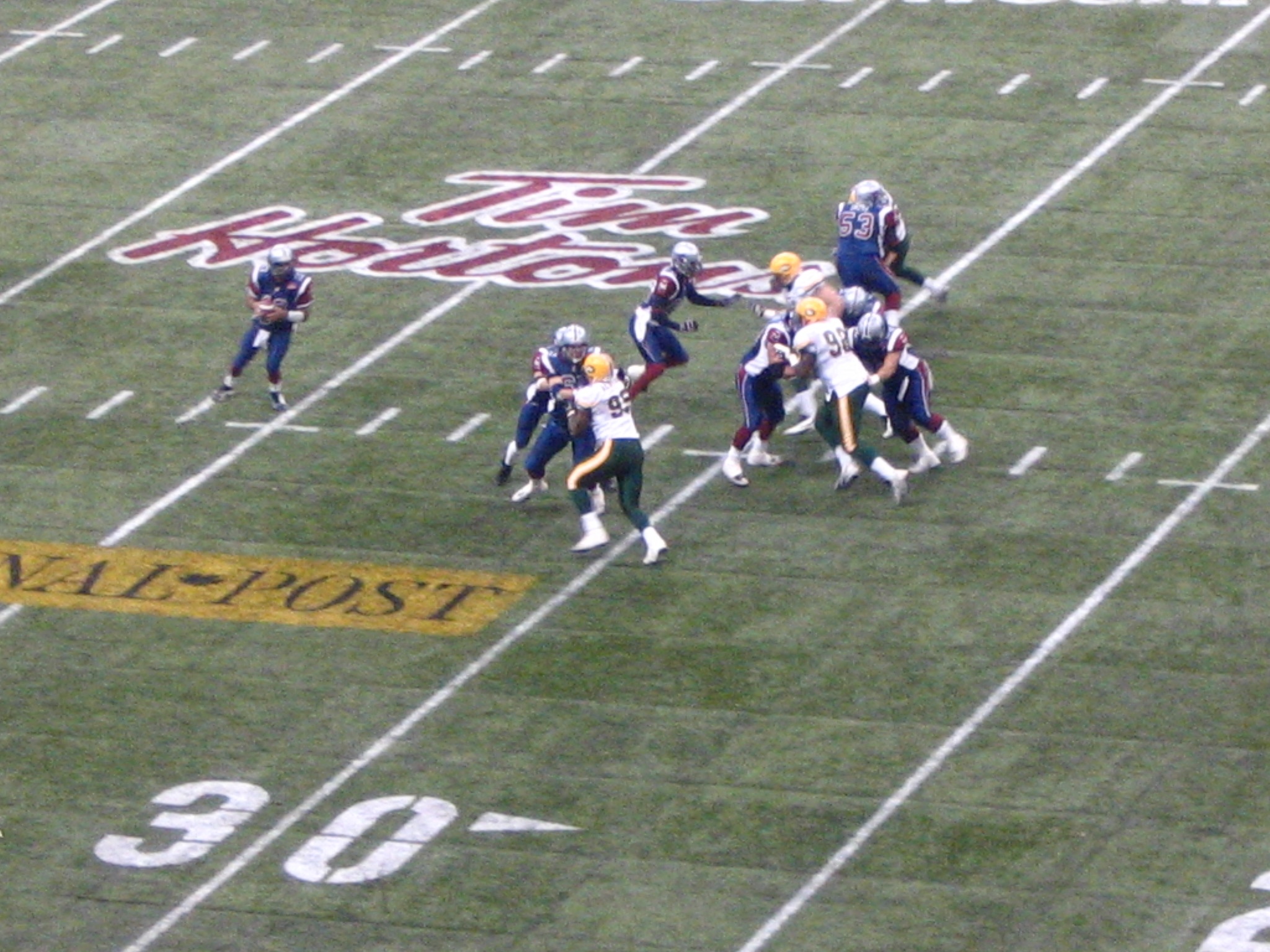
Montreal Alouettes quarterback Anthony Calvillo has the ball and looks downfield during the 2005 Grey Cup game against the Edmonton Eskimos at BC Place in Vancouver.

Since 2022, the CFL season has included:

- A two-game, three-week exhibition season (or pre-season) in late May to early June
- An 18-game, 21-week regular season running from early June to late October
- A six-team, three-week single elimination playoff tournament beginning in early November and culminating in the Grey Cup championship in late November. Championship teams will play either two or three playoff games, including the Grey Cup game, depending on their standing at the end of the regular season. The division leaders at the end of the regular season receive byes in the first round of the playoffs.

=== Preseason ===
Team training camps open 28 days prior to the first regular season game of the season, a camp solely devoted to first year players is allowed the three days before the main camp opens. The pre-season exhibition schedule is two weeks long with each team playing two games against teams from its own division.

=== Regular season ===
The regular season is 21 weeks long, with games beginning in early June and finishing by late October. With 18 regular season games being played, each team gets three bye weeks. The CFL's nine current teams are divided into two divisions: the East Division with four teams and the West Division, with five teams.

From the 1986 season until the COVID-19 pandemic (other than during the U.S. expansion when the league had twelve and thirteen teams) each team played two games against each of the other eight teams, plus two or four additional divisional games with opponents rotating each season. This format was changed when the league resumed play in 2021 to create a greater emphasis on divisional play. Under the eighteen game format, each Eastern team played ten games within their division and eight games against Western opponents, thus playing two of the Western teams once (one at home and one on the road) and the other three Western teams twice, while playing two Eastern opponents three times and one division rival four times. Three of the Western teams played each division rival three times, two Eastern teams twice and two Eastern teams once. The remaining two Western teams played three of the Eastern opponents twice and one of the Eastern opponents once, while playing each other twice and the other Western teams three times. The CFL returned to the previous more balanced format beginning in the 2024 season.

The most popular featured week in the CFL season is the Labour Day Classic, played over the course of the Labour Day weekend, where the matchups feature the first half of home-and-home series between the traditional geographic rivalries of Toronto–Hamilton (often called the Battle of the QEW, a rivalry which began in 1873), Edmonton–Calgary (see Battle of Alberta), Winnipeg–Saskatchewan, and Ottawa–Montreal. In years that Ottawa or Montreal were not in the league, BC played against one of these teams. The following week's rematch of these games is a popular event as well, especially in recent years, where the rematch of the Saskatchewan–Winnipeg game has been dubbed the Banjo Bowl.

Other features of the regular season schedule are the Hall of Fame Game and the Thanksgiving Day Classic, the one or two games held on Thanksgiving where the match ups usually do not feature traditional rivalries. From 2010 to 2013, a neutral site regular season game was played in Moncton under the name Touchdown Atlantic. The neutral site games returned in 2019 and were also played in 2022, 2023, and 2024.

The league awards points based on regular season results (much like in most ice hockey leagues, but unlike the NFL, which strictly uses winning percentages to determine their standings; two points are awarded for a win, one for a tie and none for a loss). As of the 2021 season, in the event two or more teams in a division finish the season with the same number of points, the tie is broken based on the following criteria (in descending order), with coin tosses used if all such tie-breaker steps fail:

- Number of wins in all games;
- Winning percentage in games between the tied teams;
- Net aggregate of points scored (i.e. total points scored less total points conceded) between the tied teams;
- Net quotient of points scored (i.e. total points scored divided by total points conceded) between the tied teams;
- Winning percentage in divisional games;
- Net aggregate of points scored in divisional games;
- Net quotient of points scored in divisional games;
- Net aggregate of points scored in all games;
- Net quotient of points scored in all games.

=== Playoffs ===
The playoffs are in November. After the regular season, the top team from each division has an automatic home berth in the division final, and a bye week during the division semifinal. The second-place team from each division hosts the third-place team in the division semifinal, unless a fourth-place team from one division finishes with a better record than a third place team in the other (this provision is known as the crossover rule, and while it implies that it is possible for two teams in the same division to play for the Grey Cup, only five crossover teams have won a semifinal since the rule's 1996 inception, and none of them have advanced to the Grey Cup). The winners of each division's semifinal game then travel to play the first place teams in the division finals. The two division champions then face each other in the Grey Cup game, which has been held on the third Sunday of November since 2022. In 2021, the game was played in December, which was the first time this had happened since 1972.

A new playoff format will be used from 2027, echoing the "Final Eight" system used in the Australian Football League (AFL). The top two teams in each division face off in the "division showdown" round, hosted by the first placed team in the division, with the losers of each match competing against the winners of the play-in round (consisting of the top four remaining teams in the standings) in the "elimination games". The winners of the division showdown games host the winners of the elimination games in the Grey Cup semi-finals for the right to compete in the Grey Cup game, now held on the first Sunday of November following the start of the season being pushed up to Victoria Day weekend.

=== Grey Cup ===
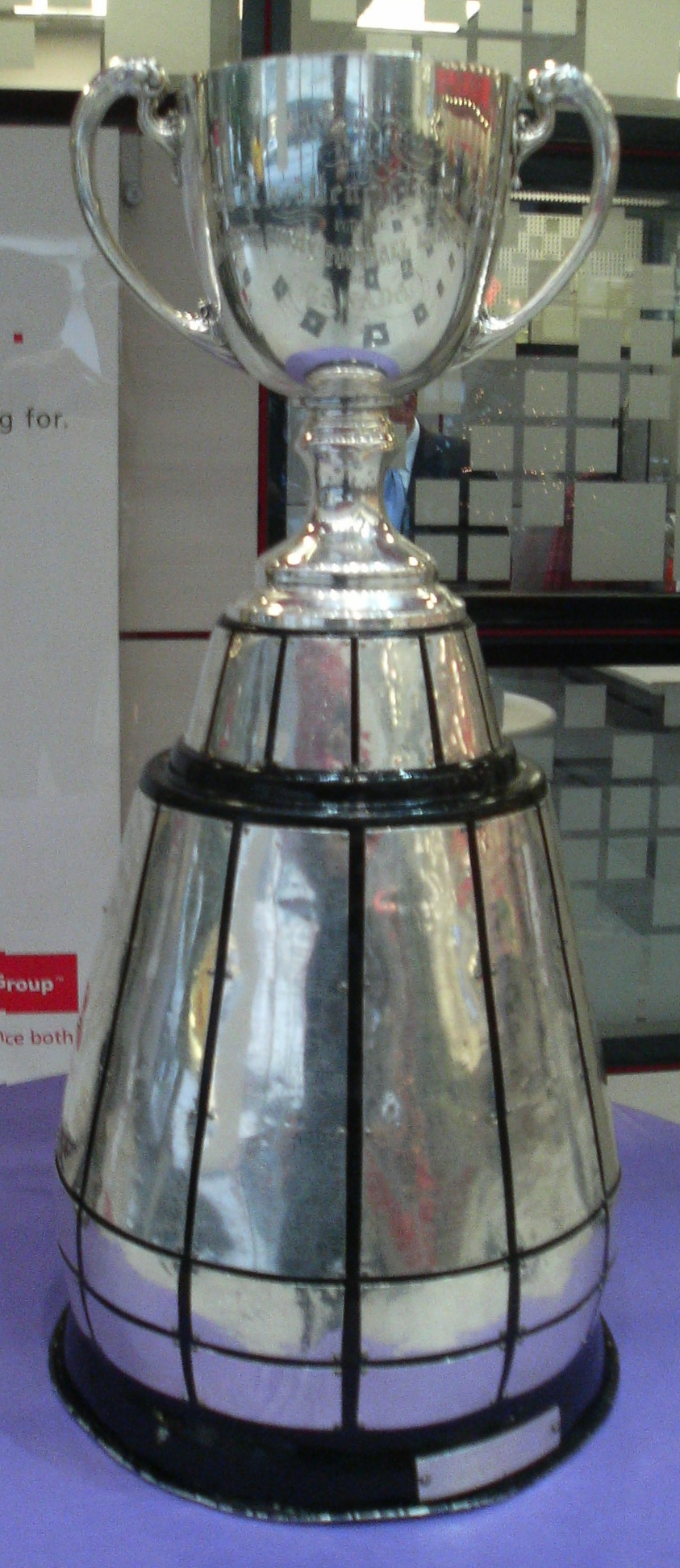
The Grey Cup

The Grey Cup is both the name of the championship of the CFL and the name of the trophy awarded to the victorious team. The Grey Cup is the second-oldest trophy in North American professional sports, after the Stanley Cup. The Grey Cup game is hosted in one of the league's member cities. In recent years, it has been hosted in a different city every year, selected two or more years in advance. The Toronto Argonauts have won the most Grey Cups with 19 wins total, most recently in 2024. In 2013, the Grey Cup was won at home for the third consecutive time (by the Saskatchewan Roughriders), which had not been done since Toronto won at home from 1945 to 1947. In 2016, the Grey Cup was won on the natural grass turf of BMO Field by the Ottawa Redblacks beating the heavily favoured Calgary Stampeders 39–33 in overtime; the first Grey Cup championship for any Ottawa CFL team in 40 years.

As the country's single largest annual sporting event, the Grey Cup has long served as an unofficial Canadian autumn festival generating national media coverage and a large amount of revenue for the host city. Many fans travel from across the country to attend the game and the week of festivities which precedes it. Since 2015, the Grey Cup game's presenting sponsor is Shaw Communications.

=== Awards ===
Following the Grey Cup game, the Grey Cup Most Valuable Player and Grey Cup Most Valuable Canadian are selected. A number of league individual player awards, such as the Most Outstanding Player and Most Outstanding Defensive Player, are awarded annually at a special ceremony in the host city during the week before the Grey Cup game; this ceremony is broadcast nationally on TSN. The Annis Stukus Trophy, also known as the Coach of the Year Award, is awarded separately at a banquet held during the off-season each February. While the CFL has not held an all-star game since 1988, an All-Star Team is selected and honoured at the league awards ceremony during Grey Cup week.

== Broadcasting ==
The CFL Championship game, the Grey Cup, previously held the record for the largest television audience in Canadian history. Television coverage on CBC, CTV and Radio-Canada of the 1983 Grey Cup attracted a viewing audience of 8,118,000 people as Toronto edged B.C. 18–17, ending a 31-year championship drought for the Argonauts. At the time, this represented 33% of the Canadian population. This has since been surpassed by the 2002 and 2010 Men's Olympic Gold Medal Hockey Game.

=== Canadian broadcasters ===
The Canadian Football Network was the league's broadcaster from 1987 to 1990. Since TSN became the league's exclusive broadcast partner in 2009, Paul Graham produced coverage for all Grey Cup games until 2024. TSN's French-language network RDS broadcasts Montreal Alouettes games for the Quebec television market. Games are typically scheduled for Thursday to Saturday evenings during June, July and August, but switch to more Saturday and Sunday afternoon games during September and October. TSN has created a tradition of at least one Friday night game each week, branded as Friday Night Football. CBC and TSN drew record television audiences for CFL broadcasts in 2005. The 2006 season was the first season in which every regular-season game was televised, as the league implemented an instant replay challenge system. In 2006, the CFL also began offering pay-per-view webcasts of every game on CFL Broadband. Until the end of the 2007 season, CBC and RDS were the exclusive television broadcasters for all playoff games, including the Grey Cup, which regularly draws a Canadian viewing audience in excess of 4 million.

In 2008, the CFL began a new, five-year television deal with CTVglobemedia (now Bell Media). Valued at $16 million per-year, it gave TSN and RDS exclusive rights to all CFL games, including the playoffs and Grey Cup. In March 2013, TSN exercised an option to extend its contract through 2018. In 2015, the deal was extended for an additional three years, along with exclusive Grey Cup rights for Bell Media Radio stations.

In June 2024, Bell Media announced that CTV would broadcast TSN-produced 2024 season coverage on digital terrestrial television, including a late-season package of exclusive 3 p.m. ET games beginning on September 7, continuing with playoff coverage of the East Division, and concluding with a simulcast of the 111th Grey Cup; returning the CFL to over-the-air television for the first time since 2007. As of 2024, the CFL's agreement with TSN, CTV and RDS runs through the 2026 CFL season. As of January 2026, the CFL was seeking an extension with Bell, setting a target of the start of the 2026 season, and that the league had full intention of maintaining Bell's exclusivity in the new contract, preemptively rejecting any competing effort to purchase rights. On May 28, 2026, the CFL announced a six-year extension to Bell Media's contract beginning with the 2027 season, whilst also announcing a separate deal with DAZN to exclusively stream one weekly Saturday night game and two playoff games on the platform.

=== Foreign coverage ===
The CFL's U.S. broadcast rights returned to the ESPN Networks for the 2013 season, with five games airing on ESPN2, and 55 airing on ESPN3. This agreement was renewed in 2014 for five years, the same length as the TSN deal (ESPN holds a stake in TSN), with a stipulation that at least 17 games would be carried on ESPN2 (or another ESPN network, such as ESPN or ESPNEWS) each season, including the Grey Cup; this gives ESPN exclusive CFL rights during this time frame. Originally ESPN3 carried all games not carried on one of the linear channels online, later ESPN moved those games to ESPN+.

ESPN has had a long relationship with the CFL; the channel broadcast its first CFL game on July 9, 1980, when the network was 10 months old. On April 27, 2023, CBS Sports Network announced a multi-year broadcasting rights deal with the league, becoming the U.S. TV rightsholder to the league; the channel broadcast 34 CFL games during the first three months of the 2023 season. CBSSN's 2024 broadcast package consisted of the majority of June, July, and August games, and the Labour Day and Thanksgiving Day Classics.

ESPN Brasil began broadcasting CFL games live in Brazil in 2015, as a result of the growth of the NFL and college football fan base in Brazil. BT Sport, which has a licensing partnership with ESPN, has also carried CFL games in Britain and Ireland since 2015. In June 2019, the CFL signed a broadcast deal with MVS Comunicaciones to broadcast a game a week in Mexico on MVS TV.

=== Previous broadcasting arrangements ===
==== Canada ====
The public broadcaster CBC Television, which held a monopoly on Canadian television until 1961, held Canadian professional football broadcast rights beginning the year of its debut, 1952. The private, commercial CTV network was created in 1961 in part because Toronto businessman John W. H. Bassett had won the television rights to the Eastern Football Conference, and needed an outlet to air the games. From 1962 through 1986, CBC and CTV shared CFL broadcasting rights. They split playoff games and simulcast the Grey Cup. In 1962, 1965, 1967, 1968 and 1970, CTV commentators were used for the dual network telecast, while in 1963, 1964, 1966 and 1969, the CBC's announcers were provided. From 1971 through 1986, one network's crew called the first half while the other called the other half. After the 1986 season, CTV dropped coverage of the CFL and the Grey Cup. From 1987 through 1990, the CFL operated its own syndicated network, the CFN. Like CTV, CFN split playoff games with CBC. However, CFN had completely separate coverage of the Grey Cup, utilizing its own production and commentators. From 1991 to 2007, all post-season games had been exclusively on CBC; beginning in 2008, the Grey Cup and all other CFL games are exclusive to cable TV on TSN, although the cable provider reserves the right to move the game to sister network CTV (from 2008 to 2023, it had never done so, opting to broadcast that Sunday's NFL games on CTV instead.)

==== United States ====
The predecessor to the CFL's East Division, the IRFU, had a television contract with NBC in 1954 that provided far more coverage than the NFL's existing contract with DuMont. NBC aired games on Saturday afternoons, competing against college football broadcasts on CBS and ABC. The revenue from the contract allowed the IRFU to directly compete against the NFL for players in the late 1950s, setting up a series of CFL games in the United States beginning in 1958 and a series of interleague exhibitions beginning in 1959. Interest in the CFL in the United States faded dramatically after the debut of the American Football League in 1960.

In 1982, during a players' strike in the NFL, NBC broadcast CFL games in the United States in lieu of the NFL games which were cancelled; the first week of broadcasts featured the NFL on NBC broadcast teams, before a series of blowout games on the network and the resulting low ratings resulted in NBC cutting back and eventually cancelling its CFL coverage after only a few weeks. ESPN host Chris Berman became a fan of the game in the early days of ESPN, when the network first aired CFL games, and continues to cover the Canadian league on-air. The now-defunct FNN-SCORE (unrelated to the Canadian cable network formerly known as The Score [now Sportsnet 360]) carried games in the late 1980s. In the late 1980s and early 1990s, SportsChannel America carried games, using CBC Television, CFN and TSN feeds. In 1993, several SportsChannel Pacific-produced games that were part of the Sacramento Gold Miners' local package were also shown nationally.

Beginning in 1994, with four American teams in the league, ESPN reached a four-year deal with the league to produce and air two games per week and all post-season games on its fledgling ESPN2. They also put some games on the main network to fill broadcast time vacated by the 1994–95 Major League Baseball strike. The 1994 and 1995 Grey Cups were shown live on ESPN2 and then re-aired on ESPN the following day, leading into the network's Monday Night Countdown show. ESPN's on-air talent included a mix of the network's American football broadcasters and established CFL broadcasters from Canada. Most of the US-based teams also had deals with local carriers to show games that were not covered in the national package. Though there were no US teams in the league after 1995, ESPN2 continued showing games until 1997, albeit on a much lighter schedule.

The America One network (now defunct) held CFL broadcast rights in the United States from 2001 to 2009 and aired a majority of the league's games. Until the 2007 season, America One syndicated CFL games to regional sports networks like Altitude, NESN, and MASN; these were discontinued in 2008, mainly because America One and the CFL were able to reach a deal only days before the season began, not allowing the network time to establish agreements with individual RSNs. The Grey Cup aired on Versus on November 22, 2008, with a replay the next day on America One. From 2006 through the 2008 season, Friday Night Football was carried exclusively on World Sport HD in the United States; however, due to the January 2009 shutdown of that channel's parent company, Voom HD Networks, America One reclaimed those rights.

NFL Network took over the league broadcast contract in 2010. For the 2010 season, the network carried 14 games, no more than one each week. For 2011, the network increased its output to two games each week. NFL Network declined to continue its coverage after the 2011 season. It offered to pick up another package in 2019 on the condition that the league change its schedule to not directly compete with the NFL regular season, something that the CFL stated needs to be negotiated with the players' union. In late July 2012, the NBC Sports Network acquired rights to the CFL for the remainder of the 2012 season. The NBCSN deal included nine regular season games starting August 27 (including Labour Day Classic games) and all the playoffs. NBC Sports renewed their agreement with the CFL for the 2013 season. ESPN regained the U.S. CFL broadcast rights in 2014, airing games until 2022. The European ESPN America network carried a collection of CFL games as part of its lineup until the network shut down in 2013.

=== Internet ===
There are no blackout restrictions on radio broadcasts of CFL games, while TSN streams all games online for authenticated subscribers to participating television providers. The majority of games not on ESPN television channels are streamed in the United States via the subscription service ESPN+. In 2017, the league announced a partnership with Yare Media to offer subscription streaming packages in 130 international territories.

In 2023, the league announced the creation of CFL+, which made free, live streaming of every regular-season game available to all international viewers outside of the United States and Canada; for those in the United States, all games not being carried on CBS Sports Network were similarly available. In 2024, the league expanded functionality of CFL+ to include video on demand for up to 48 hours after the game and coverage of the league's preseason matches by combining in-stadium video feeds with local radio play-by-play and commentary. On May 28, 2026, the CFL announced a six-year deal with DAZN to broadcast all CFL games internationally outside of Canada and the United States from the 2027 season, effectively moving CFL+ onto the platform.

In recent years, games have been available on TSN streaming platforms, starting in 2014 with the TSN GO app and TSN.ca, which required users to sign-in with a cable provider. In 2018, TSN Direct was launched, which allowed fans to stream games without a cable subscription. In 2024, TSN+ started a data enhanced feed which features an augmented livestream version of the broadcast.

=== Radio ===
CFL teams have individual local broadcast contracts with terrestrial radio stations for regular season and playoff games, while TSN Radio owns the rights to the Grey Cup. In 2006, Sirius Satellite Radio gained exclusive rights for North American CFL satellite radio broadcasts and broadcast 25 CFL games per season, including the Grey Cup, through 2008. Sirius later extended its radio coverage through 2010, after which it merged with former rival XM Radio Canada to form SiriusXM Canada. The merged broadcaster continues to air CFL games, and as of 2022, is contracted to air the CFL until the 2023 season. English language broadcasts of every CFL game air on Canada Talks, with French-language broadcasts of the Montreal Alouettes broadcast on Influence Franco.

== Players and compensation ==
=== Salary cap (2025) ===
According to the new collective bargaining agreement, the 2025 salary cap was scheduled to be set at $5,650,000. However, on February 5, 2025, the league announced that the salary cap would grow by $412,365 to reach $6,062,365 (or $134,719 per active roster spot). The increase was driven by the revenue-growth sharing model which first went into effect in 2024, but this was the first year that it impacted the salary cap. The cap excludes unlimited non-football related services payments and preseason and playoff bonus money. The minimum player salary is set at $70,000, which remains unchanged since 2023. The revenue growth was not determined until the last week of January, and the CFL Player's Association was required to determine how they wanted the money applied, with options including increases to the salary cap, playoff bonuses, training camp stipends, and pension contributions. The timing of the announcement was questionable since the free-agency negotiating window had begun three days prior with teams operating with the old salary cap figure. CFLPA executive director David Mackie stated, "A reported $18-million boost in league revenues triggered the cap increase. The current collective bargaining agreement between the league and union, reached in 2022, contains a revenue-sharing formula."

=== Salary cap (2024) ===
According to the collective bargaining agreement, the 2024 salary cap was at least CA$5,585,000 (or CA$124,111 per active roster spot). This was the first season that players received revenue sharing, which was set at 25% for the 2024 season (or cap increase of 2.78% for every dollar increase). The salary cap is officially announced in late April every year as well as fines from the previous year. As was the case in 2023, the minimum player salary was set at CA$70,000.

=== CFL operations cap (2024) ===
As of the 2024 season, CFL teams have a CA$2,500,000 operations caps which limits the number of people per team drawing salaries for football operations to 11 coaches and 25 total people in total. That includes the general manager as well as scouts, video personnel, and equipment staff. For the 2025 season, the CFL Maximum Salary Expenditure Cap (SEC) is $6.062 million per team, a $412,365 increase over the minimum required increase in 2025. A schedule for the annual increases to the cap is laid out in the CBA.

=== Historical player compensation and revenue ===
The CFLPA agreed to include a provision allowing the CFL to enforce a salary cap in the 2002 Collective Bargaining Agreement (CBA), but the league began enforcing it only from the 2007 season ($4.05 million per team) onward. The cap was raised to $4.2 million in the 2008 season and remained at that level for 2009. Financial penalties for teams that breach the cap are set at $1 to $1 for the first $100,000 over, $2 to $1 for $100,000 to $300,000 over, and $3 to $1 for $300,000 and above. Penalties could also include forfeited draft picks. On June 29, 2010, a new collective bargaining agreement was ratified that raised the salary cap to $4.25 million for the 2010 CFL season and continued to increase by $50,000 each season until 2013. In 2014, a new CBA was ratified and the salary cap was raised to $5 million per team, with that amount increasing again by $50,000 each year until 2018. As per the 2019 collective bargaining agreement, the 2021 salary expenditure cap is scheduled to be $5,350,000 and with the minimum team salary set at $4,750,000. The salary cap number was subject to increase as players now have revenue sharing of 20% from broadcast deals (outside of TSN and ESPN), but since the league did not play in 2020, the cap number will likely be static.

For 2010, the minimum team salary was set at $3.9 million while the minimum player salary was set at $42,000. With the new CBA in 2014, the salary floor was raised to $4.4 million per team with increases of $50,000 per year, and the minimum salary was raised to $50,000 per year. The average salary per player in 2014 was CA$96,000. A new collective bargaining agreement was signed in 2019 that set the minimum annual player salary at $54,000, with that number increasing to $65,000 for National and American players in 2020. In 2019, Mike Reilly and Bo Levi Mitchell were the highest paid players in the CFL after signing contracts in February 2019 for average yearly salaries of over $700,000. Players designated as global players (see player designations) are paid the league minimum by rule and may have a portion of their salary sent back to their original home league as part of a partnership with the CFL.

Player compensation is not tied to league revenue, which remains a trade secret. Only the four publicly held teams in the league reveal their financial information, as those companies are required to do so under Canadian law. As of 2013, prior to Ottawa's rejoining the league (at which time Toronto, which is partially owned by a public company, was still fully private), estimates of the CFL's revenue varied between $150 million and CA$200 million. As of 2019, five of the CFL's nine teams (including all three community-owned franchises) are profitable, and four operate at a loss; those four teams lose more than the five profitable teams, resulting in a net loss of approximately CA$20 million overall.

=== Player designations ===
Players in the CFL carry nationality designations referring to their country of origin: Nationals ("a Canadian citizen at the time of signing his first contract, was classified as a non-import prior to May 21, 2019, was physically resident in Canada for an aggregate period of five years prior to reaching the age of 18, or played football for a minimum of three years at a U Sports institution, was draft eligible in 2021 at a minimum, and has graduated with a degree at that institution"), Americans (non-National and non-Global players, almost exclusively used for United States citizens), and Globals (any player who does not hold Canadian or American citizenship and does not qualify as a National in any other way). In prior versions of the CFL CBA and league rules, National players were known as non-import players and American players were known as international (2014–2018) and import (before 2014) players, with the criteria to qualify as a non-import player being more restrictive. Global players were introduced in 2019.

National players enter the CFL through the CFL draft or free agency. Global players enter the CFL in a similar method as national players, with exclusive drafts held only for eligible players. American players are typically inducted by way of the negotiation list: any team can lay unilateral claim to up to 45 players that have never played in the CFL at any given time (each team must make at least ten of those names public as of 2018), with no limit on how long a player can be held on the list and no limit on how old the player must be (thus CFL teams can claim players not yet eligible for the NFL draft). Once a player on a negotiation list expresses formal interest in joining the CFL, that team has up to ten days to offer a contract (usually a league-minimum, two-year contract) to retain the player's rights. While the full list of names league-wide were secret, held from the general public and the other teams, the negotiation lists for all teams were made publicly available on the CFL website in July 2025.

=== Roster limits ===
In 2006, the active roster limit was increased from 40 to 42, in 2014 it was again increased to 44, and in 2016 was increased to 46. An unlimited number of players may be put on a team's disabled, injured and suspended lists.

As of 2021, each team must abide by the National/American/Global ratio rule, which requires teams to have two quarterbacks, two Global players, and a maximum of 20 American players (excluding quarterbacks) with a minimum of 44 total active roster players and a maximum of 45. Each team will also have one player of any nationality on the reserve roster who receives the benefits of being on the active roster, but may not play in a game.

Through the 2018 season, quarterbacks, of which a team was required to carry three on a roster, were not allowed to be counted toward the national player requirement nor the starter requirement, which put Canadian quarterbacks at a disadvantage compared to other positions in being hired by a CFL franchise. This rule was changed in 2019 whereby teams had two roster spots for quarterbacks and a third quarterback counted in the ratio. Additionally, a National quarterback would be considered one of the club's National Starting Players as long as he remains on the field at the quarterback position.

Teams are additionally allowed up to 10 national or international players (with a minimum of one national if there are less than seven players or two nationals if there are at least seven players total) on their practice squad roster and may expand it to 12 if the team carries the maximum allowed two global practice squad players, though they are not required to do so. Every year, the practice squad roster is temporarily increased in size to 15 following the start of the National Football League's season to accommodate for the influx of cut NFL players. Unlike players on the active roster, players on the practice squad may be signed at any time to another team's active roster without compensation to the player's original team.

=== Labour representation ===
CFL players are represented by the Canadian Football League Players' Association (CFLPA). Each team elects two players to the CFLPA Board of Player Representatives, which meets once per year. Every two years, it elects an executive Board of Directors.

== Draft ==
Eligible Canadian nationals (usually from U Sports football domestically or American college football) are drafted by teams in the annual CFL draft. The draft usually takes place in May and currently consists of eight rounds. The first two rounds of the draft are usually shown live on TSN. The CFL Combine (formerly known as the CFL Evaluation Camp), similar to the NFL Combine, precedes the draft. A junior player in the locale of a team may be claimed as a territorial exemption and sign with that team before beginning collegiate play (one recent example is when the BC Lions claimed Andrew Harris). Teams maintain "negotiation lists" of players they wish to sign as free agents, which give them exclusive negotiation rights with that player if they wish to sign in the CFL. Players can be added or removed from these lists by the team at any time, and their signing rights can be used in trades.

In addition to the regular draft there the supplemental draft which provides teams an opportunity to select a player in the draft in exchange for forfeiting a pick in the next year's amateur draft. The selection order is done in reverse waiver priority order. The CFL supplemental draft allows teams to acquire eligible players who were not selected in the main CFL draft. Teams bid draft picks for the upcoming season, and the team with the highest bid wins the player and forfeits their corresponding draft pick. This process is similar to a bidding war, ensuring teams can add talent that might not have been available through the regular draft.

== Commissioners ==
Commissioners
Sydney Halter	1958–1966
Keith Davey	1967
Ted Workman (interim)	1967
Allan McEachern	1967–1968
Jake Gaudaur	1968–1984
Douglas Mitchell	1984–1988
Bill Baker (Note: In 1989, the commissioner role was split into two positions. Bill Baker held the title of President/Chief Operating Officer. Roy McMurtry, Q.C. held the position of Chairman/Chief Executive Officer. When Baker resigned, McMurtry continued as Chairman and CEO until Crump's appointment but did not serve as Acting Commissioner.)	1989
J. Donald Crump (Note: Between Donald Crump's resignation and Larry Smith's appointment, Phil Kershaw held the role of chairman but was not acting commissioner.)	1990–1991
Phil Kershaw (interim)	1992
Larry Smith	1992–1997
John Tory	1997–2000
Michael Lysko	2000–2002
David Braley (interim)	2002
Tom Wright	2002–2007
Mark Cohon	2007–2015
Jim Lawson (interim)	2015
Jeffrey Orridge	2015–2017
Jim Lawson (interim)	2017
Randy Ambrosie	2017–2025
Stewart Johnston	2025–present

== Board of Governors ==
The Board of Governors is the ultimate governing body for the league. The board oversees the leagues major business operations, structural policies, financial approvals, commissioner appointments, and official rule changes recommended by the league's committees. The board is led by the Commissioner, Chair, and Vice-Chair, and each member club is allowed up to three representatives on the board, usually consisting of team owners, presidents, or executives.

Position/Team	Board Representatives (2026)
Commissioner	Stewart Johnston
Chair	Scott Banda
Vice-Chair	Bob Young
British Columbia	Amar Doman
British Columbia	Duane Vienneau
British Columbia	-
Calgary	Robert Hayes
Calgary	Ziad Mehio
Calgary	Jay Mcneil
Edmonton	Deb Thompson
Edmonton	Rick LeLacheur
Edmonton	Chris Morris
Saskatchewan	Regan Exner
Saskatchewan	Craig Reynolds
Saskatchewan	-
Winnipeg	Mike Pyle
Winnipeg	Scott Sissons
Winnipeg	Wade Miller
Toronto	Dale Lastman
Toronto	Keith Pelley
Toronto	Chris Shewfelt
Hamilton	Scott Mitchell
Hamilton	Bob Young
Hamilton	Doug Rye
Ottawa	Roger Greenberg
Ottawa	John Ruddy
Ottawa	Adrian Sciarra
Montreal	Pierre Karl Péladeau
Montreal	Andre Brosseau
Montreal	Danny Maciocia

== Potential future expansion ==
Potential CFL expansion markets are the Maritimes, Quebec City, Saskatoon, Kitchener, London, and Windsor, all of which have lobbied for Canadian Football League franchises in recent years. During the 1970s and 1980s, Harold Ballard attempted multiple times (albeit all unsuccessfully) to secure a second CFL team for Toronto (either by way of expansion or by relocating the Hamilton Tiger-Cats), under the premise that Canada's largest city could support two teams.

=== Maritimes ===
Since the 1980s, the CFL has occasionally played exhibition and, later, regular-season games at various cities in the Maritimes, including Canada Games Stadium in Saint John, New Brunswick; Huskies Stadium in Halifax, Nova Scotia; and Moncton Stadium in Moncton, New Brunswick. The league conditionally approved an expansion franchise, the Atlantic Schooners, for play in the 1984 season, but the team never made it to play after plans for a stadium collapsed.

No city in the Maritimes has a permanent stadium that meets CFL standards. As of 2010, the largest stadium in the Maritimes is Croix-Bleue Medavie Stadium, which has 8,300 permanent seats and is expandable to 20,000 with temporary seats. A pre-season game, dubbed Touchdown Atlantic, was held in Halifax in the 2005 CFL season and regular season games were played in Moncton under the same branding in 2010, 2011, and 2013. All 20,000 seats for the 2010 Moncton game sold out in 32 hours; the 2013 game did not sell out. Former Commissioner Mark Cohon said that Moncton Stadium would require massive renovations to host a CFL team permanently. The cost of the required renovations would be the equivalent of building a brand-new stadium. In November 2015, the Halifax city council voted 9–7 against purchasing land that would then be used to build a 20,000-seat stadium. It was agreed that the price tag for the land was too much, but the close vote indicated municipal interest in building a near CFL sized stadium in Halifax.

==== Atlantic Schooners revival ====
In November 2017, the CFL conducted further discussions with a group in Halifax interested in securing a franchise for the city; the group made a "very credible" pitch to the CFL head office. According to TSN analyst Dave Naylor the group named 'Maritime Football Ltd.' consists of Anthony LeBlanc (former president and CEO of the NHL's Arizona Coyotes), Bruce Bowser (president of AMJ Campbell Van Lines) and Gary Drummond (former president of hockey operations for the Coyotes). In June 2018 the group met with the Halifax Regional Council in private about plans to bring a CFL team to Halifax, with the possibility of playing at Université de Moncton while a stadium in Halifax was being built. Maritime Football Ltd. ownership group selected a site in Shannon Park, Dartmouth, Nova Scotia to develop a new stadium. The stadium was estimated to cost between $170 and $190 million. It would seat 24,000 and have a business model similar to the Ottawa Redblacks, who entered the league in 2014. On October 30, 2018, Halifax City Council unanimously voted in favour of proceeding with a business case analysis of a stadium in the Halifax municipality. Following this positive momentum, Maritime Football Ltd. and CFL commissioner Randy Ambrosie announced that the group would proceed with a season ticket drive to further gauge interest, and also running a team name contest in the hopes of making an announcement on the team name just prior to the 106th Grey Cup game. The target year for the proposed team to enter the league was 2021, with the team name including "Atlantic" in its name, but no franchise was actually awarded in this announcement. Further to the previous discussions with Moncton and New Brunswick politicians, it was also suggested that the potential new franchise could begin play in Moncton while the stadium in Halifax was built. On November 23, 2018, two days before the 106th Grey Cup, Maritime Football Ltd., since renamed Schooners Sports and Entertainment, and commissioner Ambrosie announced the new team would be called the Atlantic Schooners. On March 15, 2023, TSN reporter Dave Naylor revealed that Schooner Sports and Entertainment (SSE) "is no longer involved in pursuing a team for Atlantic Canada".

==== Ridgehaven Holdings ====
On May 22, 2026, Ridgehaven Holdings LLC, an American company led by Las Vegas lawyer and football agent, Mason Williams, proposed a $1.5-billion entertainment complex in Halifax with a 25,000-plus-seat multi-use stadium. The site that was considered was near the Halifax Stanfield International Airport and would have include 8,000 homes and commercial properties. The league did not comment directly and only advised that they were pleased with the interest. The owner of the desired property near the airport later said that they were moving forward with other buyers, but the Ridgehaven Holdings group met with the Nova Scotia Premier, Tim Houston, to discuss alternatives.

=== Quebec City ===
There has been interest in adding a team in Quebec City. In 2003, an exhibition game was held at Telus Stadium between the Montreal Alouettes and Ottawa Renegades where Montreal won 54–23. In 2008, the federal government rejected a proposal that could have paved the way for a CFL franchise in Quebec City, saying Ottawa is not in the business of subsidizing professional sports. The following year in May 2009, Christina Saint Marche, a British businesswoman, announced her interest in operating a team in Quebec City—stating that there would be a natural rivalry with the Montreal Alouettes. During the 2010 Grey Cup state of the league news conference, Cohon noted that the Alouettes hold the rights for the entire province of Quebec and that any expansion would have to be negotiated with them first. Another exhibition game was held at Telus Stadium on June 13, 2015, with Ottawa (whose TD Place Stadium was in use by the 2015 FIFA Women's World Cup) hosting Montreal.

On June 2, 2026, it was reported that the league had been in discussions with business and political leaders in Quebec City for more than a year regarding an expansion franchise and a new stadium that would be built on the site of Colisée de Québec, which was scheduled for demolition in 2027. Prospective investors had met with league officials and suggested playing at Université Laval's Telus Stadium until a new stadium is built. However, the league declined to comment, only stating that they were pleased with interest in expansion.

On September 23, 2026, the CFL's board of governors voted to add a team in Quebec City if further conditions are met. Real estate developer William Trudel is the main financial backer of the expansion bid. The league stated they had "very productive discussions with a serious and committed group".

=== Saskatoon ===
Saskatoon last hosted top-level Canadian football in 1935 when the Regina Roughriders left the Saskatchewan Rugby Football Union to form the WIFU. The Saskatoon Hilltops (along with another Saskatchewan-based team, the Moose Jaw Millers) eventually suspended operations due to World War II; the Hilltops remained an amateur team when they returned in 1947 (they have since played in the Canadian Junior Football League). Saskatoon last won a provincial title in 1921. By the time they resumed play after the war, the Roughriders had been the dominant team in the province for two decades.

In early 2012, management at Credit Union Centre publicly expressed its desire to bring a CFL team to Saskatoon. However, the Regina-based Saskatchewan Roughriders have long branded themselves as a province-wide team, and claimed that the population of Saskatchewan is too small to support two teams. In any event, Saskatoon also lacks a suitable outdoor stadium. Its largest, Griffiths Stadium, home of the University of Saskatchewan's Huskies, seats only 6,171 spectators. The Gordie Howe Bowl, which has hosted CFL exhibitions in the past, has even fewer seats (it seats 3,950 people).

=== Mexico ===
While not openly being considered for franchise expansion, Mexico was suggested by Commissioner Randy Ambrosie as a possible location for neutral site regular season games (similar to the NFL's Mexico Series) as early as 2019, as well as potentially partnering with the LFA for player development, as part of the league's plan to expand globally. Ambrosie also later announced a special edition of the CFL Combine to be held in 2019 in Mexico for Mexican players, and in 2019, the league held a draft of LFA and Mexican university players. In March 2019, Commissioner Randy Ambrosie told the media that after the LFA combine, multiple parties inquired about purchasing a franchise for Mexico. Ambrosie reiterated that the league had no intention to expand internationally at this time.

== See also ==
- Canadian Football Act
- Canadian Football League attendance
- List of Canadian Football League mascots
- List of Canadian Football League records
- List of Canadian Football League seasons
- List of Canadian Football League stadiums
- List of Grey Cup champions
- Major professional sports leagues in the United States and Canada
- Major professional sports teams in the United States and Canada
- Sports in Canada
- TSN Top 50 CFL Players
