= Randy Ambrosie =

14th commissioner of the Canadian Football League (CFL)

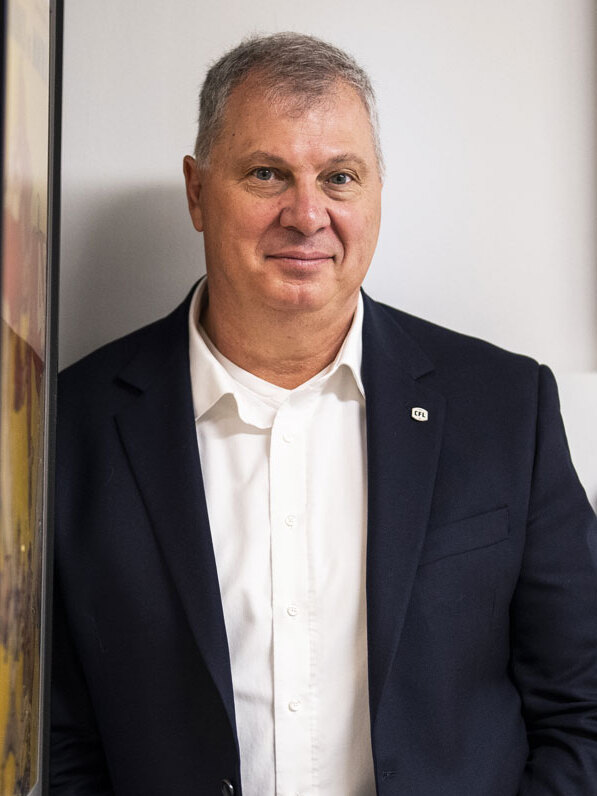
- Ambrosie in 2023

Profile
- Position: Offensive guard

Personal information
- Born: March 16, 1963 (age 63); Winnipeg, Manitoba, Canada
- Listed height: 6 ft 4 in (1.93 m)
- Listed weight: 250 lb (113 kg)

Career information
- University: Manitoba
- CFL draft: 1985: 1st round, 2nd overall pick

Career history
- Calgary Stampeders (1985–1987); Toronto Argonauts (1987–1988); Edmonton Eskimos (1989–1993)

Awards and highlights
- Grey Cup champion (1993); All-Canadian (1984); 2× Canada West All-Star (1983, 1984)

Randy Ambrosie (born March 16, 1963) is a Canadian former professional football player and executive who served as the 14th commissioner of the Canadian Football League (CFL) from 2017 to 2025. Ambrosie played professionally as an offensive guard for the CFL's Calgary Stampeders, Toronto Argonauts, and Edmonton Eskimos from 1985 to 1993. He was selected with the second overall pick in the 1985 CFL draft by the Stampeders. Over the course of a nine-season career, he played in 142 professional games and became a Grey Cup champion. Ambrosie played CIAU football at the University of Manitoba.

== Early career ==
Ambrosie played CIAU football for the Manitoba Bisons as an offensive lineman. In 1984, he was named an All-Canadian. He was also a Canada West All-Star in 1983 and 1984. In a February 1985 article in The Globe and Mail, it was stated that a recent poll of CFL teams listed Ambrosie as one of the top nine players available for the 1985 CFL draft. Ambrosie received a Bachelor of Commerce degree from the school.

== Professional career ==
=== Calgary Stampeders ===
Ambrosie was selected in the first round of the 1985 CFL draft by the Calgary Stampeders with the second overall pick. The Stampeders used Ambrosie in their lineup immediately. Despite a late season injury due to torn ligaments in his ankle, Ambrosie played in 13 regular season games in his rookie season and was named the Stampeders' nominee for rookie of the year. Ambrosie remained in the lineup in 1986, playing in 17 regular season games.

=== Toronto Argonauts ===
After playing four games for the Stampeders in 1987, Ambrosie was traded to the Toronto Argonauts for a second-round draft pick. He quickly earned a place on the Argonauts' roster, playing against the Stampeders in his first week after changing between the two teams. The Argonauts eventually promoted Ambrosie to start as a right guard. Ambrosie finished the season with 13 games played for the Argonauts. He played in the 75th Grey Cup, making a key block to allow running back Gill Fenerty to score a touchdown late in the first half. The Argonauts went on to lose the game 38–36.

The offensive line of the Argonauts dealt with injuries for much of the 1988 season. Ambrosie injured his knee during training camp, while other Argonaut offensive linemen suffered from a variety of ankle, groin, knee, and back injuries. By late July, Ambrosie had recovered, but he was the only healthy starting member of the offensive line that year. Despite the medical setbacks, both the press and the Argonauts coaching staff praised the offensive line, with the Toronto Star crediting the unit for "establish[ing] Toronto as one of the best running teams in the Canadian Football League". In September, Ambrosie missed three games due to a back injury and he played through an ankle injury in October. The continued injury issues did not affect the offensive line's success on the field, as they finished with the second fewest sacks allowed in the CFL. Ambrosie finished the regular season with 15 games played. The Argonauts went on to lose in the East Final to the Winnipeg Blue Bombers.

=== Edmonton Eskimos ===
In June 1989, Ambrosie was traded to the Edmonton Eskimos to obtain defensive lineman Branko Vincic. The Argonauts had not originally planned to trade Ambrosie, but he requested to be traded to a team closer to where his wife worked. Ambrosie played in all 18 regular season games for the Eskimos in 1989 as the Eskimos established a 16–2 record. By adding to the Argonauts 14 wins the previous season, Ambrosie set a new CFL record as the player with the most wins in two consecutive seasons. Despite being described as "one of the strongest teams in CFL history", the Eskimos lost to the Saskatchewan Roughriders 32–21 in the West Final to end their season. Ambrosie played in 13 games for the Eskimos in 1990, missing time due to a knee injury. He played in all 18 regular season games the following year. In 1991, the Eskimos finished first in the West Division but lost the West Final to the Stampeders.

In 1992, Ambrosie played in all regular season games as the Eskimos went 13–5 before losing in the West Finals to the Stampeders for the second consecutive season. The Eskimos considered there to be "no safe jobs" on the roster following several years of playoff losses, but Ambrosie earned a starting role on the team to start the 1993 season. A knee injury kept Ambrosie out of the lineup for most of September, and he finished with 13 games played in 1993. The Eskimos met the Stampeders in the West Final for the fourth consecutive season and won 29–15 to break their playoff losing streak. Ambrosie helped the Eskimos win the 81st Grey Cup over the Winnipeg Blue Bombers 33–23 to earn his only championship ring.

=== Retirement ===
Following his Grey Cup win, the future of Ambrosie's football career was uncertain. His persistent knee injuries had required multiple surgeries over the years. Ambrosie put off another serious surgery on his left knee during the 1993 season to remain with the team through their Grey Cup victory. After he underwent his fourth knee surgery during the offseason, Ambrosie retired from professional football.

== Administrative roles ==
By 1992, Ambrosie took over as the secretary of the Canadian Football League Players' Association (CFLPA). He played a role in monitoring the 1992 NHL strike as the CFLPA and the CFL renegotiated their collective bargaining agreement that year. Ambrosie was also part of the CFLPA board that oversaw the CFL's expansion into the United States. During the expansion, Ambrosie took a strong stance against lowering the import ratio which requires each team to carry a certain number of Canadian players. He also took issue with a proposed expansion or dispersal draft intended to be held in early 1993 to provide players for the San Antonio Texans and Sacramento Gold Miners. The CFLPA and Ambrosie threatened legal action over the import ratio issue, but no legal action came to pass.

On June 28, 2017, the Winnipeg Free Press reported that Ambrosie would soon be named the 14th CFL commissioner, succeeding Jeffrey Orridge. The move was officially announced seven days later. He is the first Canadian-born CFL commissioner since Tom Wright left in 2006, and the first to have played in the league since Larry Smith left the position in 1997. On October 26, 2024, Ambrosie announced his intention to retire from the commissioner's role in 2025, once a successor is found. Ambrosie's replacement, Stewart Johnston, was announced in April 2025.

== Business career ==
After retiring from football, Ambrosie became the North American head of sales at HSBC Securities. In May 2004, Ambrosie joined AGF Management Ltd. as their head of sales and marketing. The president of the company reportedly hired him to "shake things up". Ambrosie's leadership brought several changes to AGF Management Ltd., including new fund managers and the launch of new products. In June 2006, Ambrosie was appointed president of AGF Funds Inc. Due to another managerial change in 2008, Ambrosie left the firm.

Ambrosie served as CEO of Accretive 360 Inc. from 2010 to 2012, before joining investment firm MacDougall, MacDougall & MacTier as president and CEO.
